= Villa of the Quintilii =

Ancient Roman ruin

- Villa dei Quintili
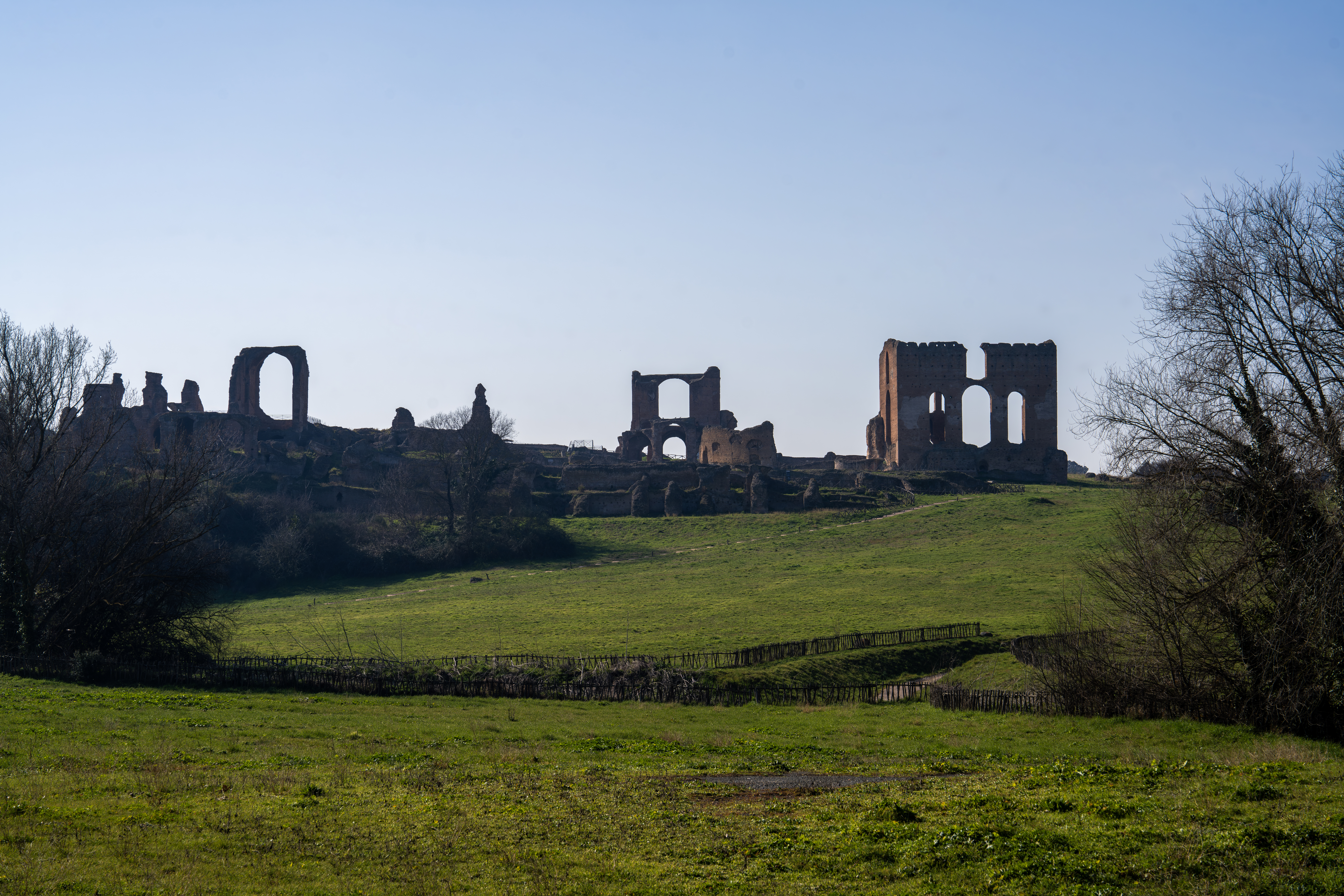
- Ruins of the Villa dei Quintili
- Interactive map of Villa of the Quintilii
- 41°49′53″N 12°33′09″E
- Type: Dwelling
- Periods: Roman Imperial
- Cultures: Roman
- Location: Rome, Italy
- Region: Lazio

Site notes
- Condition: Ruined
- Owner: Public
- Public access: Yes
- Website: Official website

The Villa of the Quintilii (Italian: Villa dei Quintili) is a monumental ancient Roman villa situated beyond the fifth milestone along the Via Appia Antica just outside the traditional boundaries of Rome, Italy. It was first built by the rich and cultured Quintilii brothers Sextus Quintilius Valerius Maximus and Sextus Quintilius Condianus (consuls in 151 AD).

The ruins of this villa suburbana are of such an extent that when they were first excavated, the site was called Roma Vecchia ("Old Rome") by the locals, as they occupied too great a ground, it seemed, to have been anything less than a town. The villa included extensive thermae fed by its own aqueduct and, what was even more unusual, a garden-hippodrome, which dates to the fourth century, when the villa was Imperial property.

== History ==
The nucleus of the villa was built by the Quintilii brothers Sextus Quintilius Valerius Maximus (proconsul of Asia in 168 AD) and Sextus Quintilius Condianus in the time of Hadrian (r.117-138), as shown by brick stamps found during the excavations of the reception rooms in 1984-87.

The emperor Commodus (r.177-192) coveted the villa so much that he put to death its owners in 182 and confiscated it for himself. Commodus and subsequent emperors then extended and embellished the estate.

From the end of the 4th century the site became a sort of quarry for building materials such as bricks, tuff, marble and metal clamps. Near the Great Exedra hundreds of marble fragments together with the chisel used to tear them from the walls were found.

=== Discovery and excavations ===
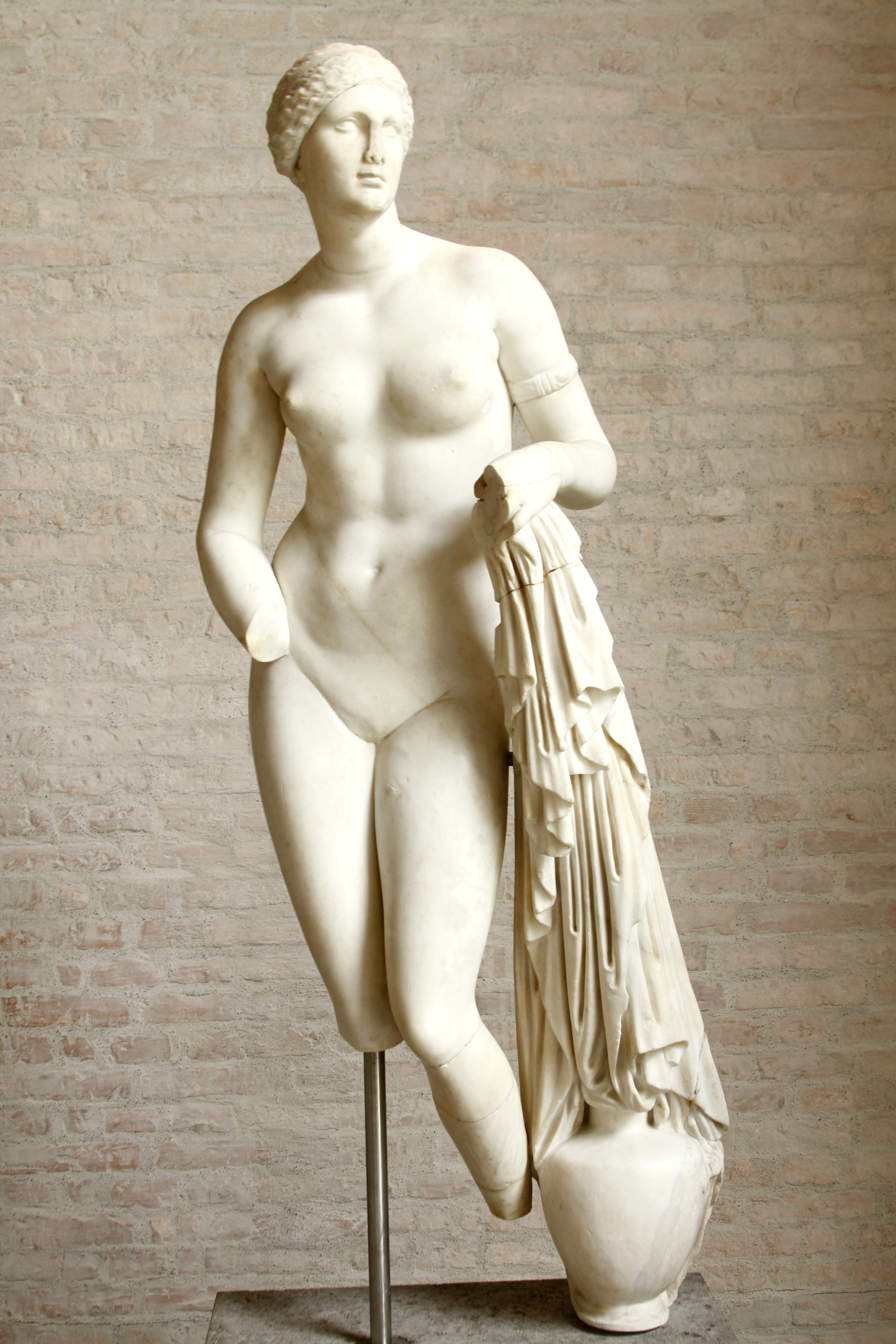
Braschi Aphrodite (Aphrodite of Knidos) from the villa, Glyptothek - Munich

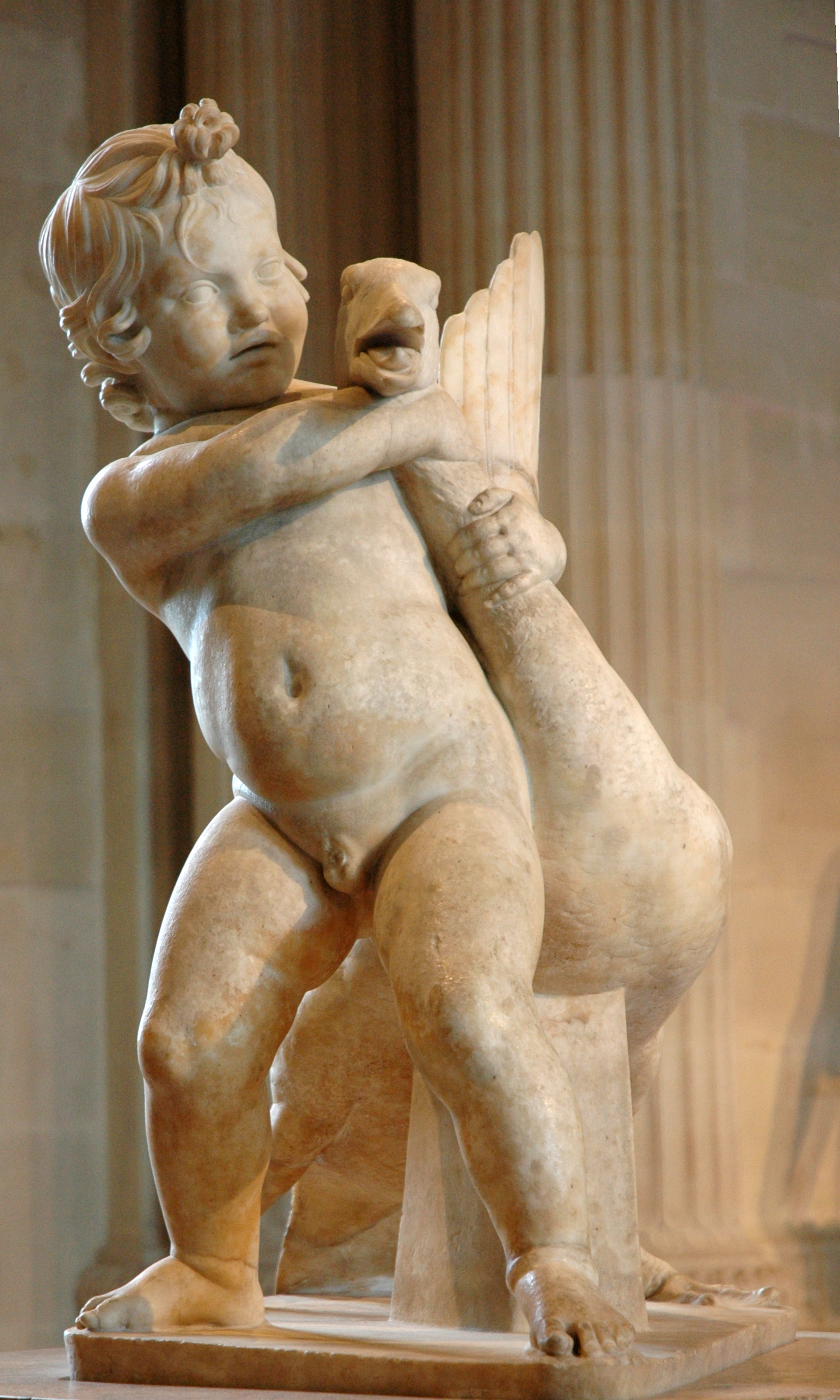
Boy with the Goose from the villa, Louvre

In 1776 Gavin Hamilton, the entrepreneurial painter and purveyor of Roman antiquities, excavated some parts of the Villa of the Quintilii, still called "Roma Vecchia", and the sculptures he uncovered revealed the imperial nature of the site:

A considerable ruin is seen near this last upon the right hand, and is generally considered to have been the ruins of a Villa of Domitian's nurse. The fragments of Collossal Statues found near this ruin confirms me in this opinion, the excellent sculptour strengthens this supposition...

There he found five marble sculptures, including "An Adonis asleep", that he sold to Charles Townley and which has come to the British Museum and "A Bacchante with the tyger", listed as sold to Mr Greville. The large marble relief of Asclepius found at the site passed from Hamilton to the Earl of Shelburne, later Marquess of Lansdowne, at Lansdowne House, London. The "Braschi Venus" from the site was purchased by Pius VI's nephew, Luigi Braschi Onesti.

Today the archaeological site houses a museum with marble friezes and sculptures that once adorned the villa. The nympheum, the hall of the tepidarium and the baths may also be visited. A grand terrace overlooking the Via Appia Nuova, which dates back to 1784, commands a fine view of the Castelli Romani district. The villa's grounds extended even beyond the route of the Via Appia Nuova.

In 2018, new excavations uncovered an extravagant and extraordinary winery and triclinium, built over the starting gates of the Commodus' circus, which features marble-clad instead of opus signinum treading areas, and a distribution system with fountains of wine that flowed from the production spaces down into the cellar. The facility has equipment normally found in ancient Roman wineries, but the level of decoration and theatre indicate that it served a more unusual purpose of conspicuous production and potential vintage ritual for the elite of imperial Roman society. Triclinia (dining rooms) with wide entrances surrounded this winery area on three sides, their walls and floors covered in elaborate opus sectile with exotic marbles in geometrical patterns, indicating that the emperor entertained here around the theatrical spectacle of wine production. It is similar to the ceremonial winery of the imperial Villa Magna in Latium. It is dated to the reign of Gordian III (r. 238-244 AD).

== The site ==
The villa's earliest residential and reception areas of the Quintilii brothers are dated to the first decades of the 2nd century between the Hadrianic era and the reign of Marcus Aurelius. The various sectors of the villa were architecturally arranged on different levels connected by courtyards and gardens enclosed by porticoed corridors. The gardens were furnished with ornamental vegetable species and basins with water jets, of which a square-shaped example remains.

=== Public “reception” sector ===
This sector belongs to the original nucleus of the villa and the magnificence of the marble coverings still in place indicates that these rooms were a sumptuous reception area where the owners received guests.

The large courtyard (36 x 12 m) was similar to the western sector of Nero's Domus Aurea and used as a meeting and discussion place similar to a small forum. It has Cipollino marble paving still intact and had a portico on one of the long sides. The main reception rooms are its north side and the main room was an octagonal tower with panorama over the rest of the residential part and connected to the upper level of the garden/amphitheatre. It was enlarged and renovated under Commodus. It had a domed roof and four open entrances, each with a vaulted passage, and was heated by a hypocaust. It is probable that this room was used as a winter triclinium (banquet hall) or at least as a discussion area, from which it was possible to observe the landscape towards the valley and any visitors in the open courtyard below. This reception area was on the upper level and connected to the service rooms below (only partially excavated) by a porticoed corridor the walls of which were decorated with marble slabs and lintels in greco scritto and rosso antico.

To the west of this area was a large circular summer triclinium which in the age of Commodus led to the theatre and of which there was a privileged view to the stage. The nearby rooms between the baths and the theatre have been arranged around this with radial and tangential walls, giving rise to irregular resulting spaces. Many are small but luxurious rooms for receiving and lodging guests and several have exceptionally well preserved polychrome mosaic floors with various decorative motifs, both black and white and coloured, all of which date to the 2nd century. One of the best rooms still has an opus sectile floor made of Palombino, slate, and giallo antico marble, with remains of wall frescos and a hypocaust heating system showing it was used in winter.

The corridor between the baths and the theatre had a mosaic floor with small polychrome crosses, but was occupied in the late Roman era by a double-chamber furnace used to melt and recycle glass and piles of recycled glass were found in a corner.

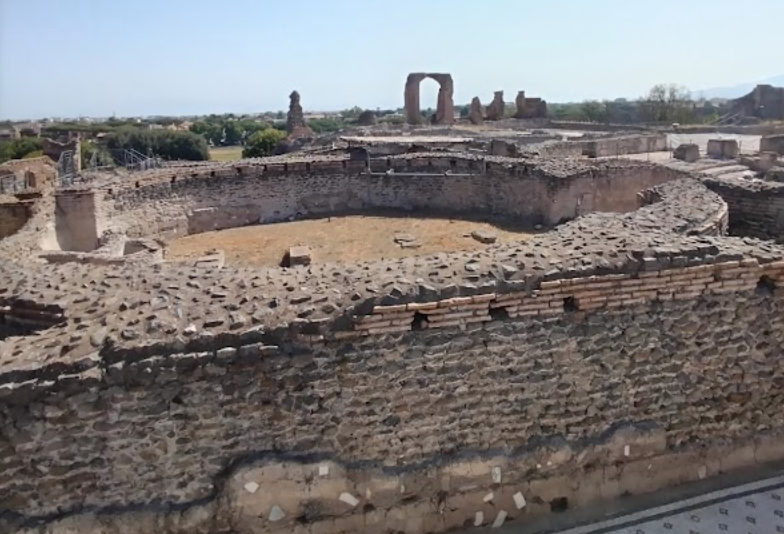
Summer triclinium

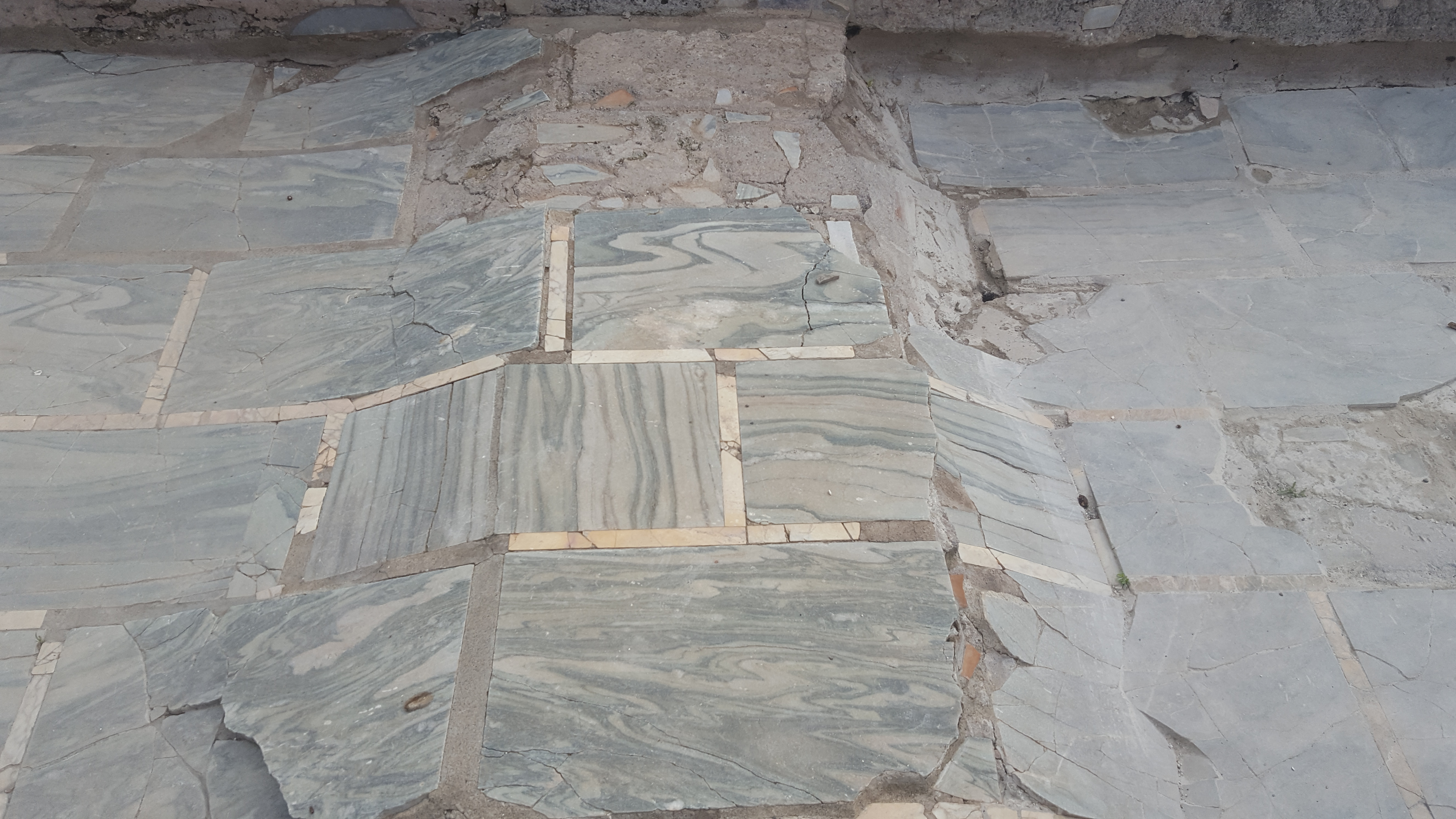
Courtyard floor (Cipollino marble)

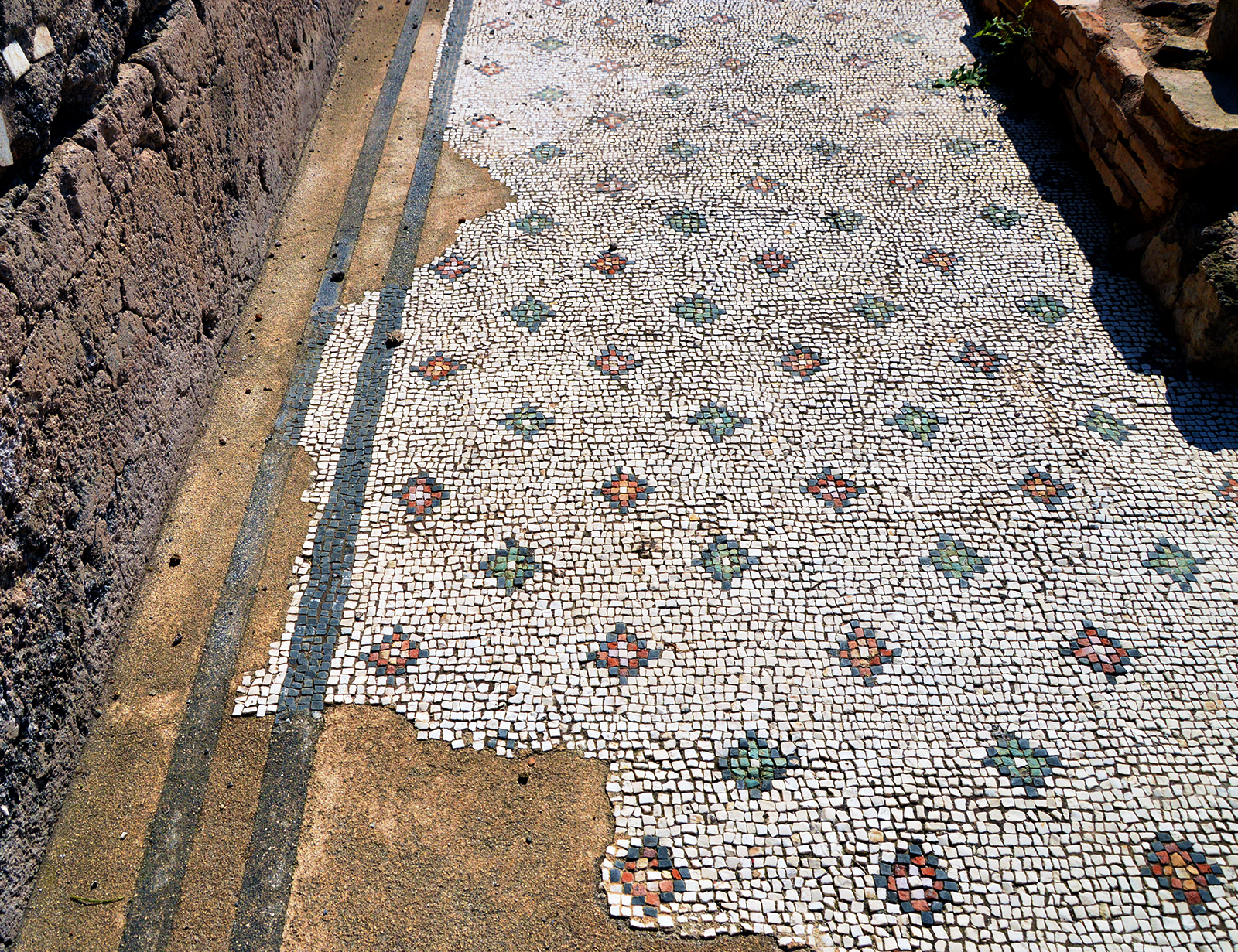
Mosaic floor

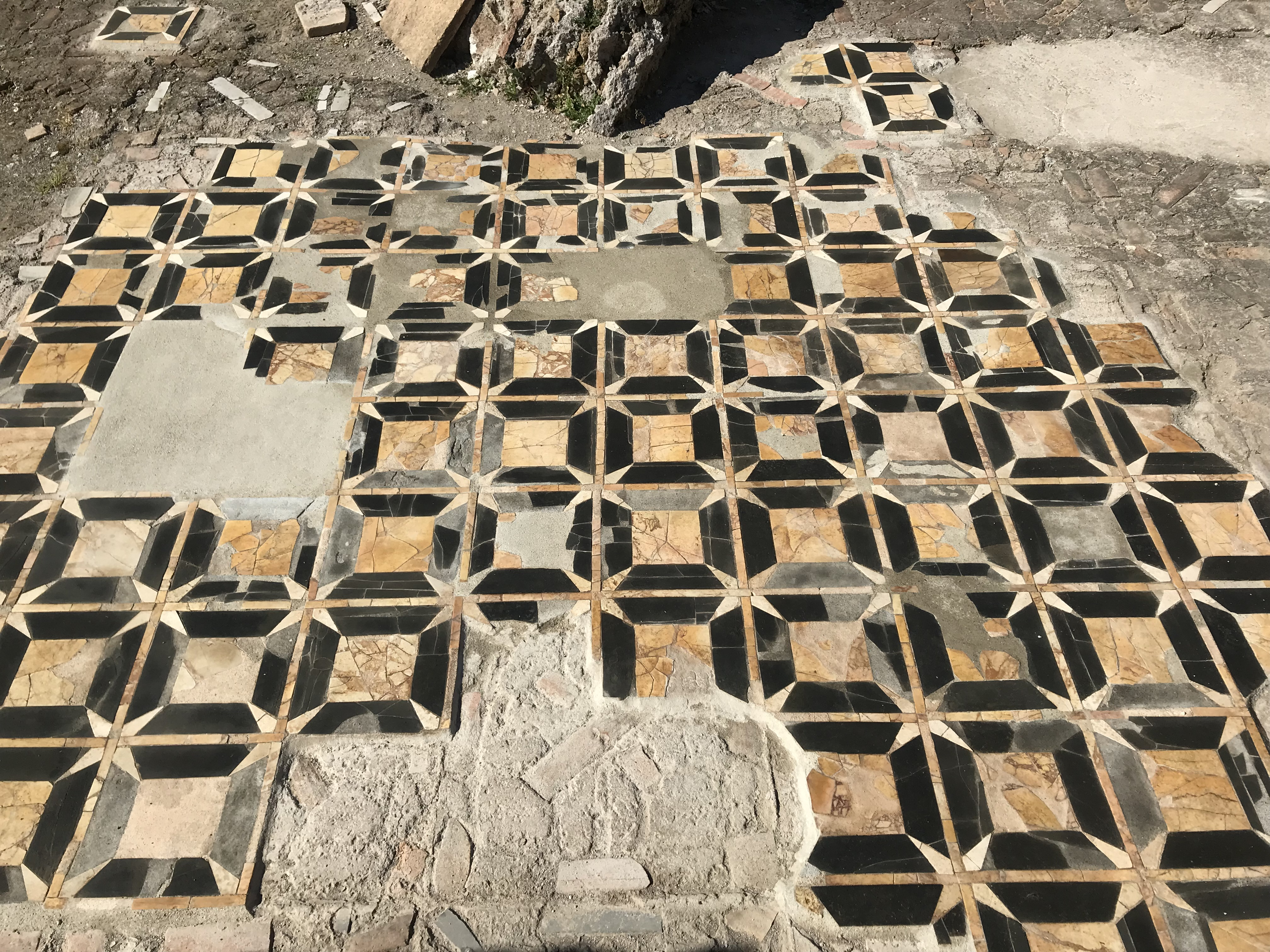
Opus sectile floor

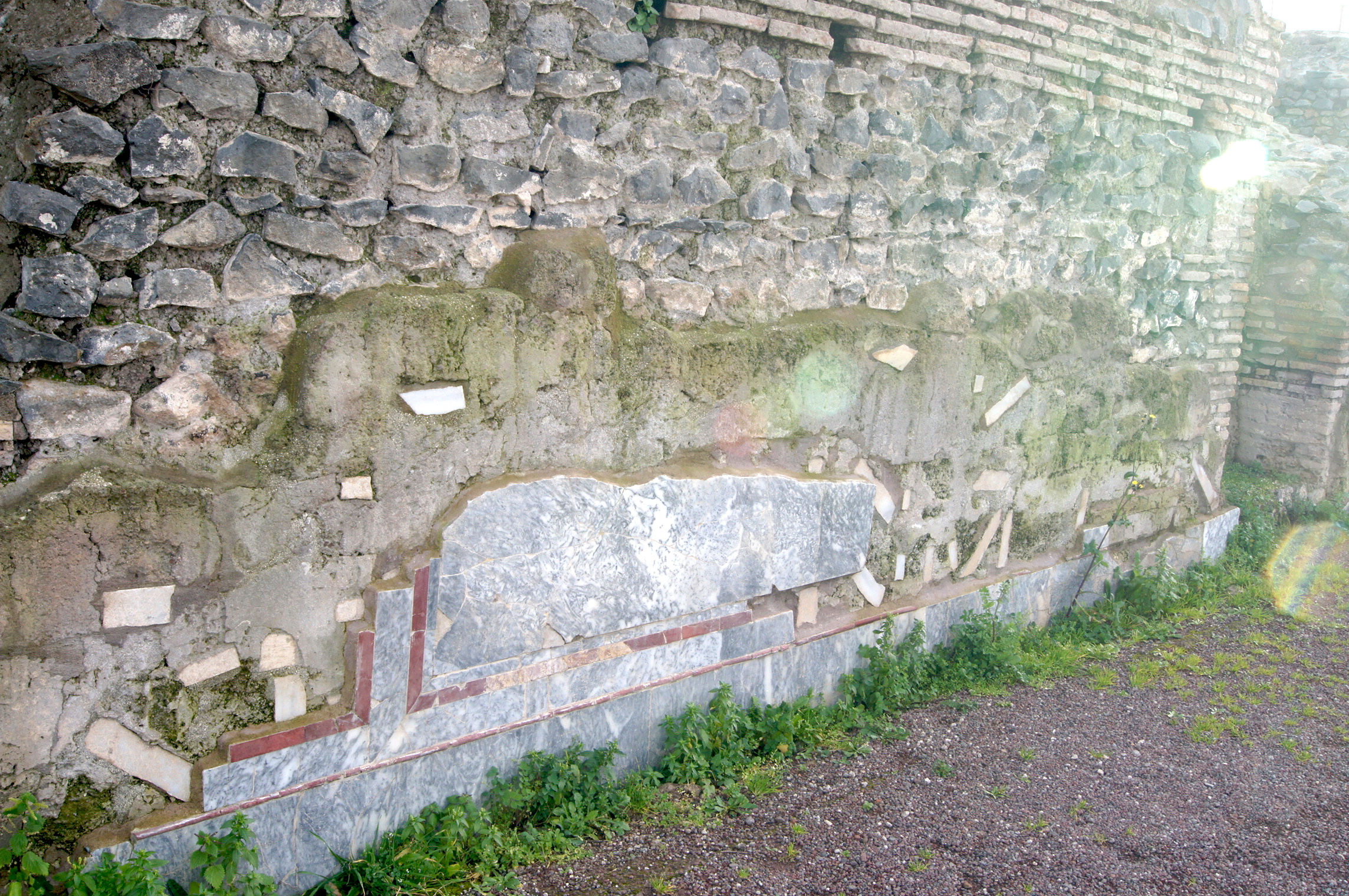
Corridor with marble cladding

=== Private residential part ===
This complex of rooms closely connected in plan and structure with the public sector was partly built on the terrace above the basis villae substructure overlooking the scenic valley below and the ancient Via Latina, and perhaps above a private garden. The residential rooms to the east of the villa had bedrooms (‘’cubicula’’), latrines and small thermal baths for private use. This sector was enlarged and modified from the era of Commodus to the 3rd century, incorporating the original parts from the Quintilii era. The corridor connecting the basis villae with the residential sector had walls and floors covered with precious marble inlays.

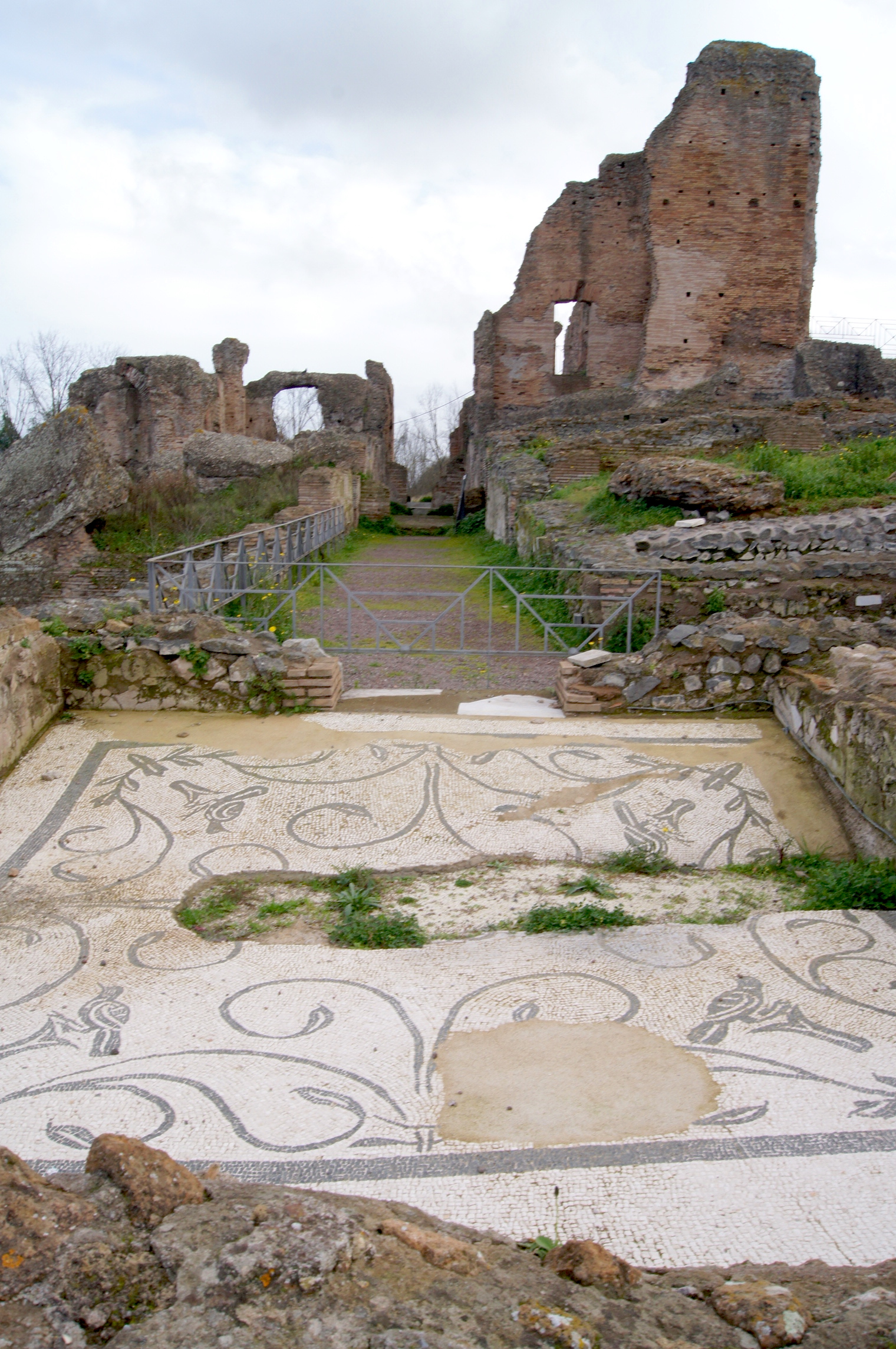
corridor

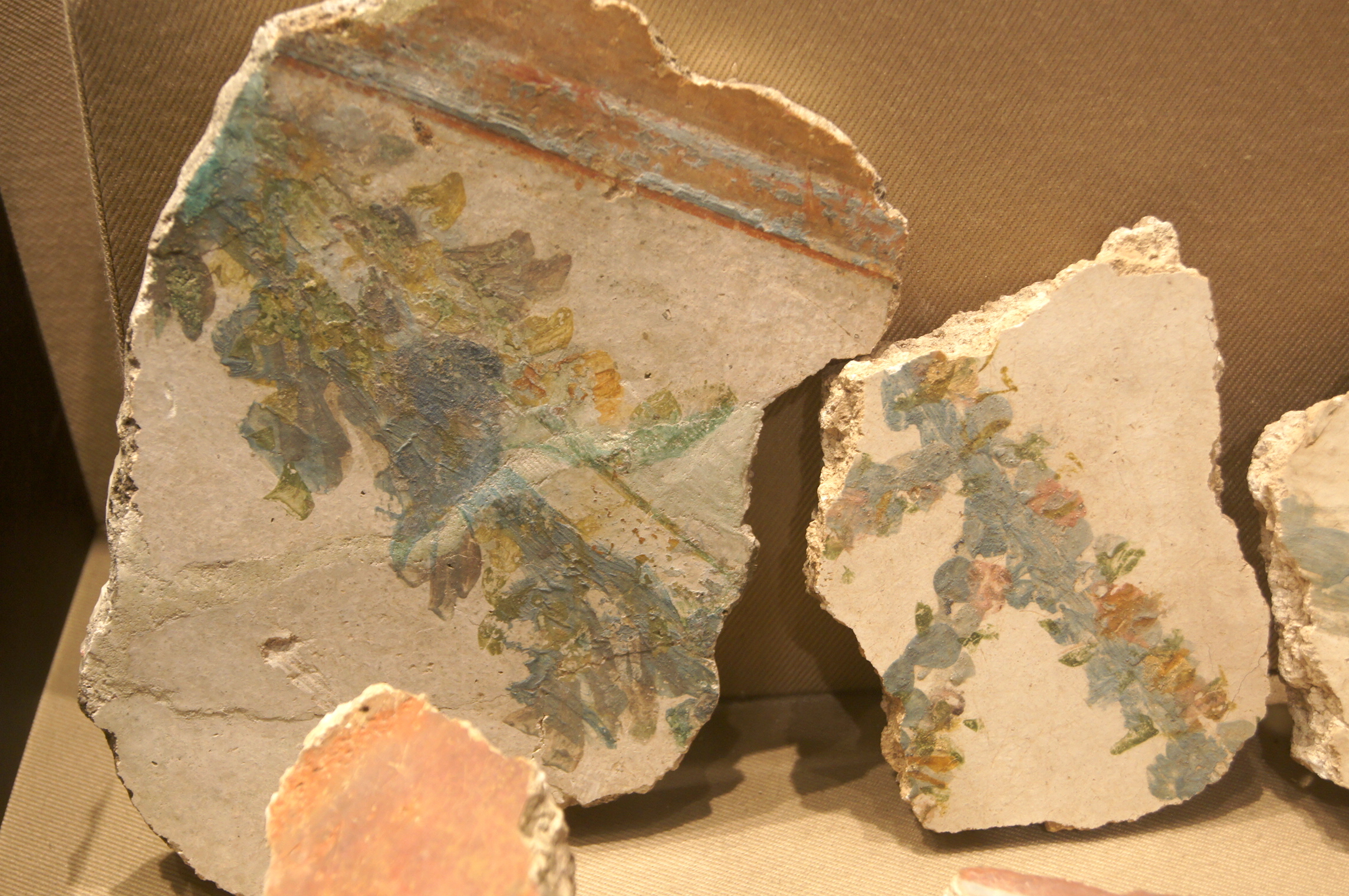
fresco, residential sector

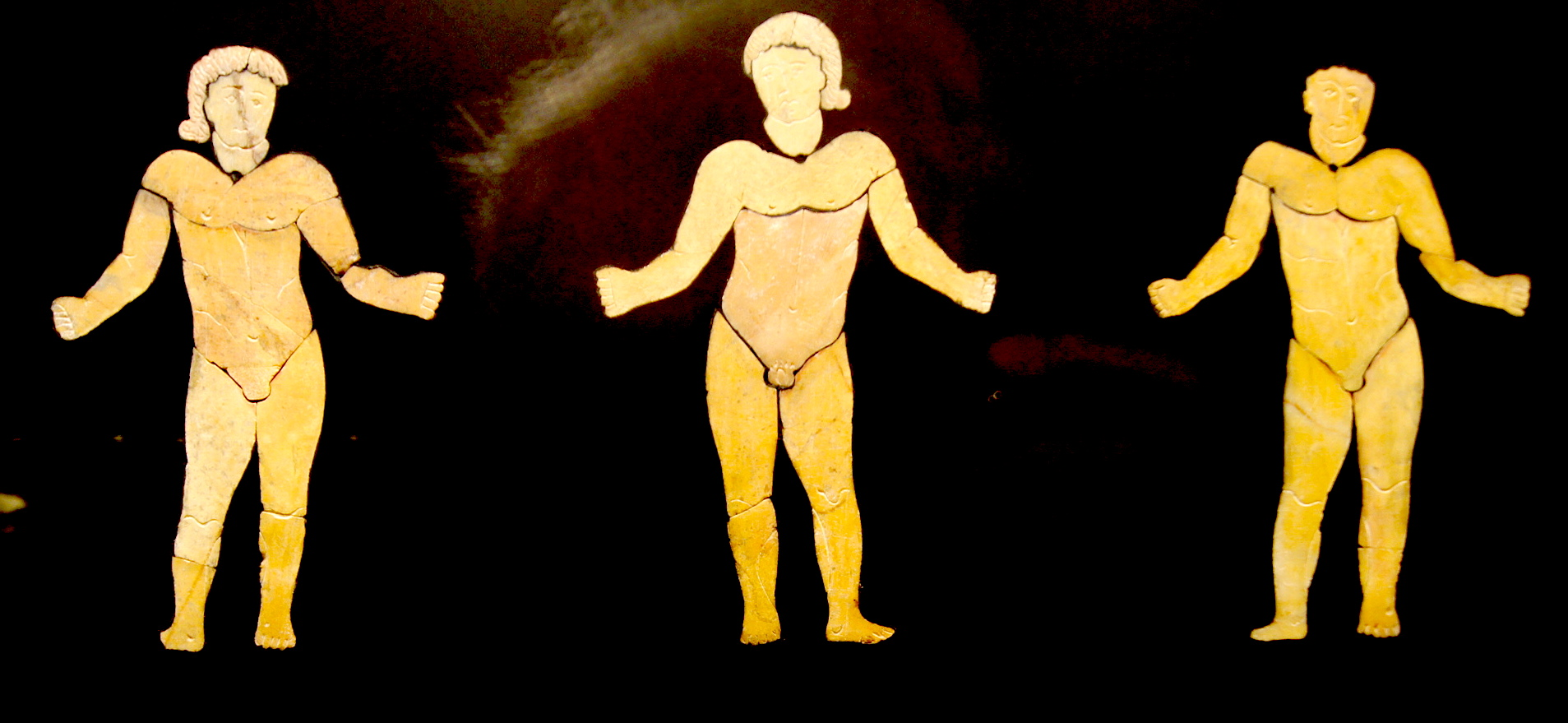
marble, the residential sector

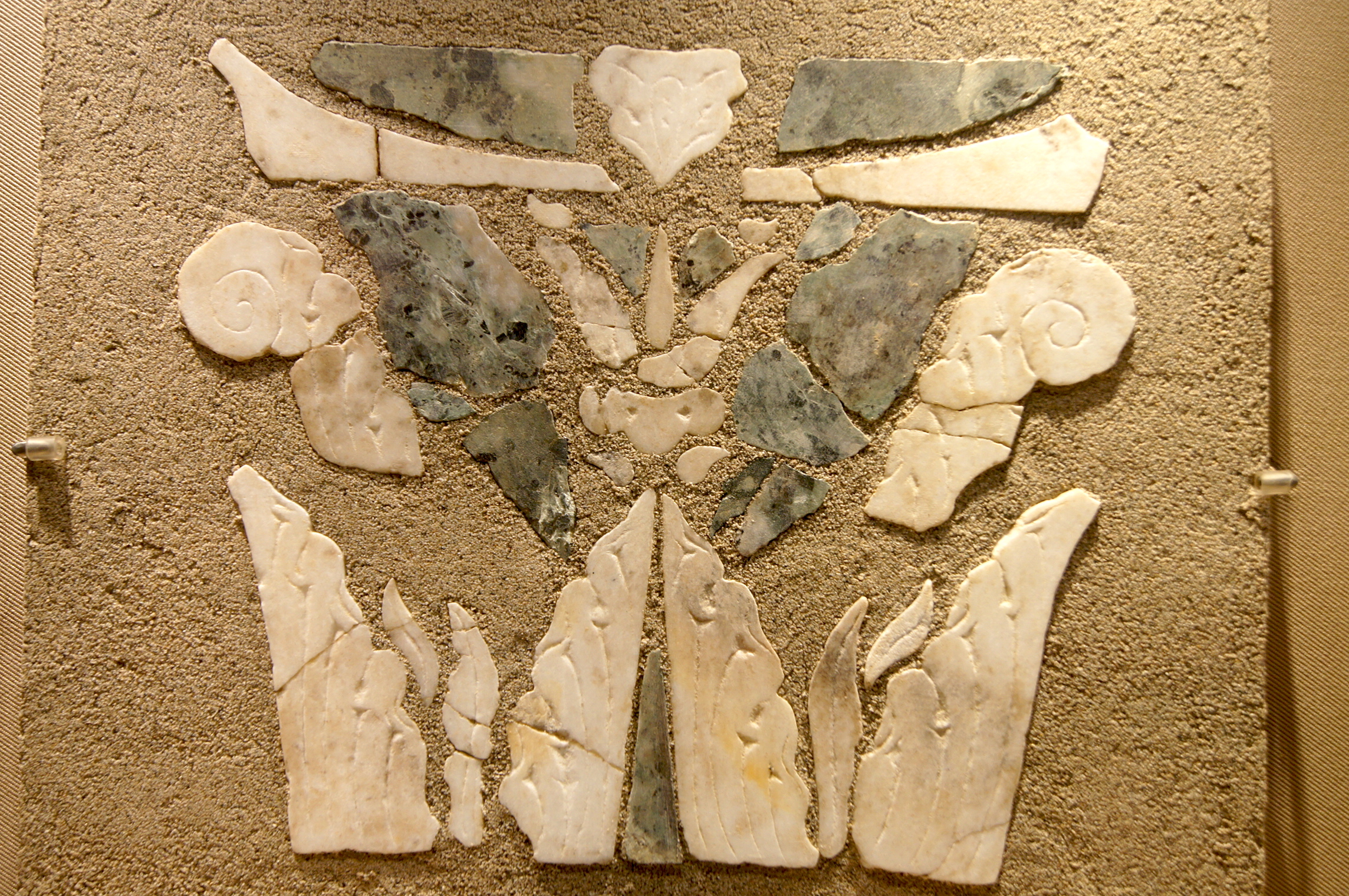
wall marble, residential sector

=== Basis villae ===
This substructural sector of the upper levels of the villa, dating mainly to between the end of the 2nd and beginning of the 3rd century AD, was for services such as the furnaces for heating, kitchens and warehouses, crossed by the sewerage system and the water supply system. This structure was an admirable architectural solution to adapting the building on different levels to the land consisting of a lava bank of the Capo di Bove flow.

The bare wall structures visible today with a curtain wall in opus listata once constituted a series of vaulted rooms, completely plastered, overlooking the valley to the east.

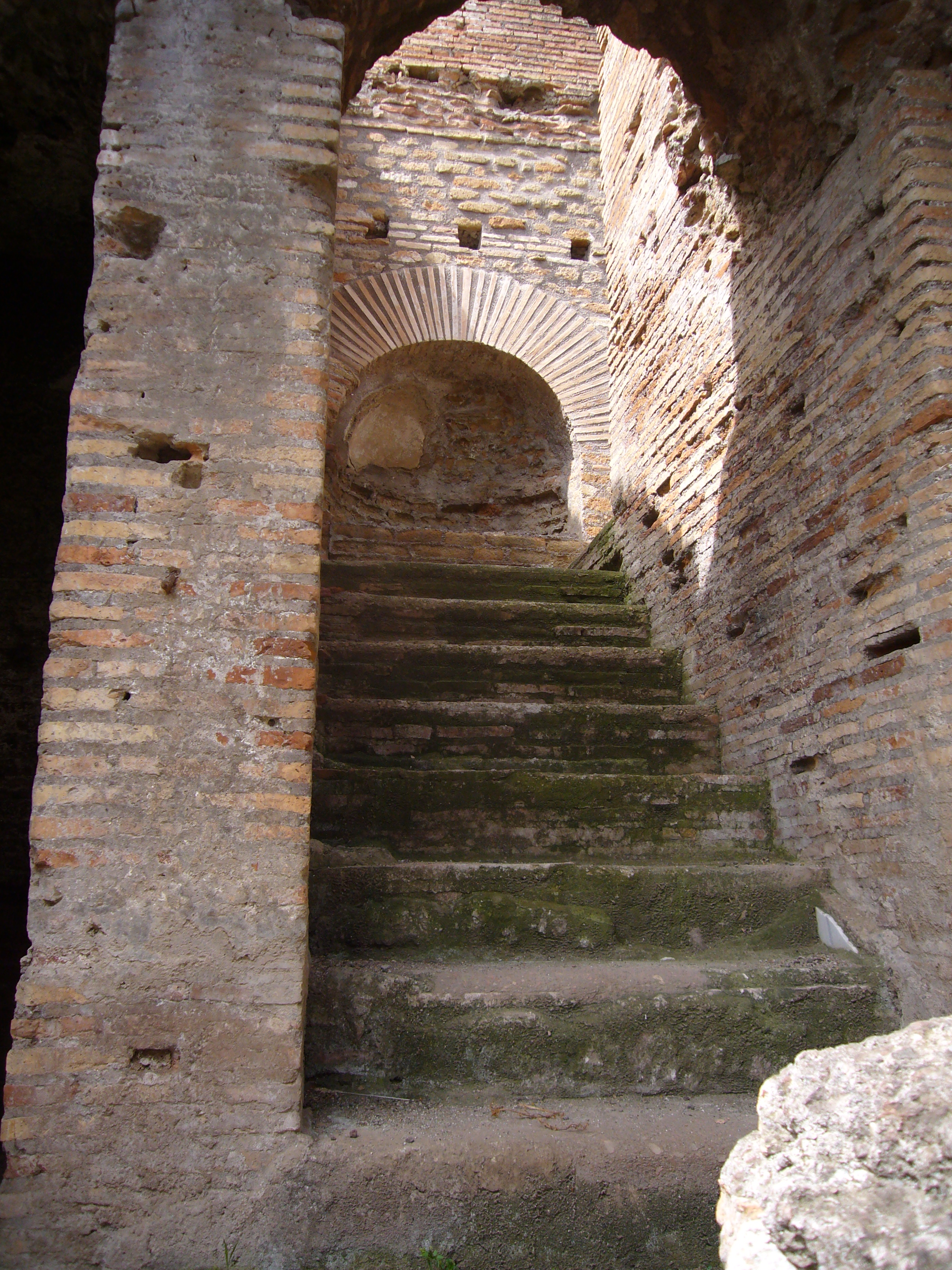

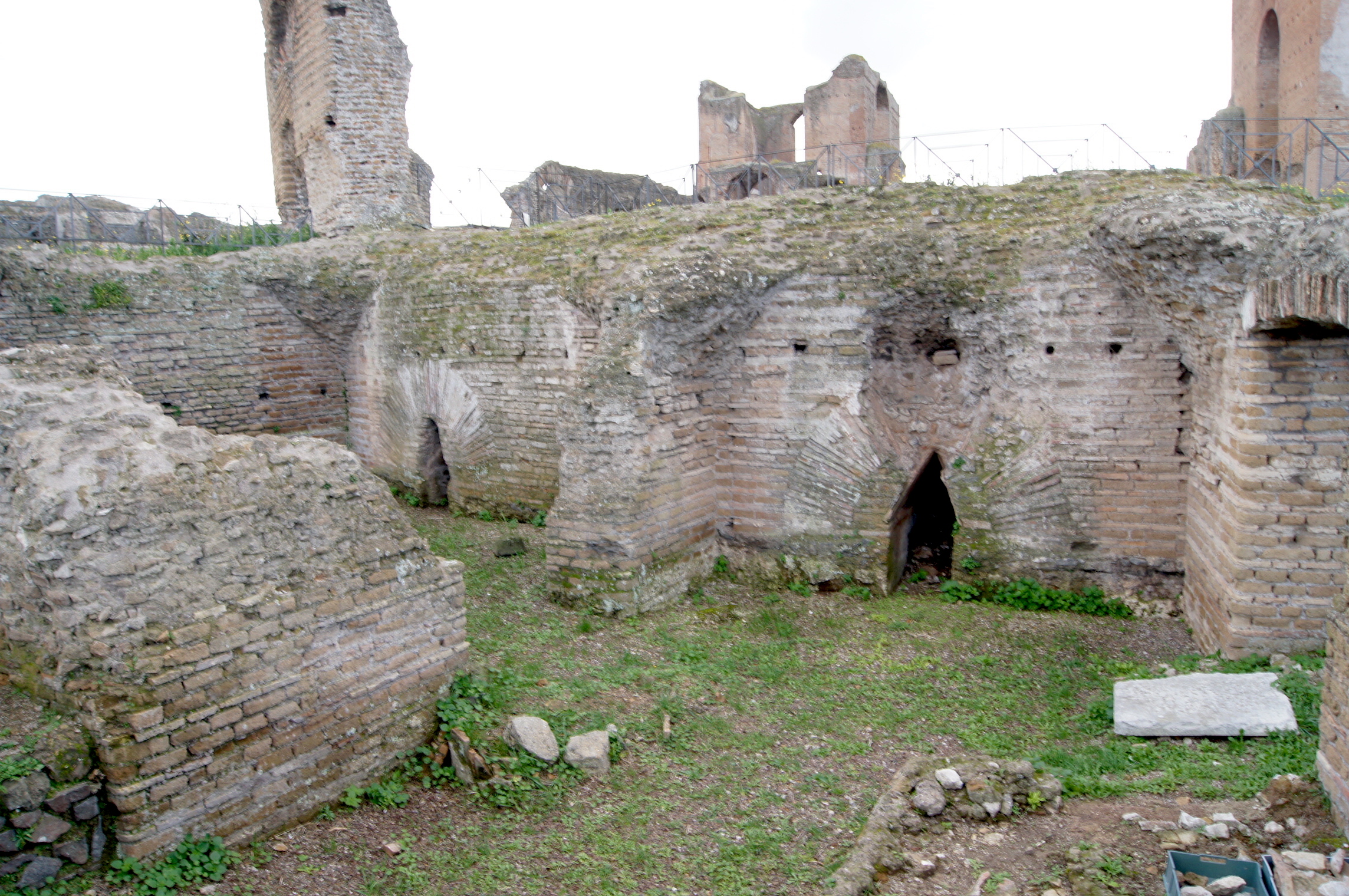

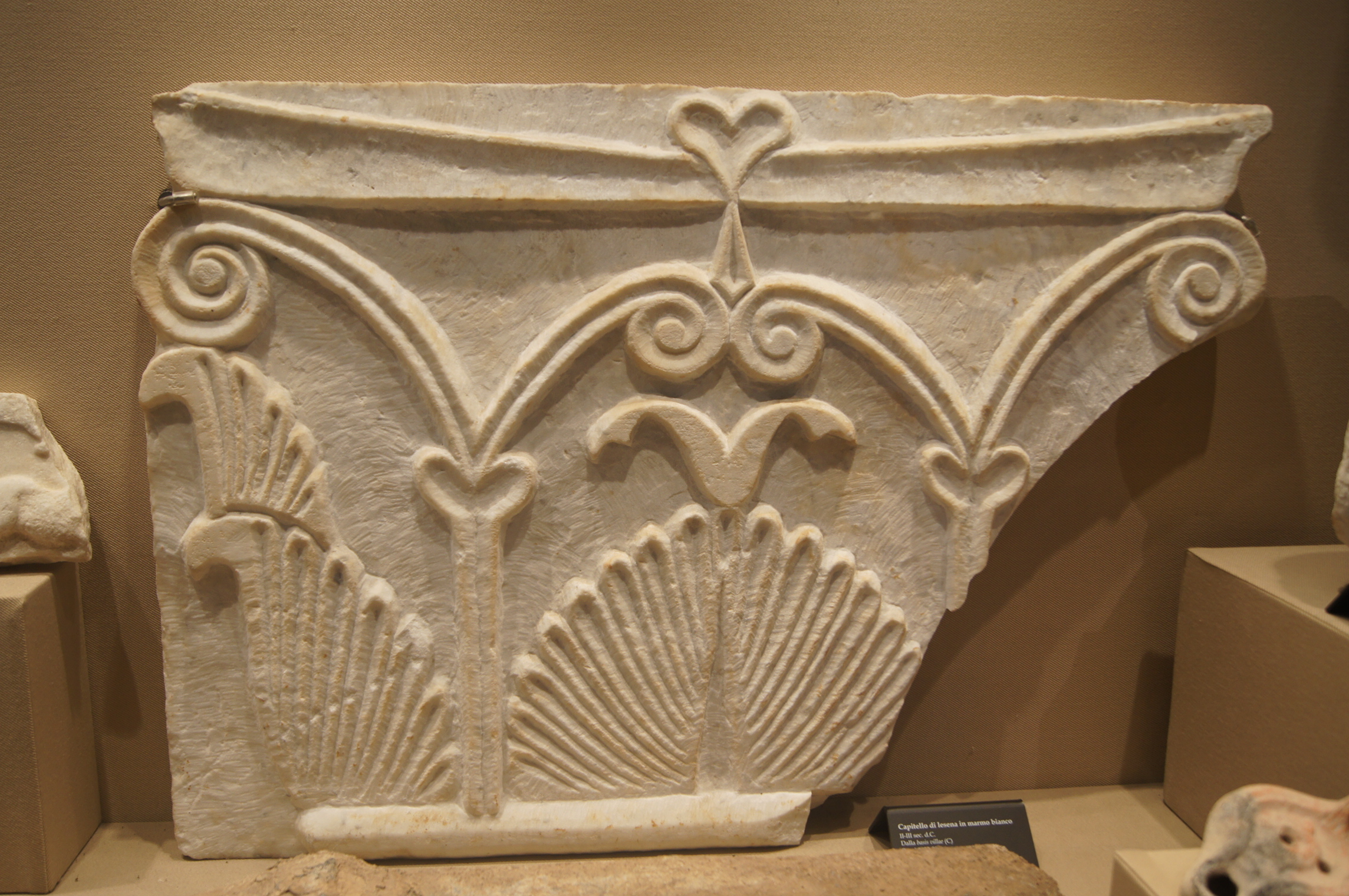

=== The great baths ===
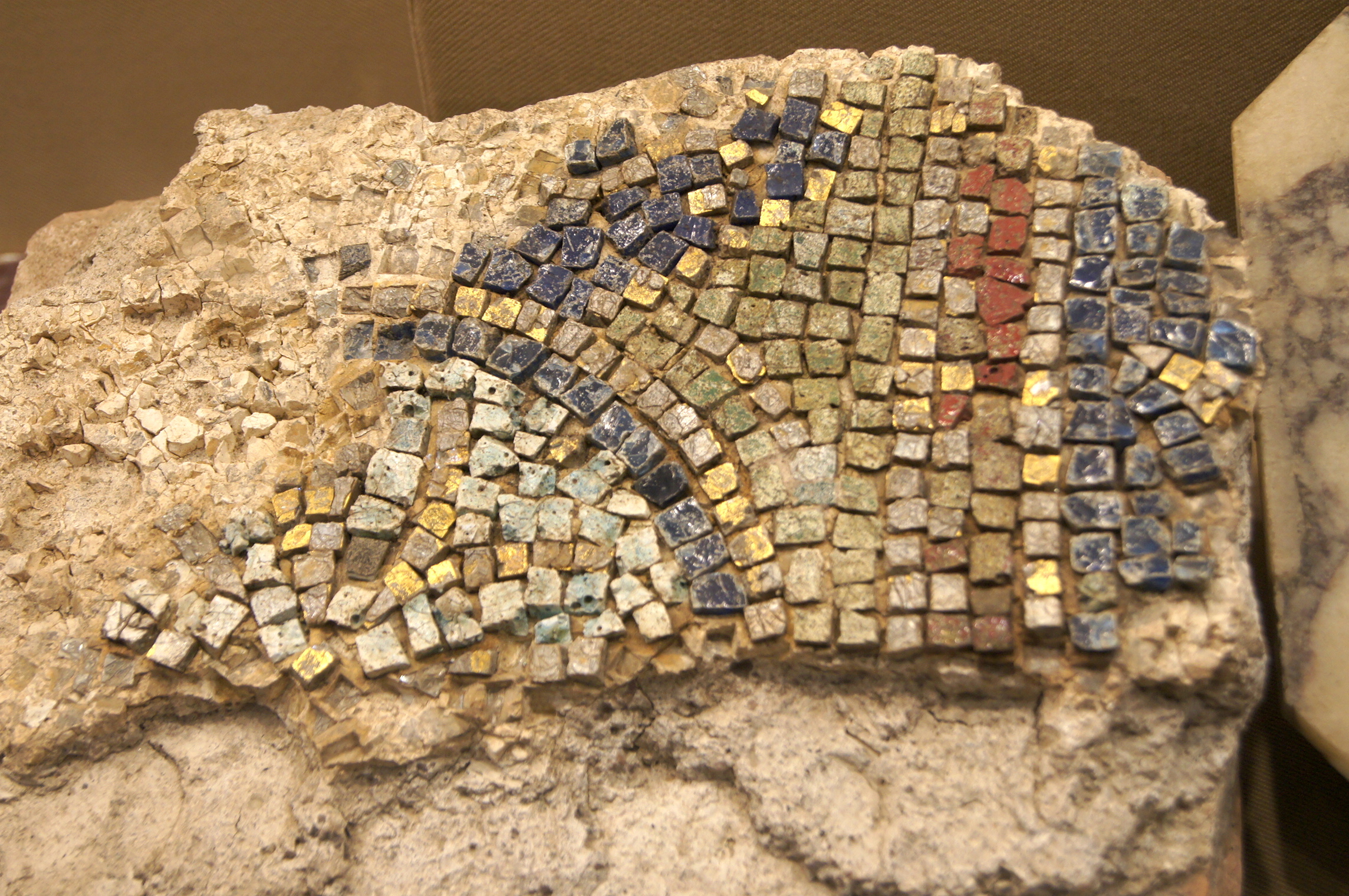
wall mosaic from the tepidarium

Intended for guests, they incorporated the first baths of the Quintili era built from tuff walls, their final enlargement being under Septimius Severus and Caracalla (late 2nd to early 3rd century) using brick for walls.

The large frigidarium hall with two symmetrical cold pools still retains the extraordinary precious marble opus sectile flooring (in Thassos marble, cipollino, giallo antico) found in excavations of 1998-2000, and two preserved marble columns retrieved from the Baths of Diocletian after being removed by Nibby in 1828-9 for Prince Torlonia. The room had been preserved beneath 1.6 m of earth and the collapsed massive vaulted ceiling. The room was decorated with sculptures inspired by the Dionysian theme. To the south of the hall a vestibule is decorated with a polychrome checkerboard mosaic.

The large caldarium has an unusual square structure, enormous windows and a pool 1.2 m deep heated by three large bronze boilers (testudines alvei). The ceiling was vaulted and covered with mosaics of blue, light blue and aquamarine glass paste tiles, found in large numbers. Between the frigidarium and the caldarium lies the tepidarium which includes changing rooms, massage rooms and hot and cold basins, one of which is dated to Gordian III (r.238-244 AD) from a lead pipe stamp.

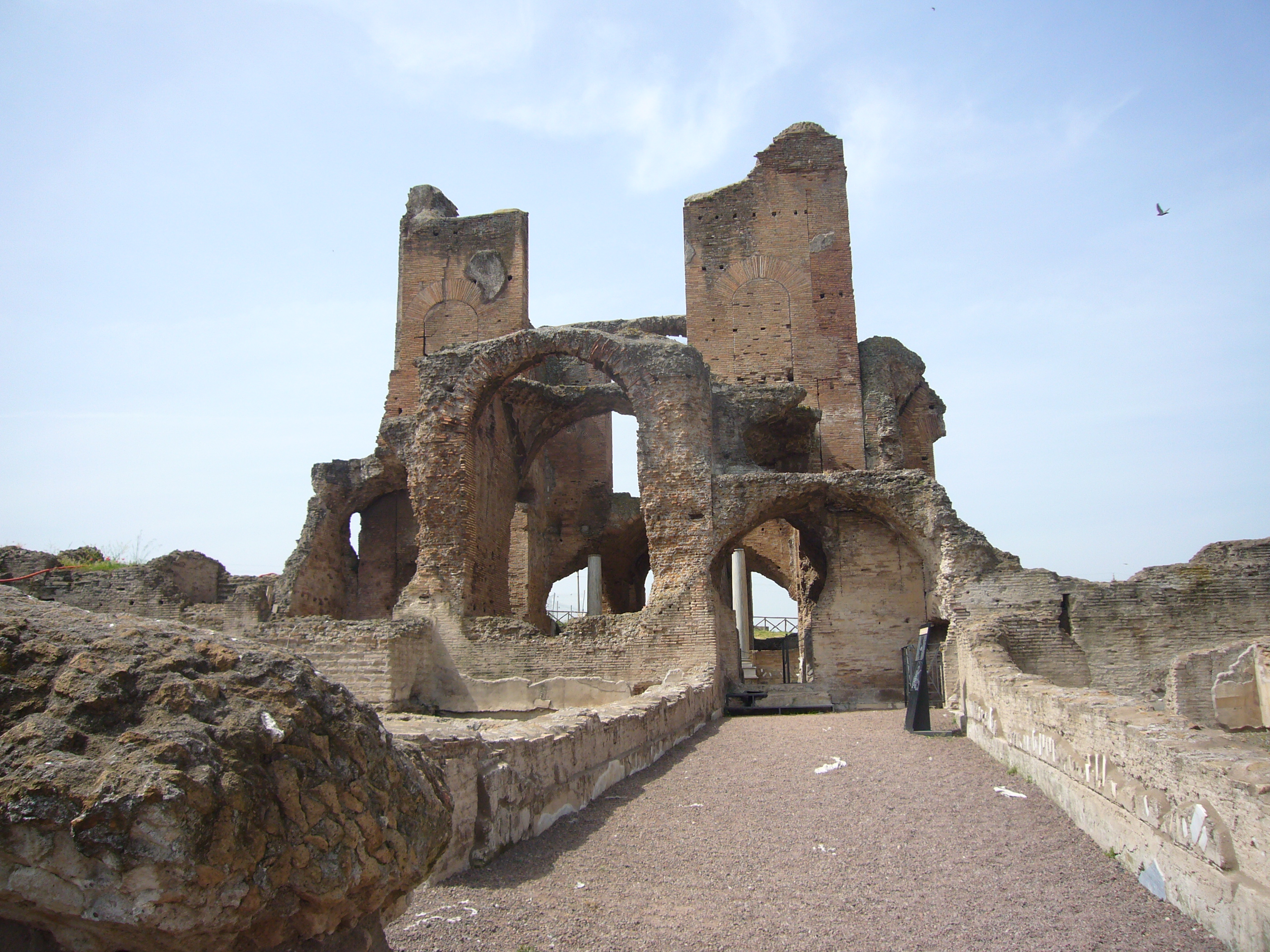
Frigidarium

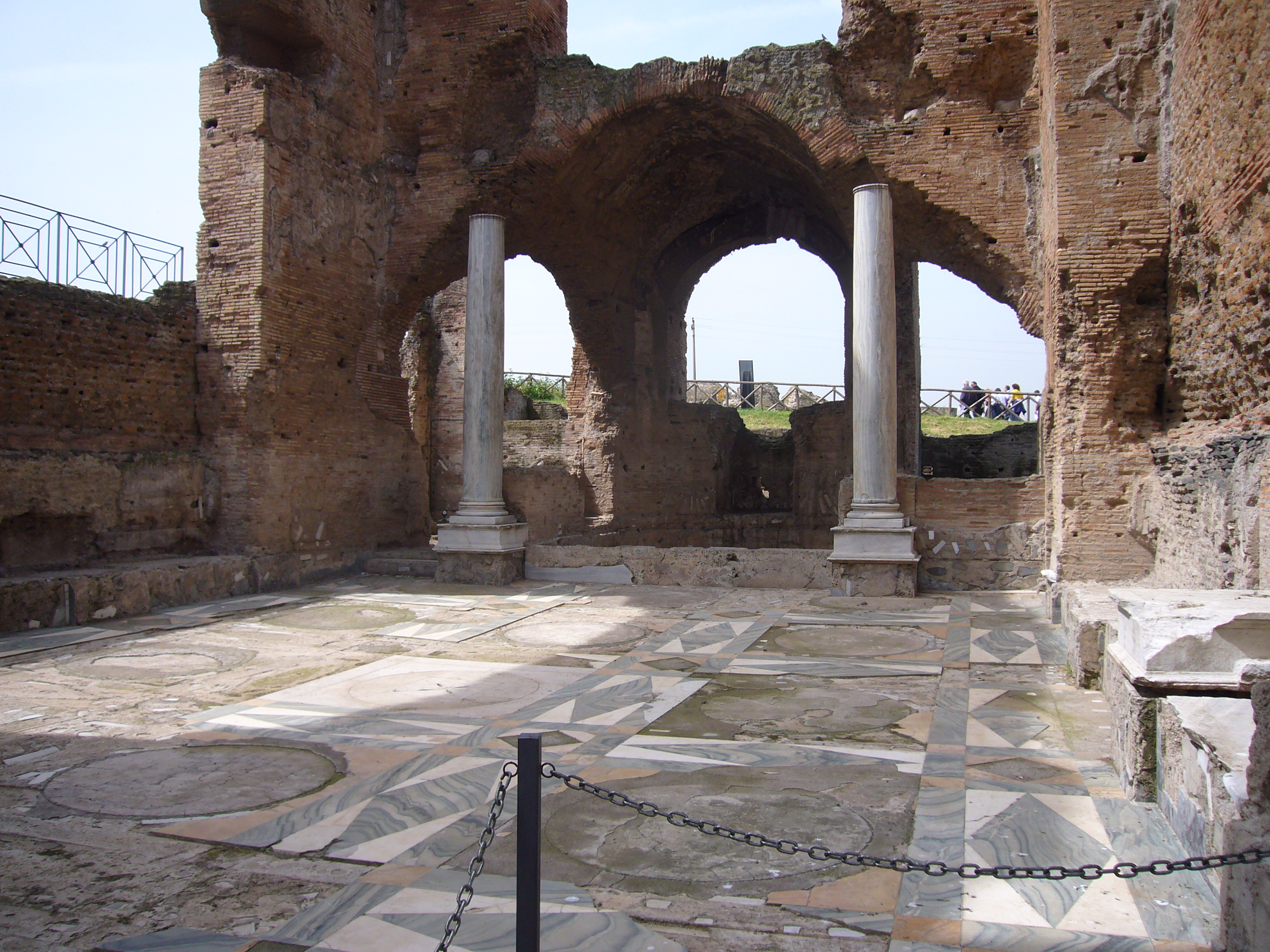
Frigidarium hall

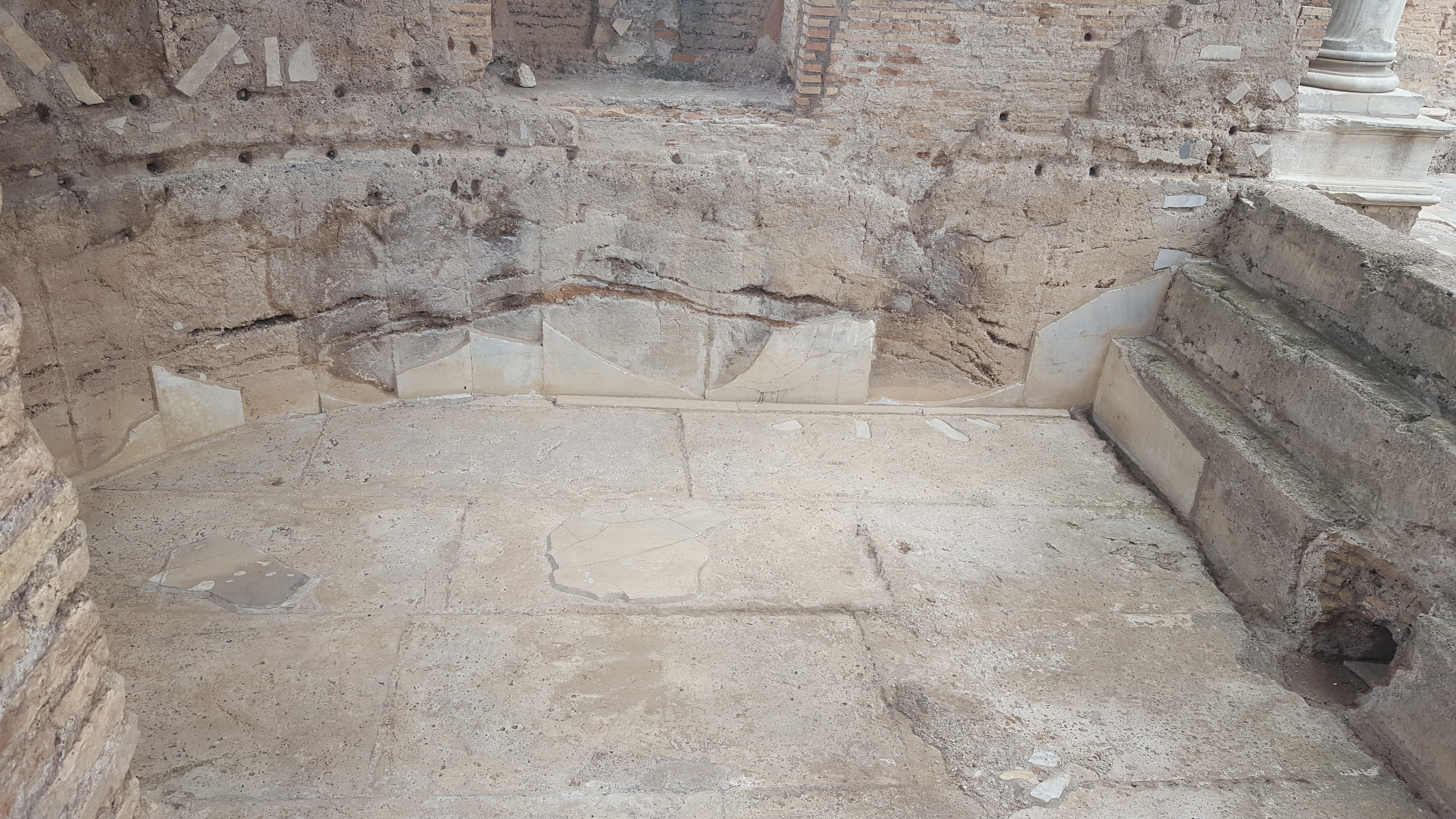
Plunge pool

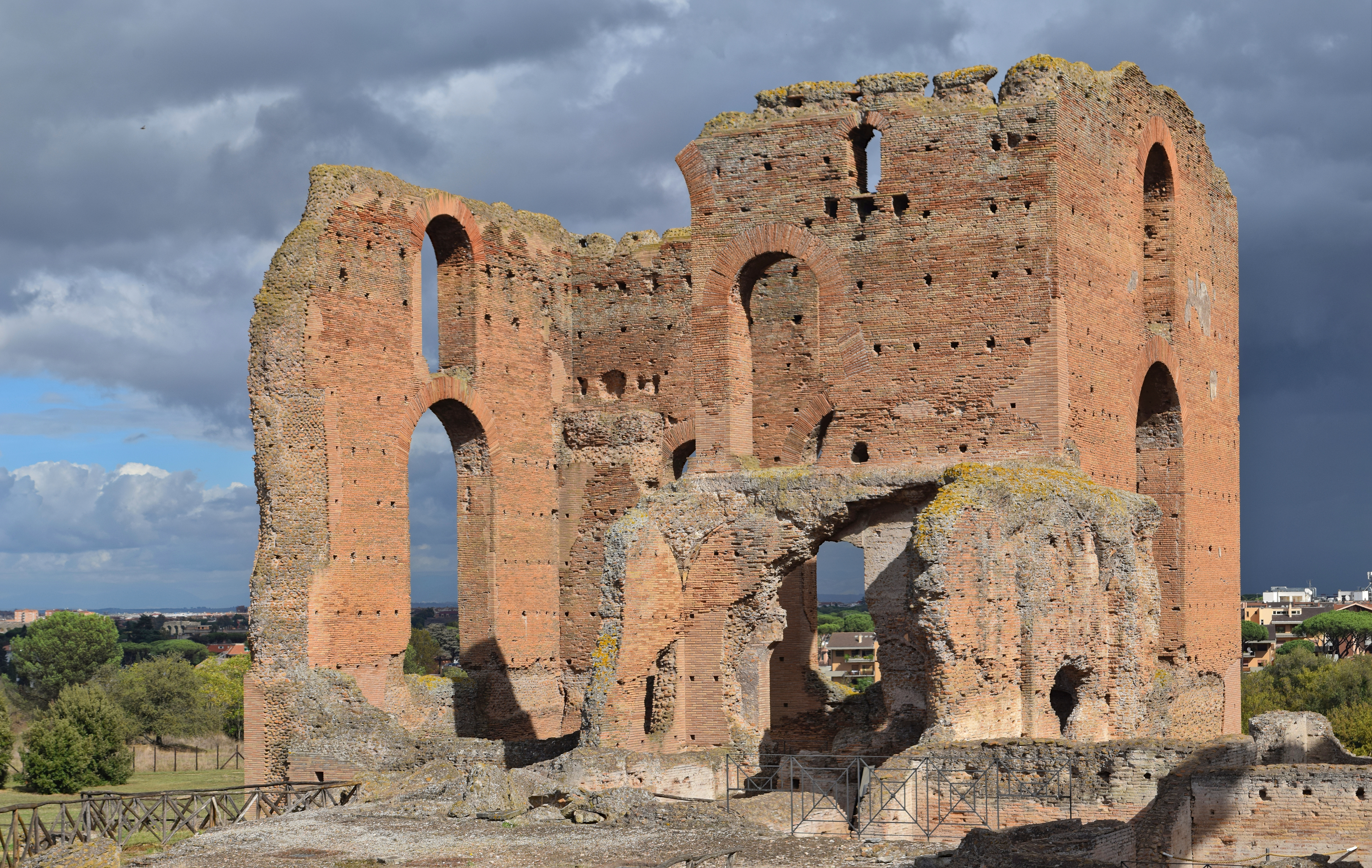
Calidarium

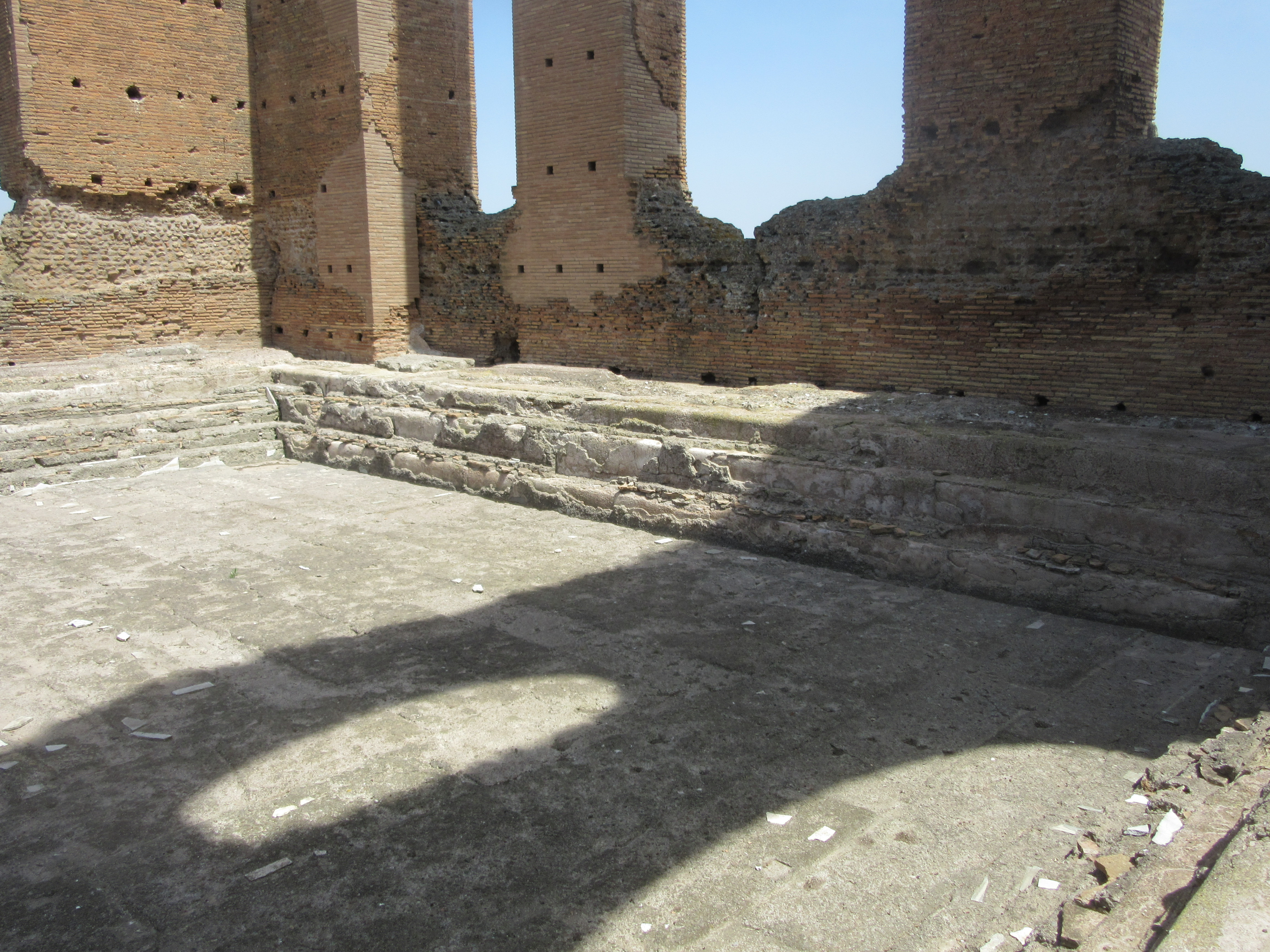
Calidarium pool

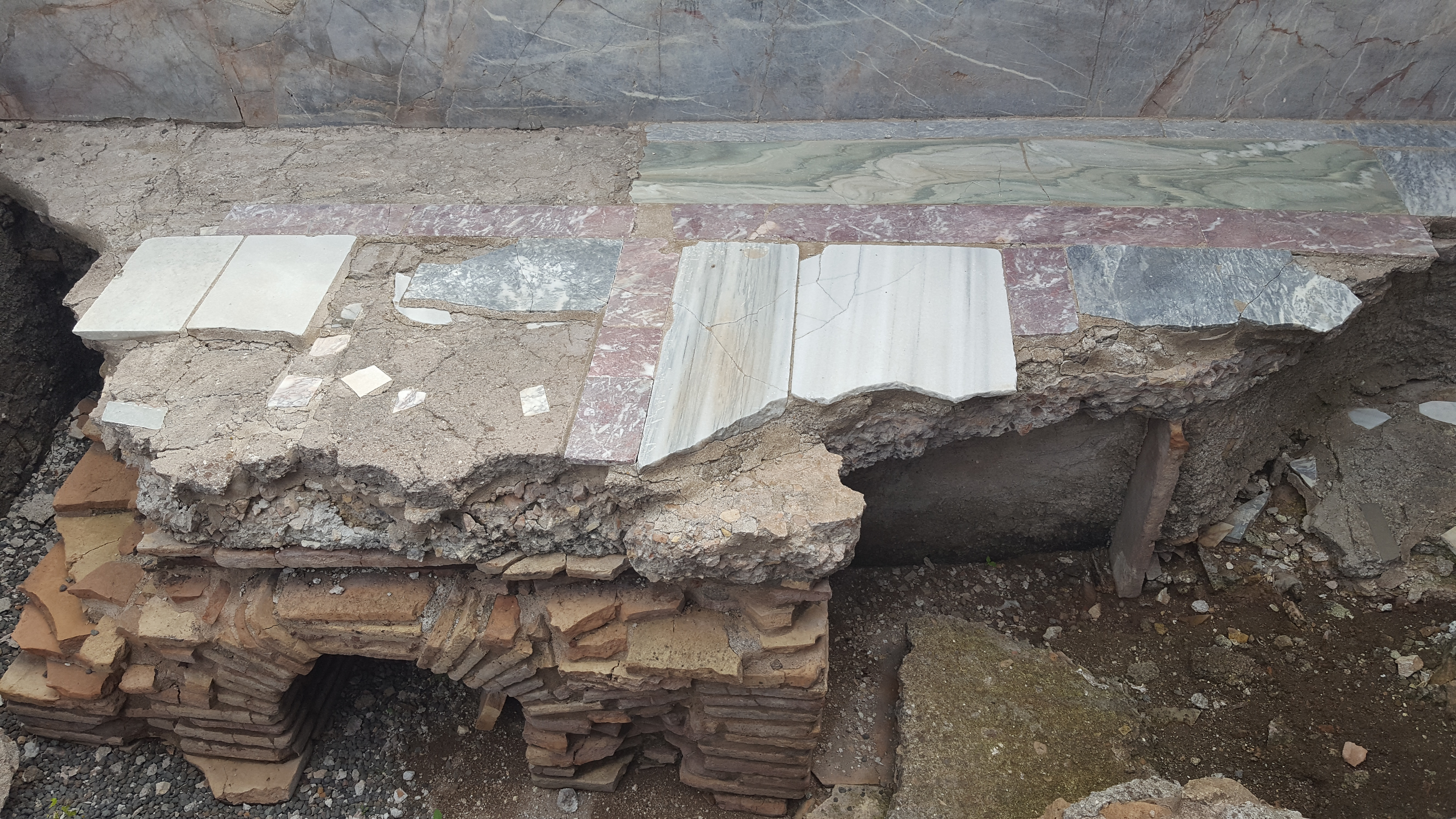
Calidarium hypocaust with Opus sectile floor

=== The exedra/theatre ===
This large semicircular space or exedra was originally bordered by a portico decorated with Cipollino marble columns with corinthian capitals and white attic marble bases, some of which are still in their original positions. In the centre was an impluvium pool. It is dated to 123 due to the discovery of brick stamps of the consuls Apronianus and Paetinus and of Cecilia Quintia Sulpician.

The exedra led to the circular summer triclinium (dining room) from where one had a prime view over the later stage of the theatre.

The seating, of three steps covered with marble slabs, and the stage of the theatre date to Commodus, as discovered in excavations in 2011-12. After the death of Commodus the theatre was covered by flooring and radial walls and also basins and fountains were added.

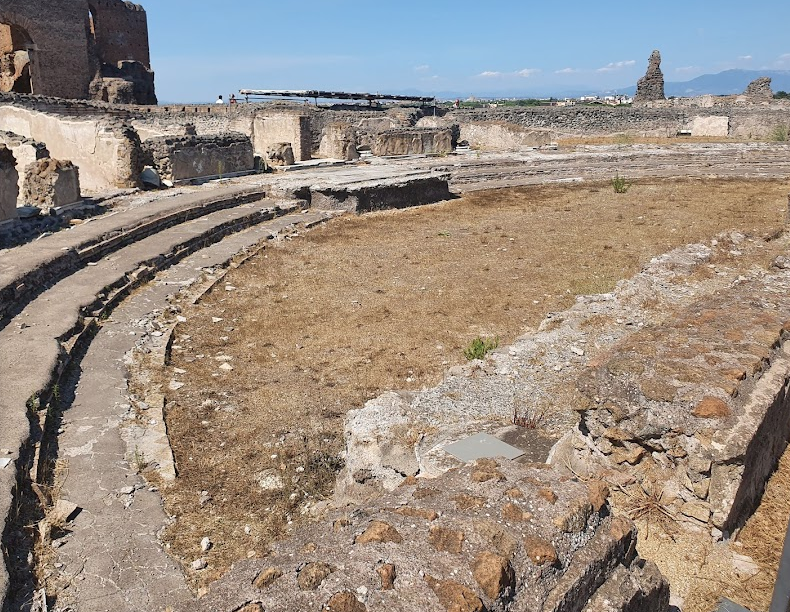
The theatre

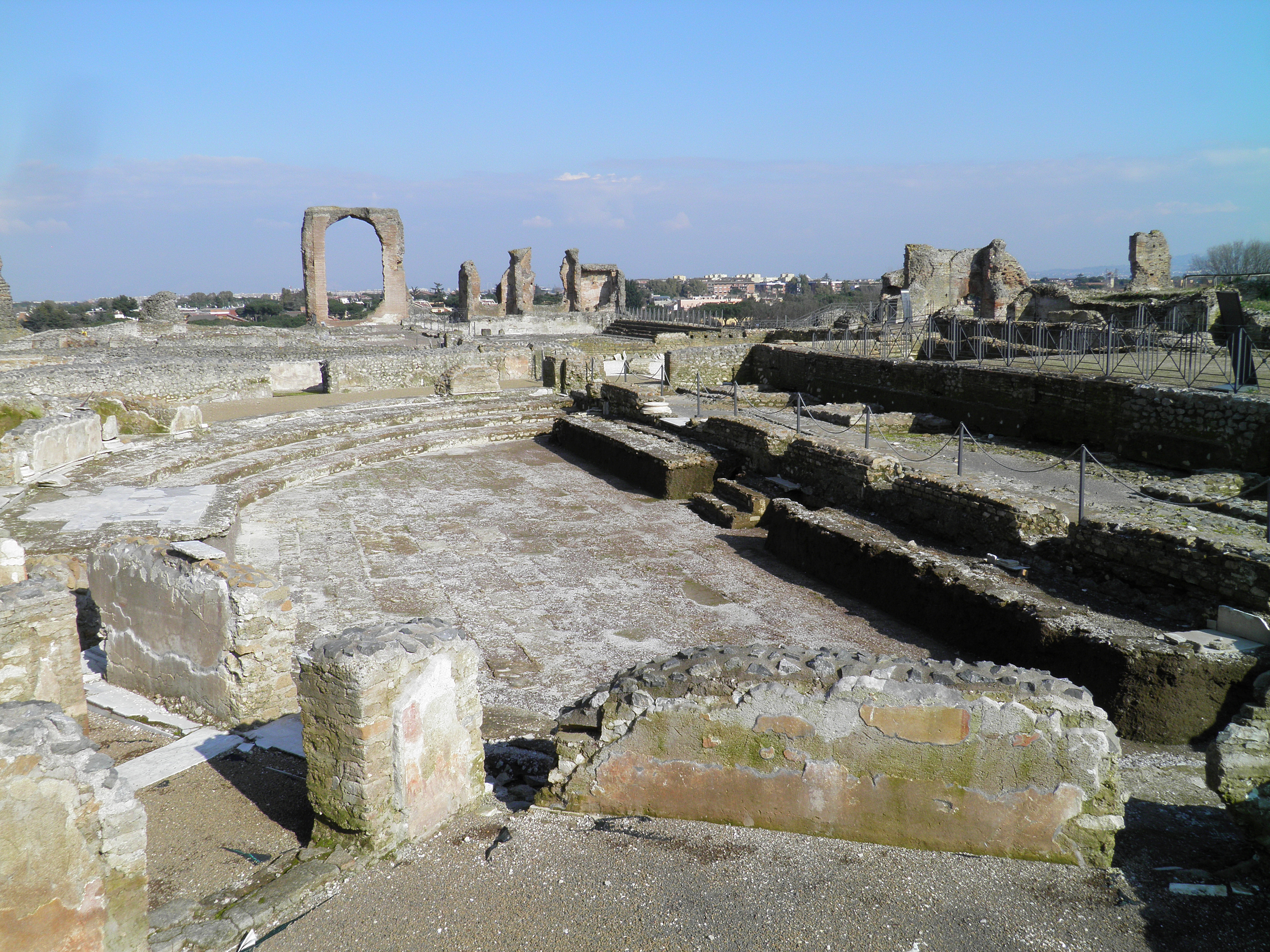
The theatre

=== The garden/amphitheatre ===
This elliptical building was earlier known as the “Maritime Theatre” (after that of Hadrian's Villa), but was originally a small amphitheatre or ludus built under Commodus for gladiators to train and perform and for animal hunts. It used an existing building but was never completed and after the death of the emperor it was converted into a garden or viridarium and surrounded by a portico.

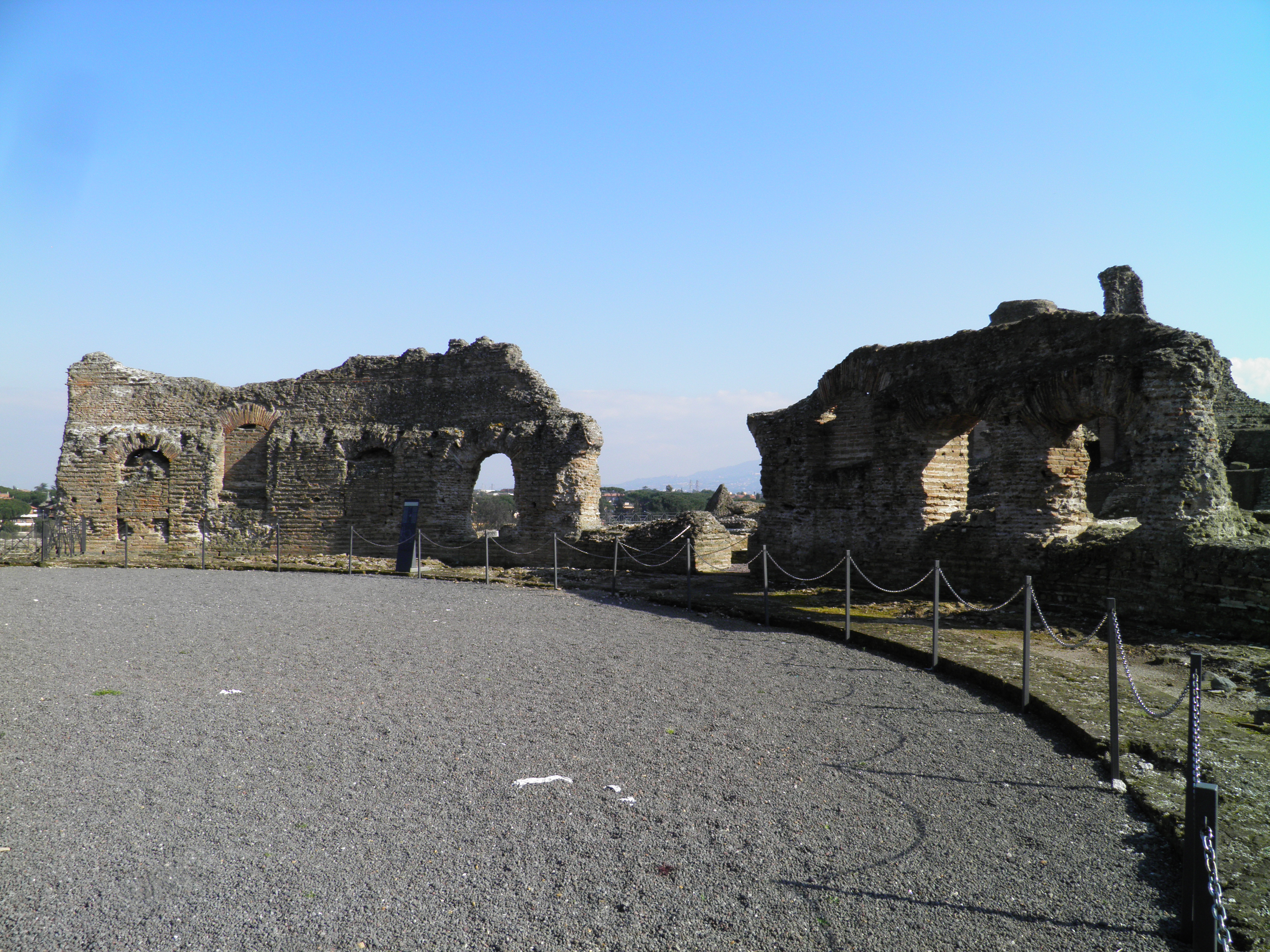

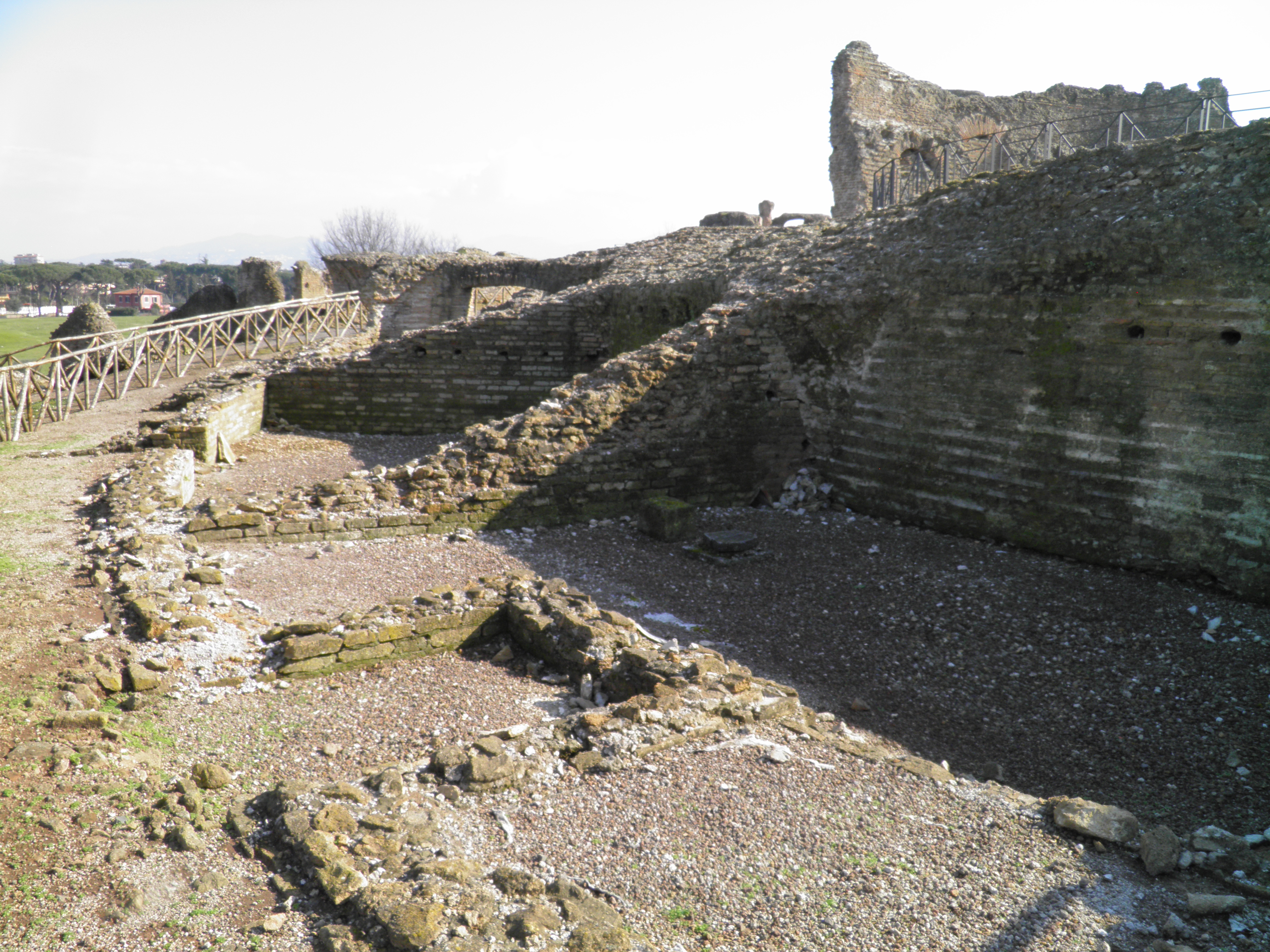

=== The Xysti ===
These roughly 300 m-long covered porticoes lay at about 90 m from each other on each side of the vast garden to the southwest of the villa that must have been cultivated with trees and shrubs between pools and water. The one to the north was for walking, the other to the south for running due to the presence of sauna amd massage rooms.

They were built at the end of the 2nd century under the emperors to allow indoor exercise in poor weather; at the end of the building the two outer walls delineated a curvilinear 'hourglass' space which allowed runners an easy turn. The southern xystus connected the residential part of the Villa with the large nymphaeum on the Via Appia and also supported the aqueduct. The porticos are unpaved but have a beaten earth floor, with Cipollino marble skirting on the walls.

The walls of the south xystus were built north of, and near to, the earlier niched wall that supported the aqueduct feeding the Large Nymphaeum starting from the Large Cistern. The two southern walls of the three are still visible built with opus listatum (rows of bricks alternating with rows of tuff blocks). The central wall, which was the rear wall of the portico, is still partially covered with Cipollino marble slabs while the foundations alone of the northernmost wall are preserved. Excavations in 2017-18 in the space between the niche wall and the central wall revealed about 19 small heated rooms at regular intervals of about 11 m, for saunas and rooms for massages linked to sports activities.

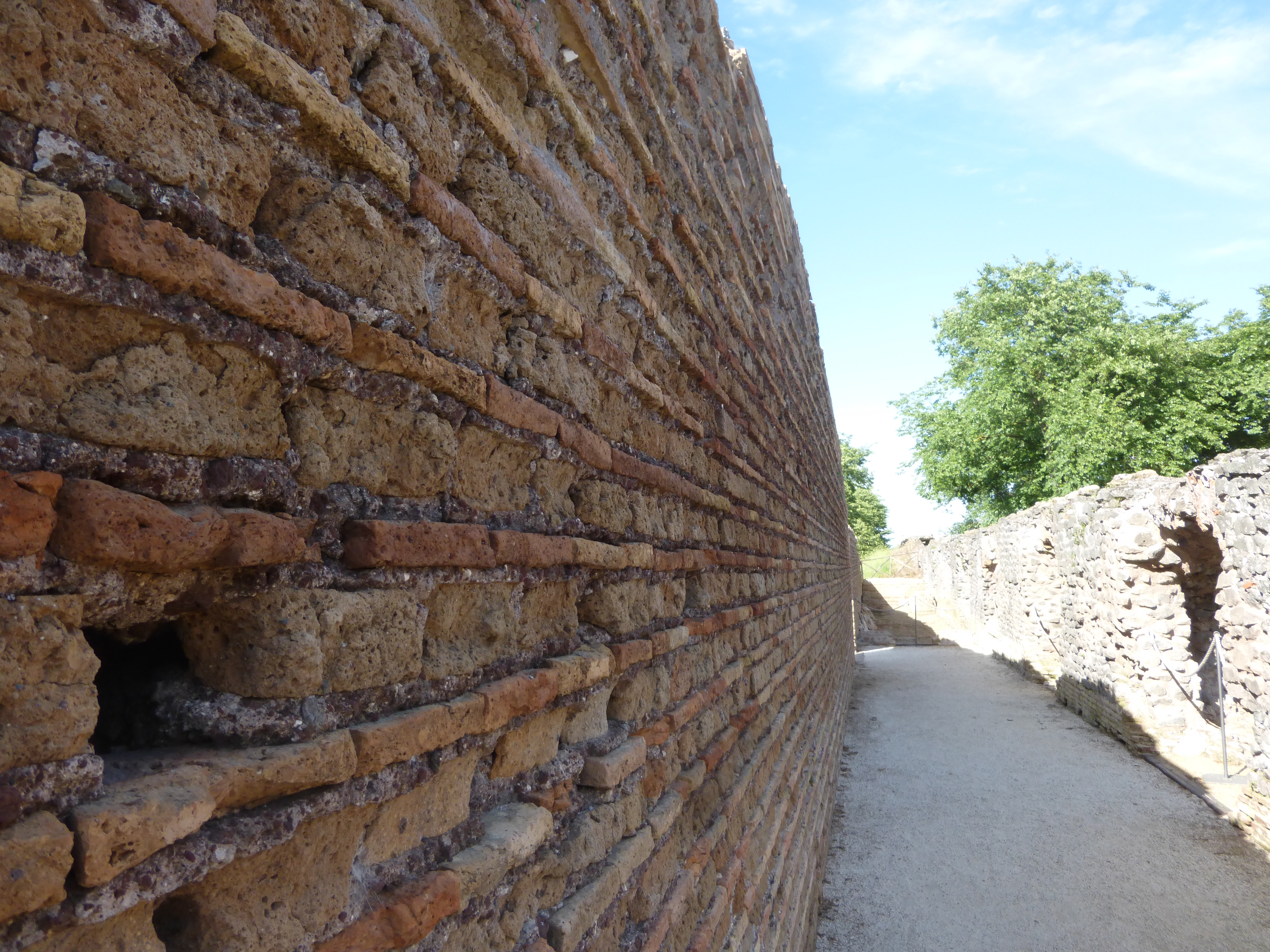
Xystus in opus listatum

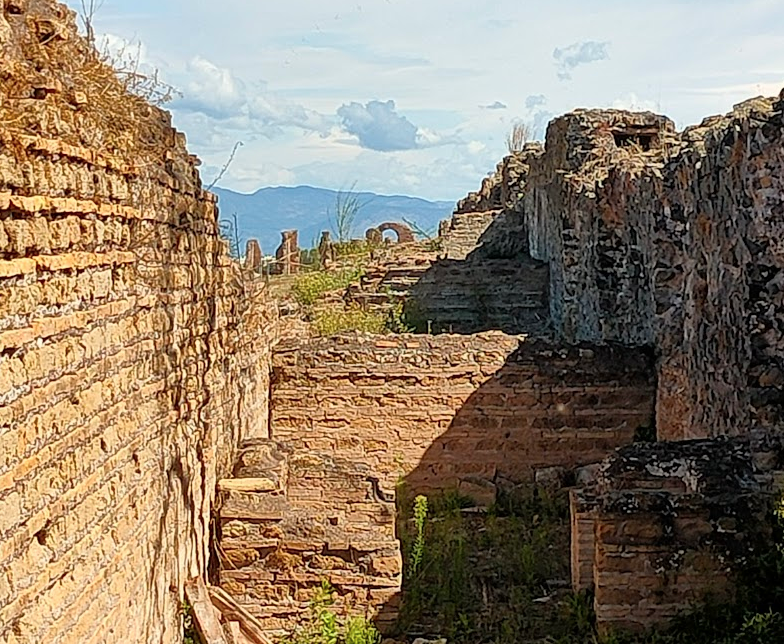
A sauna of the xystus

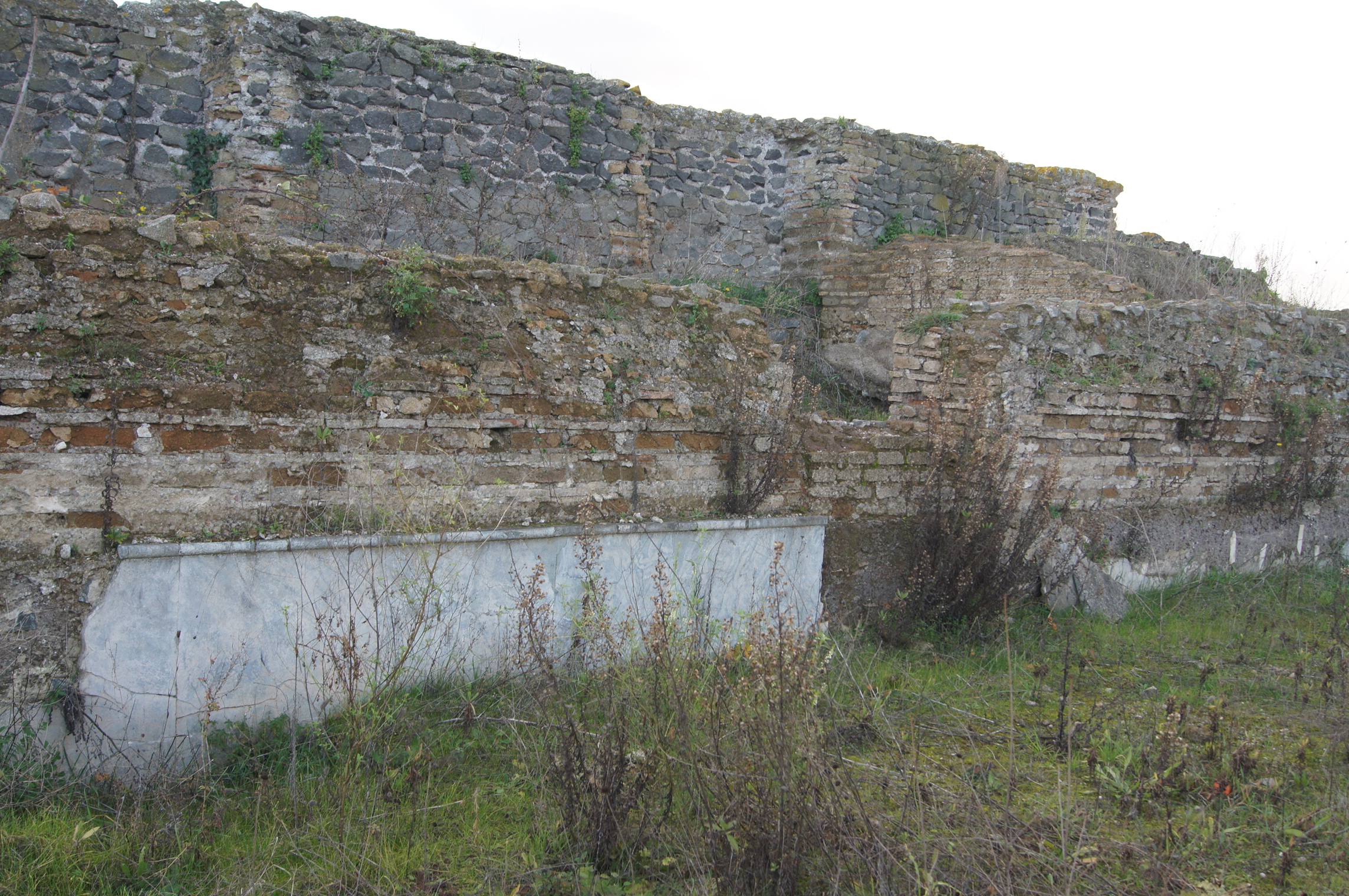
marble cladding

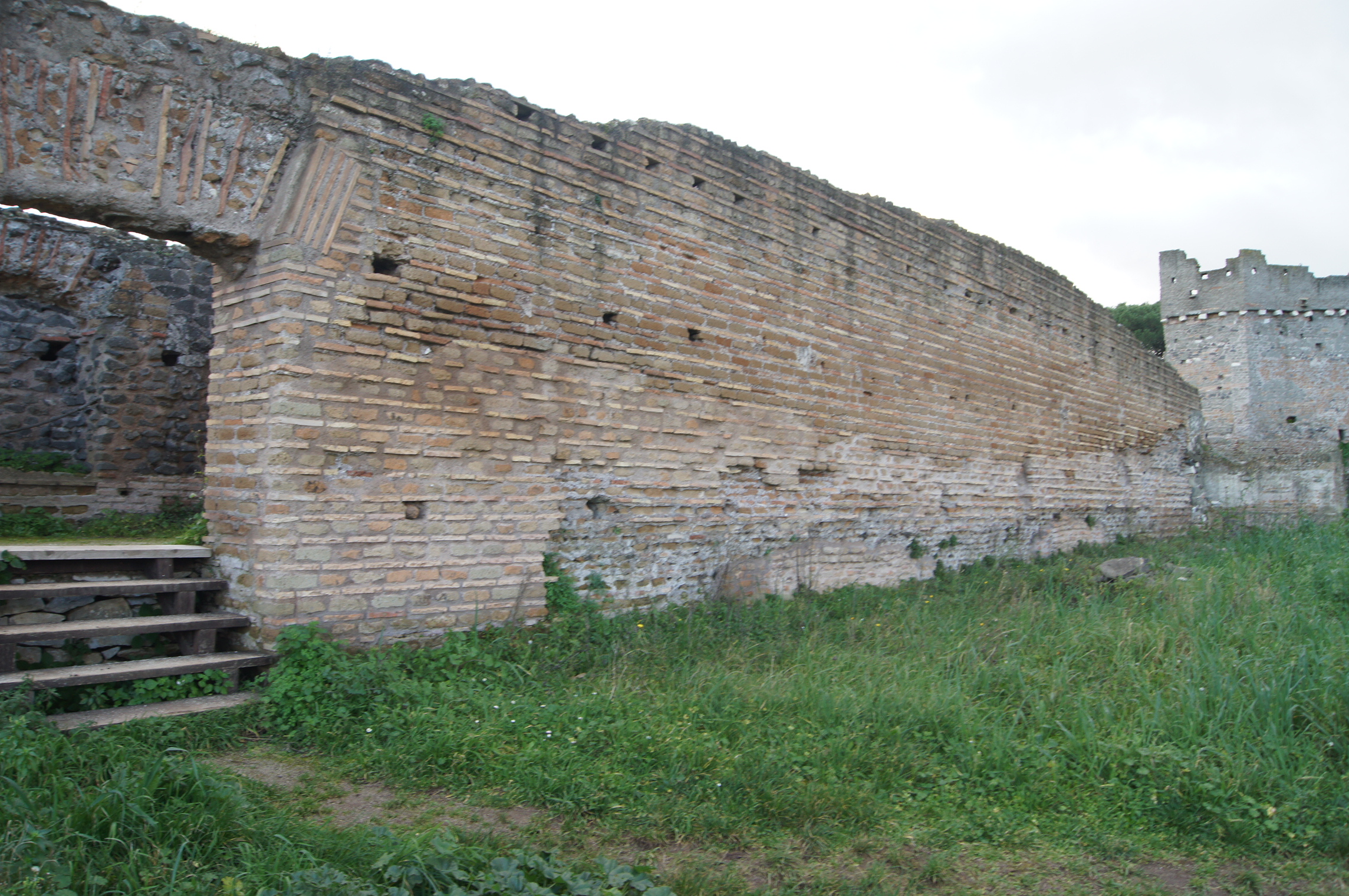

=== Circus ===
The circus for chariot races was about 500 m long and had a north-south orientation, the majority lying today under private land. It was built by Commodus but demolished and razed to the foundations following his condemnation to damnatio memoriae (erasure of memory) after his death. The only element that survived the destruction was the western tower and the starting gates for horses (carceres) brought to light in excavations of 2017-18. The curvilinear walls of the end of the circus with the central entrance gate and the eastern tower were overbuilt by the later winery-triclinium. A bath complex (small baths) visible towards the eastern edge of the plateau was almost certainly connected to the imperial dais.

=== The Nymphaeum ===
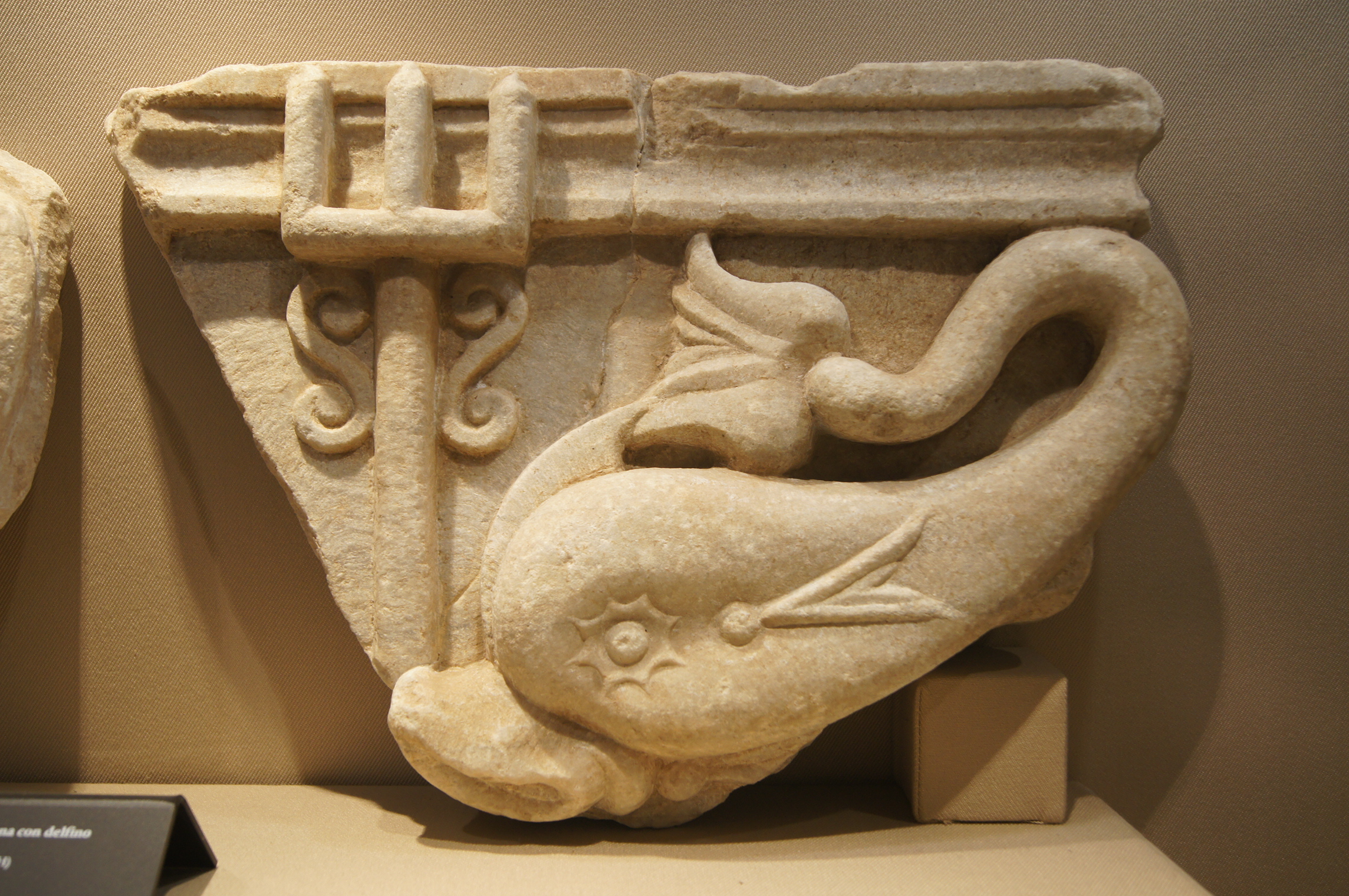
from the nymphaeum

The Nymphaeum was a monumental fountain built by Commodus with a scenic backdrop decorated with statues and sculptural groups. From cisterns behind the façade water flowed into tanks and basins decorated with marble slabs and mosaics. Facing and close to the Via Appia, it was visible to any who travelled along through a vast opening marked by 4 marble columns (today 3 remain). The passage tunnel on the south-east side connected the monumental front of the nymphaeum with the long portico that bordered the southern xystus where the great statue of Niobe, on display today in the antiquarium, was discovered in the excavations of 2002-04.

Many statues and decorations, and a dolium filled with mosaic tiles of glass paste, were found abandoned near the portico showing that after the 4th century the area of the nymphaeum was used as a depository of various materials from the villa.

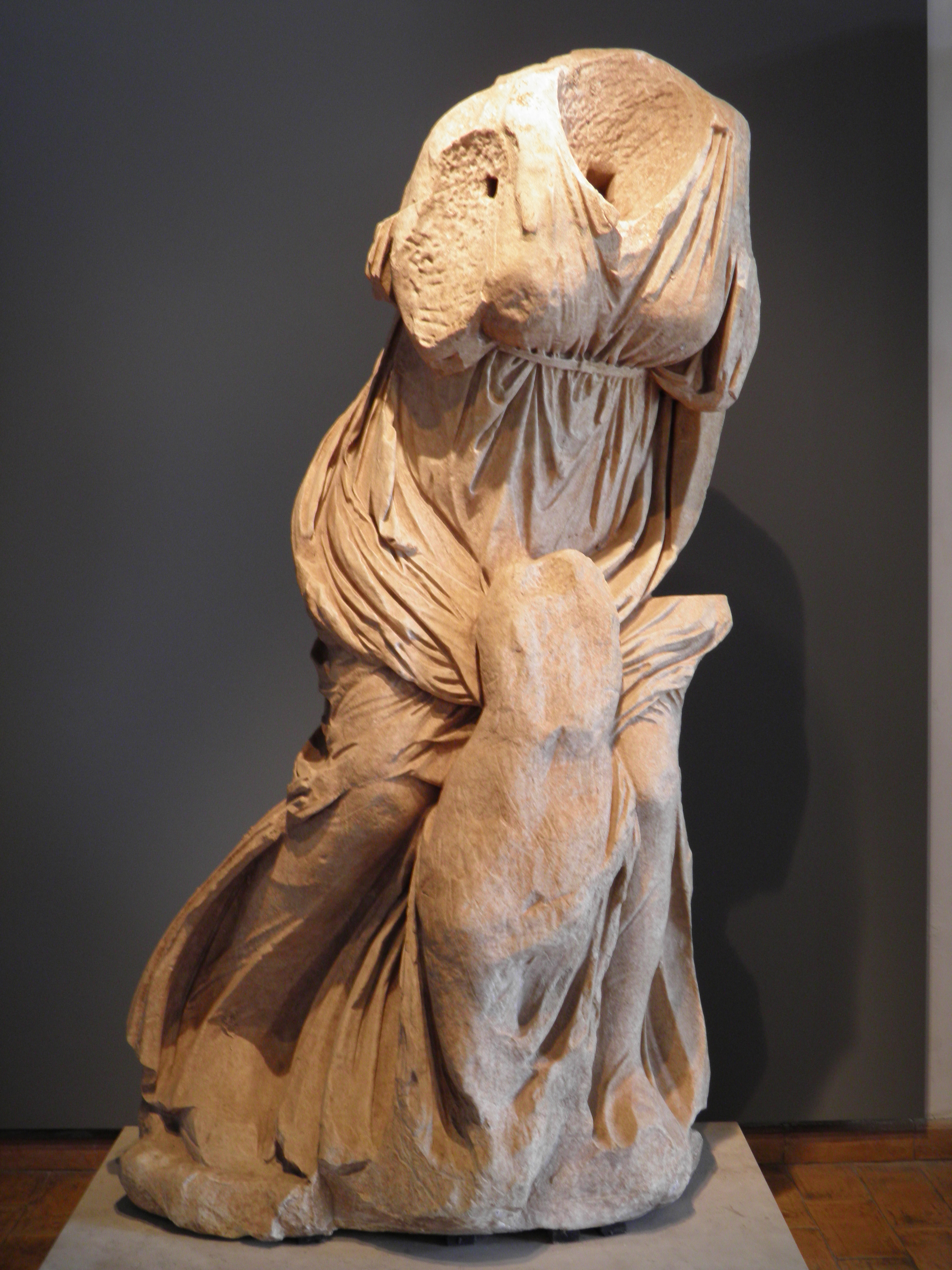
Niobe from the nymphaeum

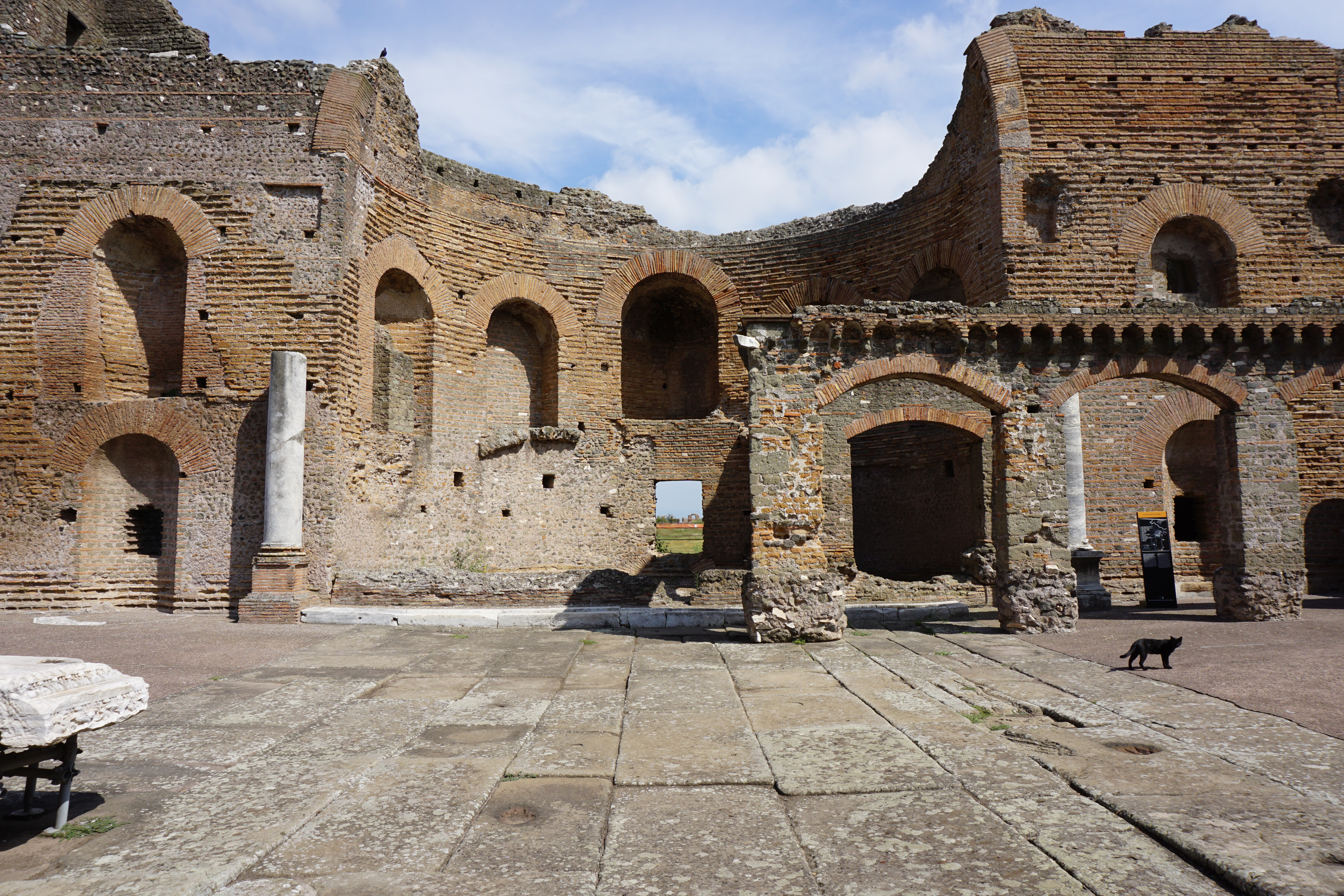

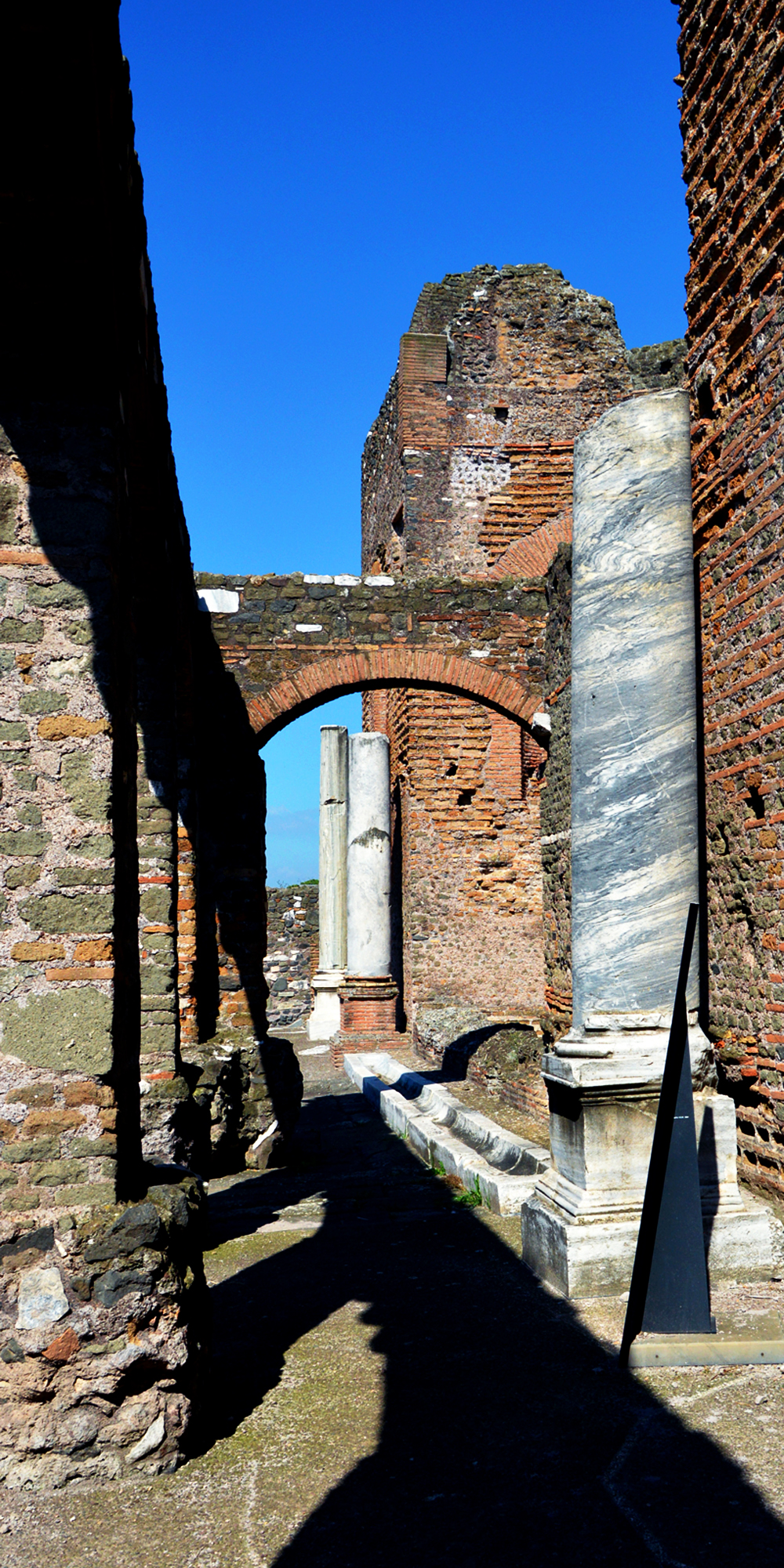

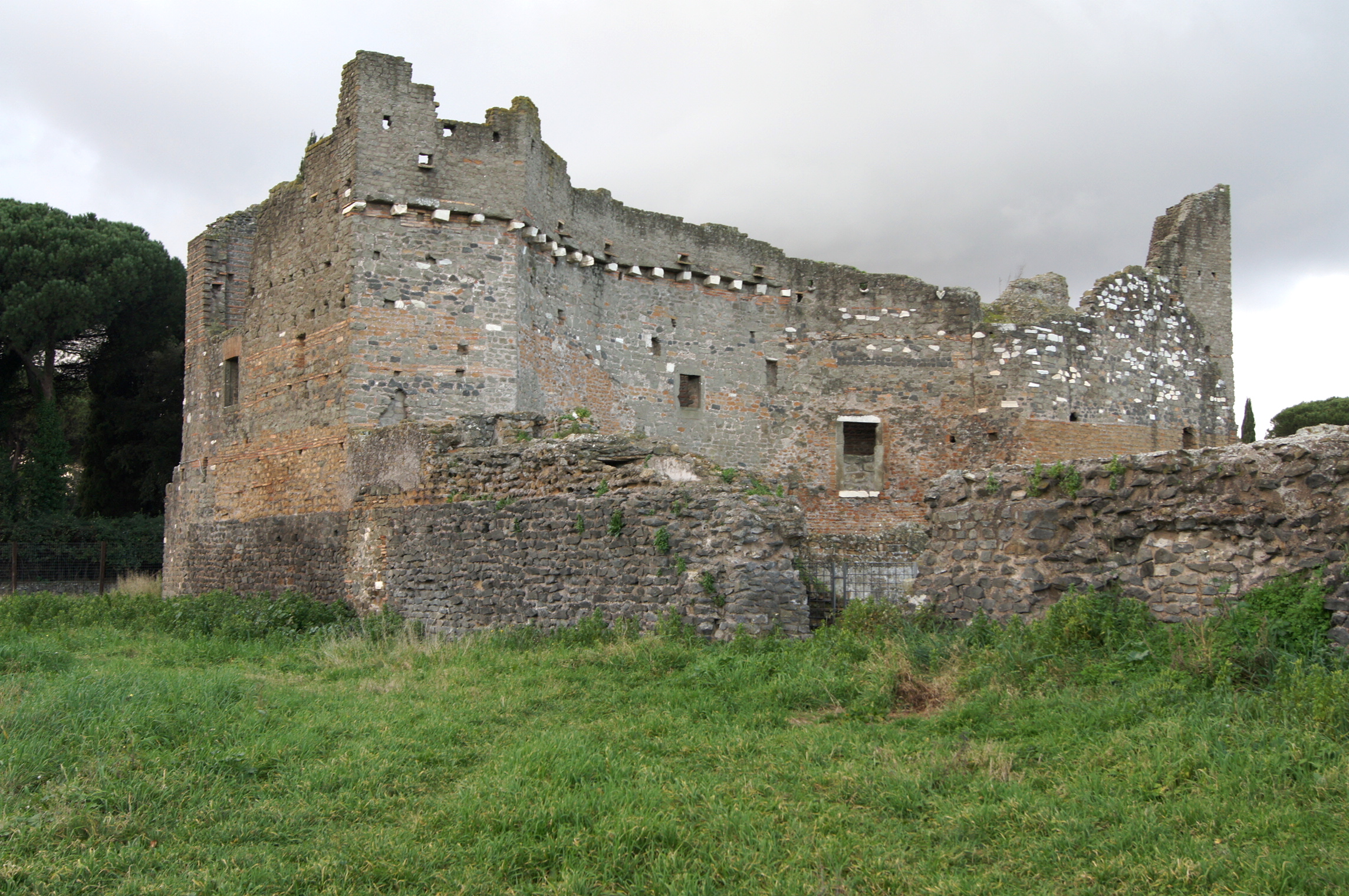
southern side and aqueduct

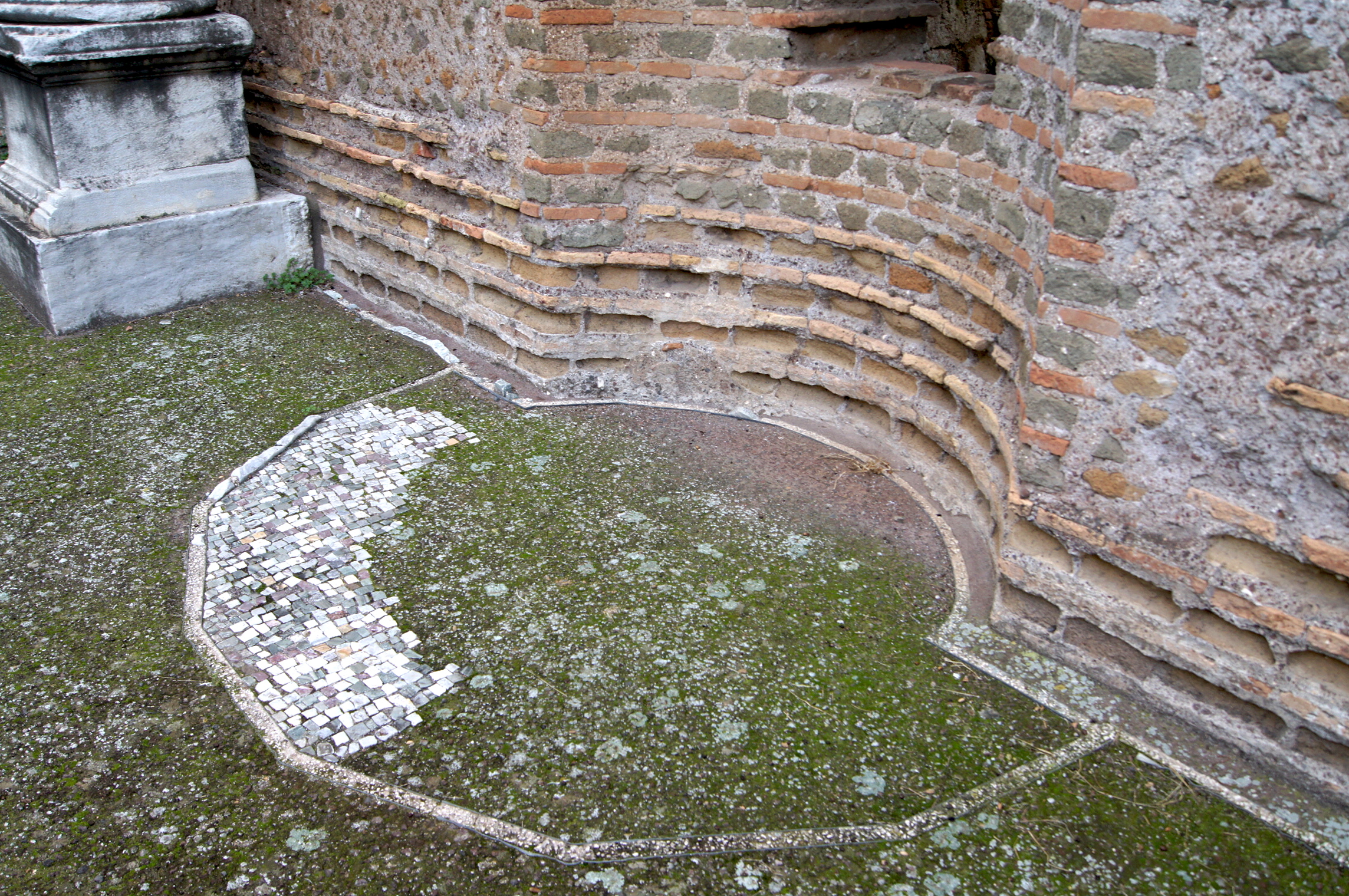
fountain basin

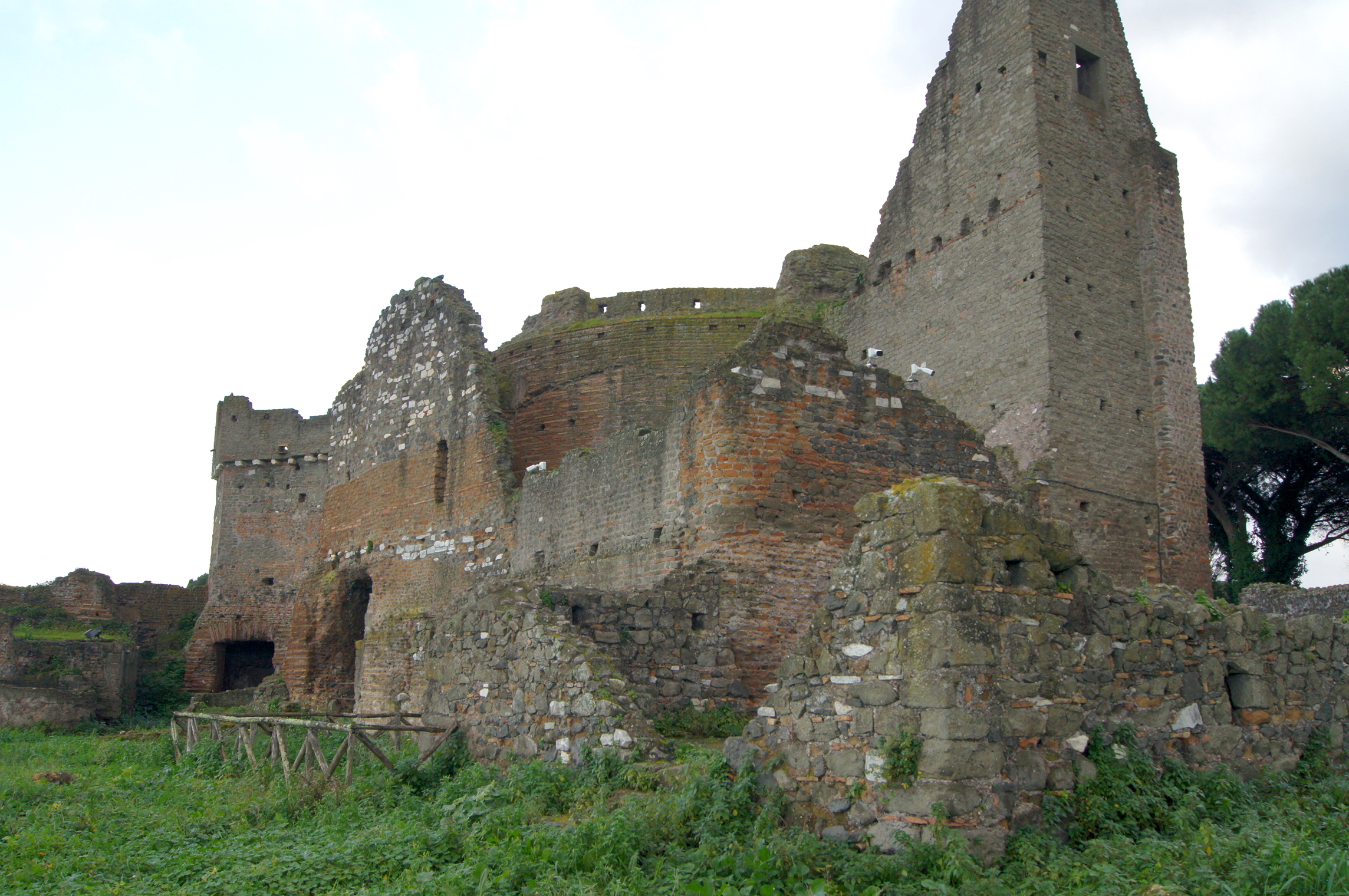
from north

=== The Winery-triclinium ===
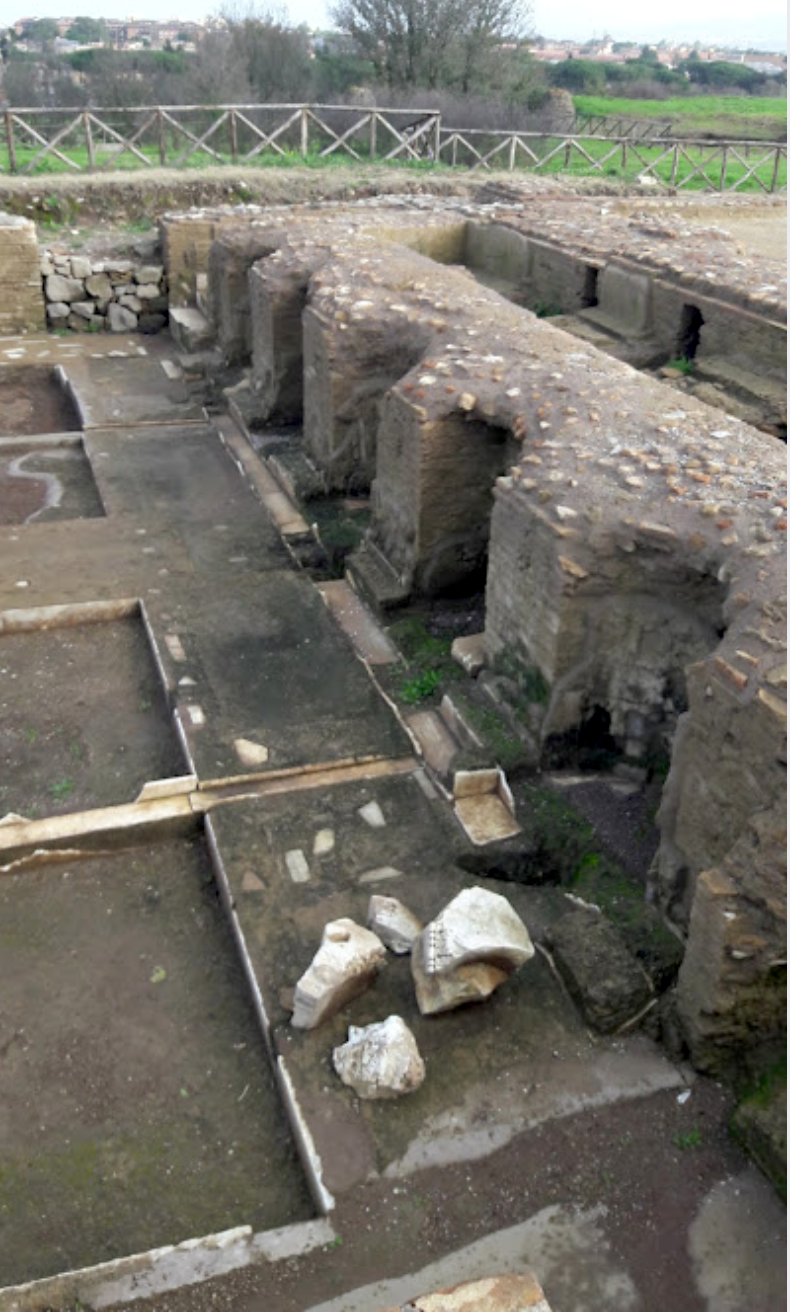
Winery

In 2018 excavations uncovered an extravagant and extraordinary winery and triclinium which features marble-clad instead of the usual opus signinum treading areas and a distribution system with fountains of wine that flowed from the production spaces down into the cellar. The facility has equipment normally found in ancient Roman wineries, but the level of decoration and theatre indicate that it served a more unusual purpose of conspicuous production and potential vintage ritual for the elite of imperial Roman society. Triclinia (dining rooms) with wide entrances surrounded this winery area on three sides, their walls and floors covered in elaborate opus sectile with exotic marbles in geometrical patterns, indicating that the emperor entertained here around the theatrical spectacle of wine production. It is similar to the ceremonial winery of the imperial Villa Magna in Latium. It is dated to the reign of Gordian III (r. 238-244 AD) and was built over the foundations of the earlier circus starting gates.

=== Quintilii aqueduct ===
The monumental Quintilii aqueduct was built to supply the villa’s many baths, fountains, nymphaeum and gardens which required an enormous quantity of water. It probably branched off the Anio Novus aqueduct, but could have been supplied from the large settling pool near the current Capannelle Hippodrome. It runs about 700 m on about 120 massive arches after which it reached a castellum aquae (distribution tank) at the 7th mile of the via Appia from where an underground conduit branched off to supply the villa.

The demolition of some arches and the blocking of others with tuff walls could be the work of Vitiges who, in the Siege of Rome (537–538) during the last Gothic war, used the arches of sections of the nearby Claudia and Marcia aqueducts to create a fort for 7000 men and block supplies to the city from the via Appia and Latina.

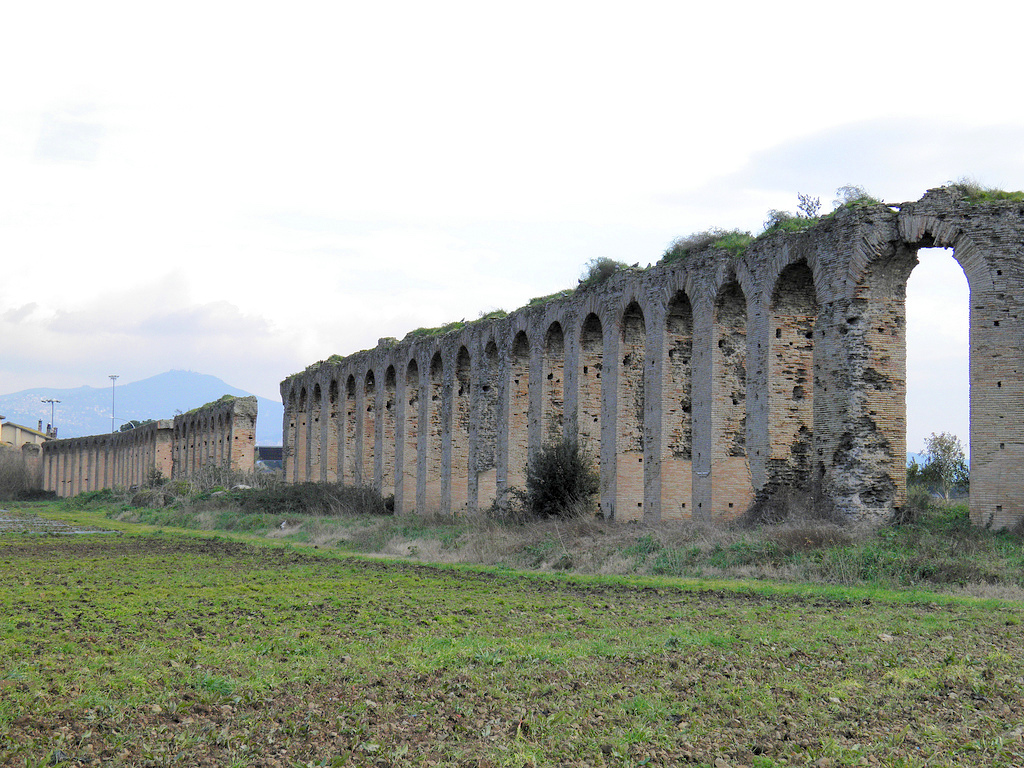
Quintilii Aqueduct main section

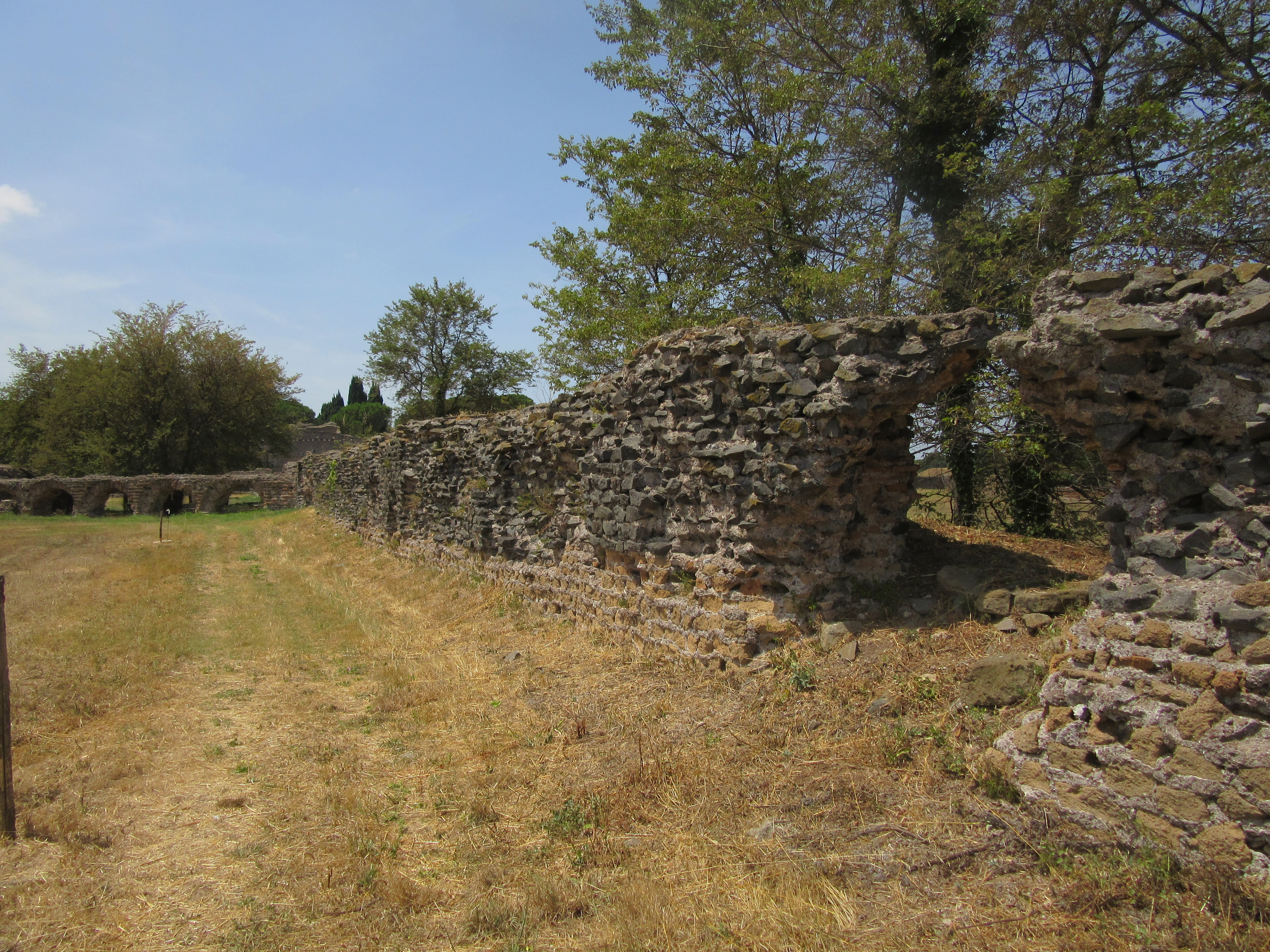
aqueduct on south of garden

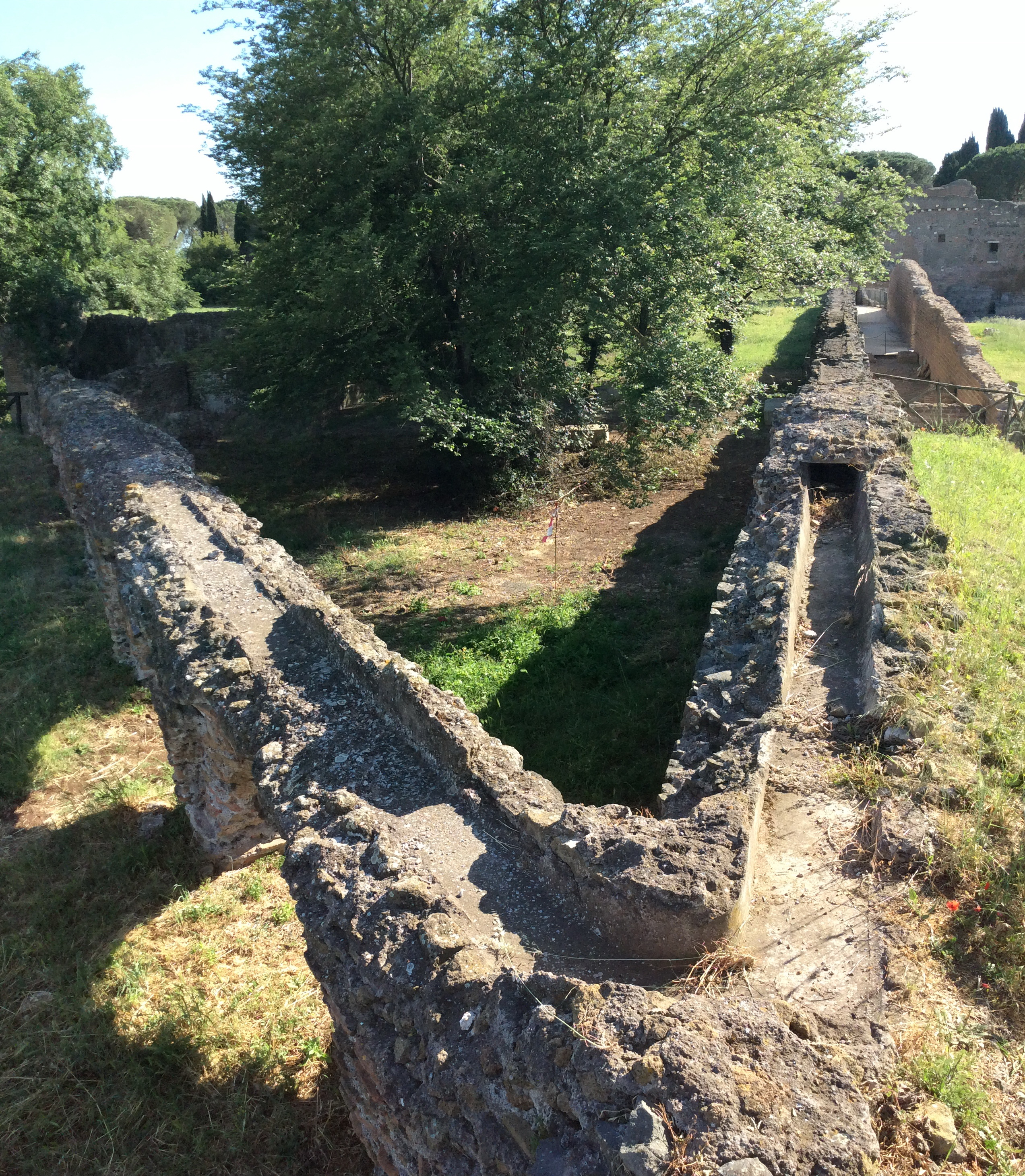
branch to nymphaeum cistern

=== Santa Maria Nova ===
The medieval Casale di Santa Maria Nova was built over a Roman cistern alongside thermal baths and other buildings, as excavations since 2013 have shown. The Roman building is thought to have been accommodation for guests during the earliest phase of the villa and was probably later made into a military garrison for the imperial villa to control the entrance from the Appian Way. The Casale of Santa Maria Nova included three hectares of countryside dotted with ruins but was neglected for 10 years until the purchase by the State in 2006.

In the baths two well-preserved monochrome mosaic floors on hypocausts are exceptional: one depicting a gladiator (a retiarius, carrying a net and trident) named Montanused with a referee in the act of awarding the victory; on the other, four horses race in pairs around a tree. The latter are probably the fationes, the “teams” that competed in the chariot races in the circus.

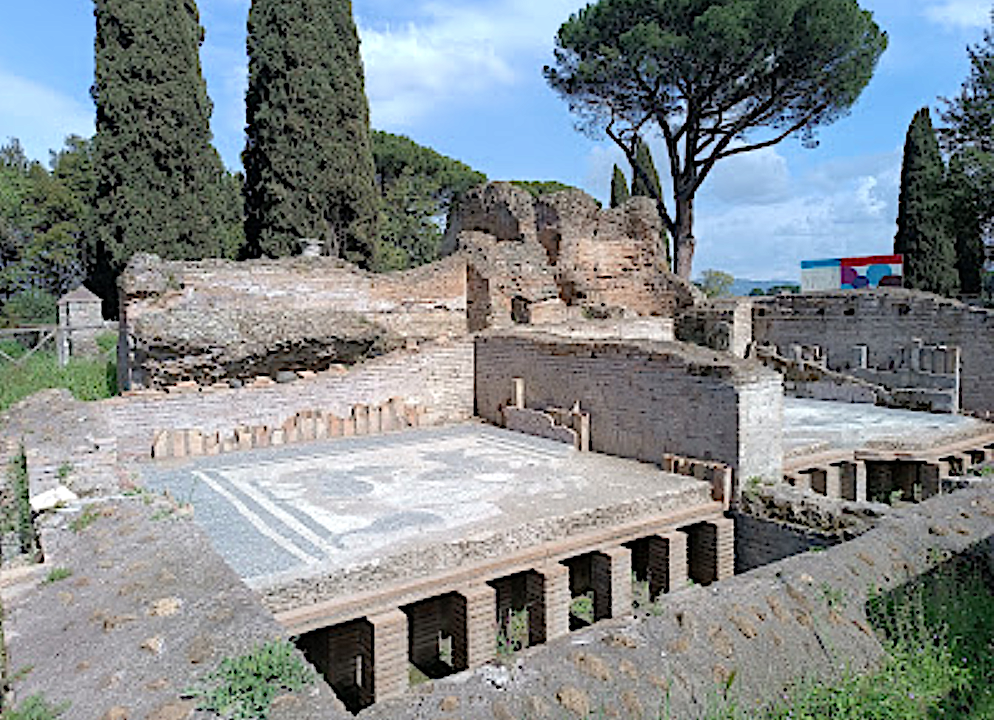
Santa Maria Nova mosaics

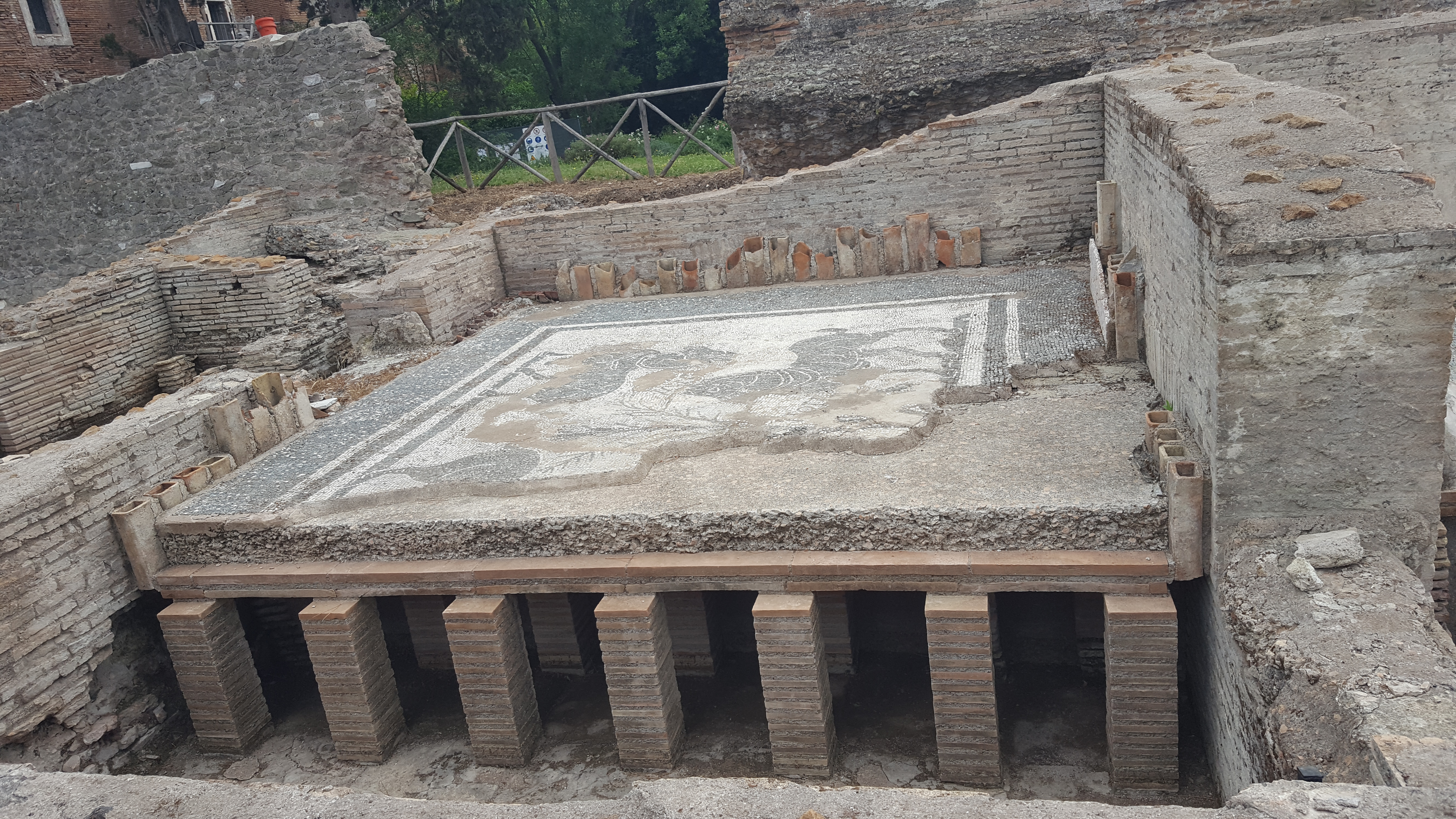
’Retiarius’’ mosaic floor

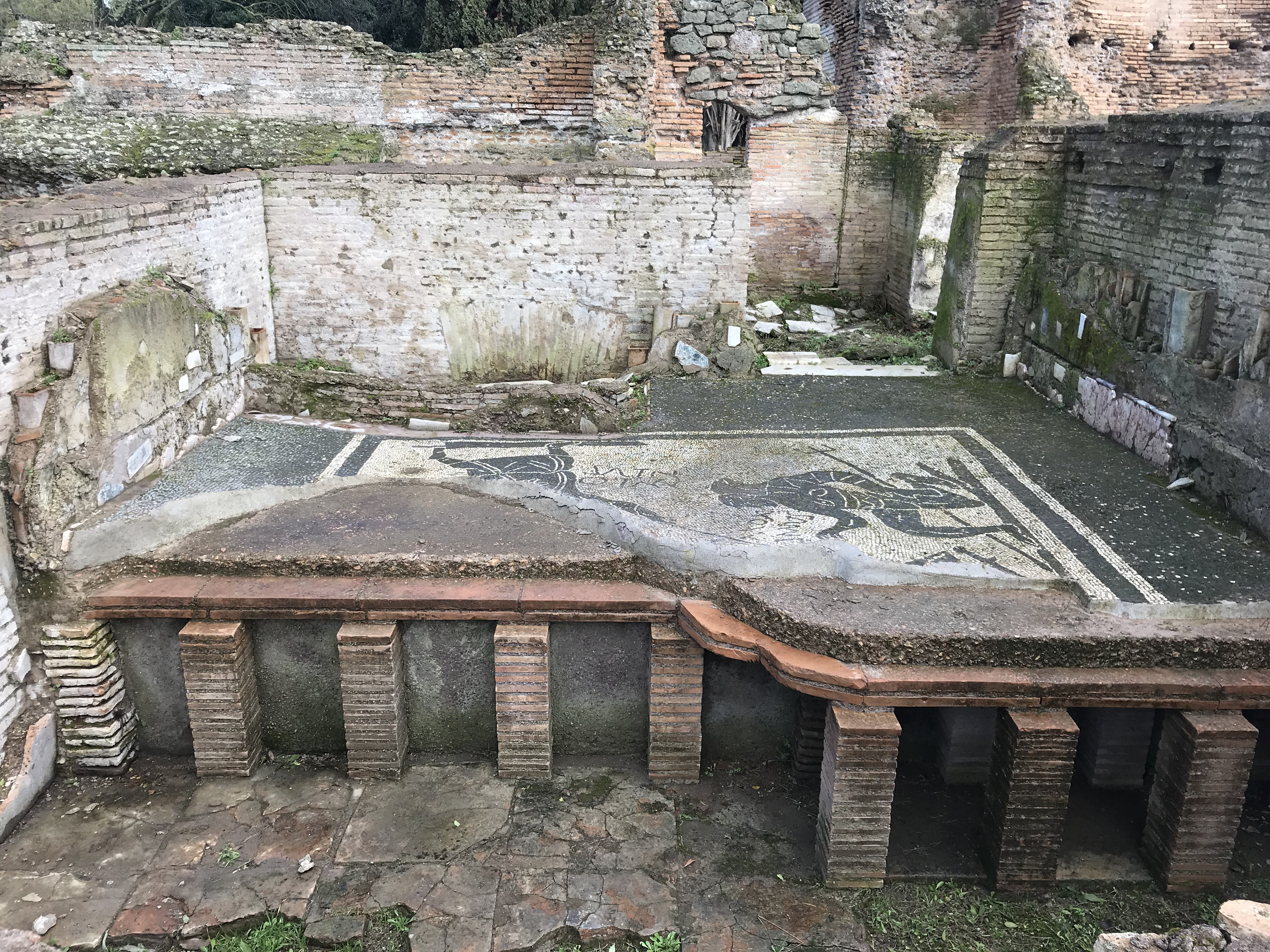
Horse race mosaic floor

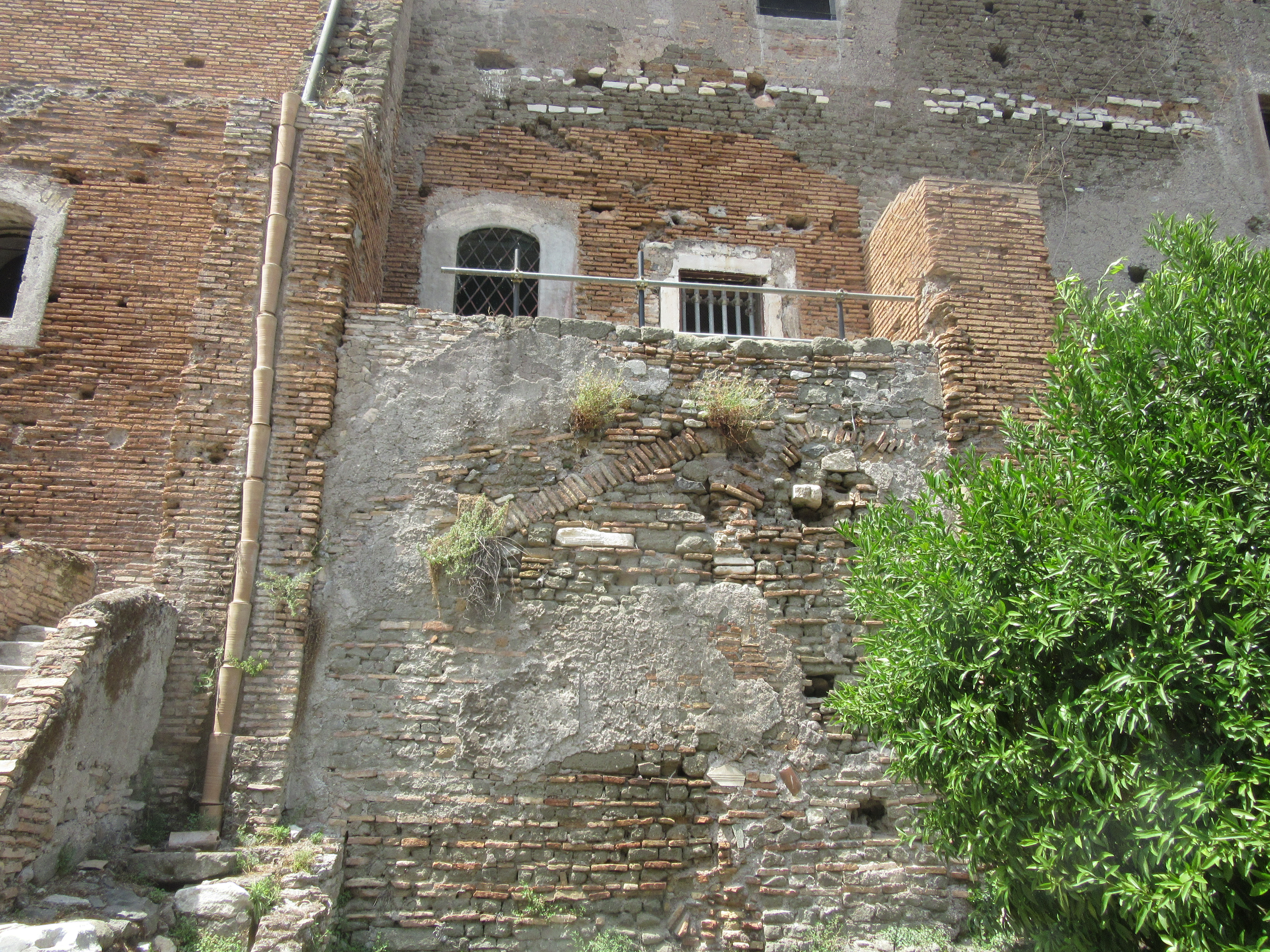

=== Cisterns ===
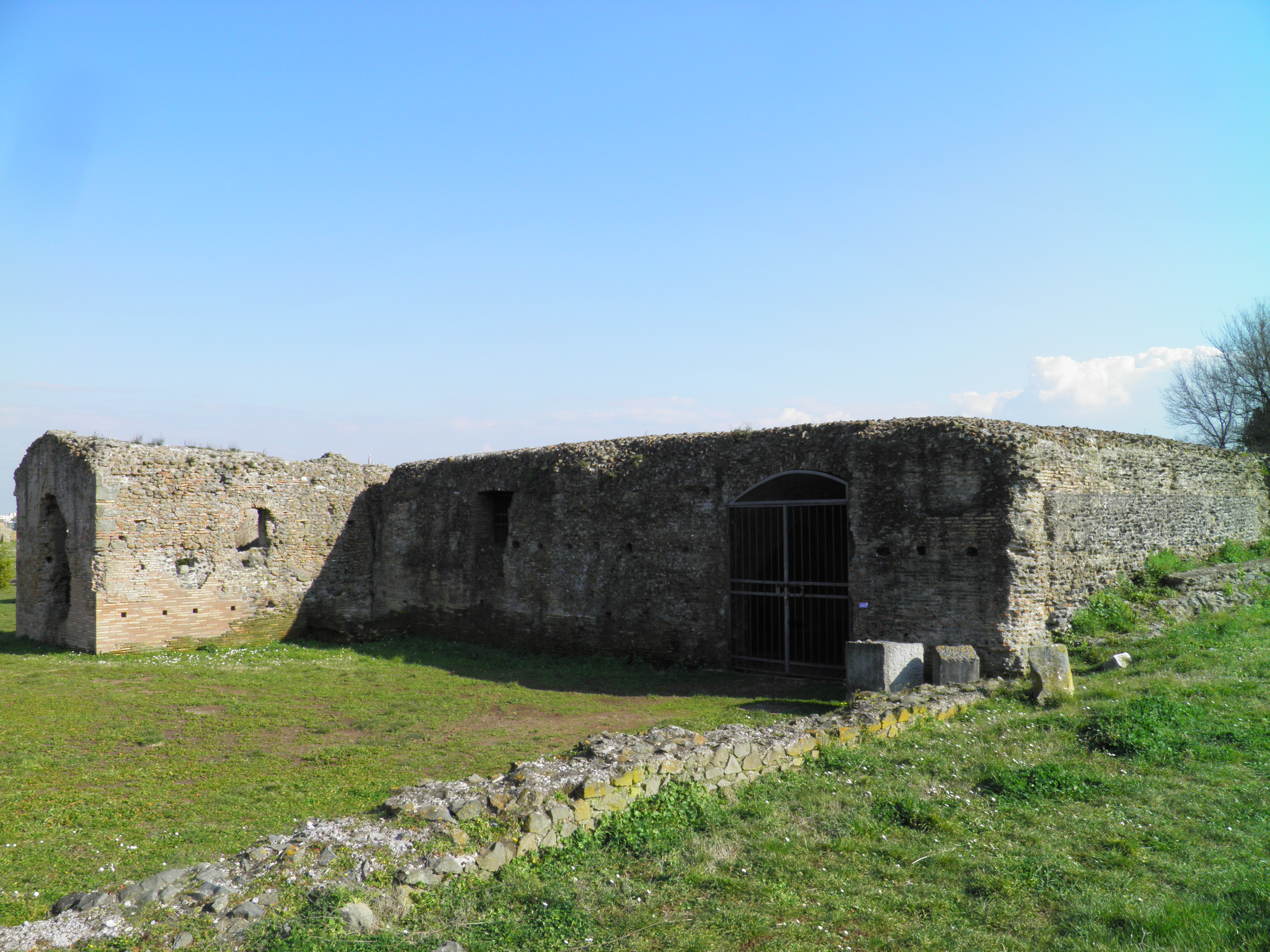
Great cistern

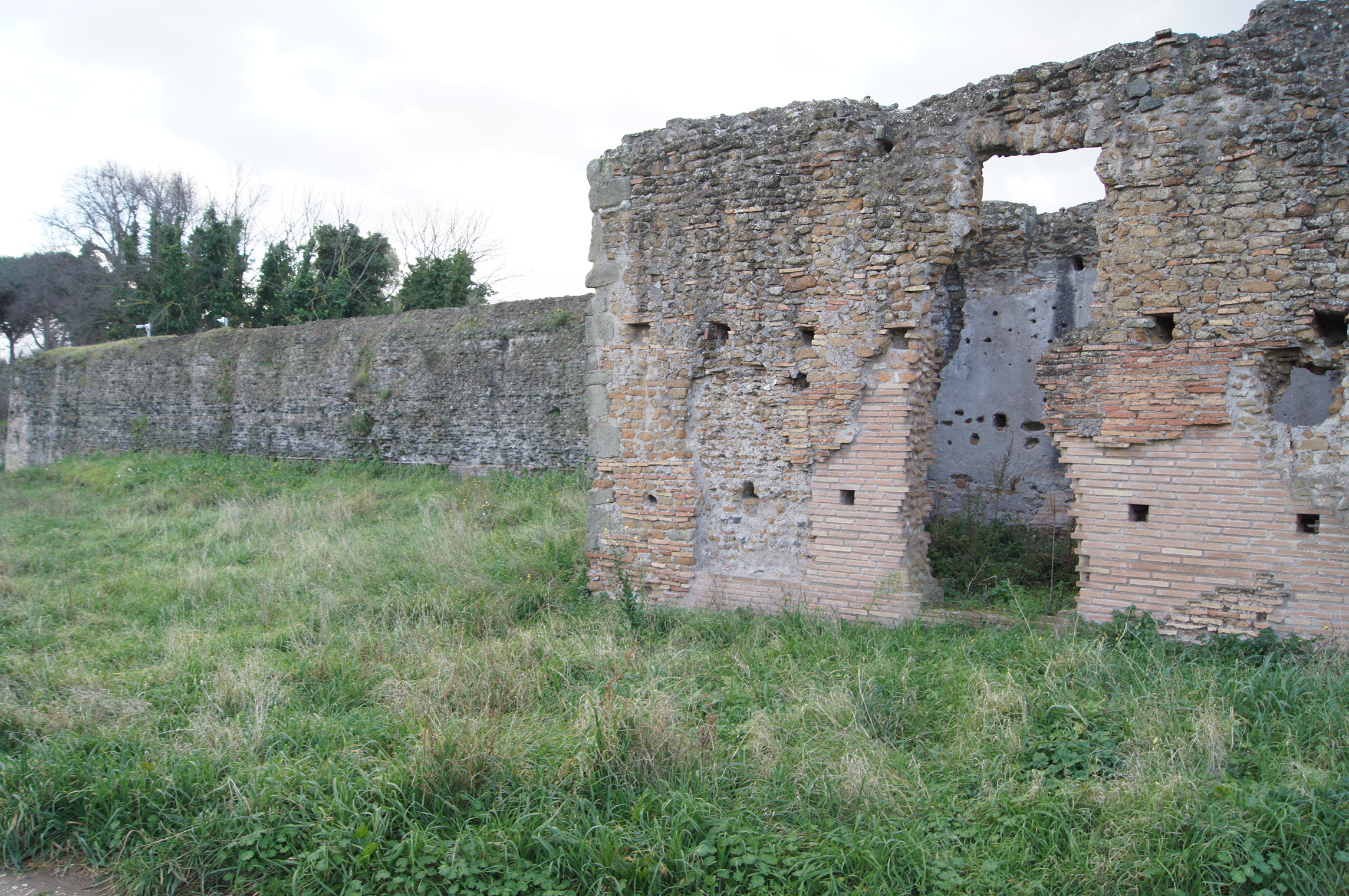
Great cistern

Many cisterns for water storage were built on the highest part of the plateau on which the villa stands. The most impressive, the rectangular Great Cistern is on the highest part of the plateau along the western side of the circus and was fed by the Quintilii aqueduct running along its western wall. It fed the Large Nymphaeum via the aqueduct supported by the niche wall on the south of the garden. Excess water exited on the opposite side through a drain. It is internally divided in two aisles by central pillars that supported the cross vaulted ceiling. The finish of hydraulic plaster (cocciopesto) ensured impermeability of the walls and the floors.

The "central" cistern located south of the Nymphaeum received the excess return water coming from the Nymphaeum through a small arched aqueduct branch still visible today. This cistern, datable between the end of the 1st and the beginning of the 2nd century, is completely covered with cocciopesto plaster on two levels; the plan has two aisles divided by a series of 7 pillars on the upper level and 17 on the lower level. The two floors are connected by four square wells, two of which were subsequently sealed. The height extension in peperino blocks dates from the Middle Ages. Of particular note is the presence of a seasonal outdoor pond where there was a large basin in Roman times, perhaps for the breeding of fish.

==== Circus cistern ====
To the south-west of the main villa on a slight rise in the ground, stands a large concrete cistern that constituted the heart of the complex's water supply, served directly by a branch of the Quintilii aqueduct of which the bottom of the specus can still be seen along the external western side, where the inlet was located. The interior of the cistern is divided into two aisles by three large pillars, and is entirely covered with a hydraulic mortar of excellent workmanship (cocciopesto). A small rectangular building is attached to the northern corner of the cistern.

== See also ==
Media related to Villa dei Quintili (Rome) at Wikimedia Commons

- Villa of the sette bassi

== Notes ==
Preceded by Insula dell'Ara Coeli	Landmarks of Rome; Villa of the Quintilii	Succeeded by Villa dei Sette Bassi
