= Quirinal Obelisk =

Landmark in Rome, Italy

- Obelisco del Quirinale
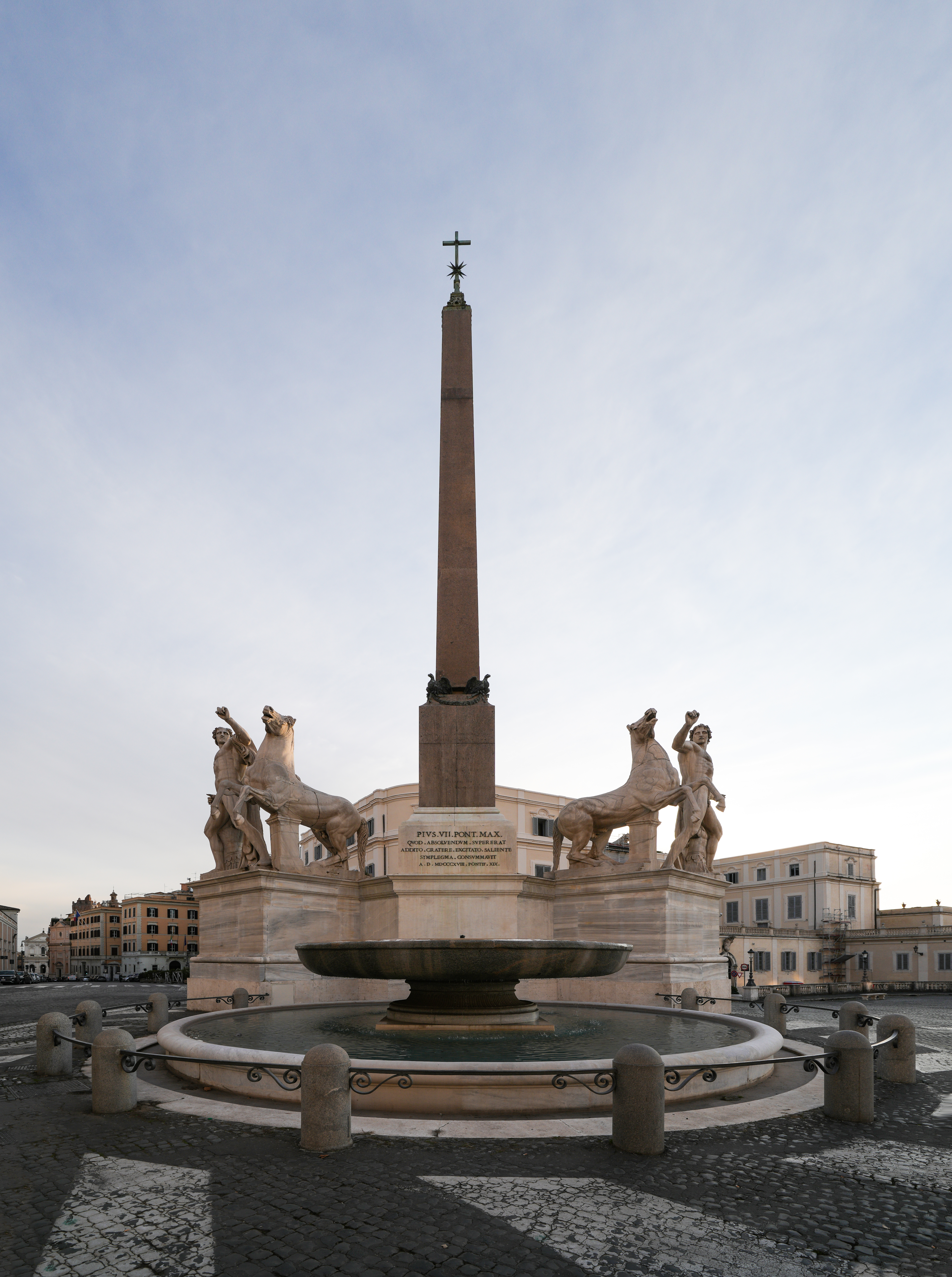
- The obelisk with the Dioscuri statues in 2007
- Interactive map of Quirinal Obelisk
- Location: Piazza del Quirinale, Quirinal Hill (Colle Quirinale), Rome, Italy
- Coordinates: 41°53′57″N 12°29′12″E
- Designer: Original designer unknown potentially commissioned under Domitian; Giovanni Antinori and Raffaello Stern
- Type: Roman‑era obelisk, red granite monolith
- Material: Red granite from Aswan, Egypt
- Height: Obelisk: 14.64 m (48.0 ft); with pedestal: 28.94 m (94.9 ft)
- Weight: Unrecorded
- Beginning date: Likely quarried in late 1st century CE
- Completion date: Re‑erected in 1786
- Dedicated date: 1786 by Pope Pius VI
- Restored date: Restored between 1782–1786 by Giovanni Antinori under Pius VI; fountain constructed by Raffaello Stern for Pius VII in 1818
- Dedicated to: Initially Caesar Augustus; presently Pius VI
- Dismantled date: Date unknown; fell and was buried in the Middle Ages
- Inscriptions: None on the obelisk itself (anepigraphic); Latin inscriptions on the pedestal

The Quirinal Obelisk (Italian: Obelisco del Quirinale) is one of the thirteen ancient obelisks of Rome. It stands in the Piazza del Quirinale on the Quirinal Hill, the highest of Rome's hills and forms the centrepiece of the Fountain of the Dioscuri (depicting Castor and Pollux). The square is dominated by the Quirinal Palace, the official residence of the President of the Italian Republic.

The obelisk is anepigraphic (without hieroglyphic inscriptions) and was probably manufactured in Egypt during the Roman period, rather than being a genuine Pharaonic monument. It is one of a pair that originally flanked the entrance to the Mausoleum of Augustus; its twin is the Esquiline Obelisk, which has been re-erected in Piazza dell'Esquilino. Both are made of red Aswan granite. The monolith of the Quirinal obelisk stands at 14.64m tall (29.94m on its base).

An interesting feature of both the Esquiline and the Quirinal obelisks is that they lack the pyramidion (the top, shaped like a pyramid) that is found on the vast majority of obelisks quarried in Egypt. It has been proposed that the reason for this curious omission is that the Romans who commissioned it did not understand the significance of the pyramidion and simply did not ask for it. The obelisks were lost, toppling at some point during the Middle Ages. They were rediscovered several times before finally being excavated and re-erected by Pius VI, and completed by Pius VII, with the addition of the current fountain in 1818.

== History ==
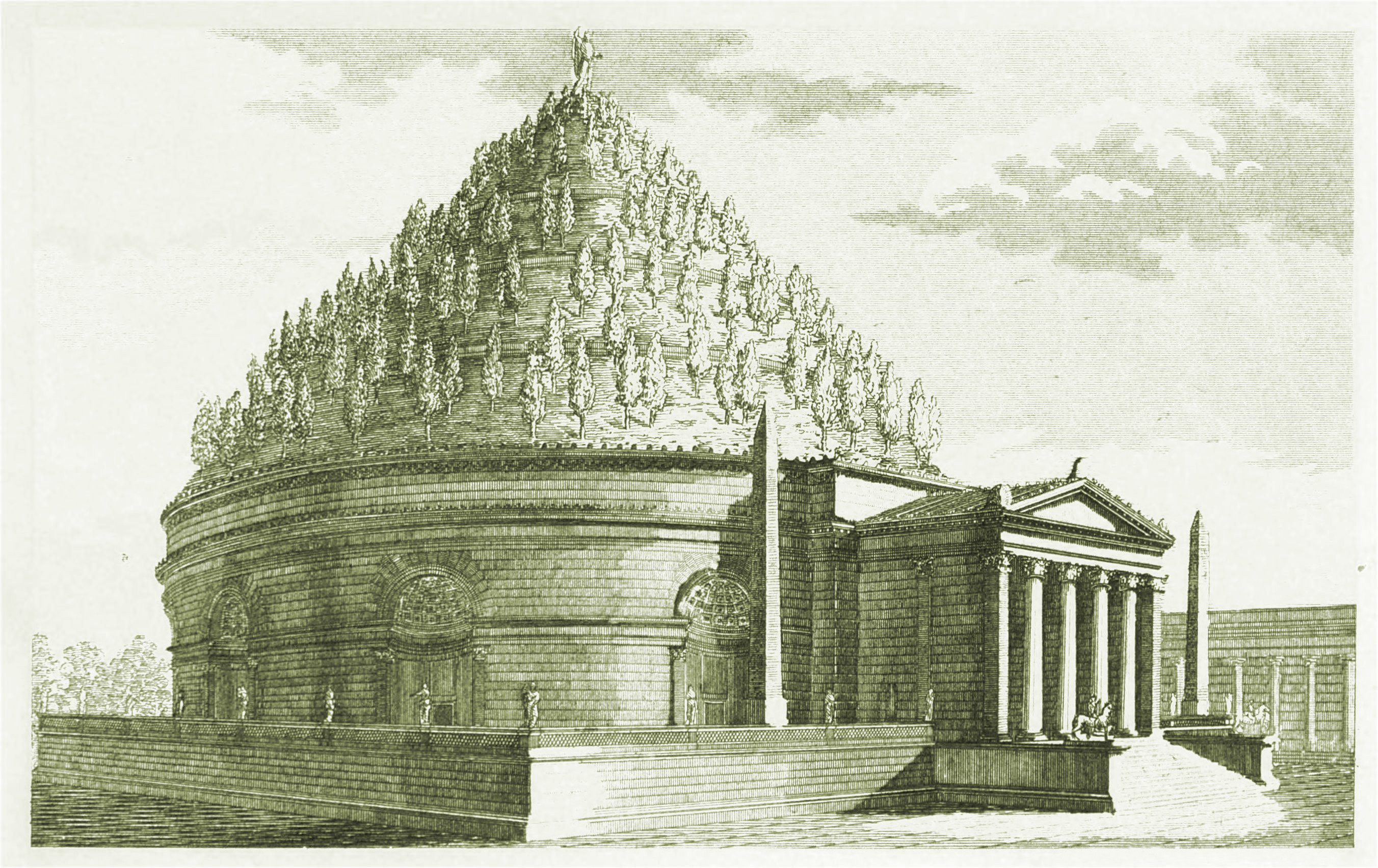
Graphic simulation of the original architecture of the Augustan (Mausoleum of Augustus) in Rome

The beginnings of the Quirinal obelisk remains somewhat mysterious. What is fairly certain is that it (and its partner, the Esquiline Obelisk) were quarried in Egypt, in Aswan, from red granite. There are a number of different theories regarding the original erection of the Quirinal Obelisk (and its partner). One, proposed by Parker (1879), suggests it was erected by Moeris (another name of Pharaoh Amenemhat III) in approximately 1994 BCE. However, this theory and others suggesting that these were commissioned by the Pharaohs, have been generally discarded by modern archeology (partly due to the complete lack of hieroglyphic inscriptions on either of the obelisks). Presently both are believed to have been commissioned by a Roman Emperor or wealthy Roman, quarried in Egypt and transported to Rome to adorn the Mausoleum of Augustus, some time in the 1st Century, probably under the Emperor Domitian.

The precise facts remain uncertain as the Mausoleum, when it was constructed and later described by Strabo, had no obelisks. However they are attested in Ammianus Marcellinus' description of the tomb in his Roman History written in the 4th Century. Thus, there is a window of several hundred years during which they may have been quarried and erected. Over the proceeding centuries the Mausoleum eventually became a tumulus, and was surmounted by a chapel, and later, fortifications by the 12th Century, and the obelisks disappear once again from the historical record.

=== Rediscovery ===
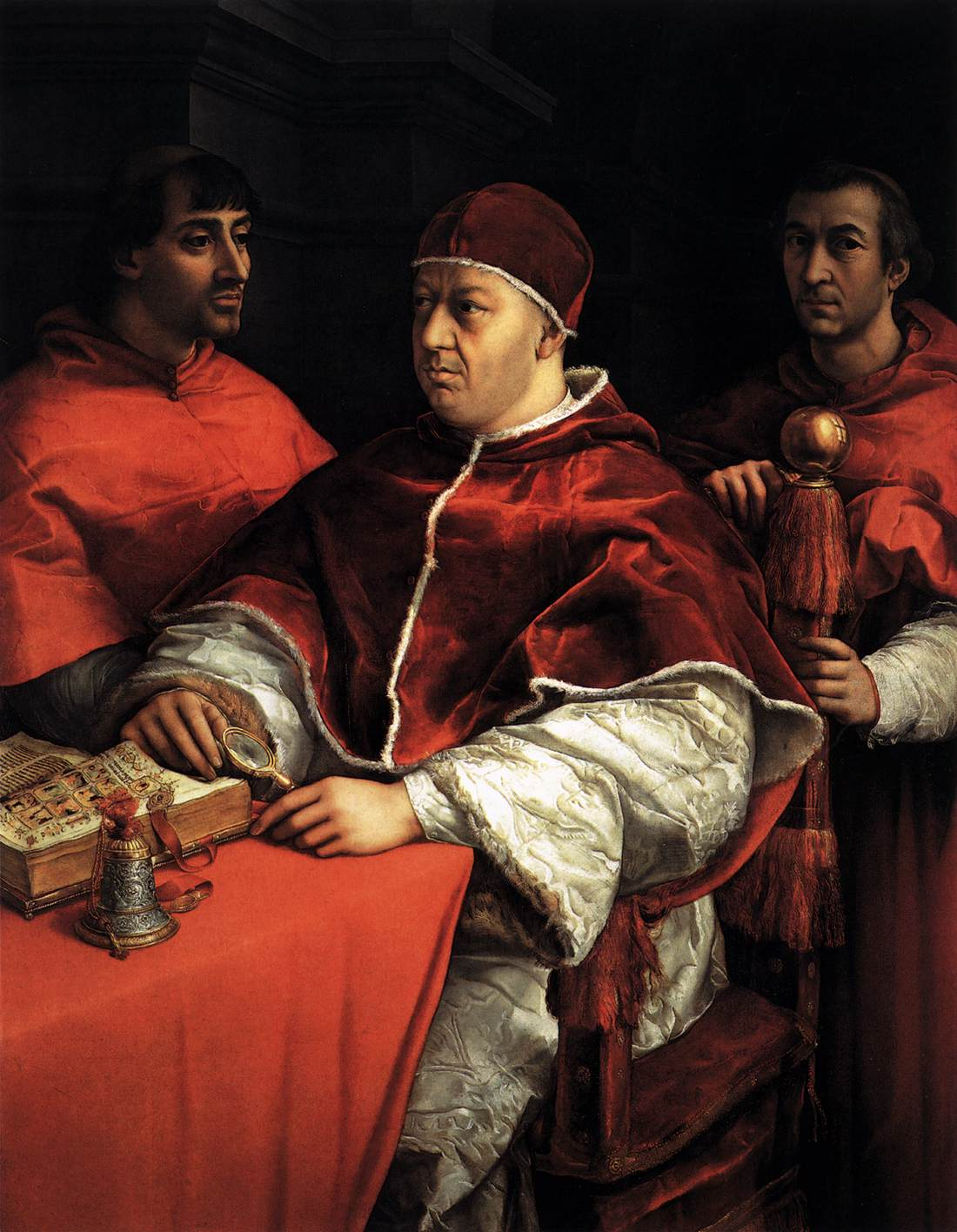
Portrait of Pope Leo X and his cousins, cardinals Giulio de' Medici and Luigi de' Rossi by Raphael, c. 1619.

The obelisk was rediscovered several times before it was finally fully excavated, restored, re-erected and dedicated in its present location.

==== First rediscovery ====
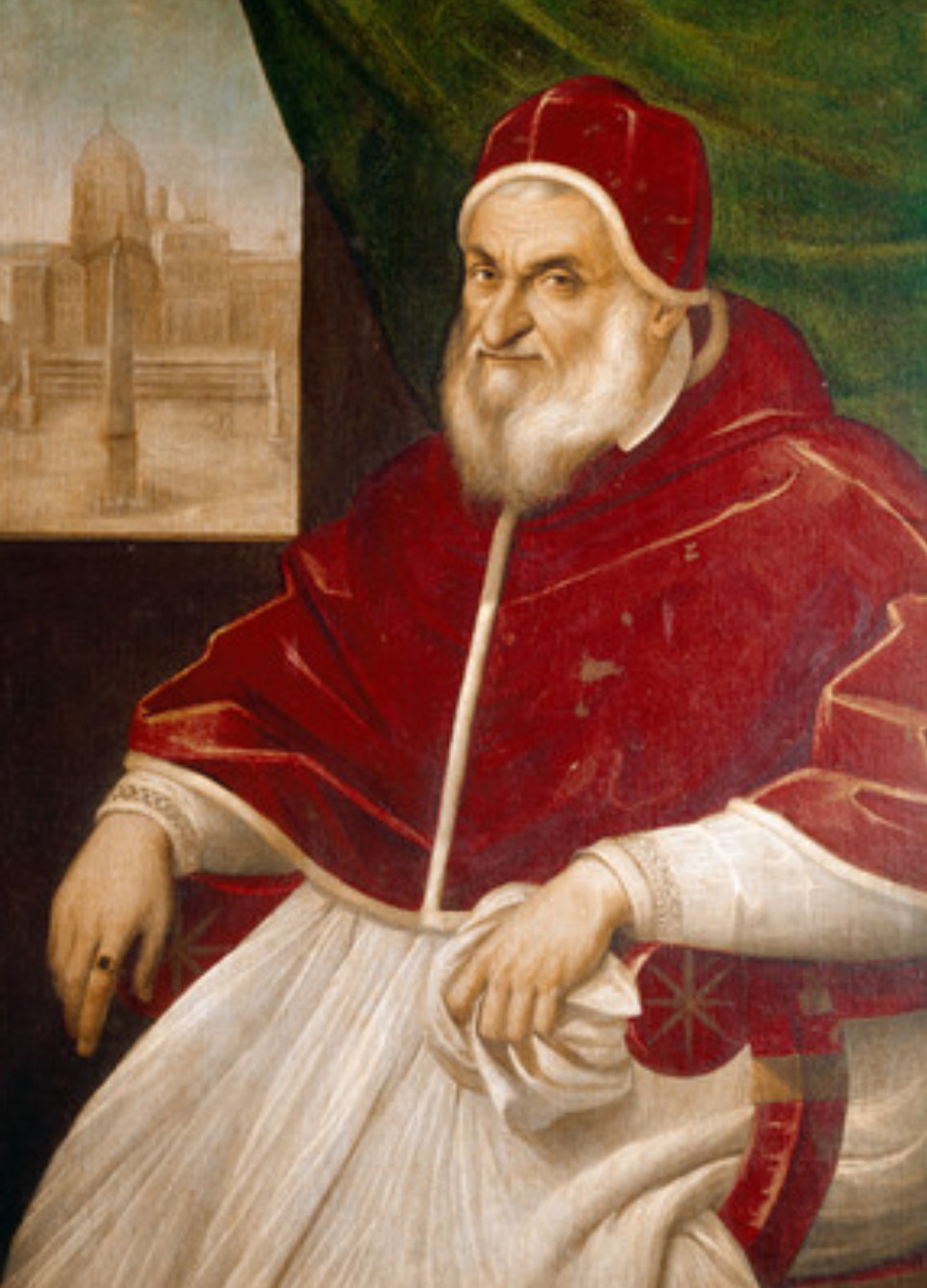
Portrait of Pope Sixtus V, overlooking a square with an obelisk, by Pietro Facchetti. Sixtus V intended to erect an obelisk before every pilgrimage church in Rome.

Both of the obelisks which had stood before Augustus' Mausoleum were first uncovered during the papacy of Leo X, circa 1520. One of the obelisks, now the Esquiline Obelisk, was removed and later restored and re-erected by Sixtus V in its present location, however the Quirinal obelisk remained in situ and was re-buried and forgotten, once again.

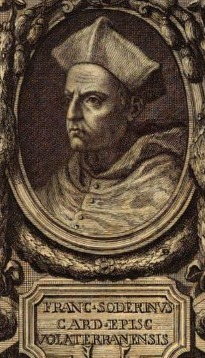
Portrait Engraving of Francesco Soderini.

==== Second rediscovery ====
It was uncovered a second time by the owner of the land it had been buried on, Monsignor Francesco Soderini. Soderini was an important figure of the Renaissance period, having been a Florentine diplomat, a Cardinal (participating in 5 papal conclaves), holding several key ecclesiastical offices, and having engaged in a plot against Pope Leo X, before going into exile, and only returning to Rome in the 1521 after Leo's death. He was given authorization to excavate the obelisk, however for unclear reasons this did not occur and it was once again re-buried and forgotten.

==== Final rediscovery ====
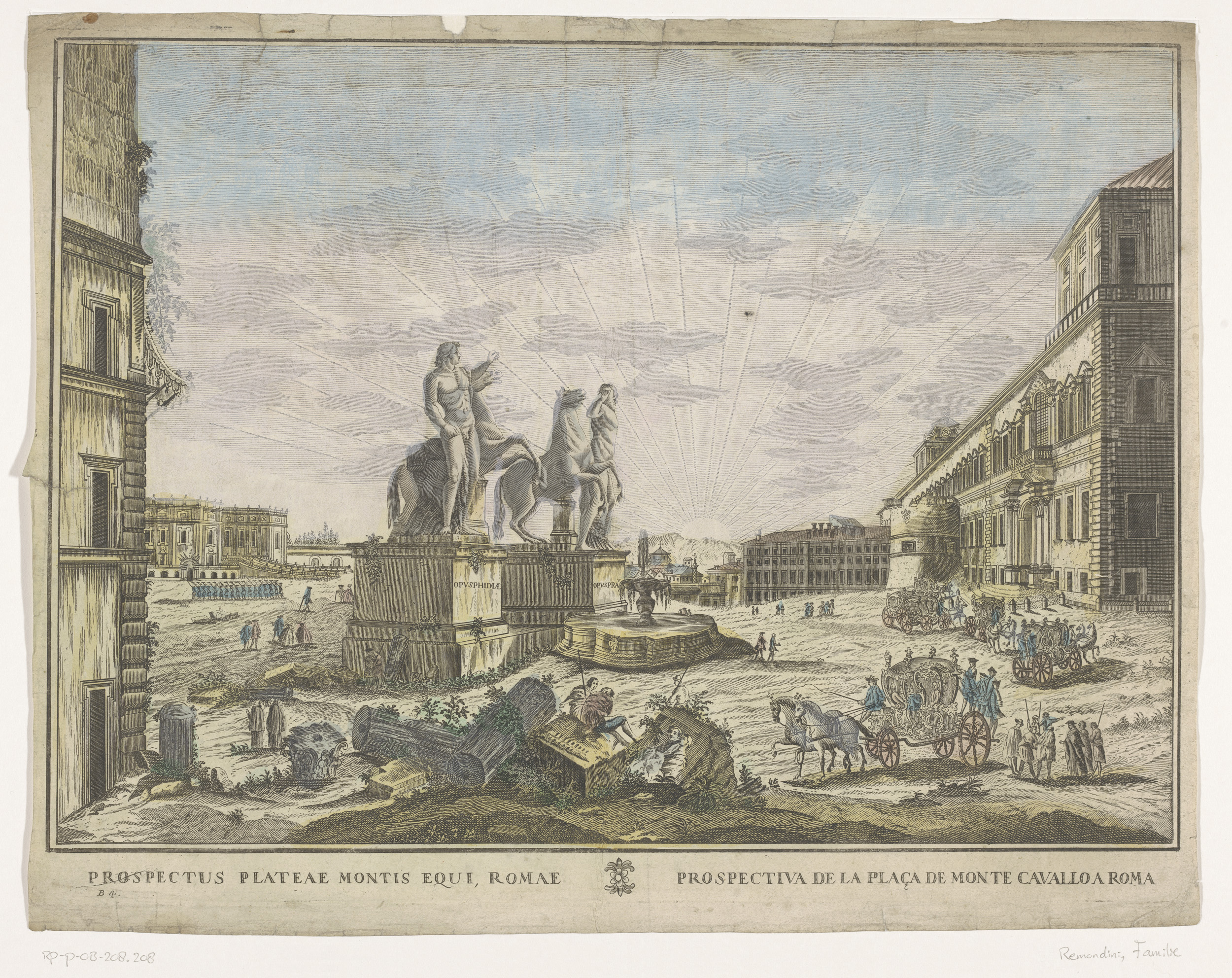
View of the Piazza del Quirinale in Rome before the re-erection of the Obelisk

The final rediscovery came by chance in 1781, during foundation work for buildings near the Hospital of San Rocco. The shaft was found broken into three pieces, and the granite base was split in two. The discovery prompted immediate interest from Pope Pius VI. Giovanni Antinori was contracted in 1782, to extract the parts of the obelisk and its base, and Pius VI determined that it should be re-erected. It is uncertain when exactly the decision was made that it should stand amongst the Statues of the Dioscuri (which had been moved to the Quirinal Hill from their previous home close to the ruins of the Baths of Constantine, by Pope Sixtus V in the 1580s), but it certainly occurred before the 20th of July of 1782, a plan which was not initially popular with the citizenry of Rome.

=== Restoration ===
Antinori presented Pius VI with three alternative designs for inserting the obelisk between the Dioscuri. The first two left the horses in place, proposing either a separate matching pedestal or a freestanding base of different dimensions. Antinori himself cautioned that these options risked creating "a certain implausible uniformity" and looking "dryly ... as if frozen." The third alternative, an option to rotate the horses and their pedestals by 45 degrees and place the obelisk on a base joined to the existing ones, was Antinori's clear favourite. He argued that this would "provide multiple points of view and form a whole that would seem born at a single moment" and place the obelisk at "the most majestic elevation and height without the violent assistance of multiple pedestals and bases piled on top of one another." On 18 December 1782, Pius VI chose the third, most expensive option.

The rotation of the colossal horse-tamer statues was a major engineering challenge. The first attempt, on 19 August 1783, failed when two ropes broke; an anonymous report blamed poor anchoring of the windlasses. With corrections in place, Antinori successfully turned the first horse on 2 September 1783 in just fifteen minutes using three windlasses and one hundred men. The second horse was turned even more quickly on 8 November 1783, in seven minutes using a single windlass and sixteen men.

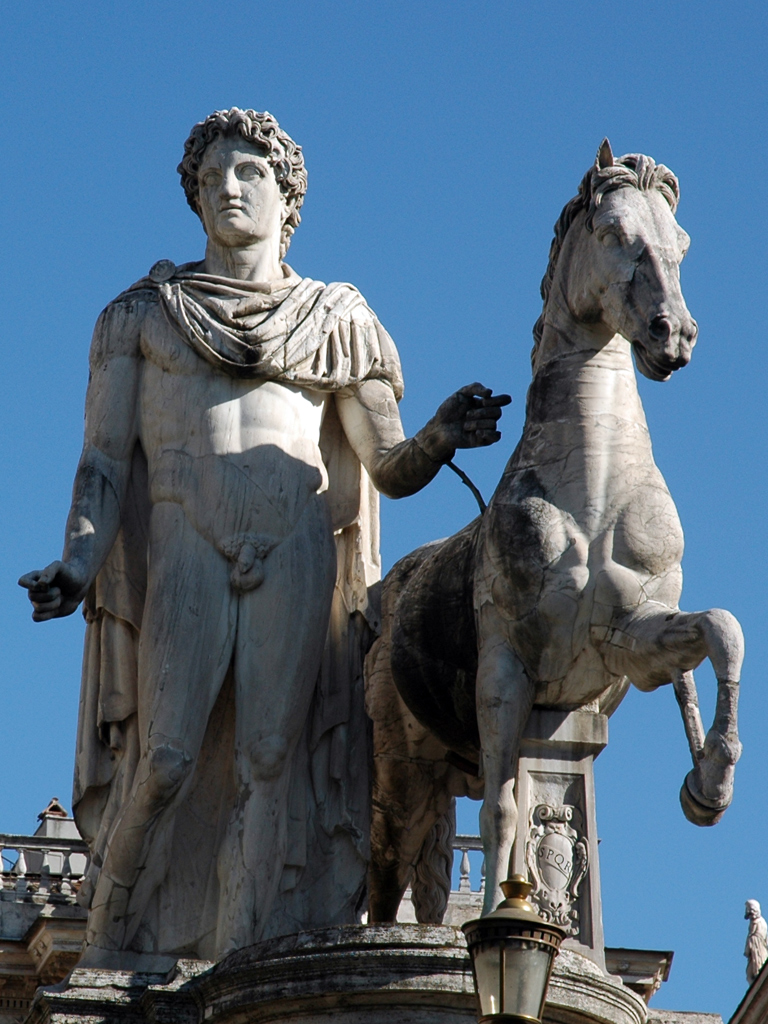
One of the two Dioscuri and their horse

Three bids were received for restoring the damaged shaft. Giovanni Pierantoni, sculptor to the papal museum, proposed an archaeological approach with full reintegration using patches, at a cost of 3,000 scudi. Antinori offered an architectural solution: sacrifice the damaged base and using the material for repairs, for 2,600 scudi. Giuseppe Giovanelli, a stonecutter, offered simply to repair the shaft for 900 scudi (or 1,400 with polishing). Pius VI chose Antinori's approach but rejected his proposal to use the base of what would become the Montecitorio obelisk instead of the broken original. In the end, Antinori built a new base by cladding a travertine core with granite slabs sawn from the damaged original as a nod to the original plan. The contract, signed on 14 January 1783, specified that the obelisk should be restored to its original height of 72 palmi (about 16 metres), but this was never achieved; the final height is only 65.5 palmi (14.64 metres), because the granite intended for extending the shaft was consumed by the new base.

==== Erection and dedication ====
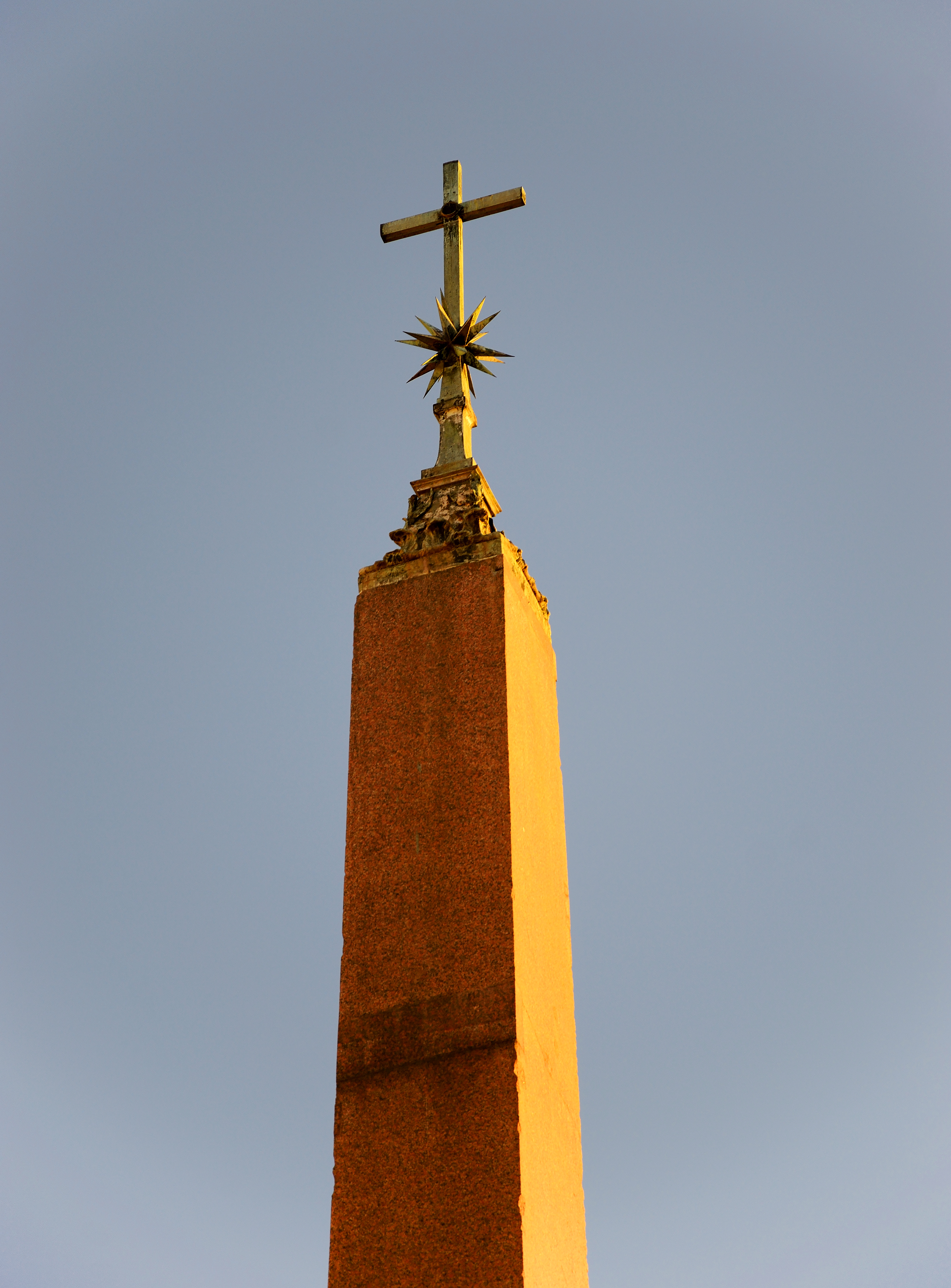
The top of the obelisk

The three repaired pieces of the obelisk were erected with great ceremony on 23 September, 30 September, and 6 October 1786. Pope Pius VI watched from a window of the Quirinal Palace. On 14 October 1786, a bronze cross was placed on top, containing relics of the True Cross, the Apostles Peter, Paul, and Andrew, and Popes Gregory the Great and Pius V.

The cross is part of a larger bronze ornamentation designed by Antinori. At the base of the obelisk, four bronze eagles with outstretched wings, connected by oak-leaf garlands, adorn the shaft. At the top, the cross rests on a spherical star composed of twenty points, and when designed and installed initially was surrounded by four Eoli (wind gods) and a group of lilies. These elements explicitly alluded to the coat of arms of Pope Pius VI (the Braschi family), which featured a wind blowing on a cluster of lilies with three stars above. Antinori defended the bronze ornaments in a memorandum to Cardinal Pallotta, arguing that the cross signalled the obelisk's "passage from a pagan dedication to that of the true God," and that the eagles and garlands helped "simulate the stone's wholeness more effectively" by distracting the viewer from the breaks in the shaft. He also noted that the eagle motif was "a true imitation of the antique," drawn from Trajan's Column, and thus corresponded with "current taste."

==== Inscriptions ====
The obelisk itself bears no hieroglyphic inscriptions (it is anepigraphic), but the pedestal carries five Latin inscriptions composed by the ex-Jesuit scholar Stefano Antonio Morcelli. A rejected set of inscriptions (see below) by Francesco Antonio Zaccaria, another ex-Jesuit, had emphasised the obelisk's Egyptian origins and its Christian purification, a traditional approach following the example of Sixtus V, who had been known to deliberately exorcise the several obelisks he had erected before several of the Pilgrimage churches during his pontificate (i.e. the Vatican, Lateran, Flaminio, and Esquiline Obelisks). Morcelli's accepted texts, by contrast, emphasised Pius VI's engineering achievement and the urban embellishment of Rome, without invoking religious purification.

The most remarkable inscription is a Latin elegy in which the obelisk speaks in the first person, originally concluding with the claim that it would testify "how much lesser Alexander was than Pius" (testabor quanto sit minor ille Pio). However, under Pius VII, the final words were altered to read merely "the great deeds of Pius" (grandia facta Pii). The original deliberately misidentified the Dioscuri as of "Alexander" (an identification already rejected by Pius's own antiquarians), was a propagandistic device to exalt Pius VI over both Alexander the Great and his predecessor Sixtus V. As Erik Iversen observed, the alteration reflected that even in papal Rome "the delicate flower of humility was timidly striking roots."

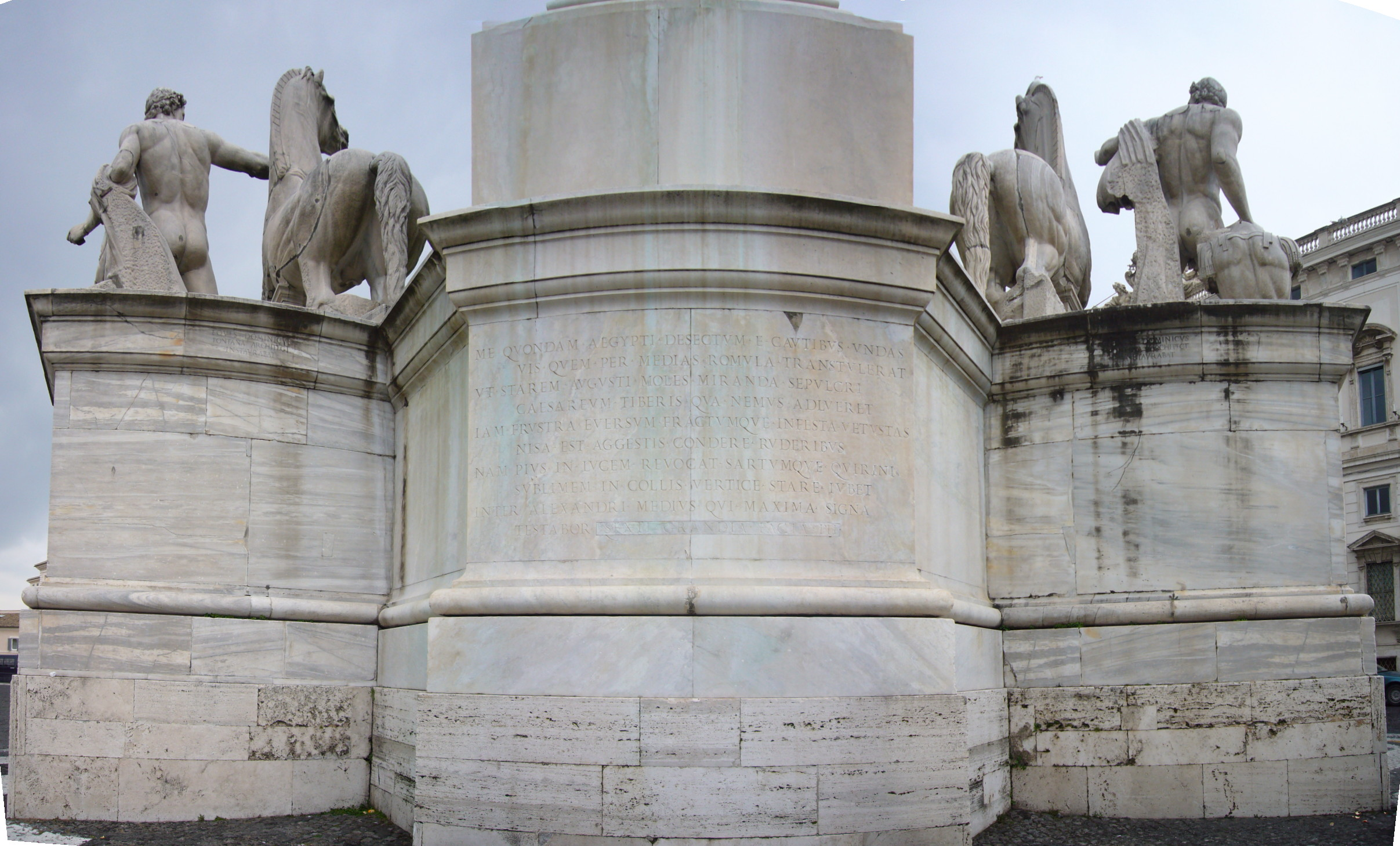
The epigram at the back of the monument, with Pius VII's modification

The foundation medals were placed in a bejewelled marble box (a cassetta) in the base of one of the horses, bearing the year 1783, Antinori's name, and the legend Non Tenuis Gloria ("not slight the glory"), a paraphrase of part of Virgil's Georgics about apiculture. The choice of Virgil's Georgics was not accidental. In the poem, bees symbolise regeneration and the restoration of the golden age under Augustus. By restoring Augustus's obelisk, Pius VI was casting himself as a new Augustus, reviving Rome's faded glory. As Jeffrey Collins observes, "just as corpses can generate bees, Braschi seems to say, dead obelisks can bring forth a new dawn." The medals themselves, according to reports of the time, bear the face of Pius VI and an inscription by Zaccaria:

Medallion Inscription and Translation
Medallion	Translation
Obeliscum; Ruinis Mausolei Augustalis a tot Saeculis obrutum Effodi, Instaurari, et ornari, Et Equis ad laxandum frontis spatium in obliquum versis Erigi Jussit; Anno MDCCLXXXIII; Pontificatus IX	He ordered the Obelisk, buried for so many centuries beneath the ruins of the Mausoleum of Augustus, to be excavated, restored, and embellished, and, with the Horses turned sideways to widen the frontal space, to be erected. In the year 1783, the ninth of his Pontificate.

Presently, it is quite challenging to read the original texts inscribed on the pedestal, so the texts below have been taken from Carlo Pietrangeli's 1942 article in Roma and compared with Forcella's reference work on Inscriptions in Rome.

Inscriptions of the Quirinal Obelisk
Location	Original	Expanded	Translation
On the front (eastern face) of both Dioscuri pedestals, facing the Rospigliosi Palace	XYSTVS·V·PONT·MAX; COLOSSAEA·HAEC·SIGNA·TEMPORIS·SVI·DEFORMATA; RESTITVIT; VETERIBVSQVE·REPOSITIS·INSCRIPTIONIBVS; E·PROXIMIS·CONSTANTINIANIS·THERMIS; IN·QVIRINALEM·AREAM·TRANSTVLIT; ANNO·SALVTIS·MDLXXXIX; PONTIFICATVS·QVARTO	Xystus V, Pontifex Maximus, colossea haec signa temporis sui deformata restituit, veteribusque repositis inscriptionibus, e proximis in Constantinianis thermis Quirinalem aream transtulit. Anno Salutis MDLXXXIX, Pontificatus quarto.	Sixtus V, Supreme Pontiff, restored these colossal statues, which had been disfigured by age, and, with the ancient inscriptions replaced, transferred them from the nearby Baths of Constantine to the Quirinal square. In the year of Salvation 1589, the fourth of his pontificate.
On the rear cornice (western face) of both Dioscuri pedestals, recording Fontana's restoration work	EQVES·DOMINICVS; FONTANA·ARCHITECT; INSTAVRABAT	Eques Dominicus; Fontana Architectus instaurabat.	Knight Domenico Fontana, Architect, restored (this).
On the front face of the plinth of the left-hand (eastern) Dioscurus statue, directly below the horse's raised hoof	OPVS·FIDIAE	Opus Phidiae	The work of Phidias
On the front face of the plinth of the right-hand (western) Dioscurus statue, directly below the horse's raised hoof	OPVS·PRAXITELIS	Opus Praxitelis	The work of Praxiteles
On the front (eastern face) of the obelisk's granite pedestal, facing Via Venti Settembre (formerly Via di Porta Pia)	PIVS·VI·PONT·MAX· SIGNIS·ET·BASIBVS; QVAE·XYSTVS·V·AEQVATA·IN·FRONTEM; CONSTITVERAT; FAVSTA·MOLITIONE; ET·OPERE·INTACTO·IN·LATERA·AVERSIS; OBELISCVM·C·CAESARIS·AVGVSTI; GEMINVM·EI·QVI·IN·EXQVILIIS·STAT; E·MAVSOLEI·RVDERIBVS·TRANSLATVM; AREAE·QVIRINALI·EXORNANDAE; INTERMEDIVM·STATVI; LACVM·ET·SALIENTES·RESTITVI·IVSSIT	Pius VI, Pontifex Maximus, signis et basibus, quae Xystus V aequata in frontem constituerat, fausta molitione et opere intacto in latera aversis, obeliscum Gaius Caesaris Augusti, geminum ei qui in Exquiliis stat, e Mausolei ruderibus translatum, areae Quirinali exornandae intermedium statui, lacum et salientes restitui iussit.	Pope Pius VI, after turning to their sides successfully and unharmed the statues and bases that Sixtus V had arranged to be even in the front, ordered that the obelisk of Gaius Caesar Augustus whose twin stands on the Esquiline, having been moved from the mausoleum, [be re-erected] to adorn the Piazza del Quirinale and that the basin and jets between the statues be restored. Alternate translation: Pope Pius VI, Pontifex Maximus, having turned to the sides, with a favourable operation and with the work unharmed, the statues and bases which Sixtus V had arranged to be evenly placed in the front, ordered that the obelisk of Gaius Caesar Augustus, the twin of the one which stands on the Esquiline, transported from the ruins of the Mausoleum to adorn the Quirinal square, [and] placed between the statues, [and] that the basin and the jets [of water] be restored.
On the northern face of the obelisk's granite pedestal	XX·KAL·OCT; ANNO; M·DCC·LXXXVI	Ante diem XX Kalendas Octobres; Anno; MDCCLXXXVI.	20th day before the Kalends of October in the year 1786 Alternate translation: 12 September 1786
On the southern face of the obelisk's granite pedestal	ANNO·XII; SACRI·PRINCIPATVS; EIVS IOANNE·ANTINORIO·CAMERIE·ARCHIT·	Anno XII sacri principatus eius. Ioanne Antinorio Camerii architecto.	In the twelfth year of his sacred pontificate, with Giovanni Antinori of Camerino as architect.
On the rear (western face) of the obelisk's granite pedestal, facing Via XXIV Maggio	SALVE; OPTIME·PRINCEPS; SALVE; PARENS·POPVLI·ROMANI; VOTISQVE·VIVE·NOSTRIS; VIVE·VRBI·TVAE; VIVE; ORBI·CHRISTIANO; CVI·TE·DEVS; MAXIMVM·RECTOREM; DEDIT	Salve, optime princeps, salve, parens populi Romani, votisque vive nostris, vive urbi tuae, vive orbi Christiano, cui te Deus maximum rectorem dedit.	Hail, best prince, hail father of the Roman people, may you live through our prayers, may you live for your city, and live for the Christian world to whom God gave you as the greatest ruler.
On the western face of the marble pedestal above the granite base, facing the Rospigliosi Palace	ME·QVONDAM·VT·AEGYPTI·DESECTVM·E·CAVTIBVS·VNDAS; VIS·QVEM·PER·MEDIAS·ROMVLA·TRANSTVLERAT; VT·STAREM·AVGVSTI·MOLES·MIRANDA·SEPVLCRI; CAESAREVM·TIBERIS·QVA·NEMVS·ADLVERET; IAM·FRVSTRA·EVERSVM·FRACTVMQVE·INFESTA·VETVSTAS; NISA·AGGESTIS·CONDERE·RVDERIBVS; NAM·PIVS·IN·LVCEM·REVOCAT·SARTVM·QVIRINI; SVBLIMEM·IN·COLLIS·VERTICE·STARE·IVBET; INTER·ALEXANDRI·MEDIVS·QVI·MAXIMA·SIGNA; TESTABOR·SEXTI·GRANDIA·FACTA·PII The final couplet read, originally: INTER·ALEXANDRI·MEDIVS·QVI·MAXIMA·SIGNA; TESTABOR·QVANTO·SIT·MINOR·ILLE·PIO	Me quondam Aegypti desectum e cautibus, undas vis quem per medias Romula transtulerat, ut starem Augusti moles miranda sepulcri, Caesareum Tiberis qua nemus adlueret; Iam frusta eversum fractumque infesta vetustas nisa est aggestis condere ruderibus. Nam Pius in lucem revocat, sartumque Quirini sublimem in collis vertice stare iubet, inter Alexandri medius qui maxima signa; testabor quanto sit minor ille Pio. The final couplet read: "inter Alexandri medius qui maxima signa; testabor Sexti grandia facta Pii.	I, once carved from the cliffs of Egypt and carried by Romulean force over the waves to stand as a wondrous monument of the tomb of Augustus, where the Tiber washes the grove of the Caesars, I, whom age vainly tried to bury in mounded ruins when I was overturned and broken, I am called back to the light by Pius, who bids me to stand, repaired, high on the summit of the Quirinal Hill between the greatest images of Alexander, and I will testify to the great deeds of Pius the Sixth. Originally:...between the greatest images of Alexander, where I will testify how much lesser Alexander was than Pius.
On the plinth behind the fountain, facing Via XXIV Maggio	PIVS·VII·PONT·MAX; QVOD·ABSOLVENDVM·SVPERERAT; ADDITO·GRATERE·EXCITATO·SALIENTE; SYMPLEGMA·CONSVMMAVIT; A.D.MDCCCXVIII·PONTIF·XIX	Pius VII, Pontifex Maximus, quod absolvendum supererat, addito cratere, excitato saliente, symplegma consummavit. Anno Domini MDCCCXVIII, Pontificatus XIX.	Pius VII, Supreme Pontiff, completed the entire ensemble with the addition of the basin and the activation of the jet of water, finishing what remained to be done. In the year of our Lord 1818, the nineteenth of his pontificate.

===== Rejected inscriptions =====
The rejected set of inscriptions, composed by the ex-Jesuit Francesco Antonio Zaccaria, survives in the archival records but was never used. They follow the traditional Sistine approach, emphasising the obelisk's Egyptian origins and its Christian purification, in contrast to Morcelli's accepted texts which emphasised Pius VI's engineering achievement.

Rejected Inscriptions (Zaccaria)
Location	As Proposed	Expanded	Translation
Main Panel (proposed for the front)	PIVS·VI·PONT·MAX OBELISCVM·GEMINVM·ALTERI; QVEM·SIXTVS·V·AD·TEMPLVM·LIBERIAN·STATVIT; PROLAPSIONIBVS·MAVSOLEI·AVGVSTALIS; VBI·A·CLAVDIO·IMP·VTERQVE·POSITVS; CONSEPVLTVM·DVCENTIS·FERE·POST·ANNIS; EX·QVO·DETECTVS·FVERAT·ERVI; A·VETVSTATE·DIFFRACTVM·ELEGANTER·RESTITVI; EQVISQVE·VT·AREA·ESSET·MONVMENTO; ET·SALIENTI·INTERIECTO·FONTI * IN·OBLIQVVUM·EX·ARTE·CONVERSIS; ERIGI·IVSSIT; A·M·DCC·LXXXIII·PONT·IX An Alternate was also proposed, if the fountain was not to be mentioned: AMPLIOR·ET·SPECTATV·VENVSTIOR	Pius VI, Pontifex Maximus, obeliscum geminum alteri, quem Sixtus V ad templum Liberianum statuit, prolapsionibus mausolei Augustalis, ubi a Claudio Imperatore uterque positus, consepultum ducentis fere post annis, ex quo detectus fuerat, erui, a vetustate diffractum, eleganter restitui, equisque, ut area esset monumento et salienti interiecto fonti, in obliquum ex arte conversis, erigi iussit. Anno MDCCLXXXIII, Pontificatus IX. Alternate: Amplior et spectatu venustior.	Pope Pius VI, Pontifex Maximus, ordered that the obelisk, the twin of the other which Sixtus V placed at the Liberian Temple (Santa Maria Maggiore), buried in the ruins of the Augustan Mausoleum where both had been placed by the Emperor Claudius, and lying hidden for nearly two hundred years after it was first discovered, be excavated; that it be elegantly restored from the damage of age; and that it be erected after the horses had been skilfully turned into an oblique position so that there would be space for the monument and for the intervening fountain with its jets. In the year 1783, the ninth of his pontificate. Alternate:...position, more ample, and more pleasing to behold.
Rear Panel	PIVS·VI·P·M; OBELISCVM·AEGYPTIVM; ETHNICIS·RITIBVS·POLVTVM; CHRISTIANIS·EXPIARI·IVSSIT; ET·CRVCI·SALVTIFERAE; D·D	Pius VI, Pontifex Maximus, obeliscum Aegyptium, ethnicis ritibus pollutum, Christianis expiari iussit, et Cruci salutiferae dedit, dicavit.	Pope Pius VI, Pontifex Maximus, ordered that the Egyptian obelisk, polluted by pagan rites, be expiated with Christian rites, and dedicated it to the life-giving Cross.
Side Facing the Street	AD·VETVS·ORNAMENTVM; SACRAE·VRBI; REDDENDVM	Ad vetus ornamentum sacrae Urbi reddendum.	To restore an ancient ornament to the sacred City.
Side Facing the Quirinal Palace	ET·AD·AVGENDAM; AEDIVM·PONTIFICIARVM; MAIESTATEM	Et ad augendam aedium pontificiarum maiestatem.	And to increase the majesty of the pontifical palace.

=== The Fountain of the Dioscuri and the Napoleonic Occupation ===
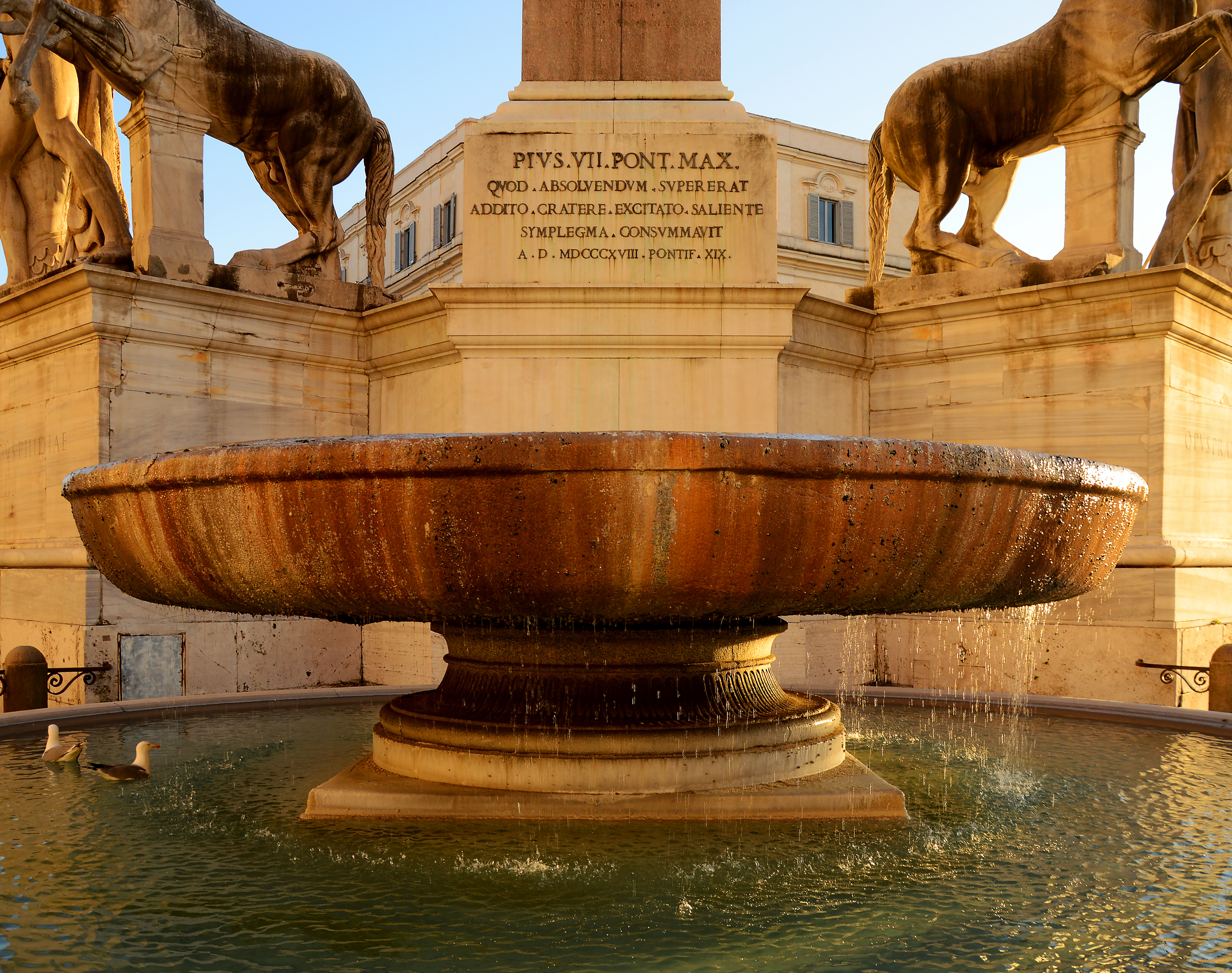
The Quirinal Fountain today

The fountain that now accompanies the obelisk was not part of the original 1786 project. Antinori had designed an elaborate Baroque fountain, but it was never completed under Pius VI. In 1818, Pope Pius VII finally added a fountain using a simple granite basin that Giacomo della Porta had originally placed in the Roman Forum (Campo Vaccino) at the end of the 16th century. This sober, neoclassical addition replaced Antinori's Baroque vision and fundamentally altered the character of the monument. Work on the fountain had been interrupted by the Napoleonic occupation and was resumed in 1816, with the basin unearthed and restored by Carlo Fea in 1818. The Occupation by Napoleonic forces had also seen damage to Antinori's design of the obelisk. The French forces, wishing to obliterate references to the Papacy and secularise the monument, defaced the obelisk of its heraldic ornamentation (i.e. the cross, spherical star, lilies, and Eoli). They also attempted to affix a new celebratory inscription to the monument's base, drilling small holes into the granite for attaching metal letters. However, the new inscription was either never completed or was stripped shortly afterwards, and no record of its text has survived. After the occupation, the cross and spherical star were restored, but the lilies and Eoli were not, leaving the finial comparatively bare.

== Reception and legacy ==
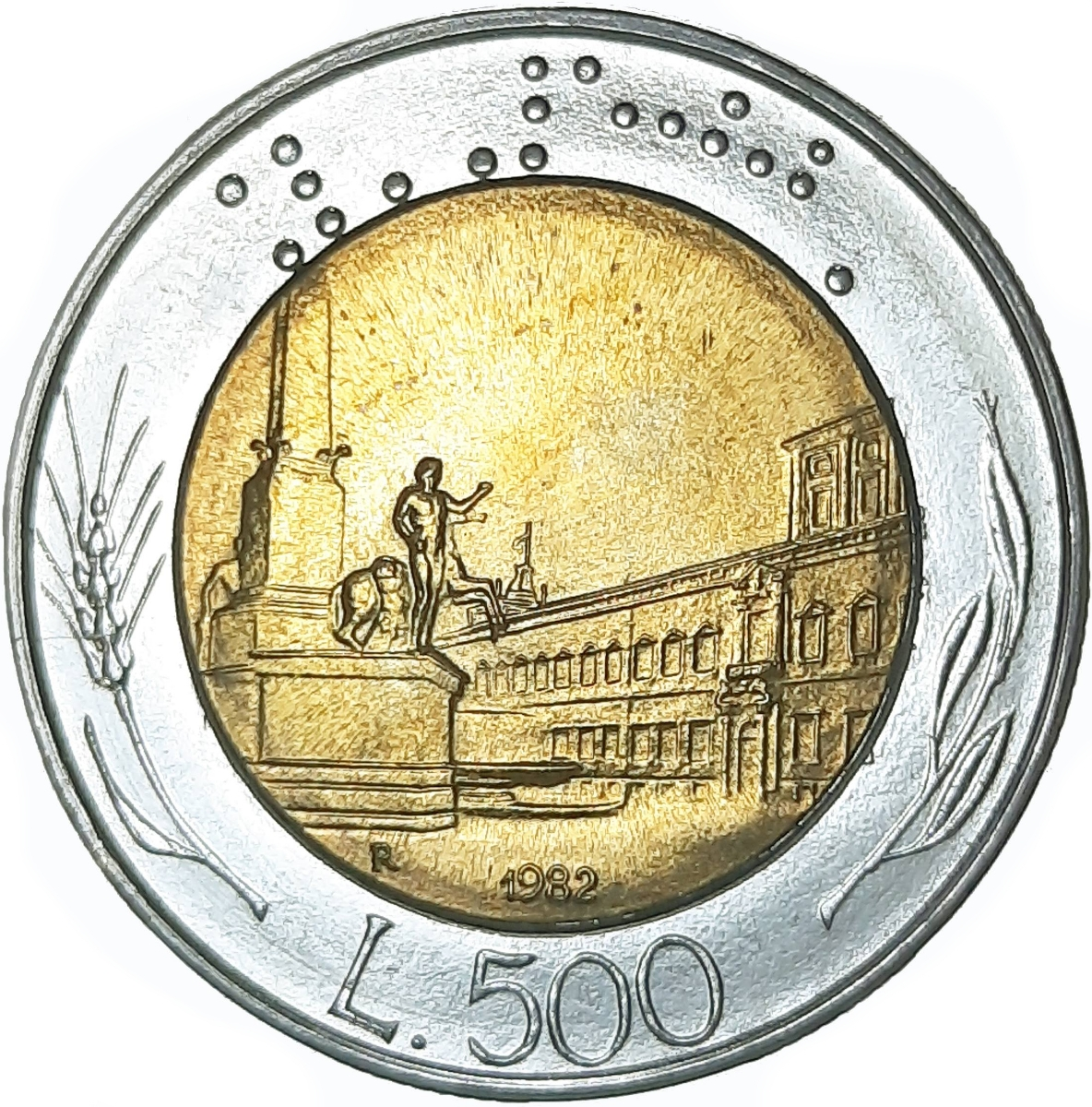
A pre-Euro Italian 500 Lira coin minted in 1982 featuring the Quirinal Obelisk and Palace

The Quirinal Obelisk has become one of the most recognisable landmarks of Rome. The monument was not universally admired in its own time; the Neapolitan rationalist Francesco Milizia criticised it for its visual complexity, arguing that "such simple masses require a plain and simple base." Despite this, the obelisk was praised by contemporaries such as the Arcadian poet "Nautilo Lemnio" (Tommaso Maria Gabrini), who described the Quirinal complex as "a surprising grouping of marvellous antiquities."

The Swiss art historian Heinrich Wölfflin later took the Quirinal monument as an archetype of Baroque style, noting that the horses "subtend an obtuse angle" and that "everything is done to prevent frontality from making itself felt, and the picture from settling."

The obelisk was featured on the Italian 500-lire coin from 1982 until the introduction of the euro in 2001. The coin depicted the obelisk with the Quirinal Palace in the background.

== See also ==
- List of obelisks in Rome
- Fontana dei Dioscuri
- Quirinal Hill
- Quirinal Palace
- Piazza del Quirinale
- Esquiline Obelisk
- Obelisk of Montecitorio
- Lateran Obelisk
- Vatican Obelisk
- Flaminio Obelisk
