= List of obelisks in Rome =

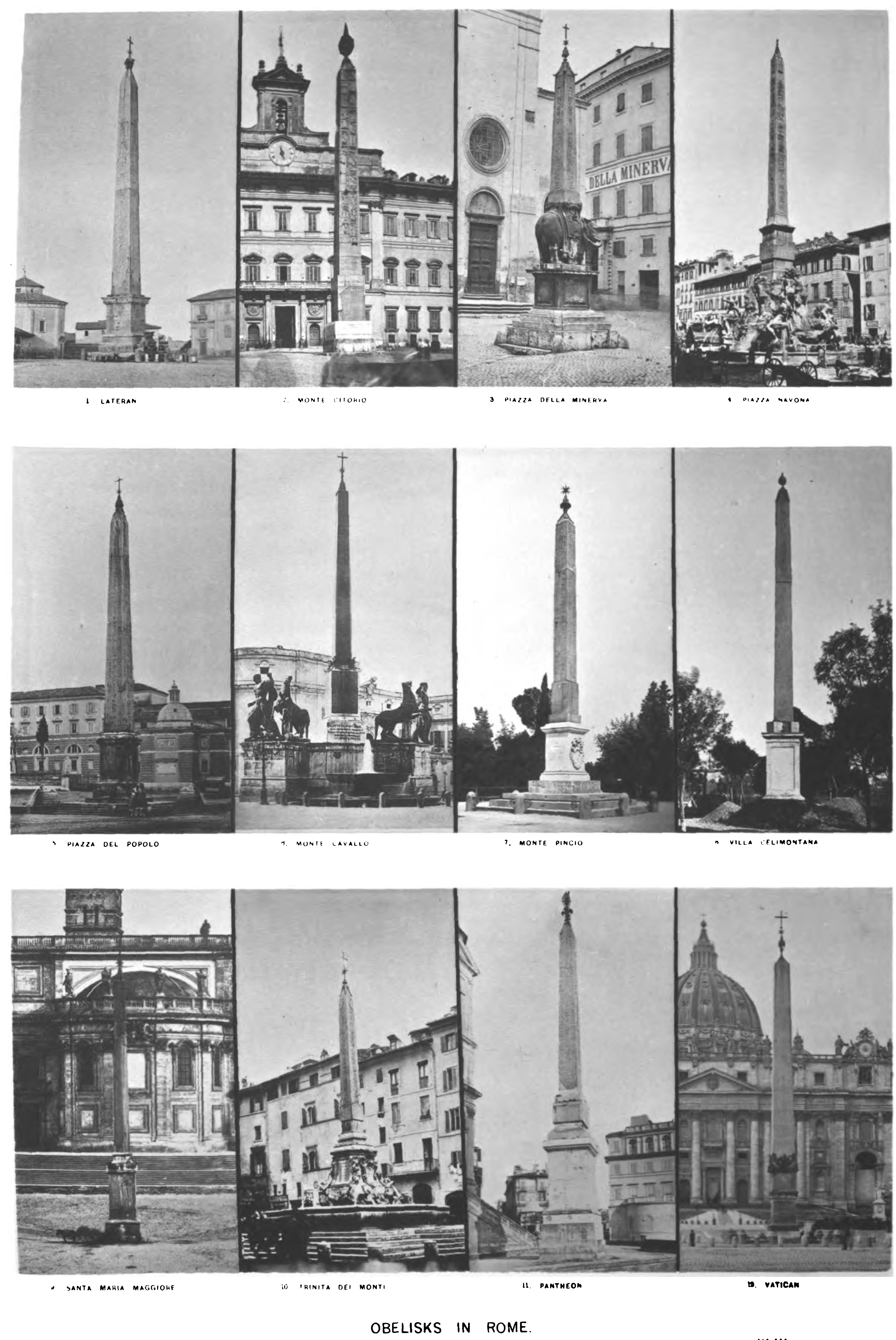
19th century collage of the twelve obelisks in Rome at the time (the Dogali obelisk was found later). Note the photos of 10 and 11 are incorrectly swapped.

The city of Rome harbours thirteen ancient obelisks, the most in the world. There are eight ancient Egyptian and five ancient Roman obelisks in Rome, together with a number of more modern obelisks (more than 30), most notably that which was dedicated to Marconi, and one dedicated to Mussolini. There was also an ancient Ethiopian obelisk in Rome, which was taken by Italy in the 1930s but was restored, and repatriated to Ethiopia in the early 2000s. The Egyptian obelisks were ordered to be brought to the city by Roman Emperors in antiquity.

It is unknown exactly how many obelisks once stood in Ancient Rome as there were no inventories made of them before the fall of Rome. What is known is that many were brought to Rome (either taken from temples by various emperors, or commissioned and quarried in Egypt by wealthy Romans) for public or private purposes. The Romans used special heavy cargo carriers called obelisk ships to transport the monuments they took from Egyptian temples down the Nile to Alexandria and from there across the Mediterranean Sea to Rome. On site, large Roman cranes were employed to erect the monoliths. According to a traditional estimate, as many as 48 obelisks may have once stood in Rome, though this number is not attested in any single ancient source and is likely a modern guess.

== Ancient Egyptian obelisks ==
Eight obelisks created in antiquity by the Egyptians were brought to Rome by Roman emperors, either as spoils of conquest or as commissioned works.

Ancient Egyptian obelisks in Rome
Name	Original Commissioner	Location	Height (total / shaft)	Description	Image
Lateranense	Tuthmosis III / Tuthmosis IV	Piazza di San Giovanni in Laterano 41°53′12.6″N 12°30′17.2″E	45.70 m 32.18 m	Originally from the Temple of Amun at Karnak. Brought to Rome in 357 AD by Constantius II. Rediscovered in 1587 and re-erected by Pope Sixtus V in 1588. Tallest obelisk in Rome and the largest standing ancient Egyptian obelisk in the world. (Note: Originally weighed around 455 tons; the current version weighs around 330 tons after being restored approximately 4 m shorter. It was erected in the place of the equestrian statue of Marcus Aurelius, which was moved to the Capitoline Hill.)	
Vaticano	Unknown	St. Peter's Square 41°54′8.1″N 12°27′26.1″E	41 m 25.5 m	Originally erected in Alexandria by Augustus. Brought to Rome by Caligula in 40 AD for the Vatican Circus. Re-erected by Pope Sixtus V in 1586. The only obelisk in Rome that has never toppled since Roman times. (Note: No hieroglyphs. During the Middle Ages, the gilt ball on top was believed to contain the ashes of Julius Caesar. When removed by Domenico Fontana, it was found to contain only dust. The obelisk is supported on bronze lions and surmounted by the Chigi arms in bronze.)	
Flaminio	Seti I / Ramses II	Piazza del Popolo 41°54′38.6″N 12°28′34.8″E	36.50 m 24 m	Originally from Heliopolis. Brought to Rome by Augustus in 10 BC. Rediscovered in 1587 and re-erected by Pope Sixtus V in 1589. (Note: Erected on the spina of the Circus Maximus. Found in two pieces with the Lateranense obelisk. Sculptures with lion fountains were added to the base in 1818. Weighs around 235 tons.)	
Solare	Psammetichus II	Piazza di Montecitorio 41°54′2.5″N 12°28′43.2″E	33.97 m 21.79 m	Originally from Heliopolis. Brought to Rome by Augustus in 10 BC to form the gnomon of the Solarium Augusti. Re-erected by Pope Pius VI in 1792. (Note: Found in the 16th century but reburied. Rediscovered and erected in front of the Palazzo Montecitorio.)	
Macuteo	Ramses II	Piazza della Rotonda 41°53′57.6″N 12°28′36.3″E	14.52 m 6.34 m	Originally from Heliopolis. Brought to Rome in antiquity. Re-erected by Pope Clement XI in 1711 in front of the Pantheon. (Note: Originally one of a pair at the Temple of Ra in Heliopolis, the other being the now much shorter Matteiano. Moved to the Temple of Isis near Santa Maria sopra Minerva. Found in 1373 near San Macuto. Erected over a fountain by Filippo Barigioni.)	
Minerveo	Apries	Piazza della Minerva 41°53′52.7″N 12°28′39.2″E	12.69 m 5.47 m	Originally from Sais. Brought to Rome by Diocletian. Re-erected by Pope Alexander VII in 1667 on Bernini's elephant base. Smallest obelisk in Rome (shaft). (Note: Originally one of a pair from Sais; the other of the pair is in Urbino. Found in 1655. Erected behind the Pantheon in Piazza della Minerva.)	
Dogali	Ramses II	Baths of Diocletian 41°54′7.8″N 12°29′50.9″E	6.34 m ?	Originally from Heliopolis. Brought to Rome in antiquity. Rediscovered in 1883 and erected as a monument to the Battle of Dogali. (Note: Originally one of a pair from Heliopolis, the other now in the Boboli Gardens in Florence. Moved to the Temple of Isis in Rome. Found by Rodolfo Lanciani near Santa Maria sopra Minerva. Originally erected in front of Termini Station and moved to its present site in 1924. Base height unknown.)	
Matteiano	Ramses II	Villa Celimontana 41°53′0.2″N 12°29′43.2″E	12.23 m 2.68 m	Originally from Heliopolis. Brought to Rome in antiquity. Fragments rediscovered and re-erected in 1820. Smallest obelisk in Rome (shaft). (Note: Originally one of a pair at the Temple of Ra in Heliopolis, the other being the Macuteo which retains much more of its original height. Moved to the Temple of Isis near Santa Maria sopra Minerva. Found in the 14th century and erected east of Santa Maria in Aracoeli on the Capitoline. Moved to Villa Celimontana after Michelangelo redesigned the square in the late 16th century. Lost again; fragments rediscovered and re-erected in 1820.)	

== Ancient Roman obelisks ==
Five obelisks were manufactured in Egypt in the Roman period at the request of wealthy Romans, or made in Rome as copies of ancient Egyptian originals.

Ancient Roman obelisks in Rome
Name	Commissioner	Location	Height (total / shaft)	Description	Image
Agonalis (Pamphilius)	Domitian (c. 81–96 AD)	Piazza Navona 41°53′56.3″N 12°28′23.1″E	30+ m 16.53 m	A copy erected at the Temple of Serapis. Moved to the Circus of Maxentius by Maxentius. Re-erected on top of the Fontana dei Quattro Fiumi by Bernini in 1651. (Note: The Earl of Arundel paid a deposit and attempted to ship the four pieces to London in the late 1630s, but Urban VIII disallowed its export.)	
Quirinale	Augustus (c. 10 BC)	Piazza del Quirinale 41°53′56.7″N 12°29′11.9″E	28.94 m 14.63 m	Originally erected on the eastern flank of the Mausoleum of Augustus, paired with the Esquiline obelisk. Found in 1527. Erected by Pope Pius VI in 1786 on the Quirinal Hill. (Note: Erected next to statues of the Dioscuri (called the 'Horse Tamers') from the Baths of Constantine.)	
Esquiline	Augustus (c. 10 BC)	Piazza dell'Esquilino 41°53′53.4″N 12°29′51″E	25.53 m 14.75 m	Originally erected on the western flank of the Mausoleum of Augustus, paired with the Quirinale obelisk. Found in 1527 and erected in 1587 by Pope Sixtus V behind Santa Maria Maggiore. (Note: One of a pair with the Quirinale obelisk.)	
Sallustiano	Aurelian (c. 270–275 AD)	Trinità dei Monti 41°54′22.1″N 12°28′59.6″E	30.45 m 13.91 m	An Aurelian copy of the Flaminio obelisk, made for the Gardens of Sallust. Found by the Ludovisi and erected in 1789 by Pope Pius VI above the Spanish Steps. (Note: Although smaller than the Flaminio obelisk of Ramses II in the Piazza del Popolo. Moved to the Piazza di San Giovanni in Laterano in 1734, but kept horizontal until 1789.)	
Pinciano	Hadrian (c. 130 AD)	Pincian Hill 41°54′38.9″N 12°28′47.1″E	17.26 m 9.24 m	Commissioned for the tomb of Antinous in Tivoli. Moved to Rome by Elagabalus for the Circus Varianus. Finally erected on the Pincian by Pope Pius VII in 1822. (Note: Found in the 16th century near the Porta Maggiore. Moved to the Palazzo Barberini, then moved to the Vatican by Pope Clement XIV.)	

== Obelisks which previously stood in Rome ==
A number of obelisks were erected in Rome over the course of its long history. The following table lists the known obelisks (and one stele) which have been re-erected elsewhere.

Obelisks that once stood in Rome and are now located elsewhere
Name	Commissioner	Location	Height (shaft)	Description	Image
Urbino	Wahibre (Apries) (6th century BC)	Via Aurelio Saffi, Urbino 43°43′27.4″N 12°38′12.9″E	~3 m	Originally erected at Sais. Transported to Rome and erected at the Iseum Campense. Moved to Urbino in 1737. Stands on a small street beside the Palazzo Ducale. (Note: The present obelisk is made up of fragments of two identical obelisks and some of a third. Moved to Urbino to celebrate Pope Clement XI.)	
Boboli (Mediceo)	Ramesses II (13th century BC)	Boboli Gardens, Florence 43°45′45.7″N 11°14′53.4″E	~6 m	Originally erected in Heliopolis. Moved to Rome by Domitian and placed in the Iseum Campense. Moved to Florence in 1788 and erected in the Boboli Gardens in 1790. (Note: Purchased by Cardinal Ferdinando I de' Medici in the 16th century and placed in the gardens of the Villa Medici. Moved to Florence by Grand Duke Peter Leopold of Lorraine. Surmounted by a gilded orb.)	
Munich	Titus Sextius Africanus (c. 98–117 AD)	State Museum of Egyptian Art, Munich 48°08′49.9″N 11°33′56.9″E	Unknown	Bears an inscription naming the Roman official Titus Sextius Africanus. Its original location in Rome is uncertain, but it is believed to have stood at the Iseum Campense. Acquired by the Bavarian Crown Prince in 1815. (Note: Later part of Cardinal Albani's collection, stolen by Napoleon and taken to Paris. Acquired by the future King Ludwig I of Bavaria.)	
Axum (Rome Stele)	Unknown (Kingdom of Aksum, c. 4th century AD)	Axum, Ethiopia 14°07′56.8″N 38°43′15.1″E	24 m	A 1,700-year-old phonolite stele from the ancient Kingdom of Aksum. Transported to Rome in 1937 and erected in Piazza di Porta Capena. Repatriated to Ethiopia in 2005 and re-erected in 2008. (Note: Collapsed and broke in antiquity. Found by Italian soldiers in 1935 and transported to Rome during the Italian occupation of Ethiopia. Struck by lightning in May 2002 before restoration.)	

== Modern obelisks ==
Modern Rome has continued the tradition of erecting obelisks. The following are some of the many obelisks which stand in the modern city:

Modern obelisks in Rome
Name	Commissioner	Location	Height (shaft)	Description	Image
Villa Medici obelisk	Balthus (1972)	Gardens of Villa Medici, Pincian Hill 41°54′30.5″N 12°28′57.3″E	6.1 m	A 20th‑century cast in marble and epoxy resin, replacing the ancient Egyptian obelisk that originally stood in the gardens. The present obelisk, incorporated into the Fountain of the Dolphins, was produced in 1972 by sculptor Michel Bourbon. (Note: The original obelisk was erected in the gardens some time before 1589 and moved to the Boboli Gardens in Florence in 1788. There is some uncertainty as to whether a replacement obelisk stood in the gardens between 1788 and 1972.)	
Villa Torlonia obelisks	Alessandro Torlonia (1842)	Villa Torlonia, Via Nomentana 41°54′55.7″N 12°30′40.4″E	10.227 m	Two obelisks in pink Baveno granite, erected in memory of Giovanni and Anna Maria Torlonia, the parents of Prince Alessandro Torlonia.	
Foro Italico obelisk	Benito Mussolini (1932)	Piazza Lauro De Bosis, Foro Italico 41°55′51.2″N 12°27′21.0″E	17.5 m	A Carrara marble obelisk inscribed with "MUSSOLINI DVX". It stands at the entrance to the Foro Italico sports complex. Designed by Costantino Costantini. (Note: Originally dedicated to Benito Mussolini.)	
Marconi	Ministry of Popular Culture (1939)	Piazza Guglielmo Marconi, EUR district 41°50′01″N 12°28′15″E	45 m	Designed by Arturo Dazzi and clad in Carrara marble over reinforced concrete. Commissioned in 1939, interrupted by war, and inaugurated on 12 December 1959. Dedicated to the physicist and inventor Guglielmo Marconi. (Note: Its 92 marble panels depict scenes from Marconi's career.)	
Obelisco Novecento	City of Rome (1998; installed 2003–2004)	Piazzale Pier Luigi Nervi, EUR district 41°49′34.0″N 12°27′58.2″E	21 m	A bronze, conical sculpture by Arnaldo Pomodoro. Unlike traditional obelisks, it is non‑pyramidal and intended to represent the complexities and contradictions of the 20th century ("Novecento").	
Via della Conciliazione lamp posts	Benito Mussolini (1936–1937; completed 1950)	Via della Conciliazione, Rome 41°54′08.6″N 12°27′41.0″E	Unknown	Two rows of obelisk-shaped stone lamp posts lining the avenue connecting central Rome to St. Peter's Basilica. The 28 obelisks, topped with lanterns, were installed when the avenue was completed in 1950. Designed by architects Marcello Piacentini and Attilio Spaccarelli. (Note: The double line of obelisks narrows the original width of the avenue and creates a scenographic effect that guides the visitor's gaze towards the facade of St. Peter's.)	

== Former locations of some obelisks ==
- Lateranense at Karnak, Egypt: 25°43′7.46″N 32°39′26.64″E
- Lateranense at Circus Maximus in Rome: 41°53′6.31″N 12°29′14.45″E
- Vaticano at Forum Iulium in Alexandria, Egypt: 31°11′52.8″N 29°55′9.12″E
- Vaticano at Vatican Circus in Rome: 41°54′5.82″N 12°27′14.94″E
- Flaminio at Heliopolis, Egypt: 30°07′46.3″N 31°17′20″E
- Flaminio at Circus Maximus in Rome: 41°53′12.73″N 12°29′3.4″E
- Solare at Heliopolis, Egypt: 30°07′46.3″N 31°17′20″E
- Solare at Campus Martius in Rome: 41.902842°N 12.477733°E

== See also ==
- Egyptian obelisks
- List of modern obelisks
- List of tourist attractions in Rome

Monoliths

- Cleopatra's Needle
- List of Roman monoliths
- List of largest monoliths in the world

Roman triumphal monuments

- List of Roman triumphal arches
- List of Roman victory columns
