= Palmi =

Palmi may refer to:

== People ==
=== Given name ===
Palmi is an Icelandic male given name. Notable people with this surname include:

- Pálmi Gestsson (born 1957), Icelandic actor and voice actor
- Pálmi Gunnarsson (born 1950), Icelandic musician
- Pálmi Hannesson (1898–1956), Icelandic naturalist
- Pálmi Jónsson (1923–1991), Icelandic entrepreneur
- Pálmi Jónsson (1929–2017), Icelandic politician
- Pálmi Rafn Pálmason (born 1984), Icelandic football player

=== Surname ===
- Dietmar Palmi (born 1964), German table tennis player
- Topias Palmi (born 1994), Finnish basketball player

== Places ==
- Palmi, Calabria

== Species ==
- Mordellistena palmi, species of beetle in the genus Mordellistena of the family Mordellidae
- Pristiorhynchus palmi
- Thrips palmi, insect from the genus Thrips in the order Thysanoptera
