= Mausoleum of Augustus =

Ancient Roman tomb in Rome, Italy

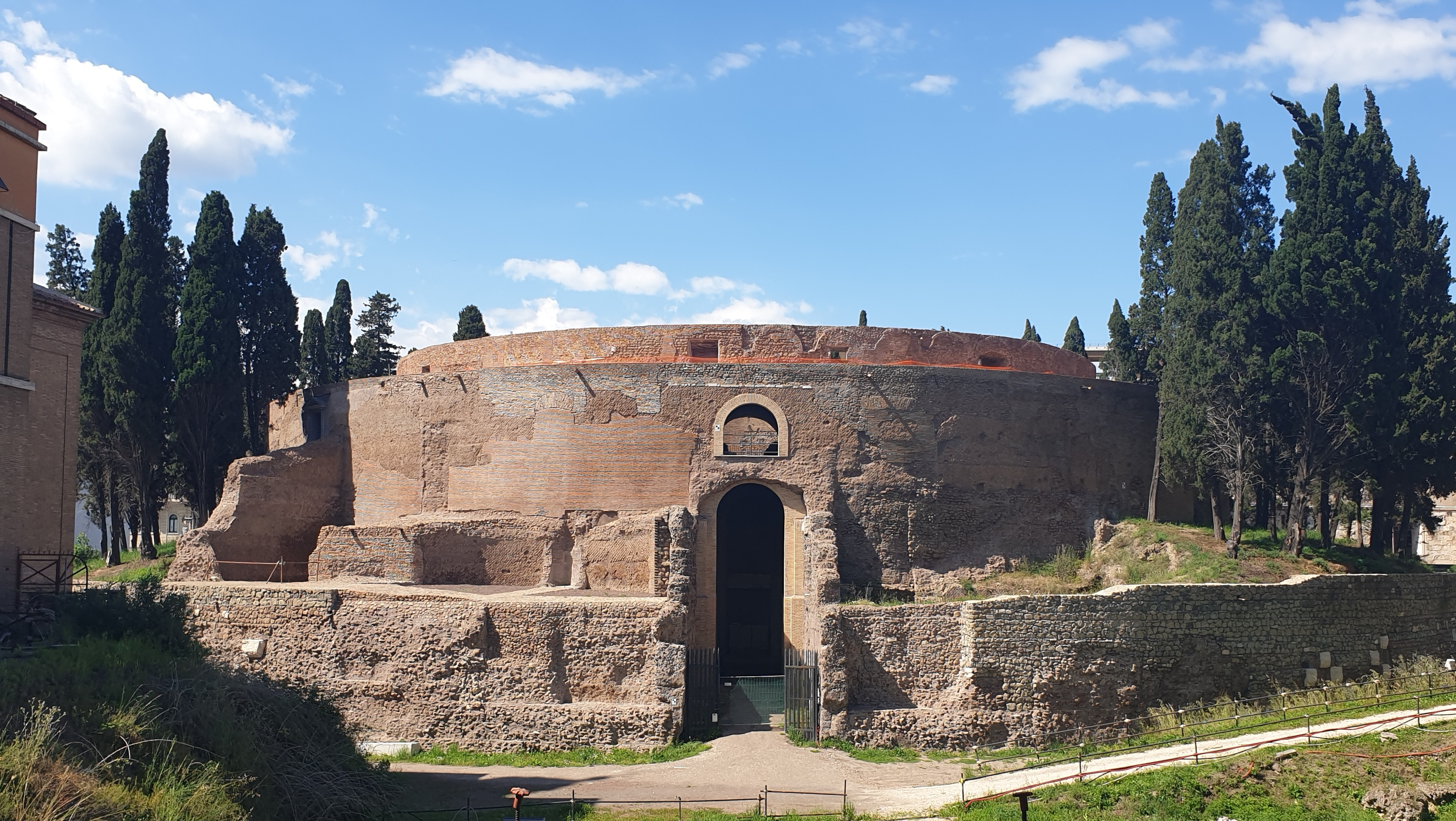
- The restored Mausoleum of Augustus in 2019

- Location within Rome
- Interactive map of Mausoleum of Augustus
- 41°54′22″N 12°28′35″E
- Type: Mausoleum
- Location: Regio IX Circus Flaminius

History
- Built: 28 BC
- Built by: Augustus

The Mausoleum of Augustus (Latin: Mausoleum Augusti; Italian: Mausoleo di Augusto) is a large tomb built by the Roman emperor Augustus in 28 BC on the Campus Martius in Rome, Italy. The mausoleum is located on the Piazza Augusto Imperatore, near the corner with Via di Ripetta as it runs along the Tiber. The grounds cover an area equivalent to a few city blocks nestled between the church of San Carlo al Corso and the Museum of the Ara Pacis. After being closed for fourteen years for restoration work, the mausoleum was temporarily reopened to the public in March 2021. However, the mausoleum has been temporarily closed from June 2022 due to the renovation work in Piazza Augusto Imperatore.

== Description ==
The mausoleum was circular in plan, consisting of several concentric rings of earth and brick, faced with travertine on the exterior, and planted with cypresses on the top tier. The whole structure was capped (possibly, as reconstructions are unsure at best) by a conical roof and a huge bronze statue of Augustus.

Vaults held up the roof and opened up the burial spaces below. Twin pink granite obelisks flanked the arched entryway. These have been removed; one now stands at the Piazza dell'Esquilino (on the north-west side of the Basilica of Santa Maria Maggiore) and the other at the Quirinal fountain. The completed mausoleum measured 90 m (295 ft) in diameter by 42 m (137 ft) in height.

A corridor ran from the entryway into the heart of the mausoleum, where there was a chamber with three niches to hold the golden urns enshrining the ashes of the Imperial Family. Two pillars flanking the entrance were mounted with bronze plaques inscribed with the Res Gestae Divi Augusti, the document describing Augustus' accomplishments and victories. Surrounding the mausoleum was landscaped parkland akin to modern public parks, affording a place of retreat at the heart of Rome's heavily urbanized Campus Martius.

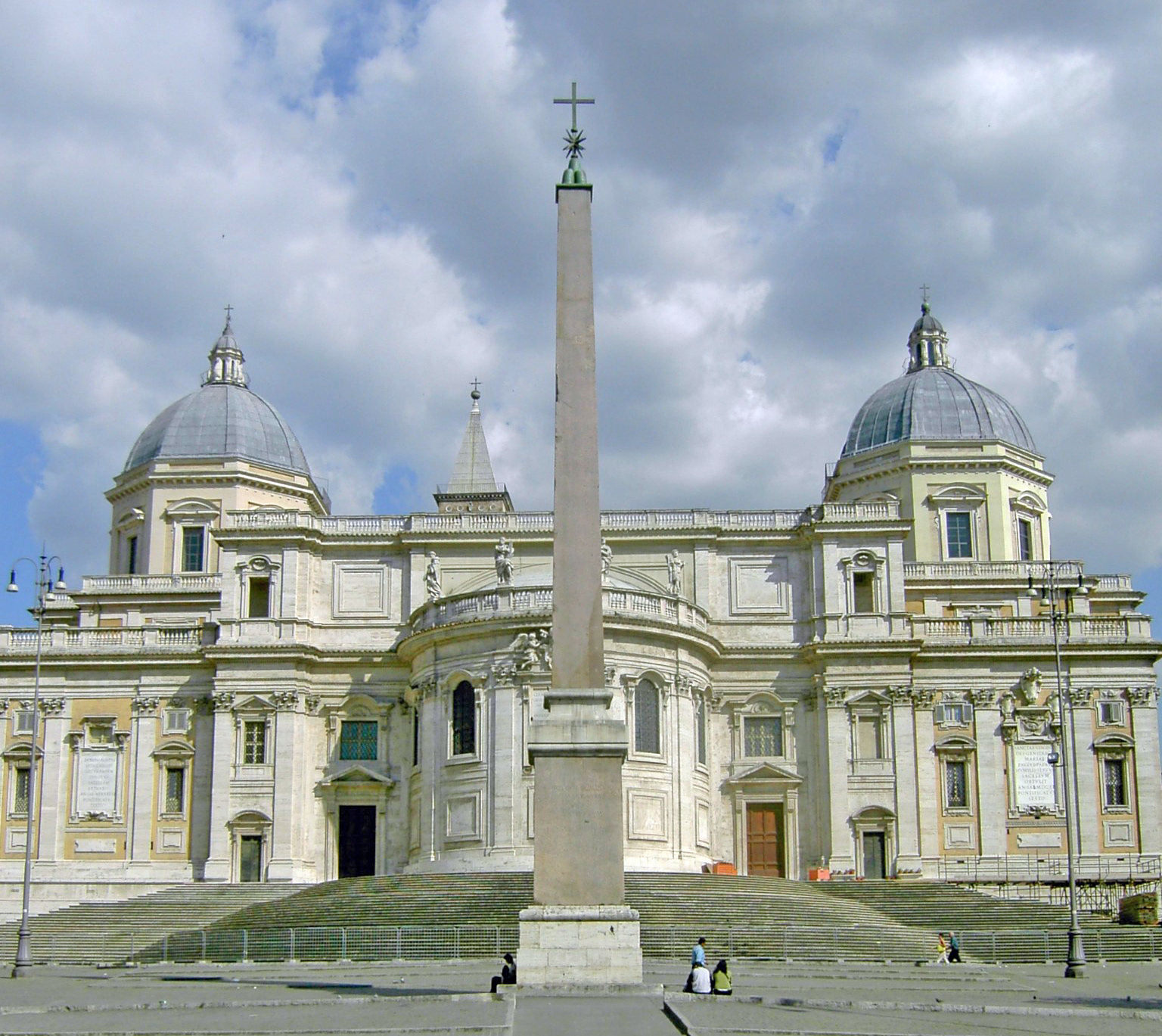
Esquiline obelisk, originally on the western flank of the mausoleum. Found in 1527 and removed in 1587 to Santa Maria Maggiore by Pope Sixtus V.

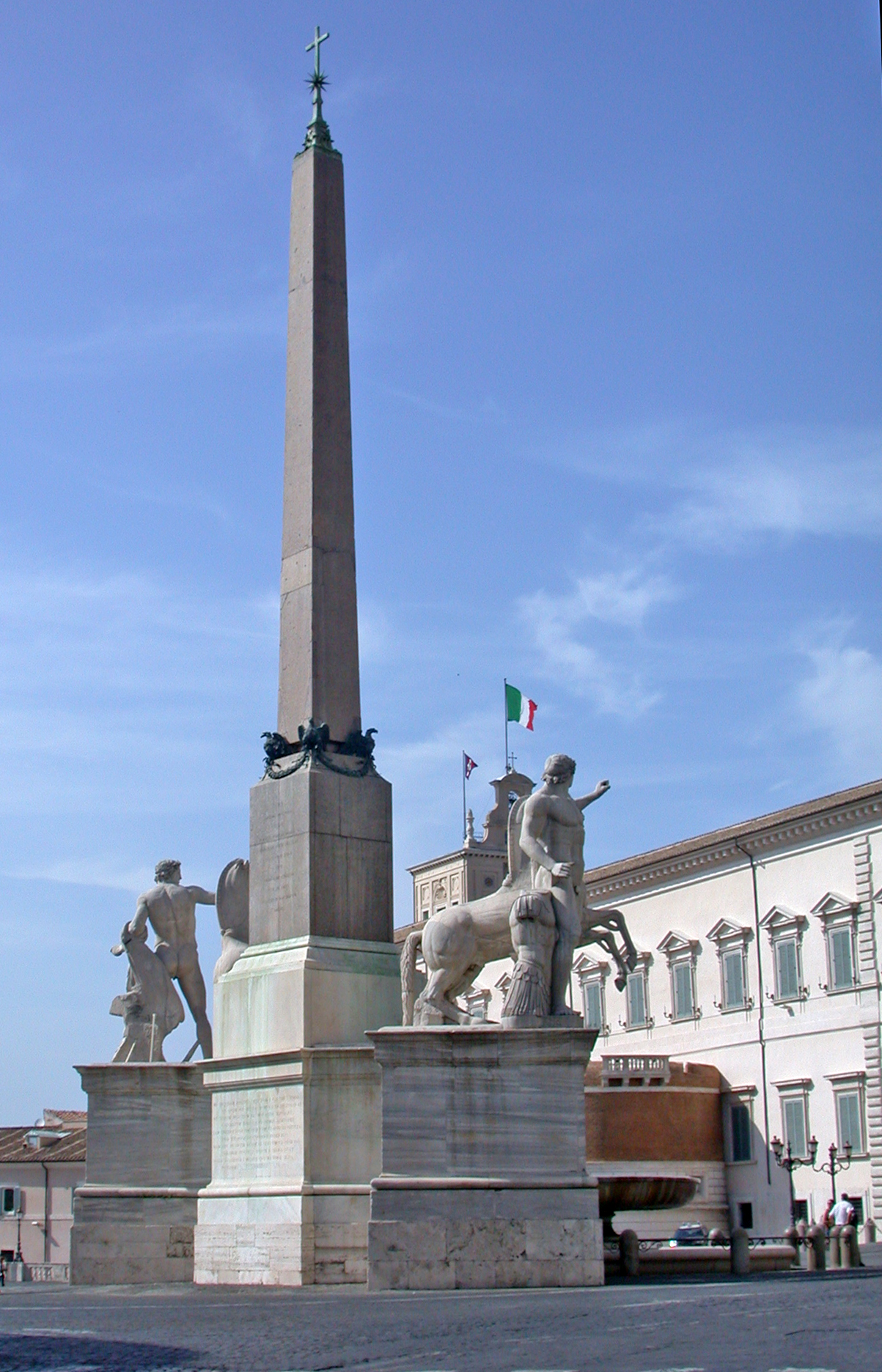
Quirinale obelisk, originally on the eastern flank of the mausoleum. Found in 1527 and removed in 1786 to the Quirinal Hill by Pope Pius VI

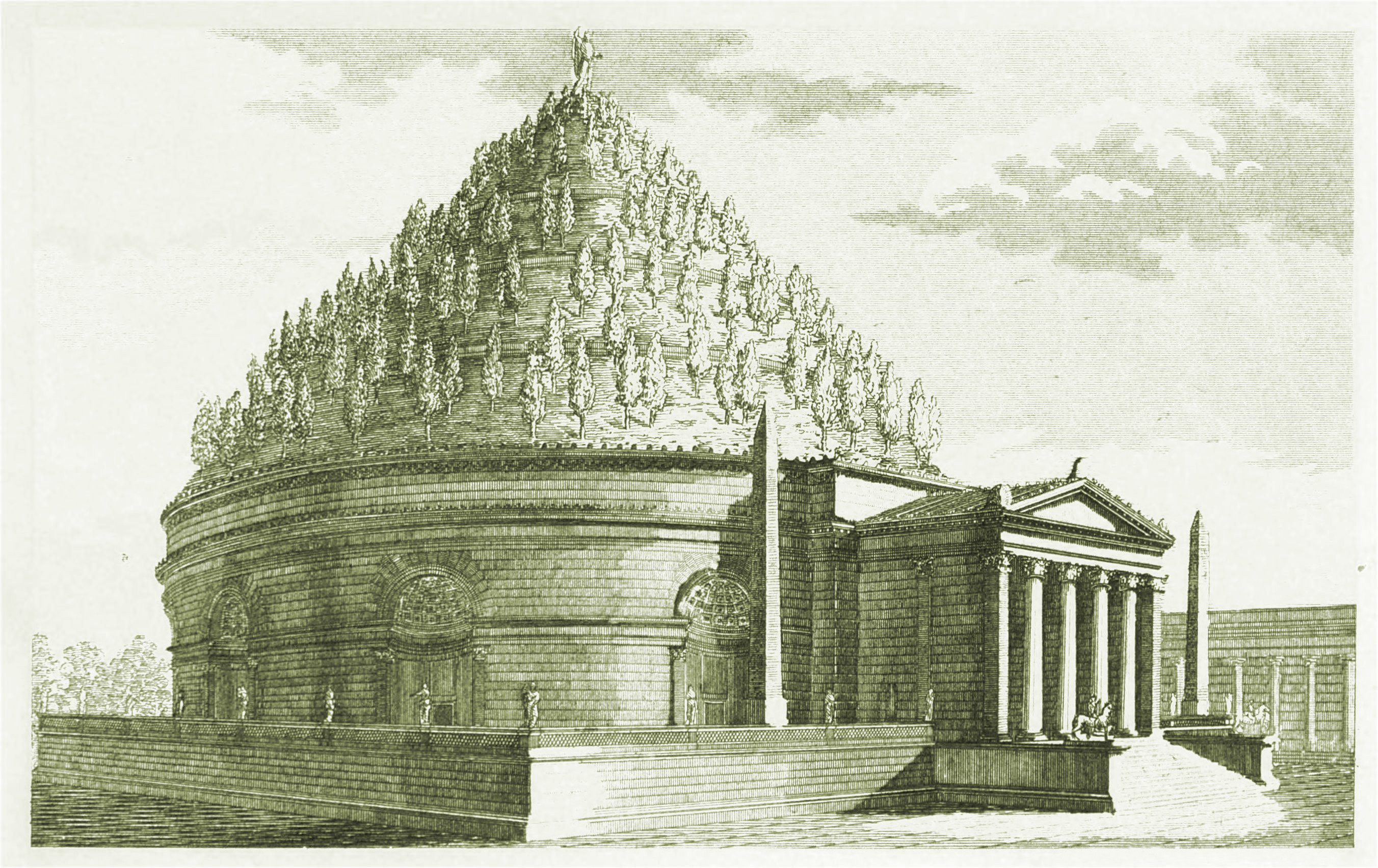
The Mausoleum of Augustus in the 1st century, an 1851 reconstruction.

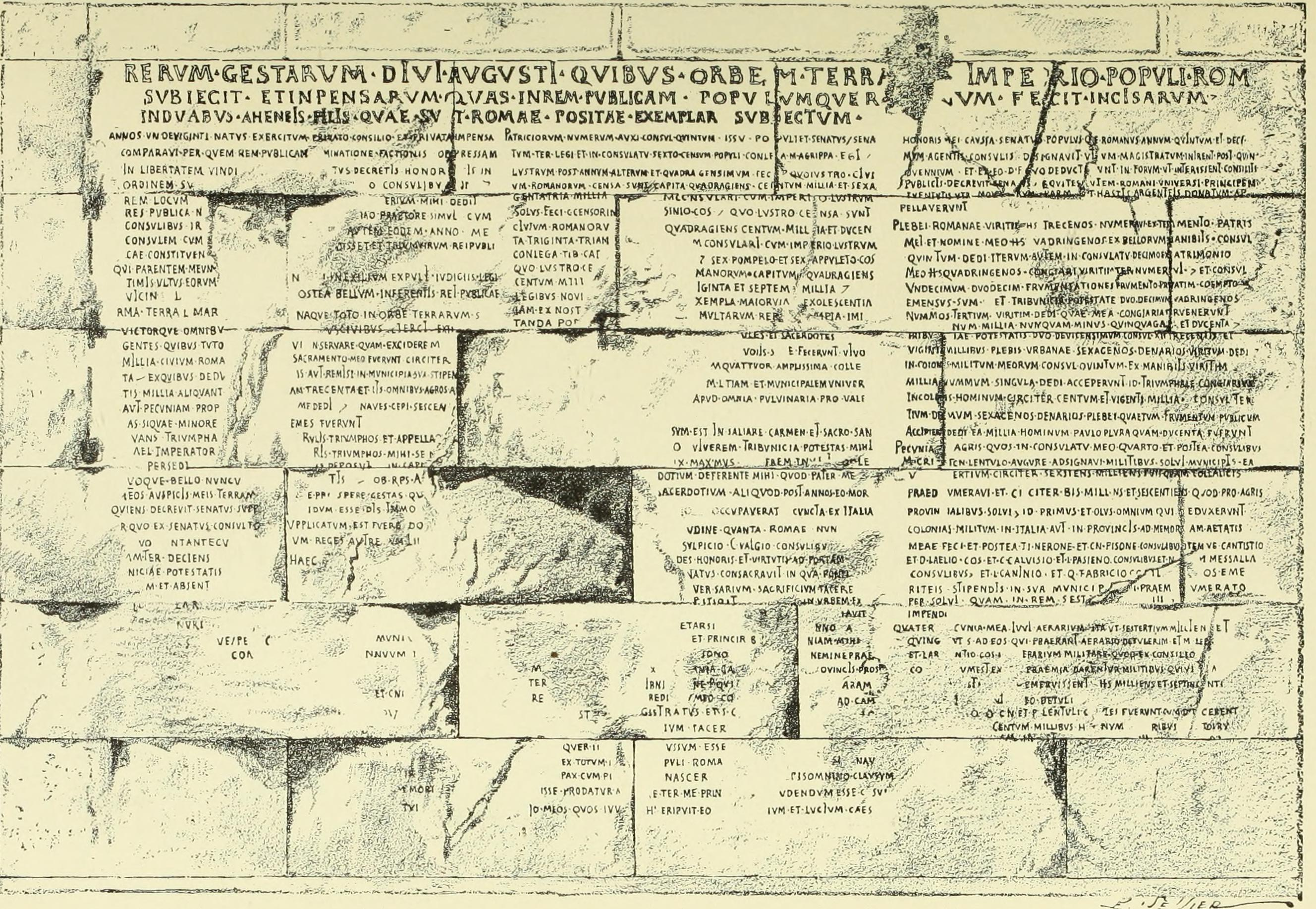
Copy of Text of the Res Gestae Divi Augusti,

== History ==
=== Ancient ===
The mausoleum was one of the first projects initiated by Augustus in the city of Rome following his victory at the Battle of Actium in 31 BC.

The traditional story is that in AD 410, during the sack of Rome by Alaric, the pillaging Visigoths rifled the vaults, stole the urns and scattered the ashes, without damaging the structure of the building. Platner and Ashby, however, posited that "The story of its plundering by Alaric in 410 has no historical foundation, and we know nothing of its destruction".

=== Medieval ===
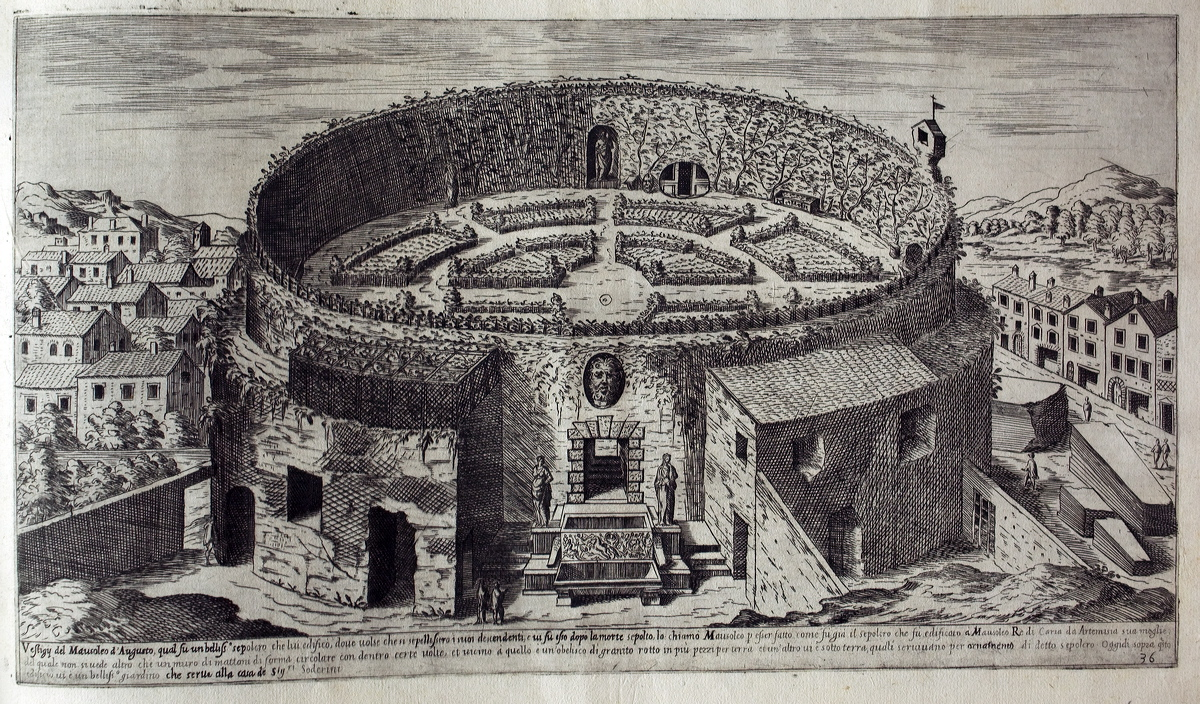
An engraving from I vestigi dell'antichita di Roma by Étienne Dupérac (1575), showing the gardens in the interior of the Mausoleum.

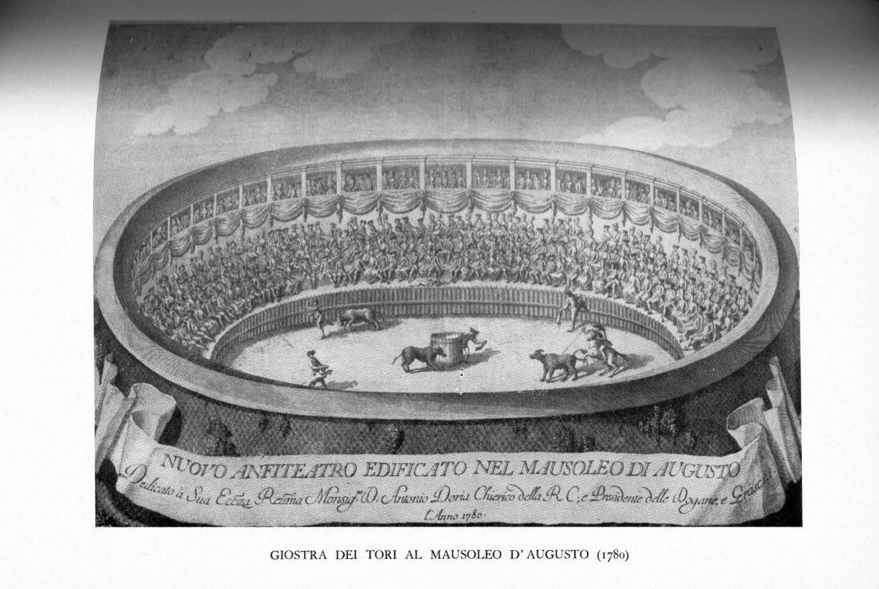
An engraving showing the tournament of bulls held for the inauguration of the theatre (1780).

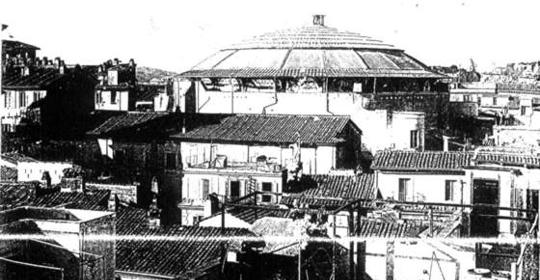
Anfiteatro Correa in 1910

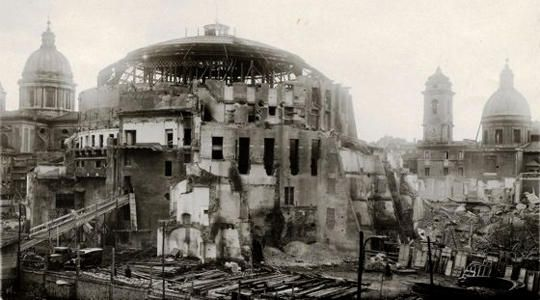
Anfiteatro Correa razed in 1936

By the end of the 10th century, the mausoleum had become largely buried under earth and overgrown with trees, to the point where it was referred to as the Mons Augustus. A legend of the time referred to a supposed decree by Augustus who ordered that a basketful of earth from every province of the empire was to be thrown upon his tomb, so that he could rest on the soil of the whole world over which he ruled. Atop the Mausoleum stood a chapel built to the Archangel Michael, while alongside was the Church of Santa Maria (or perhaps Martina) in Augusto (later transformed into San Giacomo degli Incurabili).

By the 12th century, the tumulus was fortified as a castle – as was the mausoleum of Hadrian, which was turned into the Castel Sant'Angelo – and occupied by the Colonna family. After the disastrous defeat of the Commune of Rome at the hands of the Count of Tusculum in 1167, the Colonna were disgraced and banished, and their fortification in the Campo was dismantled. Throughout the Renaissance it passed through the ownership of several major Roman families, who used it as a garden.

=== Modern ===
In the early 20th century, the interior of the Mausoleum was used as a concert hall called the Augusteo, until Benito Mussolini ordered it closed in the 1930s and restored it to the status of an archaeological site. The restoration of the Mausoleum of Augustus to a place of prominence featured in Mussolini's ambitious reordering of the city of Rome which strove to connect the aspirations of Italian Fascism with the former glories of the Roman Empire. Mussolini viewed himself especially connected to the achievements of Augustus, seeing himself as a 'reborn Augustus' ready to usher in a new age of Italian dominance. This restoration occurred in 1937, on the 2000th anniversary of Augustus' birth.

=== Restoration ===
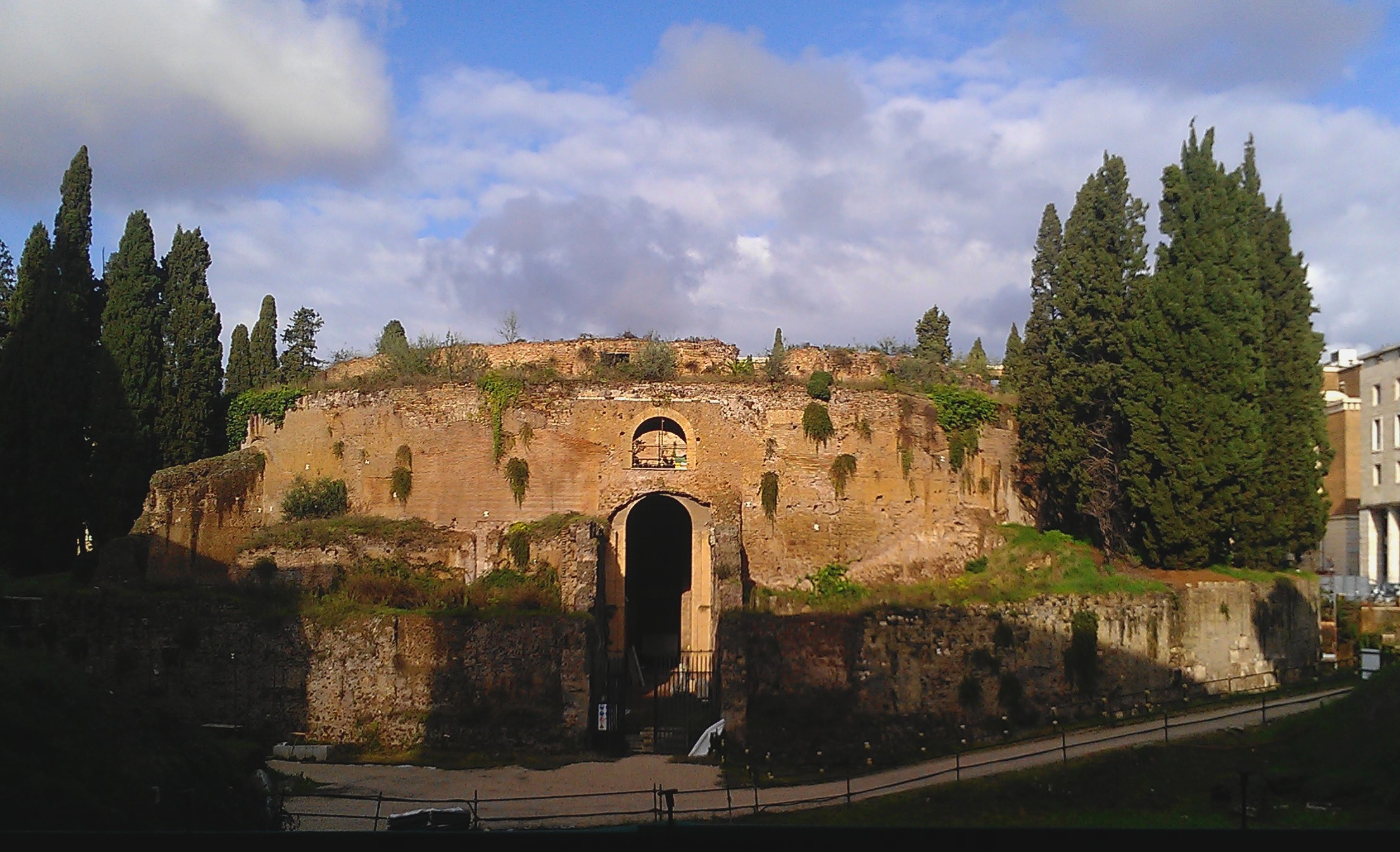
The Mausoleum of Augustus in 2016

The neglect of the mausoleum—closed to the public, overgrown with vegetation, and used as a dumping ground for litter—attracted criticism, especially after the opening of the Ara Pacis museum across the street in 2006. A plan to restore the mausoleum in time for the 2000th anniversary of Augustus's death in 2014 failed due to funding shortfalls.

In January 2017, Italian authorities announced a €6 million grant from Telecom Italia for a comprehensive restoration of the Mausoleum of Augustus, allowing it to open to the public for the first time since the 1970s. The Mausoleum was slated for a full restoration incorporating a multimedia exhibition of modern and ancient Rome projected on the interior walls of the structure to be completed by April 2019. The schedule was not met, shifting the deadline to early 2021. The costs expanded to €11 million, although this was partially offset by additional grants from Telecom Italia's successor Gruppo TIM.

The mausoleum opened to visitors in 2021, although additional restoration—including the central cylinder housing Augustus' burial chamber—was left undone, scheduled for completion in 2022. The projected date for the mausoleum's reopening has been varied, and currently the mausoleum has been temporarily closed since June 6, 2022 to allow for redevelopment of Piazza Augusto Imperatore to progress. A new museum layout is being designed by Dutch architect Rem Koolhaas and partly financed by the Bvlgari Group. The work is expected to be completed by the end of 2026.

== Burials ==
The inscribed marble block that held the cinerary urn of Agrippina in the Mausoleum of Augustus (now in the Capitoline Museums)

Included among those whose remains were laid inside the mausoleum before the death of Augustus were:

- Marcus Claudius Marcellus (son of Octavia Minor), who was the first to be buried there, in 23 BC
- Marcus Vipsanius Agrippa (husband of Julia the Elder)
- Nero Claudius Drusus (son of Livia Drusilla; husband of Antonia Minor and father of Claudius)
- Octavia Minor (sister of Augustus)
- Gaius Caesar and Lucius Caesar (grandsons of Augustus)

After the death of Augustus, the mausoleum hosted the remains of:

- Augustus
- Livia Drusilla (wife of Augustus)
- Tiberius
- Drusus Julius Caesar (son of Tiberius)
- Germanicus (son of Antonia Minor)
- Julia Livilla (daughter of Germanicus)
- Drusus Caesar (son of Germanicus)
- Julia Drusilla (daughter of Caligula)
- Antonia Minor (mother of Claudius)
- Britannicus (son of Claudius)
- Claudius
- Agrippina the Elder (daughter of Julia the Elder)
- Nero Julius Caesar (son of Agrippina the Elder)
- Nerva, the last emperor for whom the mausoleum was opened

== Legacy ==
The Roman poet Martial wrote about the building:

Pour me a double measure, of Falernian, Callistus,
and you Alcimus, melt over it summer snows,
let my sleek hair be soaked with excess of perfume,
my brow be wearied beneath the sewn-on rose.
The Mausoleum tells us to live, that one nearby,
it teaches us that the gods themselves can die.

== See also ==
- Menologium Rusticum Colotianum, discovered near the mausoleum
- Ara Pacis & Solarium Augusti, nearby
- Pyramid of Cestius & Obelisks of Rome
- Pons Cestius
- Catacombs of Rome
- List of ancient monuments in Rome

Preceded by Columbarium of Pomponius Hylas	Landmarks of Rome; Mausoleum of Augustus	Succeeded by Mausoleum of Helena
