= Antinous Obelisk =

- Obelisco del Pincio
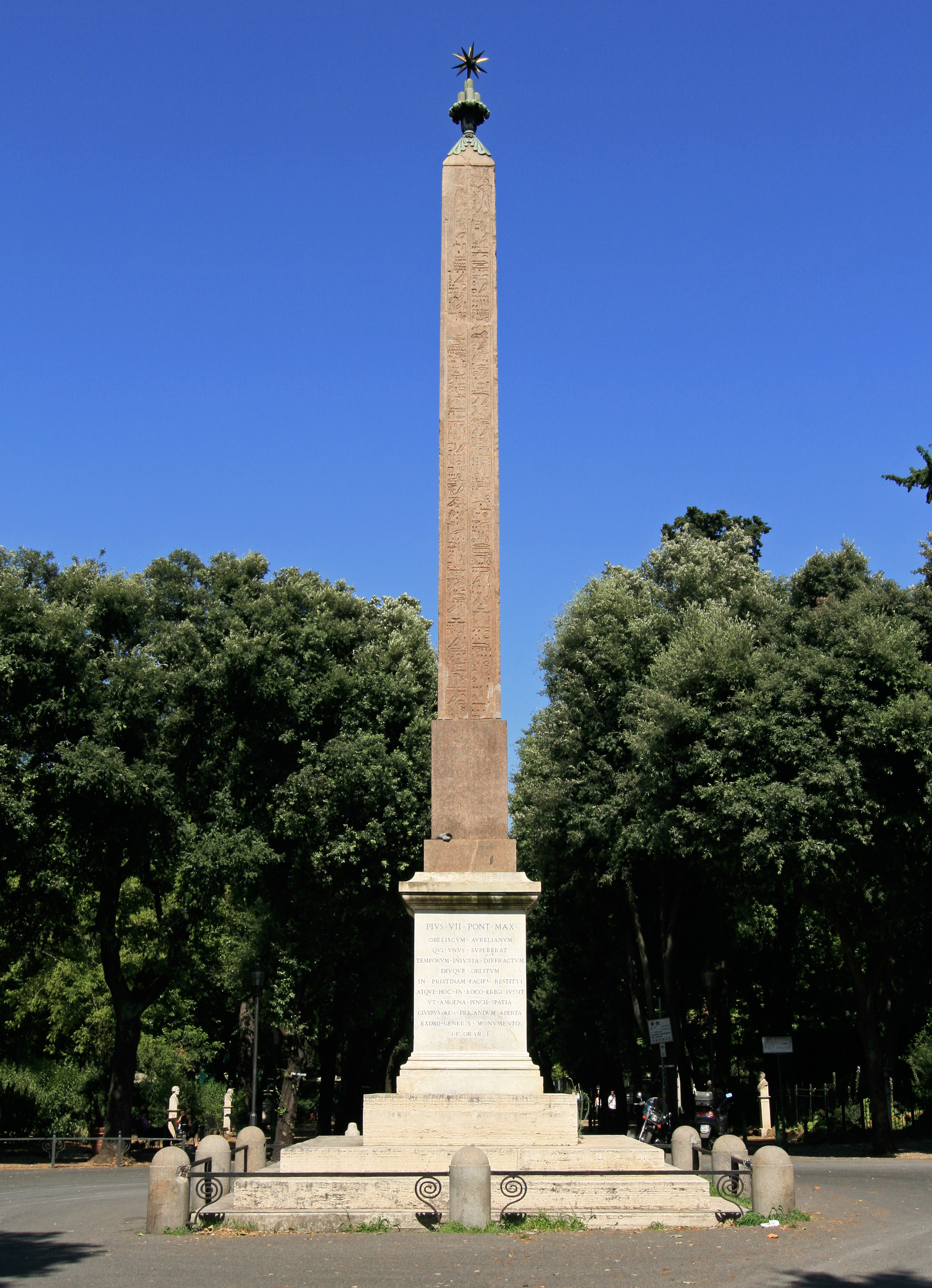
- The obelisk in 2008
- Interactive map of Antinous Obelisk
- Location: Rome, Italy

The Antinous Obelisk, or Aurelian Obelisk, is an obelisk on Pincian Hill, in Rome, Italy.

== See also ==
- List of obelisks in Rome
