= Pincian Hill =

Hill in Rome, Italy

Coordinates: 41°54′42″N 12°28′47″E

- Hill of Rome
- Latin name: Collis Hortorum ("Hill of the Gardens"), or Mons Pincius
- Italian name: Pincio
- Rione: Campo Marzio
- Buildings: Galleria Borghese, Borghese gardens, Horti Lucullani, Horti Sallustiani, Horti Pompeiani, Horti Aciliorum, Piazza del Popolo
- People: Pincii, Scipione Borghese

The Pincian Hill (/ˈpɪnʃ(i)ən/ PIN-sh(ee-)ən; Italian: Pincio [ˈpintʃo]; Latin: Mons Pincius) is a hill in the northeast quadrant of the historical centre of Rome. The hill lies to the north of the Quirinal, overlooking the Campus Martius. It was outside the original boundaries of the ancient city of Rome, and was not one of the Seven hills of Rome, but it lies within the wall built by Roman Emperor Aurelian between 270 and 273.

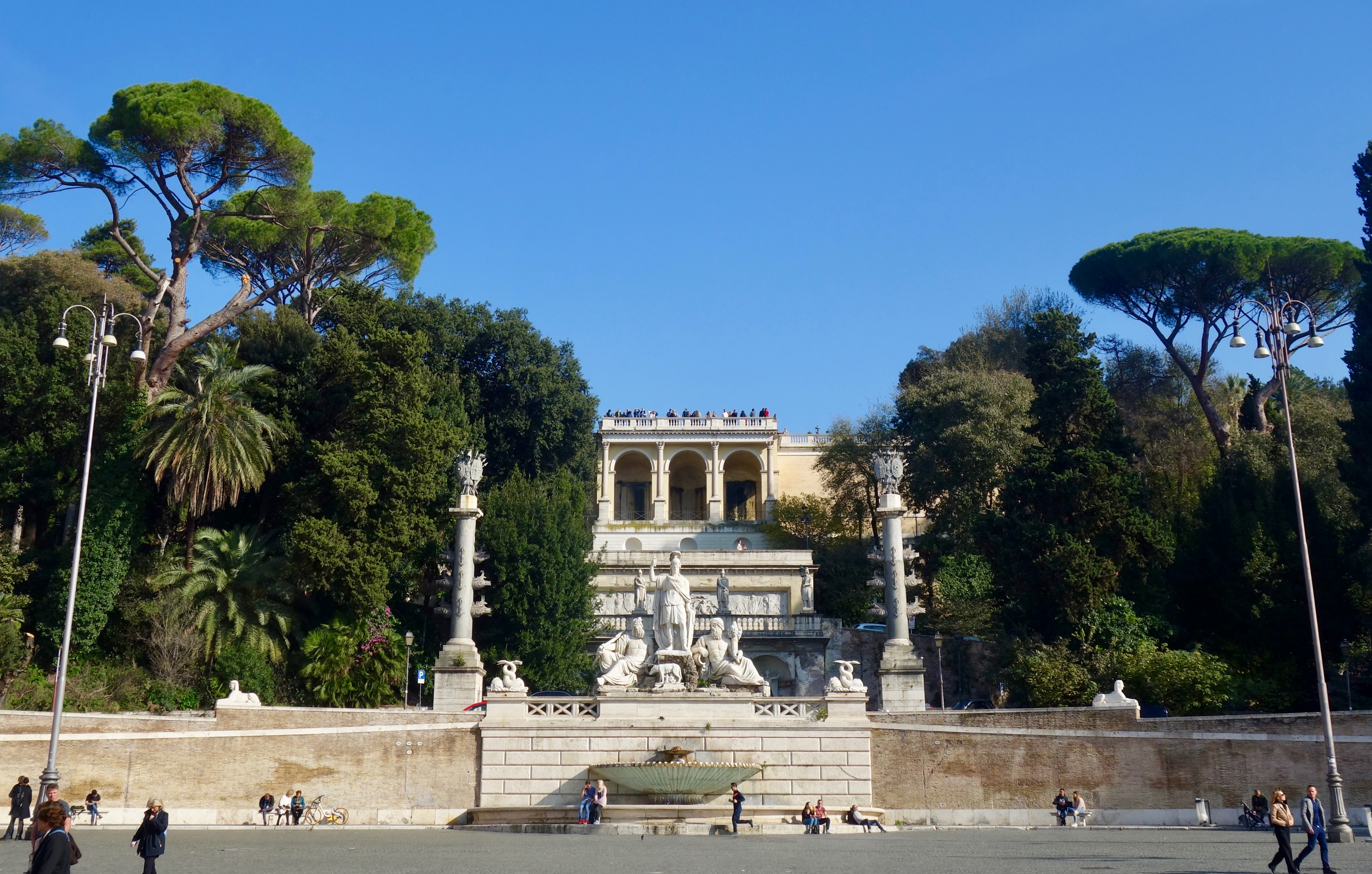
Ascent of the Terrazza del Pincio from piazza del Popolo

== Villas and gardens ==
Several important families in Ancient Rome had villas and gardens (horti) on the south-facing slopes in the late Roman Republic, including the Horti Lucullani (created by Lucullus), the Horti Sallustiani (created by the historian Sallust), the Horti Pompeiani, and the Horti Aciliorum. The hill came to be known in Roman times as Collis Hortorum (the "Hill of Gardens"). Its current name comes from the Pincii, one of the families that occupied it in the 4th century AD.

== Modern Rome ==
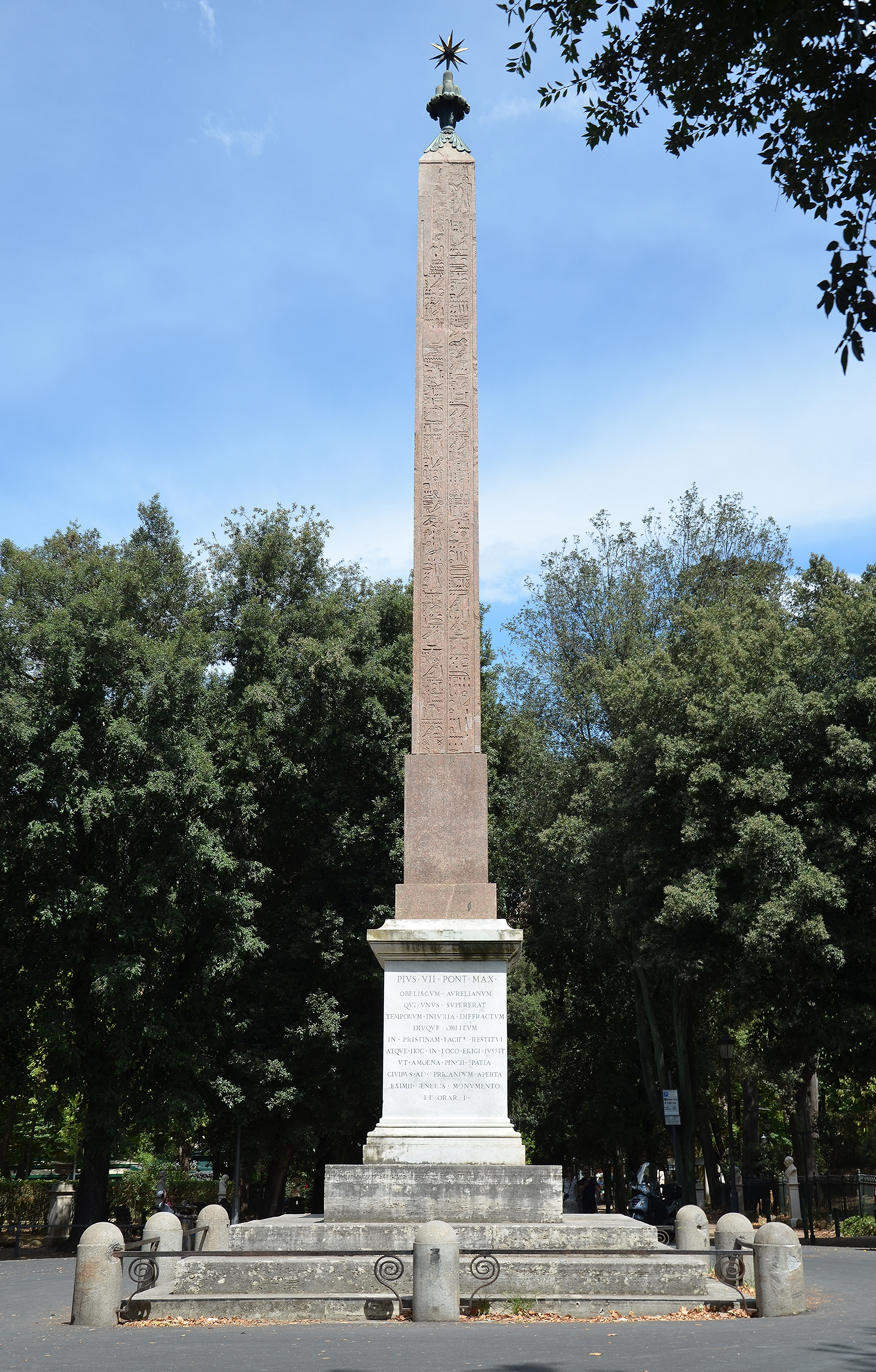
The Pincian Obelisk

The Pincio as seen today was laid out in 1809–14 by Giuseppe Valadier; the French Academy at Rome had moved into the Villa Medici in 1802. The orchards of the Pincio were laid out with wide gravelled allées (viali) that are struck through dense boschi to unite some pre-existing features: one viale extends a garden axis of the Villa Medici to the obelisk placed at the center of radiating viali. This obelisk was erected by Pope Pius VII in September 1822 to provide an eye-catcher in the vistas. It is a Roman-carved obelisk (similar to the Sallustiano obelisk), not an Egyptian one, erected outside the Porta Maggiore under the Emperor Hadrian in the early 2nd century, as part of a memorial to his beloved Antinous. The Piazza Napoleone – in fact Napoleon's grand urbanistic example was set from a distance, as he never visited Rome – is a grand open space that looks out over Piazza del Popolo, also laid out by Valadier, and provides views to the west, and of the skyline of Rome beyond. Valadier linked the two spaces with formal staircases broken by generous landings, and a switchback carriageway.

In 1873, a hydrochronometer on the 1867 design of Gian Battista Embriaco, O.P. inventor and professor of the College of St. Thomas in Rome was built on the Pincian Hill in emulation of the one at the College of St. Thomas. Another version stands in the Villa Borghese gardens. Embriaco had presented two prototypes of his invention at the Paris Universal Exposition in 1867 where it won prizes and great acclaim.

In the gardens of the Pincio, it was Giuseppe Mazzini's urging that lined the viali with busts of notable Italians.

Though the Villa Ludovisi was built over at the turn of the 20th century, several villas and their gardens still occupy the hill, including the Villa Borghese gardens, linked to the Pincio by a pedestrian bridge that crosses the via del Muro Torto in the narrow cleft below; the Muro Torto is the winding stretch of the Aurelian Wall, pierced by the Porta Pinciana.

== See also ==
- List of obelisks in Rome
- Aventine Hill (Aventino)
- Caelian Hill (Celio)
- Capitoline Hill (Capitolino)
- Cispian Hill (Cispio)
- Esquiline Hill (Esquilino)
- Janiculum Hill (Gianicolo)
- Monte Mario
- Oppian Hill (Oppio)
- Palatine Hill (Palatino)
- Quirinal Hill (Quirinale)
- Vatican Hill (Vaticano)
- Velian Hill (Velia)
- Viminal Hill (Viminale)
