= Marconi Obelisk =

Obelisk in Rome

Obelisco di Marconi
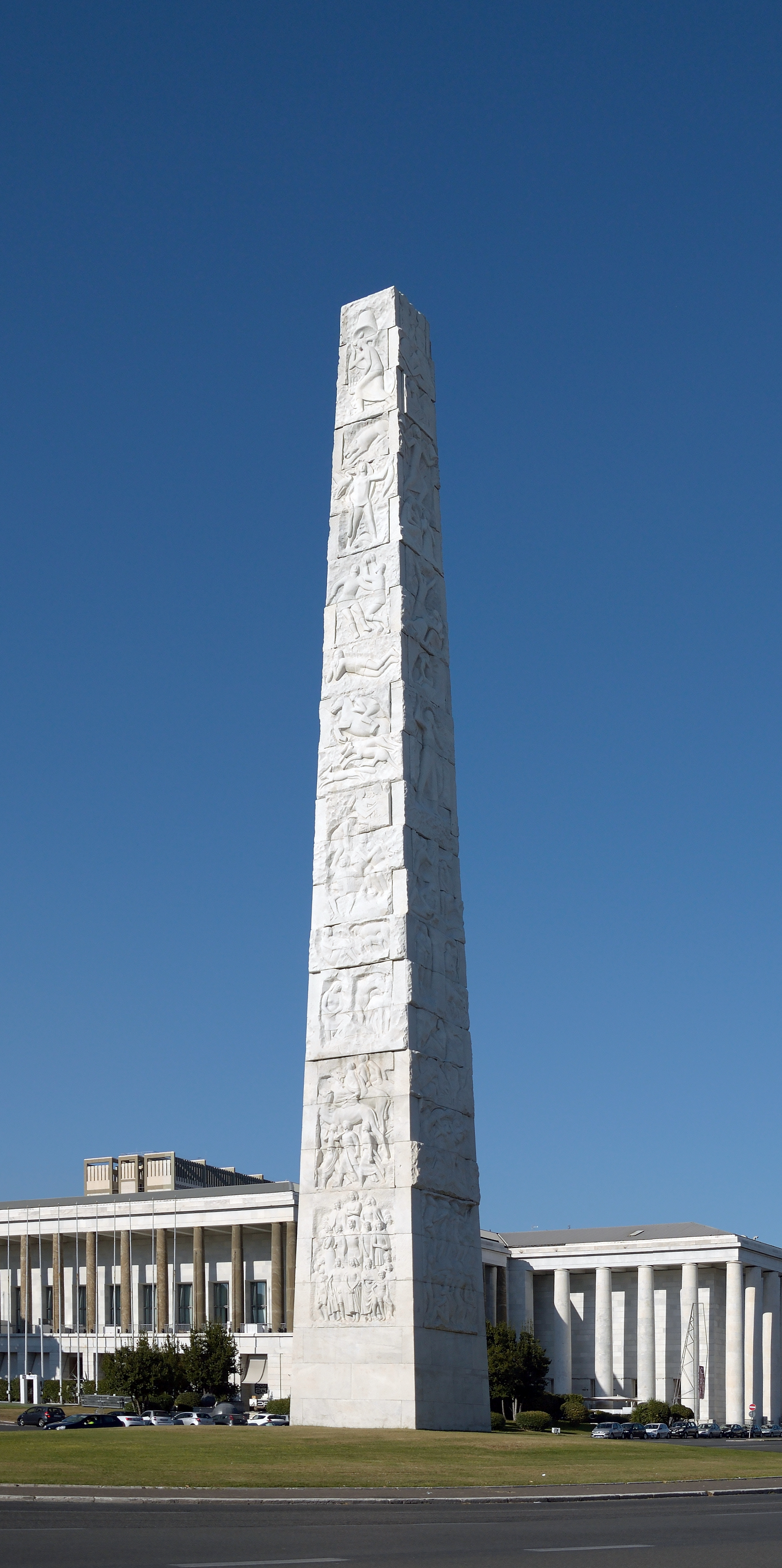
- The Marconi Obelisk in Piazza Guglielmo Marconi, EUR.
- Click on the map for a fullscreen view
- Location: Rome (Italy), Piazza Guglielmo Marconi
- Coordinates: 41°50′01″N 12°28′15″E
- Designer: Arturo Dazzi
- Material: Carrara marble (coating), reinforced concrete
- Height: 45.00 m (147.64 ft)
- Opening date: 1939–1940; 1951–1959
- Dedicated to: Guglielmo Marconi

The Obelisk of Marconi, or Obelisk of EUR, is an obelisk of Rome (Italy), counted among the most modern in the city together with the Obelisco Novecento (by Arnaldo Pomodoro) and the obelisks of the Foro Italico, Villa Torlonia and Villa Medici.

The obelisk in context

A work of the sculptor Arturo Dazzi, it is dedicated to the physicist, inventor and senator Guglielmo Marconi.

== History ==
The work was commissioned in 1939 by the Ministry of Popular Culture to the sculptor Arturo Dazzi from Carrara to decorate Piazza Imperiale – which, according to the project of the 1942 World's fair of Rome, should have been located in the center of the newborn quarter – and to commemorate the physicist and inventor Guglielmo Marconi (who had died 2 years earlier).

With the entry of Italy into the World War II in 1940, the works were suddenly interrupted, even if Dazzi had already completed the first two registers, carved in high relief on Carrara marble. In 1951 work resumed, despite the intention of the Ministry of Public Works, chaired by Salvatore Aldisio, to demolish the structure.

In 1953, on the occasion of an Agricultural Exhibition held in EUR, the sculptor refused to cover the reinforced concrete structure with temporary panels of gesso and, after having requested some funding in view of the 1960 Summer Olympics, the monument was concluded and inaugurated on 12 December 1959.

== Description ==
The structure of the obelisk has the shape of a truncated pyramid and is made up of reinforced concrete covered with 92 slabs of Carrara marble, on which the high reliefs, arranged in 4 rows, are carved.

The obelisk is placed in the center of the square, today named after Guglielmo Marconi; in the green flowerbed that surrounds it, the sculpture The awakening, a work by Seward Johnson, was placed in 2009 and removed in 2011.
