= Esquiline Obelisk =

Landmark in Rome, Italy

- Obelisco Esquilino
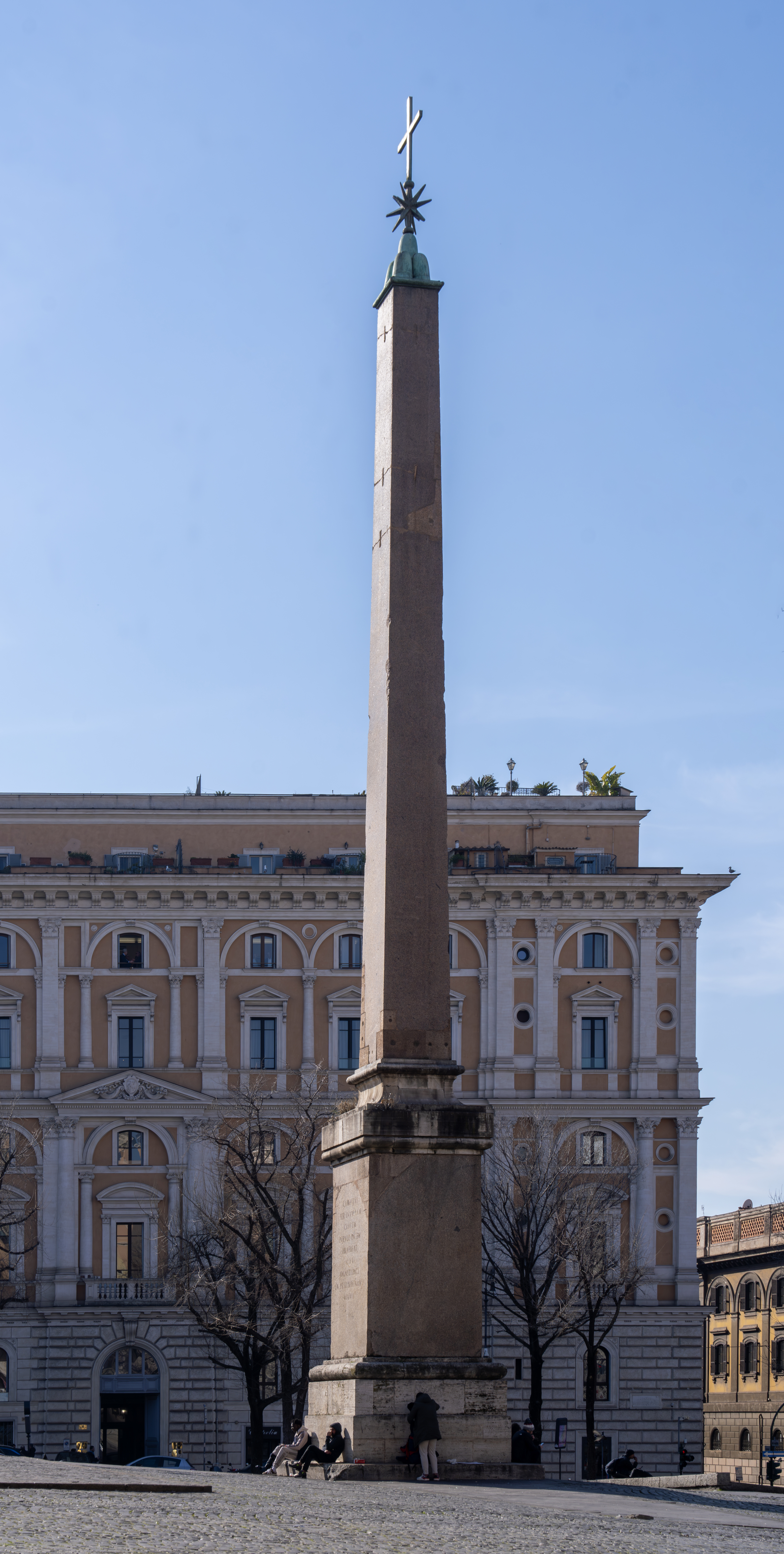
- The obelisk in 2019
- Interactive map of Esquiline Obelisk
- Location: Rome, Italy

The Esquiline Obelisk (Italian: Obelisco Esquilino), also known as the Liberian Obelisk, is installed in Piazza dell'Esquilino, outside the Santa Maria Maggiore, in Rome, Italy.

== See also ==
- List of obelisks in Rome
