= Piazza dell'Esquilino =

Square in Rome, Italy

- Square
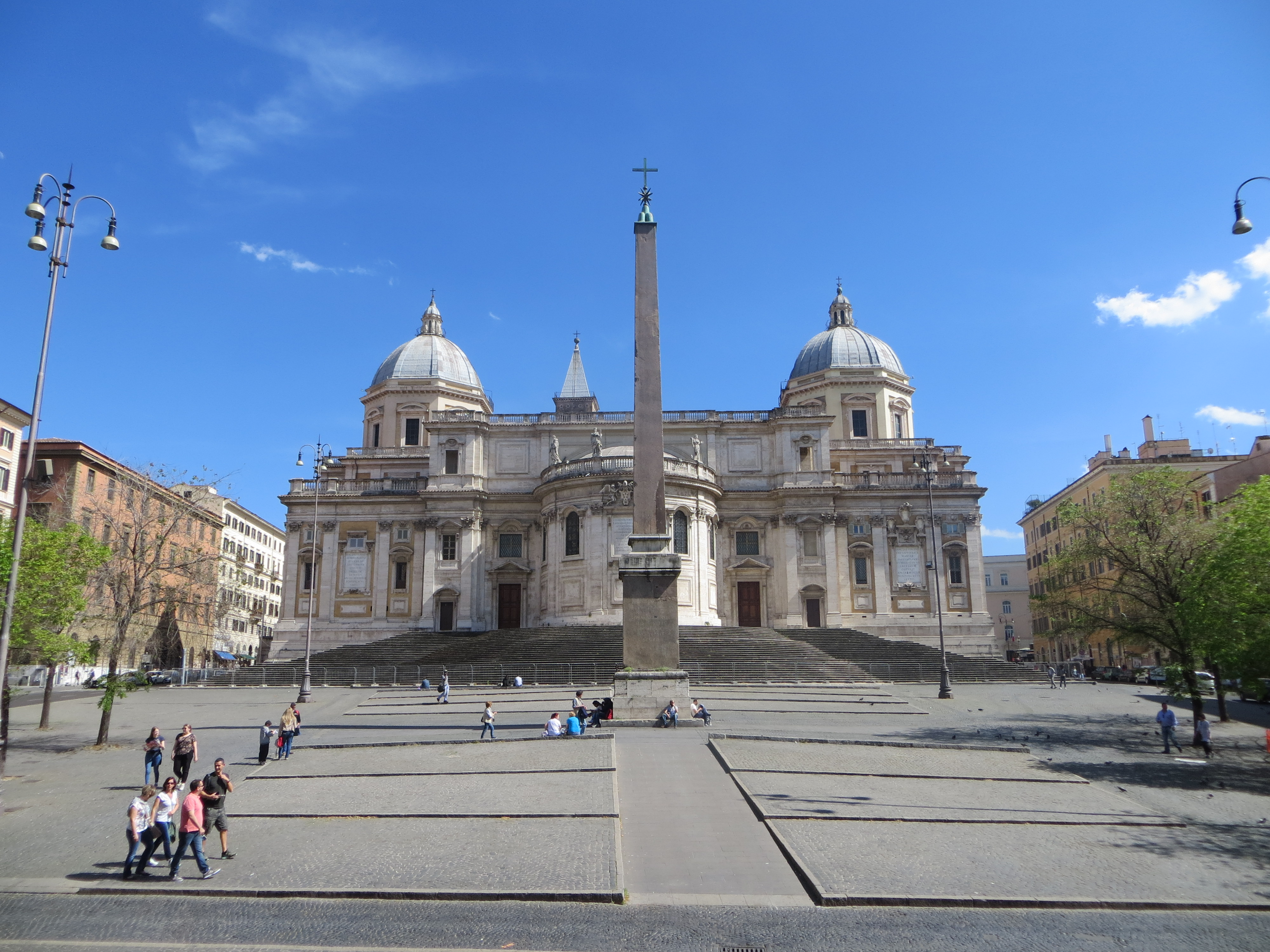
- Location: Rome, Italy
- Interactive map of Piazza dell'Esquilino

Piazza dell'Esquilino is a square in Rome, Italy. The Esquiline Obelisk is installed in the square.
