= Piazza Augusto Imperatore =

Piazza in Rome

- Square
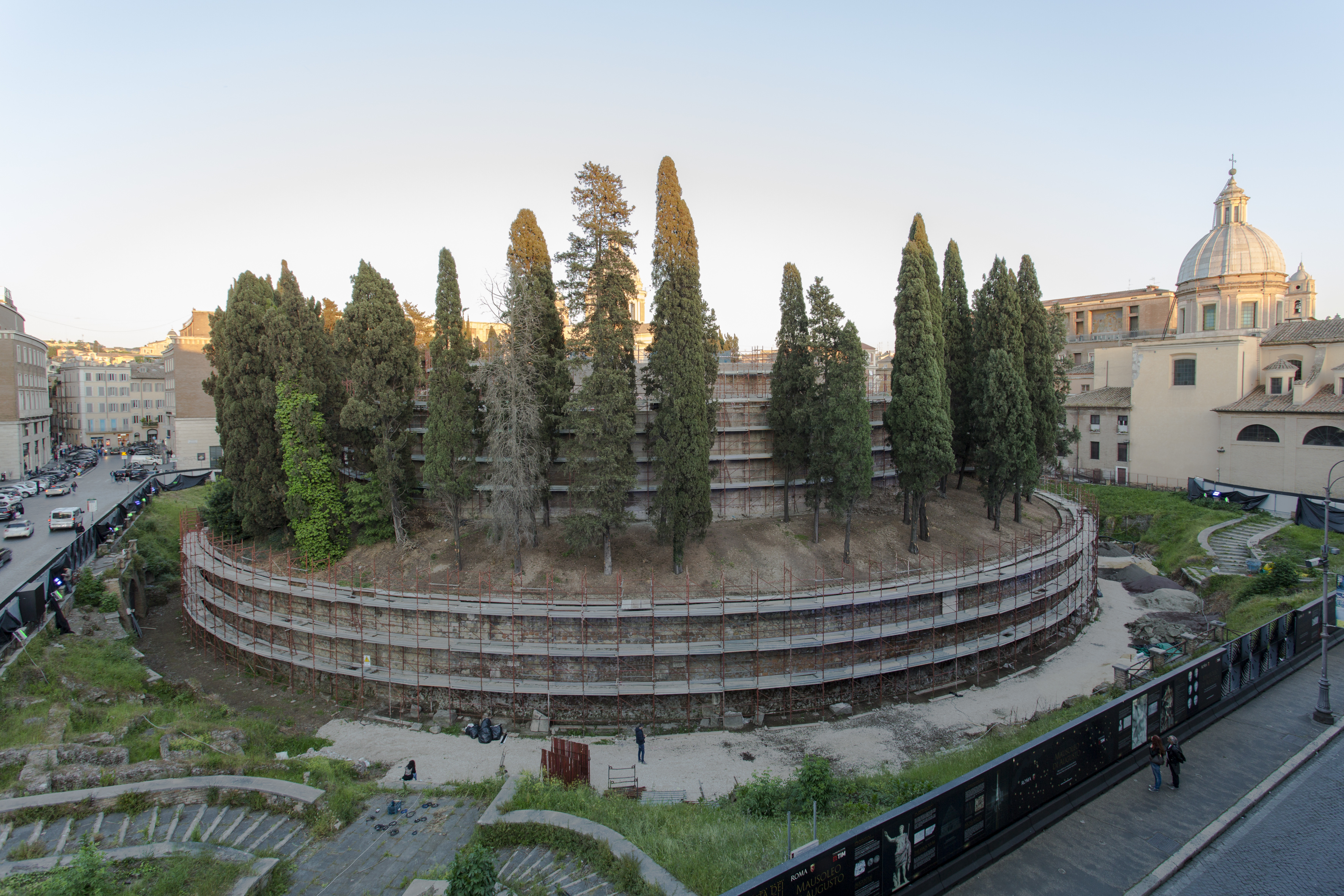
- Piazza Augusto Imperatore during the works for the restoration of the Mausoleum of Augustus in 2017
- Design: Vittorio Ballio Morpurgo
- Constructed: 1934
- Completed: 1952
- Opened: 1937
- Architectural style: Rationalism
- Dedicated to: Caesar Augustus
- Location: Rome, Italy
- Interactive map of Piazza Augusto Imperatore
- Coordinates: 41°54′21.0″N 12°28′37.0″E

Piazza Augusto Imperatore is an urban square in Rome, Italy, created in 1937 by the fascist regime to enhance the Mausoleum of Augustus.

== History ==
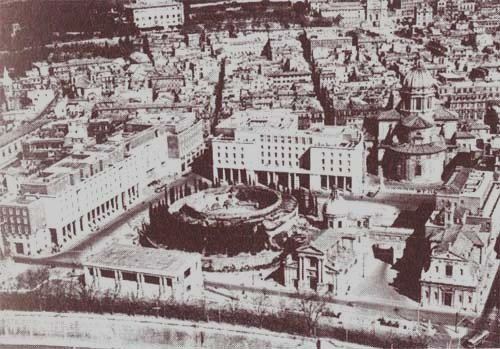
Aerial view of the square in 1937, during construction works. The Mausoleum of Augustus is surrounded by the three INPS buildings, the Museum of the Ara Pacis and two churches: San Rocco at the Augusteum (on the left) and San Girolamo dei Croati (on the right). The bigger church at the top right is Sant'Ambrogio e Carlo al Corso.

The demolitions of buildings around the Mausoleum of Augustus began in 1934, following the Rome Master Plan approved in 1931, with the aim, typical of the fascist regime, to celebrate the monuments of ancient Rome. The architectural isolation of the Mausoleum from the other buildings was obtained through a large demolition work, which destroyed about 120 buildings (the former San Rocco Hospital among others) on an area of about 28,000 square metres (300,000 sq ft) up to Lungotevere in Augusta, similarly to other building projects carried out throughout the city in those years, such as Via della Conciliazione and Via dell'Impero. The design of the square is due to Vittorio Ballio Morpurgo, but Massimo Piacentini (first cousin of the more famous Marcello) was also involved in it.

To enhance the monument, the square was surrounded by the three new large headquarters of the INPS, in the rationalist style, which were built in 1938 on the north, east and south sides. The west side, in the area of the former Port of Ripetta (no longer existing at that time), was occupied by a celebratory structure made of glass and concrete, which housed the restored Ara Pacis Augustae: this first temporary structure, designed by Morpurgo on the occasion of the Bimillennium of Augustus in 1938, was replaced only in 2006 by the present edifice designed by Richard Meier, which houses the Museum of the Ara Pacis.

The works were definitively stopped only in 1952, following the mobilization of Italia Nostra which criticized the plans for a further development of the square.

In the summer of 2020, a new construction site was opened for an overall urban re-development of the square, with an expected duration of 2 years.

== See also ==
- Mausoleum of Augustus
- Ara Pacis
- Museum of the Ara Pacis
- INPS buildings at Piazza Augusto Imperatore

== Bibliography ==
- Anna Cambedda; Maria Grazia Tolomeo (1991). Una trasformazione urbana, Piazza Augusto Imperatore a Roma (in Italian). Vol. 41. Palombi.
- Betti, Fabio, D'Amelio Angela Maria, and Rossella Leone, Mausoleo di Augusto: demolizioni e scavi; fotografie 1928/1941, Electa, 2011.
