= Anfiteatro Correa =

Former theatre in Rome (1780–1936)

- Correa Amphitheatre
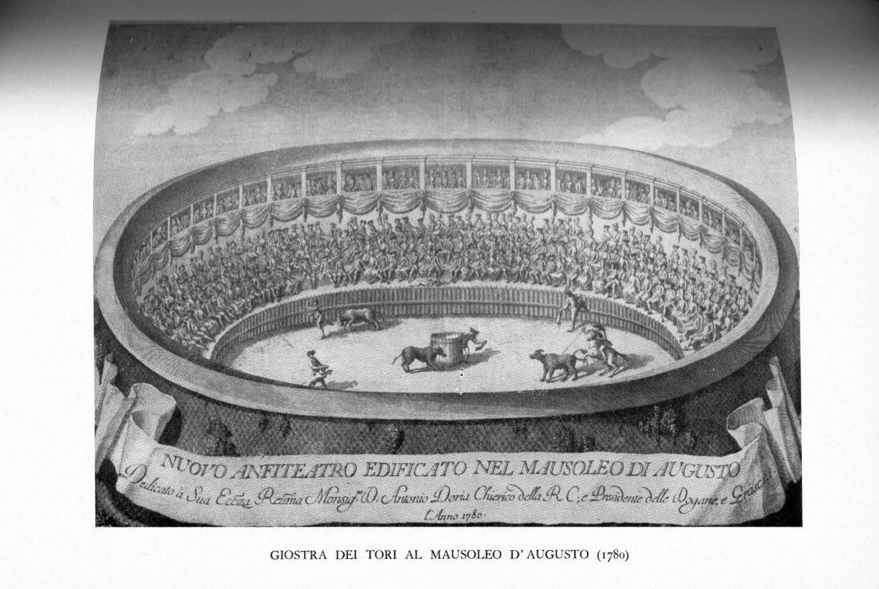
- The tournament of bulls held for the inauguration of the theatre (1780).
- Interactive map of the Anfiteatro Correa area
- Alternative names: Anfiteatro Corea; Anfiteatro Umberto I; Teatro Augusteo

General information
- Status: Demolished
- Location: Rome, Italy
- Coordinates: 41°55′N 12°29′E
- Opened: 1870
- Demolished: 1936

The Anfiteatro Correa was an amphitheatre in 1870 in Rome, Italy and was later known as the Anfiteatro Umberto I. In 1908, the theatre was transformed into a concert hall known as the Teatro Augusteo.

== History ==
The amphitheatre was built on the remains of the Mausoleum of Augustus in Campo Marzio at the behest of the Portuguese Marquis Vincenzo Mani Correa, who resided at Piazza San Lorenzo in Lucina and was the owner of a palace built against the Mausoleum as well as of the imperial ruin itself.
The name Corea came from Romanesco, which tends to elide the doubling of the consonant "r", reducing it to a single consonant. The habit ended up changing the surname of the Marquis as well, who was later called Corea: Via del Corea, located in the vicinity of the former amphitheatre, was named after him.

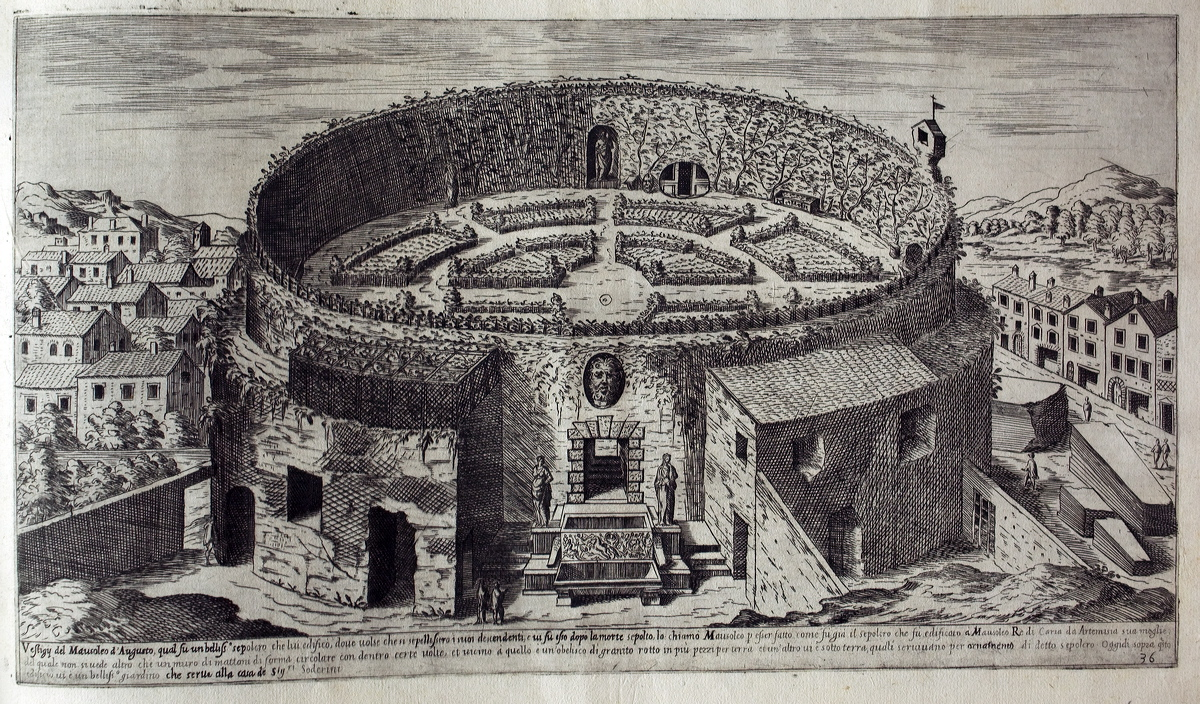
An engraving from I vestigi dell'antichita di Roma by Étienne Dupérac (1575), showing the gardens in the interior of the Mausoleum.

A garden had been created in the interior of the mausoleum a long time before. A tenant of Spanish origins named Matas equipped it with wooden scaffolding, thus creating a circular arena with bleachers intended for horse shows, tournaments with animals, hunts and fireworks (at the time called fochetti, Romanesco for "little fires"): it had a total capacity between one thousand and three thousand spectators. The inauguration took place on 3 July 1780.

In 1802 the amphitheatre was acquired by the Apostolic Camera: it allowed the performance of circus and animal shows, which have always been highly appreciated by the Roman people.

The theatre, which was located outdoors, was equipped with a velarium, built in 1826 by Giuseppe Valadier: but one afternoon in late August – fortunately before the show started – the velarium collapsed together with and on the workmen who were setting it up, one of whom, a father of five, died in the accident. The reigning Pope Leo XII wanted to personally decide an exemplary punishment for those responsible for the accident: as compensation for the widow, penalties were imposed on all the architects (1,000 scudi to Valadier and a further 500 for each to the three architects who should have supervised the execution of the work); as compensation from the Apostolic Camera, owner of the theatre, a fine of 100 scudi a year was imposed on the entrepreneur for the entire duration of the contract, to be donated to the Holy House of Santa Galla; and finally the Marquis Origo, who was the Conservatore of Rome in charge of supervising the work, was ordered to celebrate at his expense «a solemn triduum to the Madonna of Aracoeli, Advocate of the Roman people» in thanksgiving for the danger escaped by the spectators.

During the short pontificate of Pius VIII (1829–1830), both fireworks and animal and hunting shows were abolished to make room for daytime entertainment only, that is gymnastic exercises and circus performances; in 1859 the theatre was the scene of one of the first balloon flights in Rome.

After 1870, the amphitheatre was bought by Count Telfener, administrator of the assets of the Royal Family (as well as owner of Villa Ada for a time). He changed its name to Teatro Umberto I (sometimes also referred to as Anfiteatro Umberto I) in honor of the King of Italy; however, the new theatre only operated for a few years, before falling into disuse and being used as a materials yard for the construction site of the Vittoriano or as a venue for impromptu events (it is mentioned as the site of a "Wines Fair" in 1884).

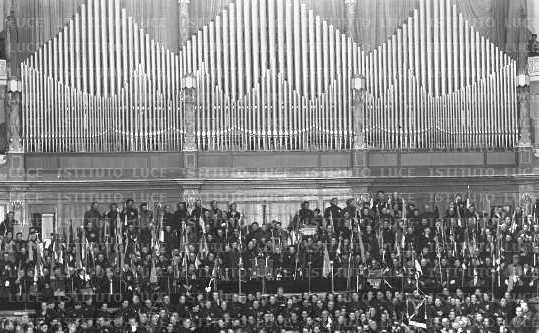
The Organ of the Teatro Augusteo, demolished in 1936.

In 1908, thanks to the efforts of the Accademia di Santa Cecilia, an intense work of refurbishment and renovation was carried out to transform the theatre into a concert hall: the new theatre took the name of Teatro Augusteo and was inaugurated on 16 February with a concert directed by Giuseppe Martucci. The symphonic concerts of the Accademia were held there until the demolitions began in 1936.

Dadaist Arthur Ciacelli's Poem for Four Voices was performed here, according to the account of Julius Evola.

== The demolition and the reorganization of the space around the mausoleum ==
The life of the theatre ended under Fascism: in 1937 the whole area once called Schiavonia (due to the presence of the church of St. Jerome of the Slavs and of some houses belonging to their congregation) was razed, as part of Mussolini's campaign of demolishment of the Renaissance urban fabric of Rome intended to isolate the remains of the imperial monuments. The area of the Mausoleum of Augustus was therefore completely rebuilt, and the monument was surrounded by the porticoed quadrilateral of Piazza Augusto Imperatore designed by the architect Vittorio Ballio Morpurgo. The clearly rationalist project provided for considerable cubages of new buildings covered in travertine, including the shrine of the Ara Pacis.

After the demolitions, the memory of the theatre remained in the toponymy of the town: the street between Via della Frezza and Piazza Augusto Imperatore still retains the name of "Via del Corea".

== See also ==
- San Girolamo dei Croati
- Mausoleum of Augustus
