= Orchestra dell'Accademia Nazionale di Santa Cecilia =

Italian symphony orchestra based in Rome

- Orchestra
- Former name: Symphony Orchestra of the Augusteo, Orchestra Stabile dell'Accademia Nazionale di Santa Cecilia
- Founded: 1908
- Location: Rome, Italy
- Concert hall: Parco della Musica
- Principal conductor: Daniel Harding
- Website: www.santacecilia.it

The Orchestra dell'Accademia Nazionale di Santa Cecilia (Orchestra of the National Academy of Santa Cecilia) is an Italian symphony orchestra based in Rome. Resident at the Parco della Musica, the orchestra primarily performs its Rome concerts in the Sala Santa Cecilia. Until 1936, it performed in the Anfiteatro Correa, which was built above the Mausoleum of Augustus.

== History ==
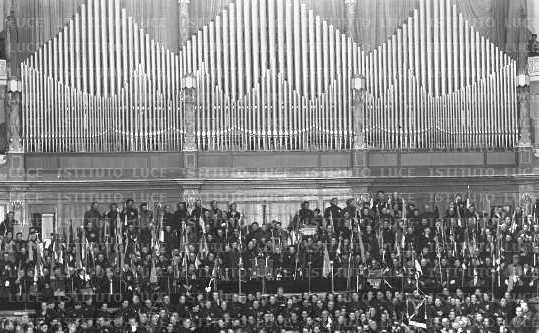
The organ of the Anfiteatro Correa

The orchestra was founded in 1908 as the first Italian orchestra to devote itself exclusively to symphonic repertoire. From 1908 to today, the Orchestra has given over 15,000 concerts collaborating with the greatest musicians or directors of the century: it has been conducted, among others, by Mahler, Debussy, Strauss, Stravinsky, Sibelius, Hindemith, Toscanini, Klemplerer Celibidache, Furtwängler, De Sabata, Stokowski, Solti, Bernstein, Karajan, Kleiber, Abbado and Morricone. Bernardino Molinari was the orchestra's first music director, serving from 1912 to 1944. Subsequent music directors included Franco Ferrara (1944–1945), Fernando Previtali (1953–1973), and Igor Markevitch (1973–1975). The orchestra was noted for its recordings of Italian opera for the Decca label with such singers such as Renata Tebaldi and Carlo Bergonzi under Tullio Serafin. Thomas Schippers had been named the next music director to succeed Markevitch, but Schippers died in December 1977 before he could formally assume the post. The music directorship of the orchestra remained vacant until 1983, with the advent of Giuseppe Sinopoli as music director. Sinopoli assisted in restoring the fortunes of the orchestra, and expanded the orchestra's repertoire to include Mahler and Bruckner. Leonard Bernstein was the honorary president of the orchestra from 1983 until 1990.

Antonio Pappano became the orchestra's music director in 2005. With Pappano, the orchestra has recorded commercially for EMI. He is scheduled to conclude his tenure as music director of the orchestra in 2023 and subsequently to take the title of conductor emeritus. Currently, Yuri Temirkanov has the title of honorary conductor of the orchestra. In March 2023, the orchestra announced the appointment of Daniel Harding as its next music director, effective with the 2024-2025 season, with an initial contract of 5 seasons.

== Music directors ==
- Bernardino Molinari (1912–1944)
- Franco Ferrara (1944–1945)
- Fernando Previtali (1953–1973)
- Igor Markevitch (1973–1975)
- Giuseppe Sinopoli (1983–1987)
- Daniele Gatti (1992–1997)
- Myung-Whun Chung (1997–2005)
- Antonio Pappano (2005–2023)
- Daniel Harding (2024-present)
