= Museum of the Ara Pacis =

Museum in Rome, Italy

- Museo dell'Ara Pacis
- Click on the map for a fullscreen view
- Established: 21 April 2006
- Location: Lungotevere in Augusta (corner of Via Tomacelli) – 00100 Rome, Italy
- Coordinates: 41°54′22″N 12°28′32″E
- Director: Claudio Parisi Presicce
- Architect: Richard Meier
- Website: www.arapacis.it

The Museum of the Ara Pacis (Italian: Museo dell'Ara Pacis) belongs to the Sistema dei Musei in Comune of Rome (Italy); it houses the Ara Pacis of Augustus, an ancient monument that was initially inaugurated on 30 January 9 B.C.

== Structure ==
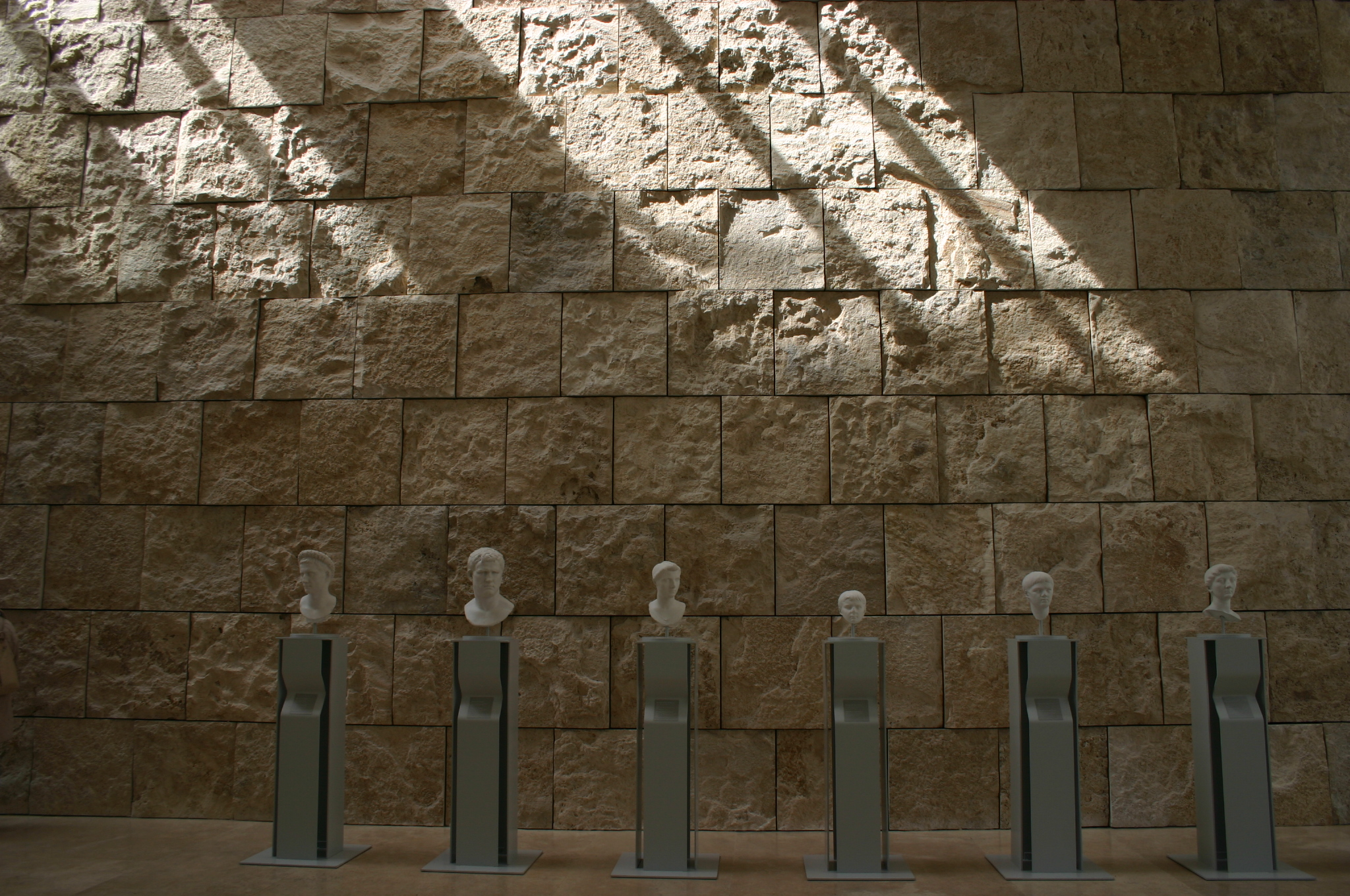
The portraits of the Julio-Claudian dynasty placed close to the entry

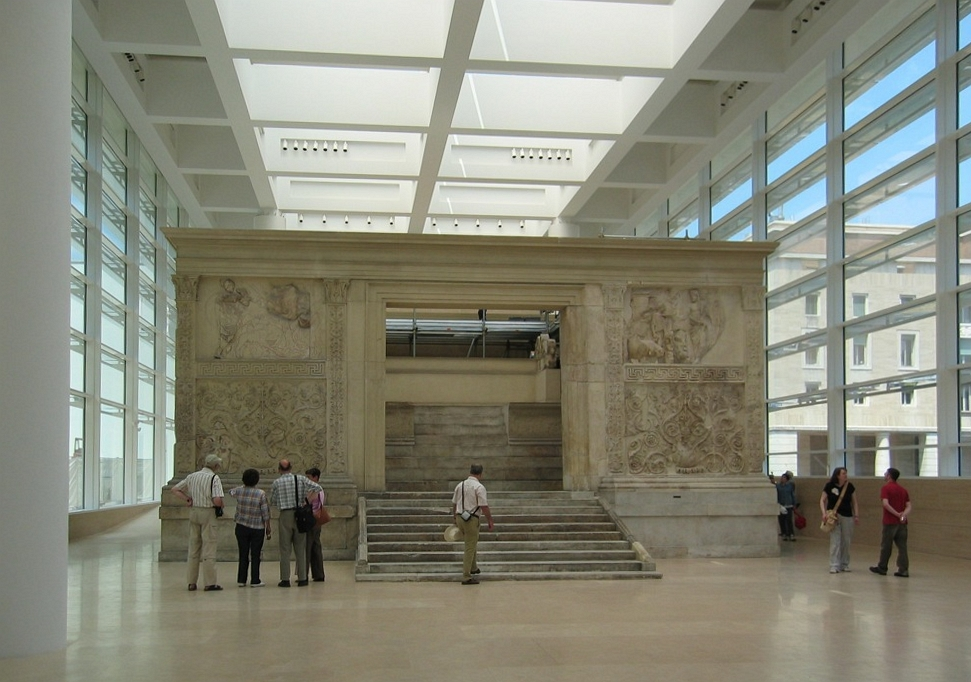
The Ara Pacis inside the museum

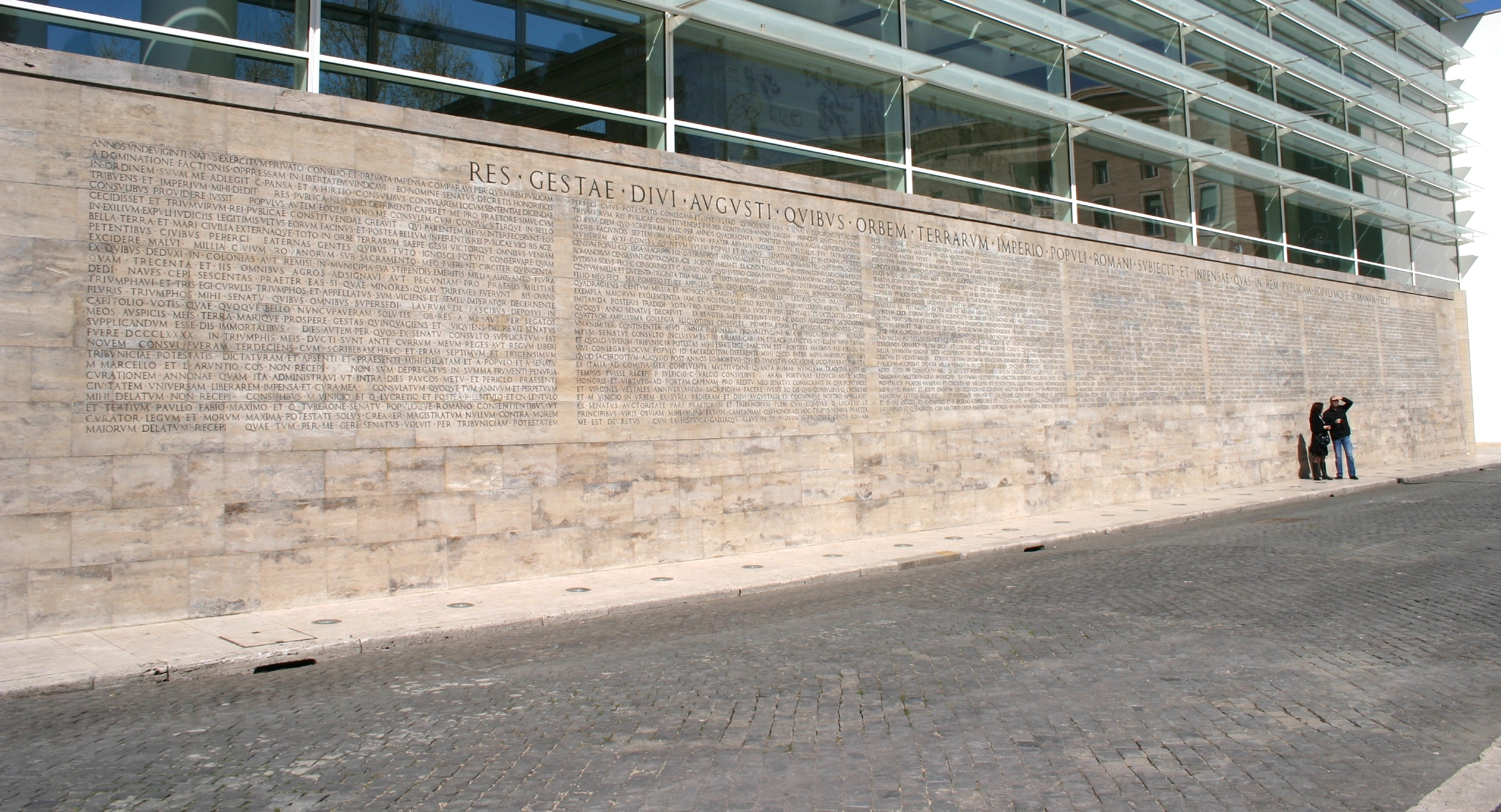
The fascist-era copy of the Res Gestae Divi Augusti, placed on the back of the museum

Designed by the American architect Richard Meier and built in steel, travertine, glass and plaster, the museum is the first major architectural and urban intervention in the historic centre of Rome since the Fascist era. It is a structure with typical modernist features, composed of rigidly geometric shapes and with plain surfaces. Wide glazed surfaces and skylights allow the light to penetrate the central pavilion.

The white color is a hallmark of Richard Meier's work, while the travertine plates decorating part of the building reflect design changes (aluminium surfaces were initially planned), resulting from a modification following criticism on the visual impact of the structure on the surrounding urban landscape.

The complex was initially intended to include a pedestrian path, allowing a direct connection to the Tiber river via an underpass, which was however never built.

== History ==
The museum's first building was designed by architect Vittorio Ballio Morpurgo and completed in 1938, during the Fascist era, as part of Mussolini's reconfiguration of Piazza Augusto Imperatore. This location was chosen for the museum due to its proximity to the Mausoleum of Augustus and the newly built surrounding rationalist architecture.

In 1996 the then mayor of Rome, Francesco Rutelli, entrusted the American architect Richard Meier with the construction of a new museum, without any architectural competition. Morpurgo's building was demolished and the current building opened to the public, after seven years of works, on 21 April 2006 (the anniversary of the traditional date of the foundation of Rome).

During the night of 31 May 2009, unknown persons defaced the white outer wall with green and red paint and placed a toilet bowl at the foot of the wall.

On 12 December 2009, a group of activists of Earth First!, during the Copenhagen Summit, colored the water of the fountain green and affixed on the side facing Via Tomacelli a banner saying "Earth First! Act Now". The officers and the employees of the museum intervened immediately, removing the banner and emptying the fountain.

== Reception and criticism ==
The building has attracted conflicting opinions. The New York Times judged it a flop, "a contemporary expression of what can happen when an architect fetishizes his own style out of a sense of self-aggrandizement. Absurdly overscale, it seems indifferent to the naked beauty of the dense and richly textured city around it." The building also attracted criticism by architects such as Massimiliano Fuksas and Paolo Portoghesi. Archeologist Adriano La Regina criticized it for the absence of the necessary protection screens from direct sunlight and for reducing "the Ara Pacis into the pretext for the building, rather than the other way around". The Italian art critic and polemicist Vittorio Sgarbi called it "A Texas gas station in the very earth of one of the most important urban centres in the world".

However, some have defended Meier's project, such as art critic Achille Bonito Oliva.

In November 2013 the faulty roof allowed water to leak into the building during heavy rain. Staff members had to use buckets to remove water from the top of the altar.

During one of his first declarations after being elected Mayor of Rome in April 2008, Gianni Alemanno announced his intention to remove Meier's building. However, Alemanno himself later pointed out that the removal was not a priority of his administration.

== Bibliography ==
- Sebastiano Brandolini. 2008. Rome: new architecture. Milan: Skira. ISBN 9788861305342.
- Federico Del Prete. 2006. Ara Pacis. Rome: Punctum. ISBN 9788889412213.
- Maria José Strazzulla. 2009. "War and Peace: Housing the Ara Pacis in the Eternal City." American Journal of Archaeology 113.2 (open access)

Preceded by Museum of Roman Civilization	Landmarks of Rome; Museum of the Ara Pacis	Succeeded by Museum of the Liberation of Rome
