= Lungotevere dei Mellini =

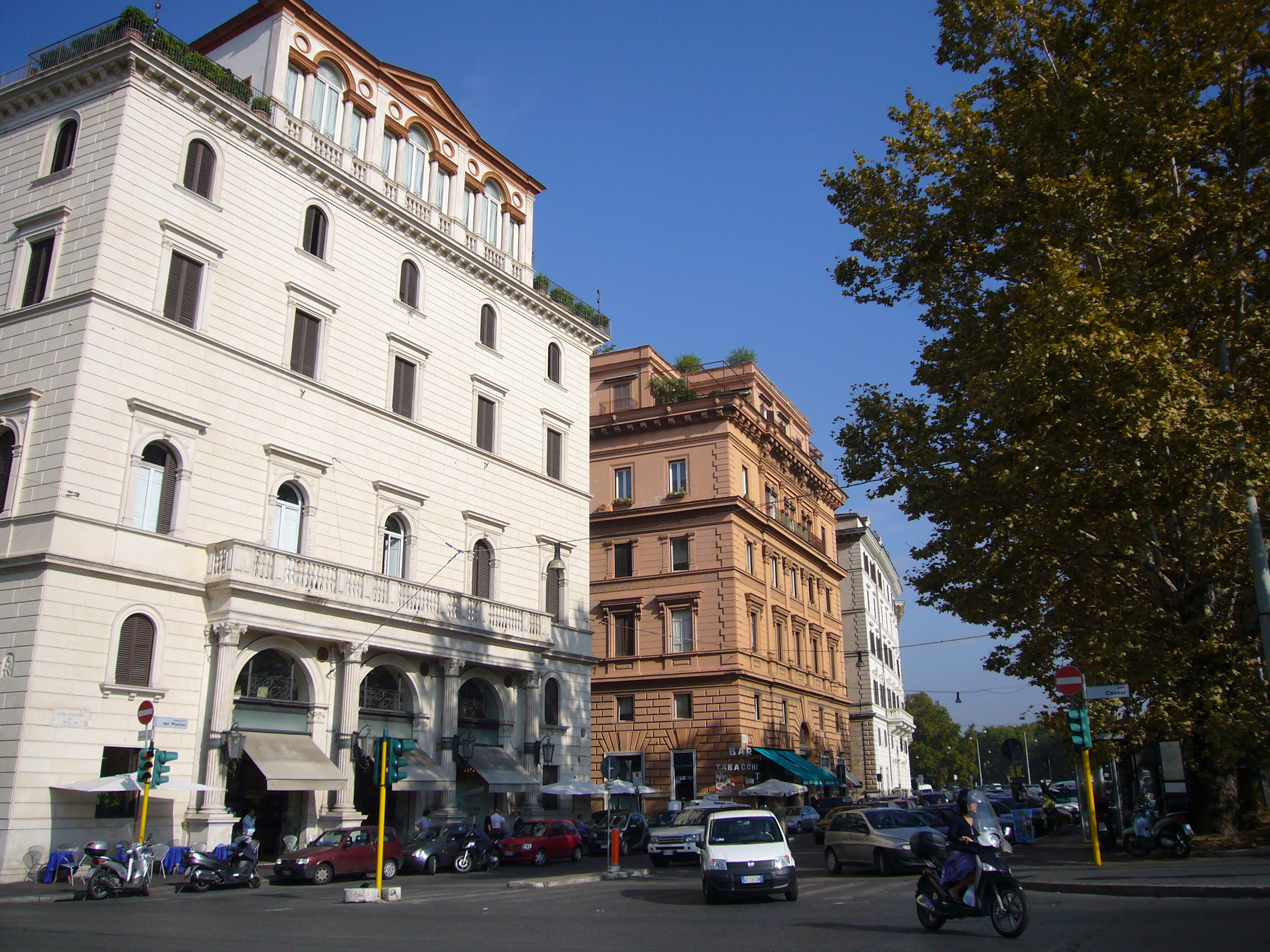
- Interactive map of Lungotevere dei Mellini
- Namesake: The Mellini (or Millini) family
- Type: Lungotevere
- Location: Rome, Italy
- Quarter: Prati
- Coordinates: 41.9075°N 12.4728°E
- From: Via Vittoria Colonna
- To: Piazza della Libertà

Construction
- Inauguration: July 20, 1887

The Lungotevere dei Mellini is the stretch of Lungotevere that links Via Vittoria Colonna to Piazza della Libertà, in the rione Prati in Rome (Italy).

The Lungotevere takes its name from the Mellini (or Millini) family, which owned a house in the rione Monti and another in Piazza Navona; it was established as per resolution dated July 20, 1887.

From the Lungotevere is it possible to observe the back façade of Palazzo Blumenstihl, easily recognizable for the big arches in the ground floor and for the turret. The palace rises in the same place of the former Teatro Alhambra, built in 1880 and destroyed by a fire in 1902; the theatre, interely made of wood, was very popular for its Opera performances. Since 1992 Palazzo Blumenstihl houses the Polish Institute in Rome.

== Bibliografia ==
- Rendina, Claudio; Paradisi, Donatella (2004). Le strade di Roma. Volume secondo E-O. Rome: Newton Compton Editori. ISBN 88-541-0209-1.
