= Lungotevere Michelangelo =

Coordinates: 41°54′N 12°28′E

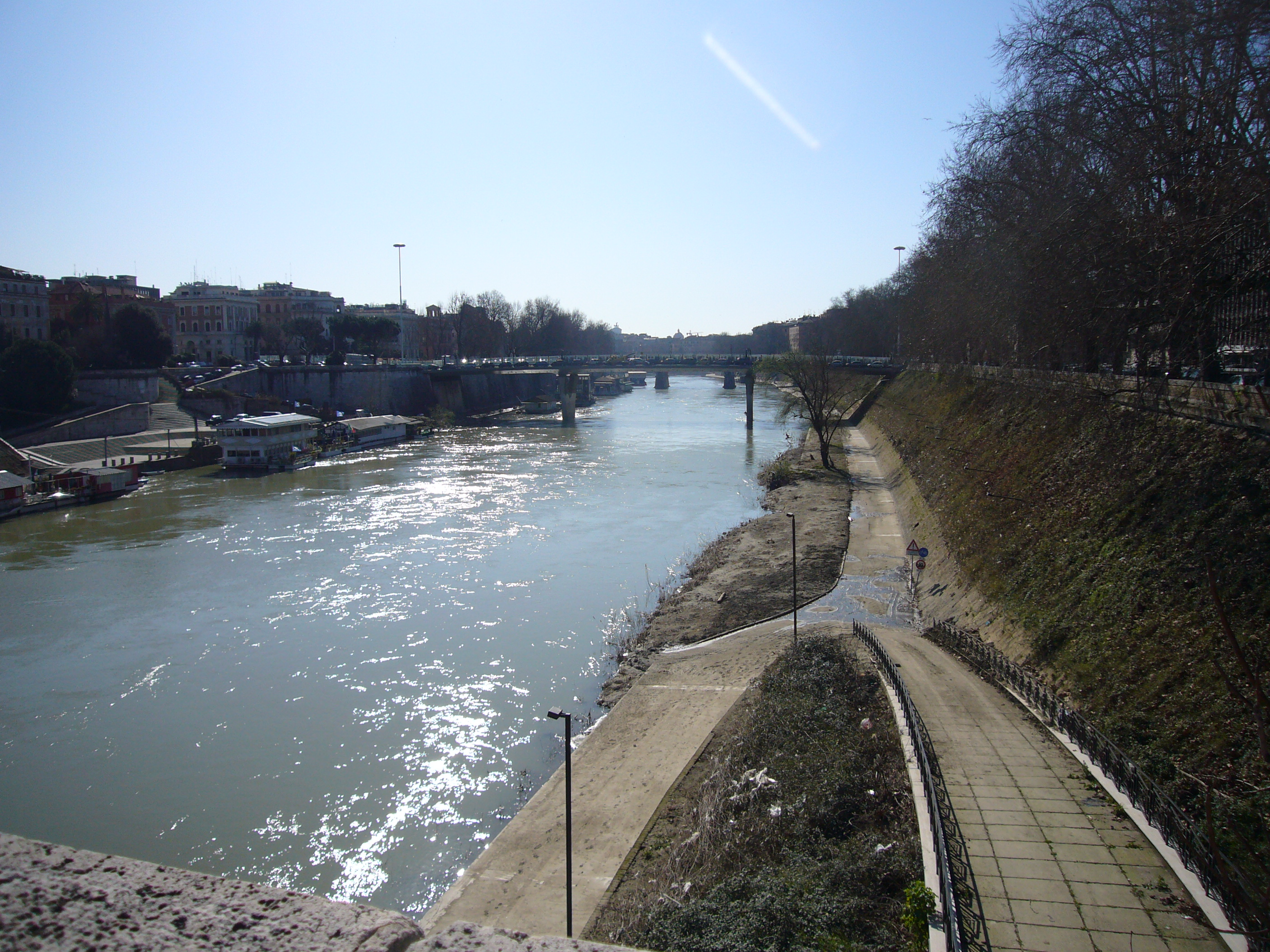
Lungotevere Michelangelo and Ponte Nenni

Lungotevere Michelangelo is the stretch of Lungotevere that links Piazza della Libertà to Piazza delle Cinque Giornate in Rome, in the Rione Prati.

The Lungotevere is dedicated to Michelangelo Buonarroti, who created several works of art in the town; it was established as per resolution on April 1, 1911.

The boulevard is delimited by Ponte Giacomo Matteotti and Ponte Regina Margherita, while in an intermediate position rises Ponte Pietro Nenni, that is used by the trains of the Line A of the Rome Metro.

== Sources ==
- Rendina, Claudio; Paradisi, Donatella. Le strade di Roma. 2nd volume E-O (2004 ed.). Newton Compton Editori, Rome. ISBN 88-541-0209-1.
