= Piazza della Libertà =

Piazza della Libertà, meaning "Freedom/Liberty Square", may refer to the following places in Italy:

- Piazza della Libertà, Florence
- Piazza della Libertà, Rome
- Piazza della Libertà, San Marino
- Piazza Libertà, Udine, also known as Piazza della Libertà
- A piazza in Bagnacavallo, Ravenna, Emilia-Romagna
- A piazza in Civitanova Marche, Macerata, Marche
- A piazza in Macerata, Macerata, Marche
- A piazza in Sorbolo, Parma, Emilia-Romagna
