= Lungotevere in Augusta =

Street in Rome

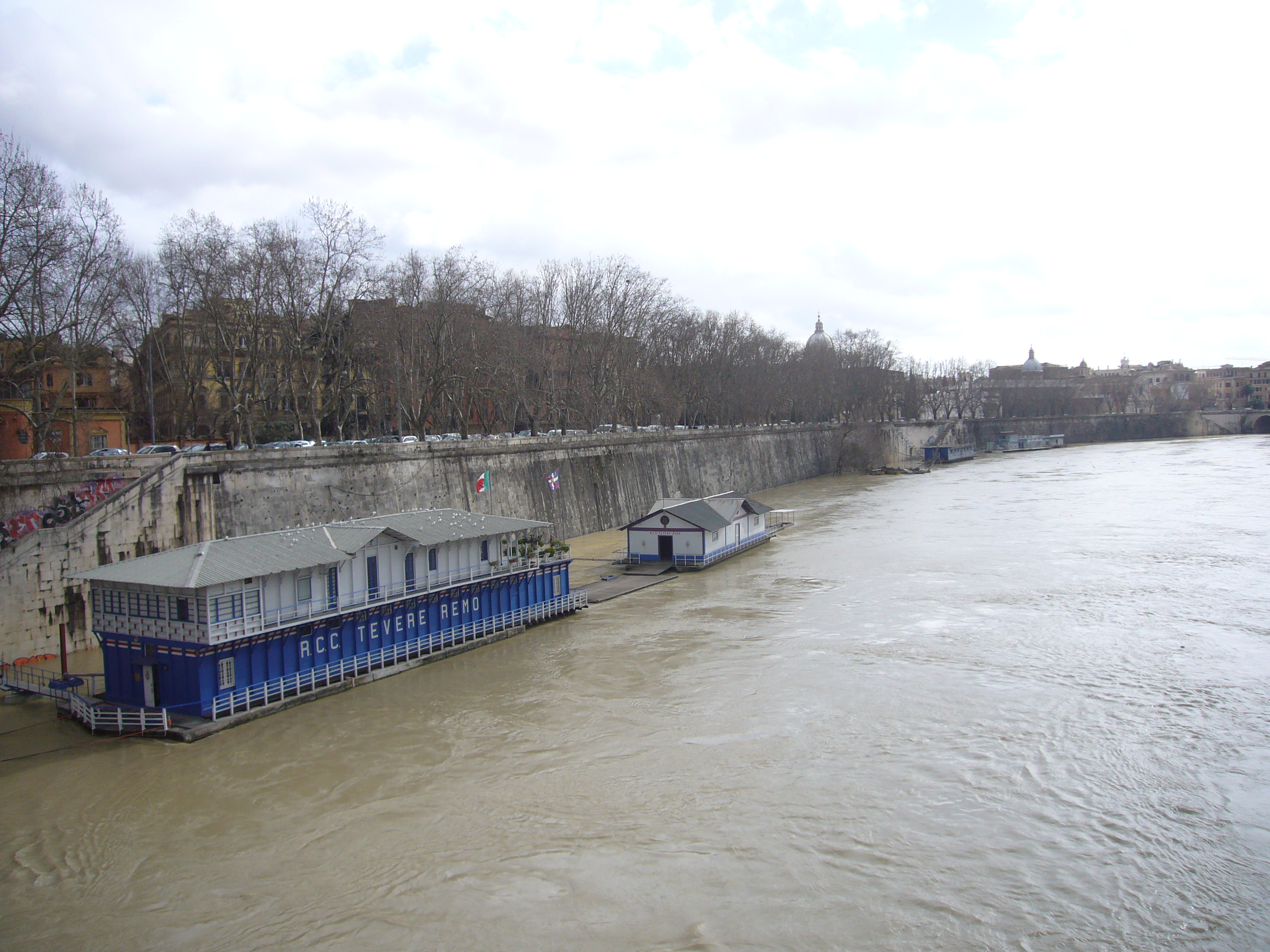
Lungotevere in Augusta. On the left, the seat of the "Reale Circolo Canottieri Tevere Remo"

The Lungotevere in Augusta is the stretch of lungotevere linking Piazza del Porto di Ripetta to Ponte Regina Margherita in Rome, in the rione Campo Marzio.

The Lungotevere is named after the Mausoleum of Augustus (in Piazza Augusto Imperatore), next to which the Ara Pacis Augustae is placed. Many churches, now missing, rose in the area, like San Biagio de Penna, Santa Marina in Augusta and San Tommaso de Vineis.

In 1959, the bronze monument dedicated to the patriot Angelo Brunetti (called Ciceruacchio) - created by Ettore Ximenes in 1907 and formerly placed in Lungotevere Arnaldo da Brescia - was hauled to the gardens between the Lungotevere and the Ripetta Promenade.

== Sources ==
- Rendina, Claudio; Paradisi, Donatella. Le strade di Roma. 1st volume A-D (2004 ed.). Newton Compton Editori, Rome. ISBN 88-541-0208-3.
