= Ponte Pietro Nenni =

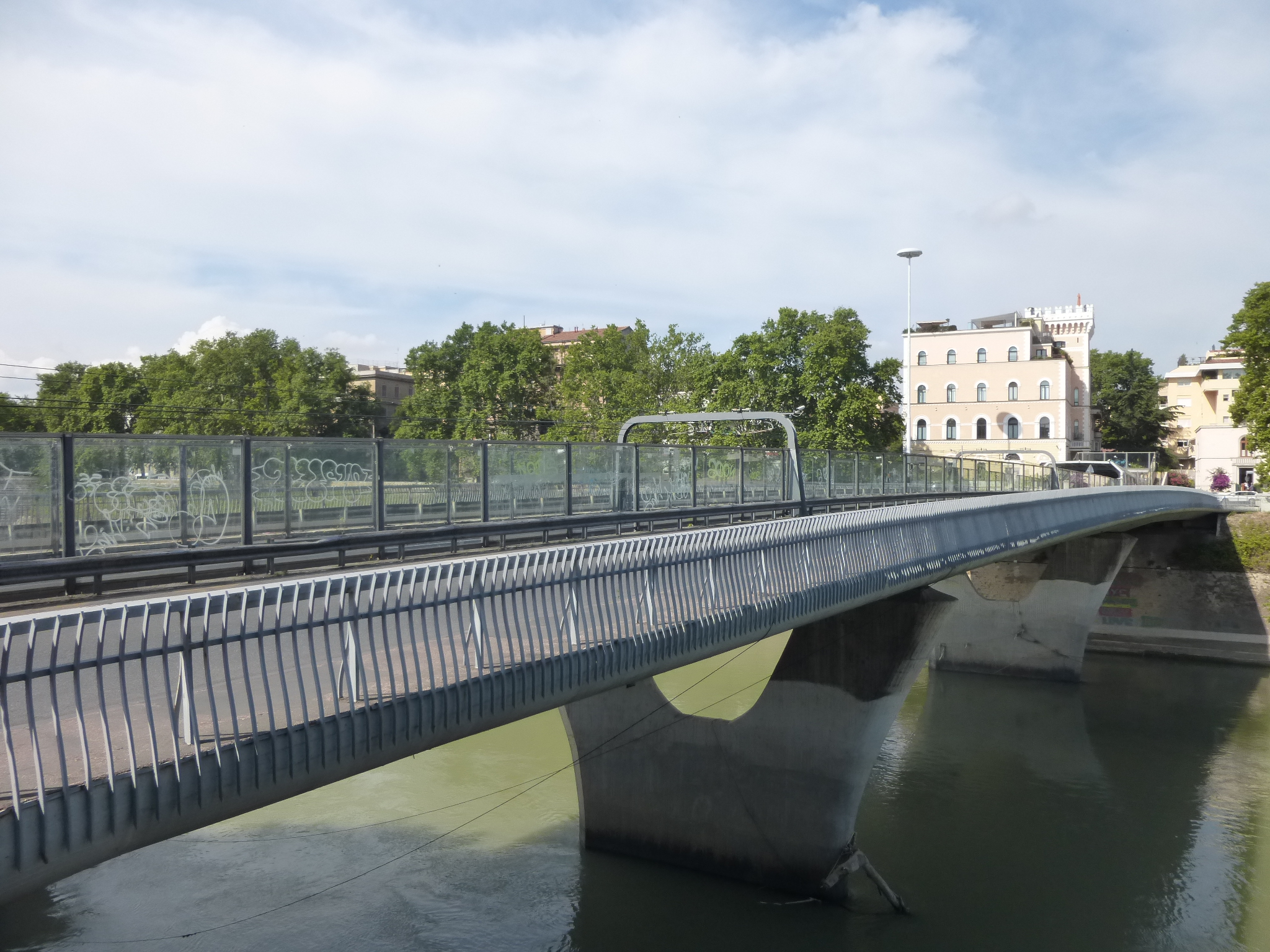
- Coordinates: 41°54′43″N 12°28′17″E
- Crosses: River Tiber
- Locale: Rome, Flaminio and Prati Quarters, Italy
- Official name: Ponte Pietro Nenni

Characteristics
- Material: Reinforced concrete
- Total length: 121.6 m (399.0 ft)
- Width: 25.4 m (83.3 ft)

History
- Designer: Luigi Moretti, Silvano Zorzi
- Construction start: 1969
- Construction end: 1972

Location
- Interactive map of Ponte Pietro Nenni

Ponte Pietro Nenni (Italian: "Pietro Nenni bridge") is a bridge crossing the Tiber in Rome, which connects lungotevere Arnaldo da Brescia and lungotevere Michelangelo, in the Quarter Flaminio and Rione Prati respectively.

The bridge, designed by Architect Luigi Moretti and Engineer Silvano Zorzi, was built between 1969 and 1972 and inaugurated in 1980; it was dedicated to Pietro Nenni, socialist leader who had died a month before the inauguration. It is also commonly known as the "Metro bridge", since it serves the Line A of the Rome Metro, of which it is the only above-ground stretch: the railway track emerges at Via Cesare Beccaria and descends below the road surface on the opposite bank, between Viale Giulio Cesare and Via degli Scipioni. On both sides of the tracks there are vehicular traffic lanes.

The bridge spreads over three spans made of prestressed concrete, for a total length of about 121 meters (399 ft).

== Bibliography ==
- Rendina, Claudio (2005). Enciclopedia di Roma. Rome: Newton Compton Editori. ISBN 88-541-0304-7.
- Tullia Iori, L'ultimo ponte sul Tevere, in "Casabella", year LXX nr. 1, number 739/740 (dec. 2005/ jan. 2006), pp. 20–25.
