= Monument to Giacomo Matteotti, Rome =

Coordinates: 41°54′47″N 12°28′19″E

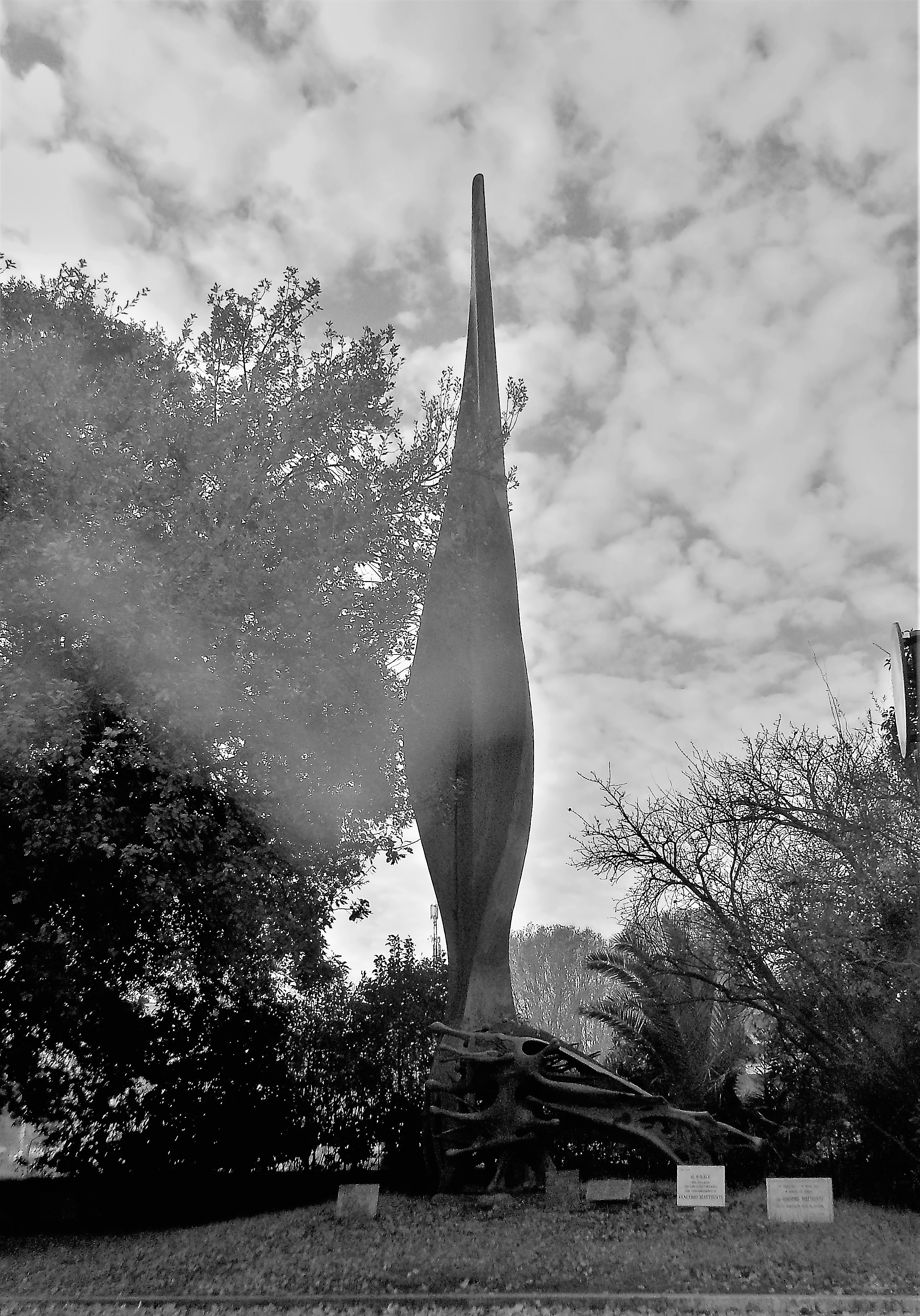
- Interactive map of Monument to Giacomo Matteotti, Rome
- Location: Rome, Italy
- Designer: Jorio Vivarelli
- Type: Statue
- Material: Bronze
- Dedicated date: 1974
- Dedicated to: Giacomo Matteotti

The Monument to Giacomo Matteotti is an abstract sculpture, meant to memorialize this anti-fascist politician, murdered on 10 June 1924 as he walked near this spot on Lungotevere Arnaldo da Brescia, near the Ponte Pietro Nenni, in Rome, Italy.

== History and description ==
Giacomo Matteotti (born 1885) was a deputy in the parliament, a prominent member of the Unitary Socialist party, elected in Rovigo. On 30 May 1924, he rose to criticize the violence occurring recent elections, the antidemocratic legislation (Acerbo law) which assigned two-thirds of the parliamentary seats to the party with the most votes (Mussolini's party was the largest party with 35% of the vote); during next days on English press he joined to critics against fascist officials supposed to have received bribes from Sinclair Oil company. He knew his speech could incite violence against his person. While he was walking towards the parliament, on 10 June 1924, he was waylaid by five men and sequestered into a Lancia Lambda and stabbed several times. Among the five was a prominent member of the Fascist secret police. It has never been clear whether or not prominent fascist leaders, such a Mussolini or his circle, approved or ordered the murder.

The monument is situated beside the Lungotevere, on a small semicircular green plot, built as a terrace above a series of stairs leading to the Tiber riverbank. It was inaugurated in 1974, fifty years after his murder. The sculptor is Jorio Vivarelli (1922-2008): the bronze memorial has two parts: one a tall slender spire, resembling an unopened flower, or pistol, or lance-leaf shape, or a flame Along the ground is a tangle of organic forms, compared to roots or a bramble or a knot of bones. Towards the street is a plaque with the above noted phrase from his last speech.

The sculpture was funded by a private fund-raising effort by the socialist party. The sculptor putatively entitled the monument as The idea, the death, inspired by the famous phrase attributed to Matteotti.

In a letter to the Giacomo Matteotti Foundation, the sculptor indicated the horizontal element ... through the exasperation of form and matter, wants to signify maceration and physical destruction, understood in a universal sense, in a tragic moment in history. The vertical element signifies the ideal ascending towards space, through a sprouting, pure, lyrical form, a symbol of clarity and hope. Vivarelli himself, as a former Italian soldier, had been imprisoned and deported north by the Nazi forces in 1943.

== Plaques ==
In January 2017, the original plaque in memory of Giacomo Matteotti - which includes the line "Although you can kill me, the idea within me can never be killed" - was smashed; same desecration happened in July 2025.
