= Old church of Santa Galla (Rome) =

Chiesa di Santa Galla
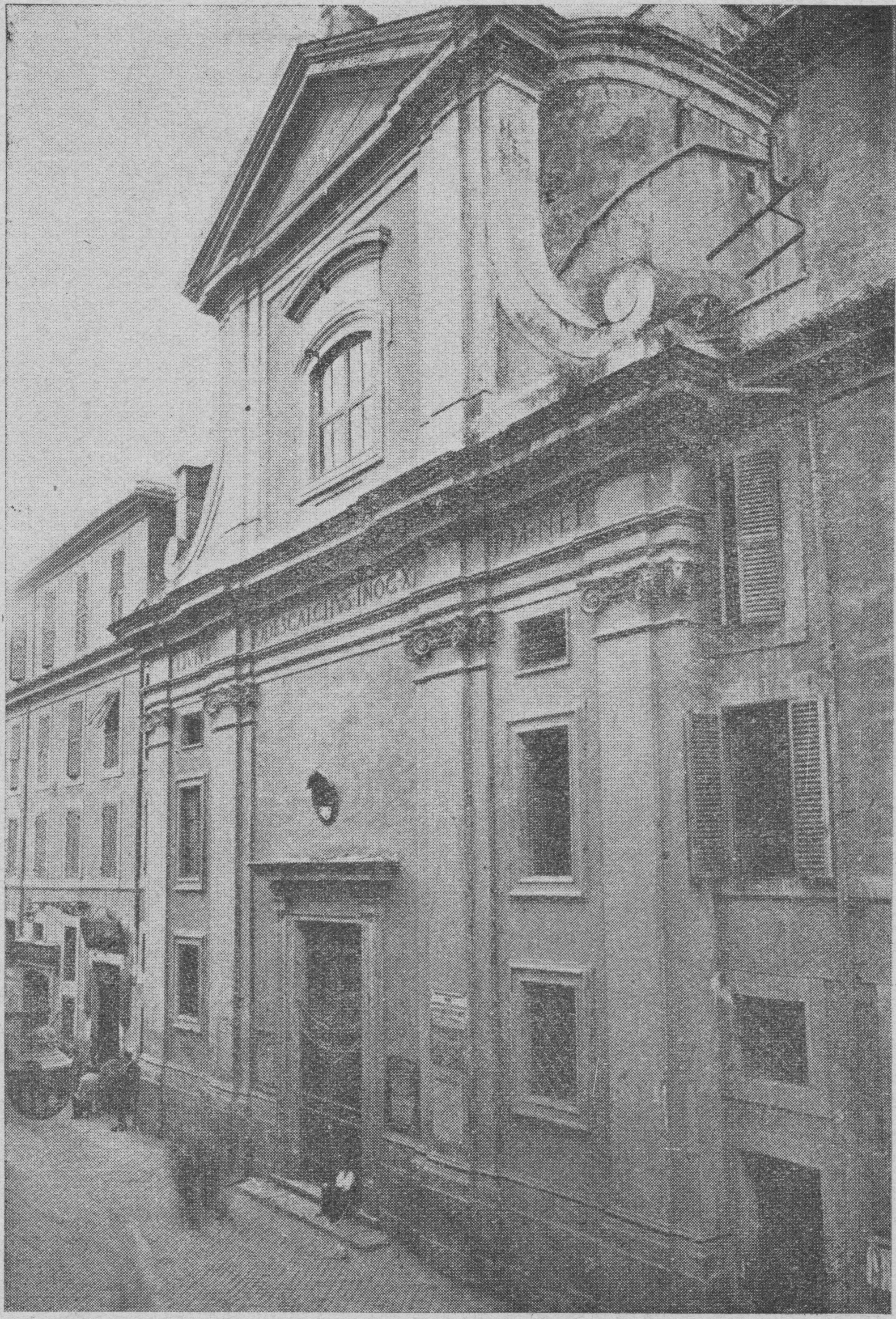
- Facade of the church (before 1930)
- Chiesa di Santa Galla
- Location: Rome
- Country: ITA
- Denomination: Catholic, Roman Rite

History
- Status: Demolished
- Dedication: Saint Galla

Architecture
- Groundbreaking: 6th century
- Demolished: 1928–1930

Administration
- Diocese: Rome

The Old church of Santa Galla was a church in Rome, Italy, in the Rione Ripa, on the road that connected Piazza Montanara with Piazza della Bocca della Verità. Both the church and the square in front of it were destroyed between 1928 and 1930 for the construction of the first stretch of Via del Mare (now Via del Teatro di Marcello); the furnishings and the altar were relocated to the new church of Santa Galla at Garbatella, built in 1940.

== History ==
According to tradition, the church was built on the house of the patrician Galla, daughter of Symmachus, as a place for displaying a miraculous image of the Madonna. Antonio Nibby reports as follows:

It is a pious tradition that in this place there was the former paternal home of St. Galla, Roman matron daughter of Symmachus, a consular man whose death tarnished the last years of King Theodoric: there the Saint devoted herself every day to works of Christian piety giving food to twelve poor people, so that, according to the same legend, the sacred image of the Virgin appeared to her: such image today is venerated in the church of Campitelli, where it was transferred under Alexander VII. In honor of that image a church was built in this same place, to which St. Galla left all her possessions after entering a monastery.

— Nibby, op. cit., p. 222

The church took the name of Santa Maria in Portico from the nearby porticoes and maybe from the ruins of those of the foundress's own house, known as Porticus Gallatorum during the Middle Ages. Gregory the Great, very devoted both to St. Galla and to the image that was venerated in that church, declared the church itself a cardinal deanery. In the Middle Ages, Gregory VII rebuilt it again and consecrated it on July 8, 1073.

When a terrible plague raged on Rome in 1656, many inhabitants commended themselves to the protection of the Madonna of Santa Maria in Portico, for which a better location was consequently decided. Alexander VII decreed to transfer the image of the Madonna and the cardinal title from Santa Maria in Portico to the nearby church of Santa Maria in Campitelli; at the same time the old church of Santa Maria in Portico received the new name of Santa Galla, and a workhouse was built next to it. The translation of the image took place on January 14, 1662.
The church of Santa Galla was rebuilt again at the expense of Livio Odescalchi, to a design by Mattia de Rossi: the poor were transferred to the charitable institution of the Odescalchi family, the hospice of San Michele a Ripa.

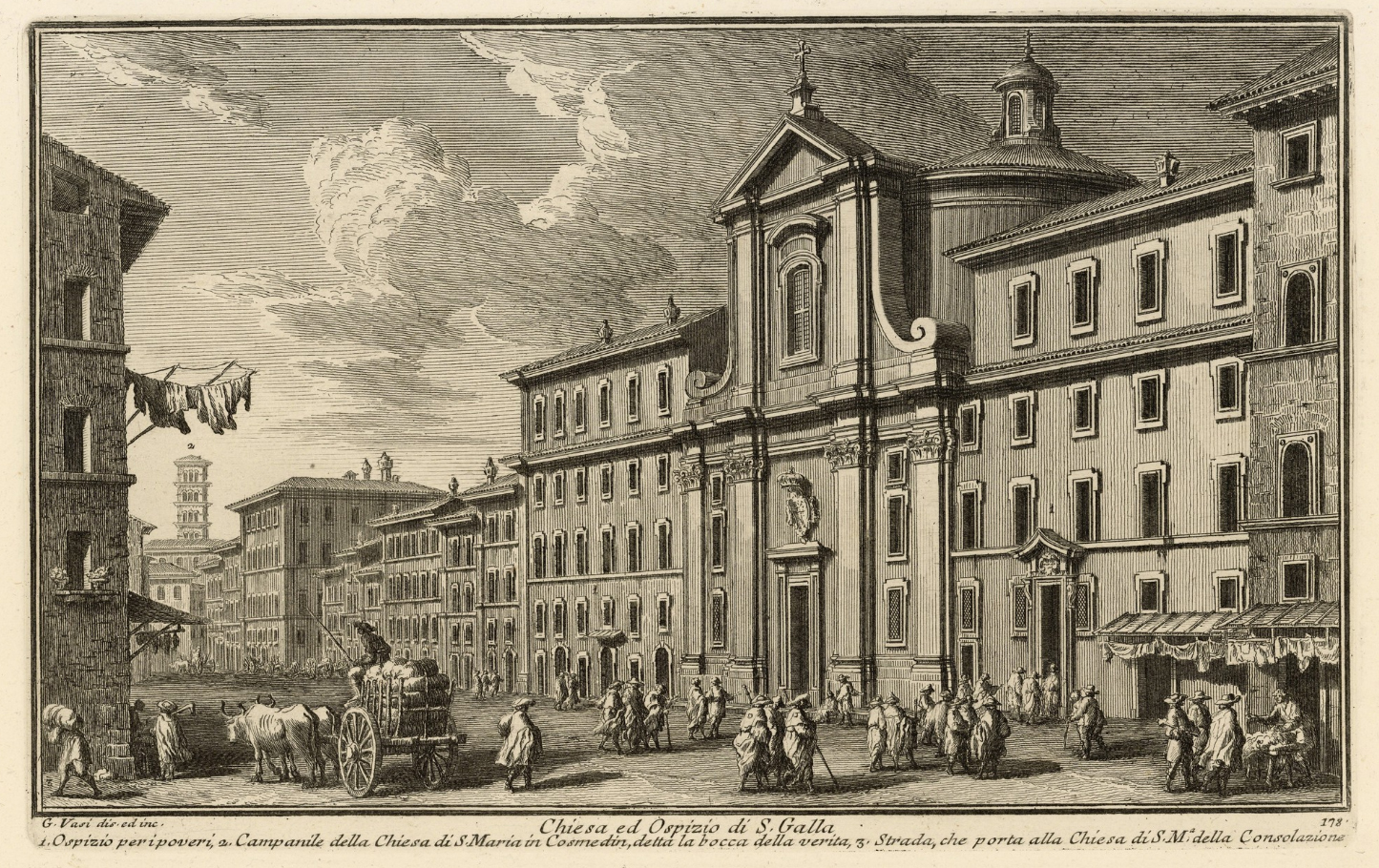
An engraving by Giuseppe Vasi showing the Hospice of Santa Galla with the belltower of Santa Maria in Cosmedin in the background (1759)

The interior of the church preserved two Angels in adoration of the Blessed Sacrament in plaster, created by Gian Lorenzo Bernini as models for the metal ones in the chapel of the Blessed Sacrament at St. Peter in the Vatican; in addition, an ancient Roman ara converted into a Catholic altar and a painting of St. Galla receiving the image of the Madonna del Portico, today both in the modern Church of Santa Galla at Garbatella.

== Bibliography ==
- Nibby, Antonio (1839). "Antonio Nibby, Roma nell'anno MDCCCXXXVIII, Parte prima moderna, Rome 1839, p. 222-223".
- "M. Armellini, Le chiese di Roma dal secolo IV al XIX, Rome 1891".
- Claudio Rendina (2000). Le Chiese di Roma. Rome: Newton & Compton Editori. ISBN 978-88-541-1833-1.
- Alberto Manodori (2000). "Rione XII Ripa". I rioni di Roma. Vol. II. Rome: Newton & Compton Editori. pp. 766–830.
