= Ponte Regina Margherita =

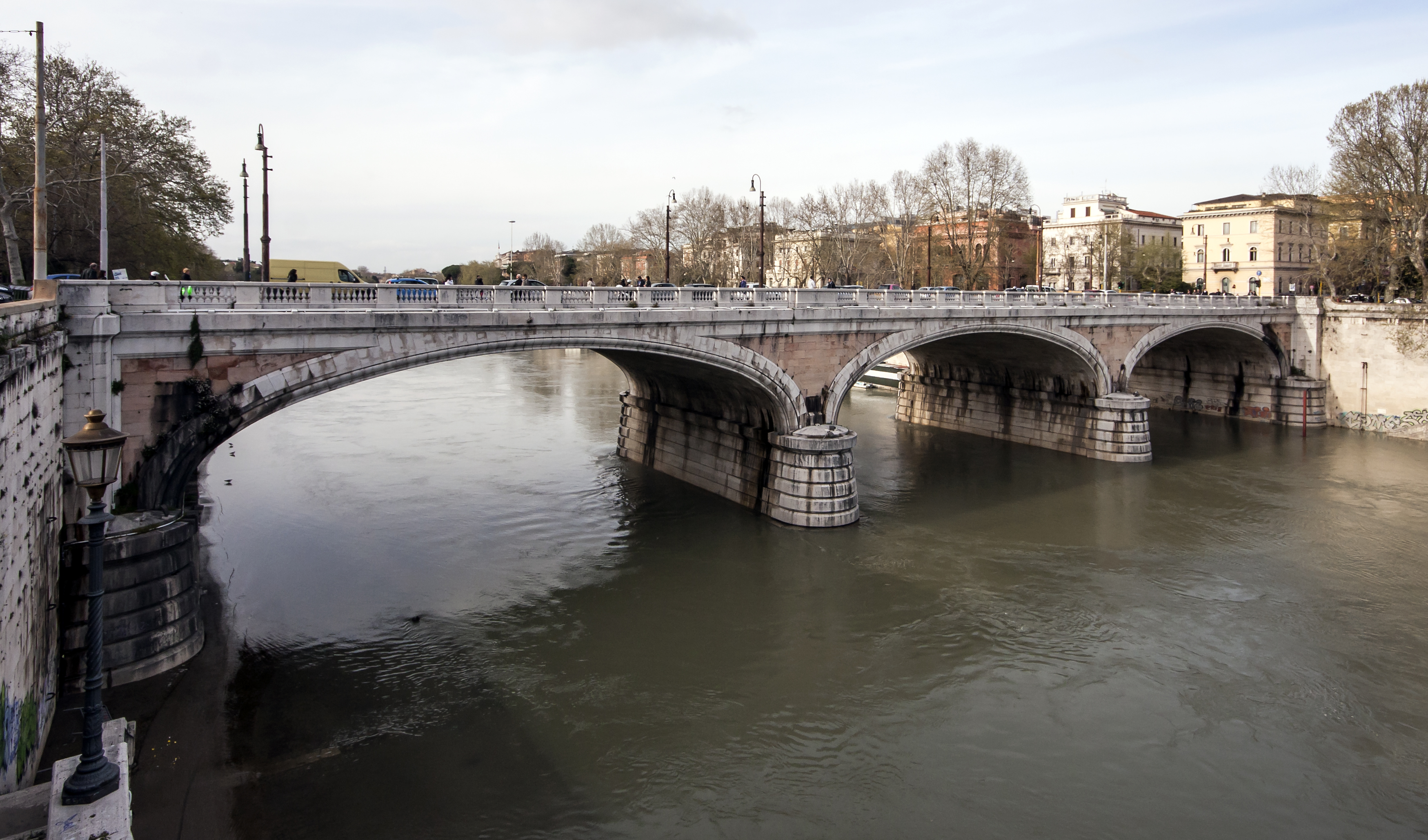
- Coordinates: 41°54′35″N 12°28′21″E
- Crosses: River Tiber
- Locale: Rome, Campo Marzio and Prati Quarters, Italy

Characteristics
- Material: Masonry and travertine
- Total length: 110 m (360.9 ft)

History
- Designer: Angelo Vescovali
- Construction start: 1886
- Construction end: 1891
- Opened: 1891

Location
- Interactive map of Ponte Regina Margherita

Ponte Regina Margherita (Italian for Queen Margherita Bridge), also known as Ponte Margherita, is a bridge linking Piazza della Libertà to Lungotevere Arnaldo da Brescia, in the rioni Campo Marzio and Prati in Rome, Italy.

== Description ==
The bridge was designed by architect Angelo Vescovali and built between 1886 and 1891; it was dedicated to Margherita of Savoy, first Queen of Italy (1861–1946). The bridge serves as a direct connection between rione Prati and Piazza del Popolo; it was the first masonry bridge built over the Tiber in many centuries.

It shows three masonry arches tiled with travertine and is about 110 meters long.

== Bibliography ==
- Ravaglioli, Armando (1997). Roma anno 2750 ab Urbe condita. Storia, monumenti, personaggi, prospettive. Rome: Tascabili Economici Newton. ISBN 88-8183-670-X.
- Rendina, Claudio (2005). Enciclopedia di Roma. Rome: Newton Compton Editori. ISBN 88-541-0304-7.
