= Lungotevere Arnaldo da Brescia =

Street in Rome

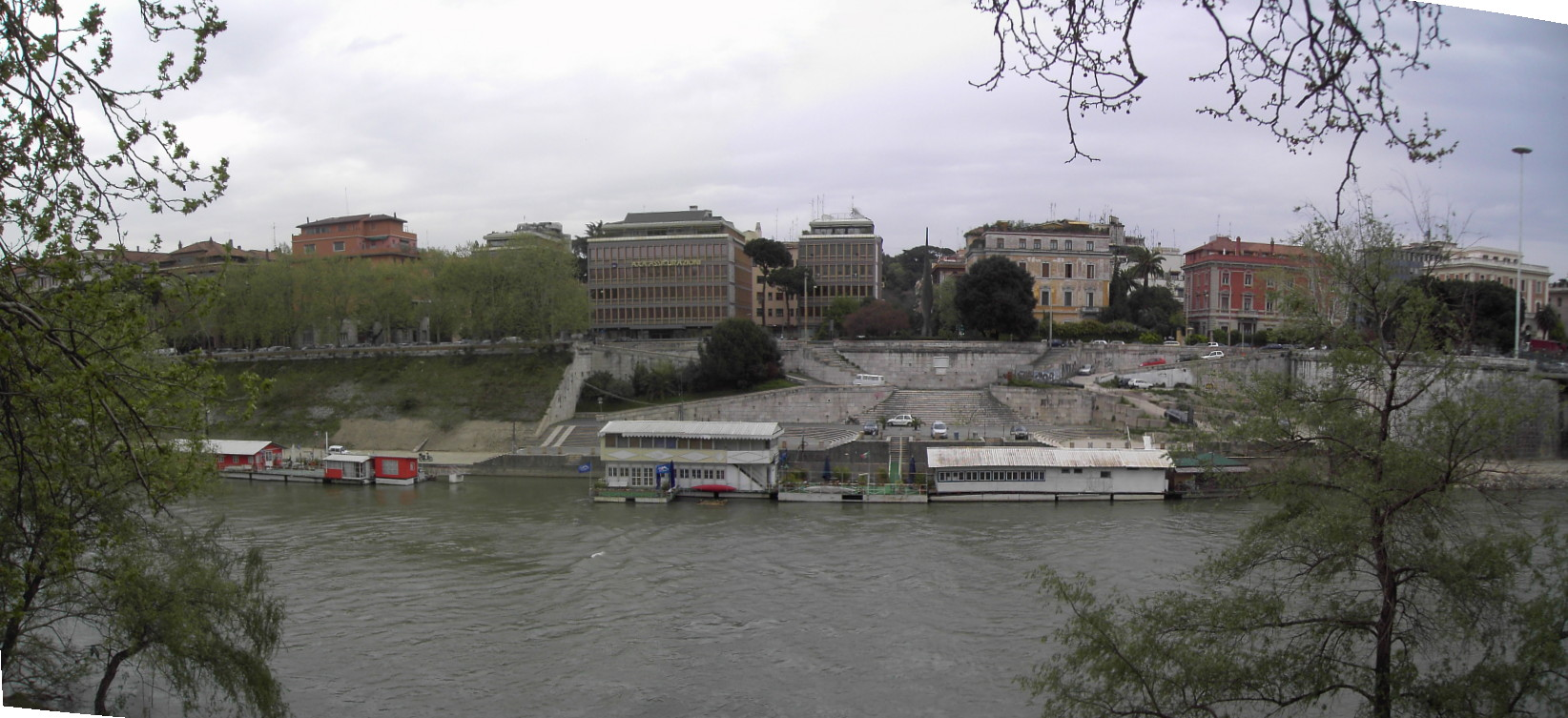
- Interactive map of Lungotevere Arnaldo da Brescia
- Namesake: Arnaldo da Brescia
- Type: Lungotevere
- Location: Campo Marzio and Flaminio, Rome, Italy
- From: Via Ferdinando di Savoia
- To: Ponte Matteotti

Other
- Known for: Monument to Giacomo Matteotti, Francesco de Pinedo port

Lungotevere Arnaldo da Brescia is the stretch of the Lungotevere that connects via Ferdinando di Savoia to ponte Matteotti, in Rome, in rione Campo Marzio and the Flaminio quarter.

== Monuments ==
The Lungotevere is dedicated to Arnaldo da Brescia, the excommunicated monk hanged for heresy in 1155. On the Lungotevere in 1974 was erected a bronze monument in memory of the assassination of Giacomo Matteotti, Socialist deputy kidnapped by the fascists in 1924 in this place. The work was carried out by Iorio Vivarelli.

On the Lungotevere lay also another monument, dedicated to the patriot Angelo Brunetti (Ciceruacchio), moved elsewhere in 1959 during the construction of vehicular underpasses between the Passeggiata di Ripetta and Lungotevere in Augusta.

Near the Lungotevere was built a port, dedicated to Francesco de Pinedo, along the lines of the porto di Ripetta, destroyed in the late nineteenth century. One can access the airport from the Lungotevere via a series of ramps and stairways. In this stretch of the river the Neapolitan aviator had ditched on 7 November 1925 by his seaplane Gennariello, after a transcontinental flight.

== Sources ==
- Rendina, Claudio; Paradisi, Donatella (2004). Le strade di Roma. 1st volume A-D. Newton Compton Editori, Rome. ISBN 88-541-0208-3.
