= Ara Pacis =

Ancient Roman religious monument in Rome, Italy

Altar of Augustan Peace
- Ara Pacis Augustae
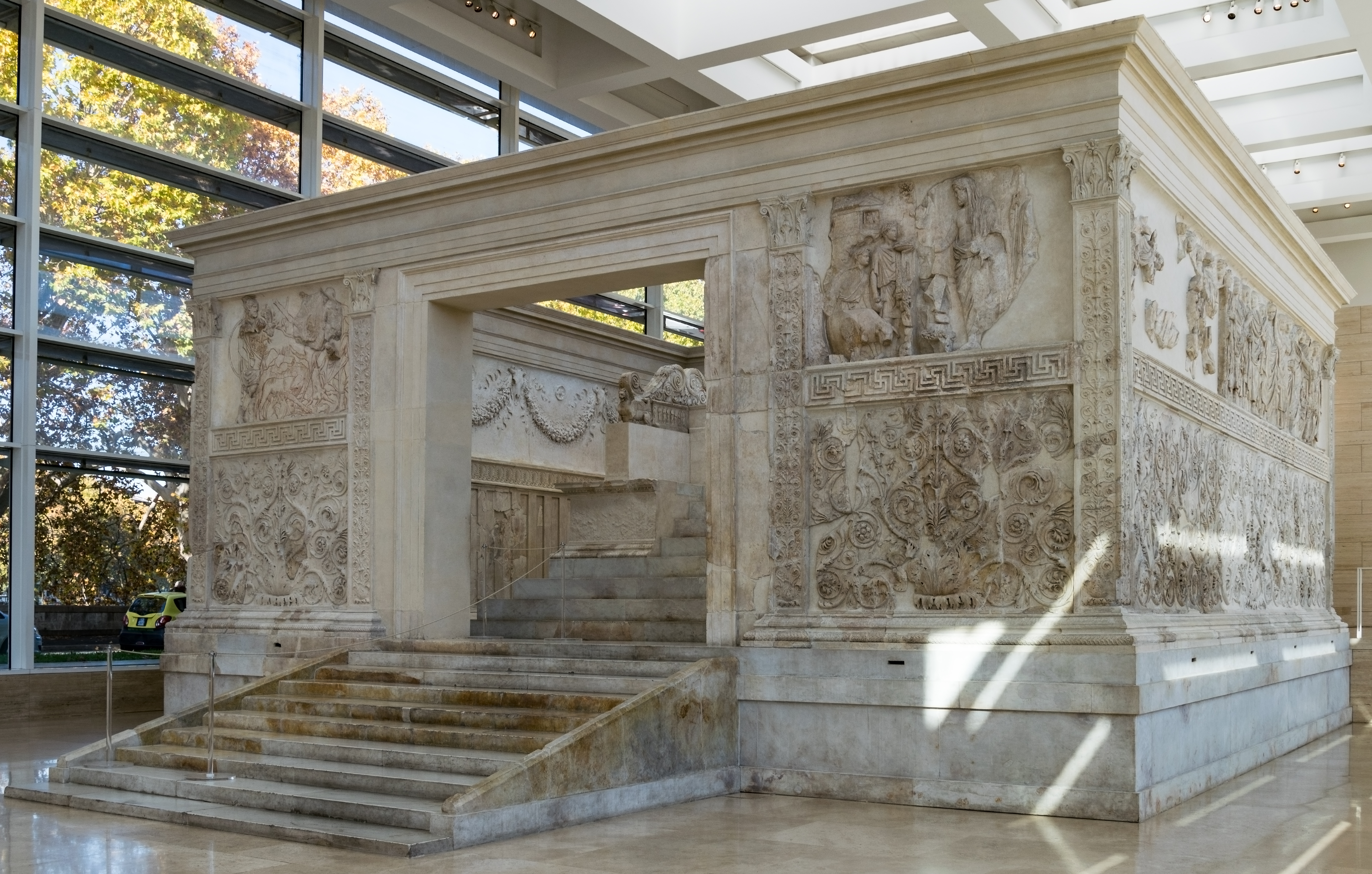
- The altar as reassembled, showing original western side
- Click on the map for a fullscreen view
- Coordinates: 41°54′23″N 12°28′32″E

The Ara Pacis Augustae (Latin, "Altar of Augustan Peace"; commonly shortened to Ara Pacis) is an altar in Rome dedicated to the Pax Romana. The monument was commissioned by the Roman Senate on July 4, 13 BC to honour the return of Augustus to Rome after three years in Hispania and Gaul and consecrated on January 30, 9 BC. Originally located on the northern outskirts of Rome, a Roman mile from the boundary of the pomerium on the west side of the Via Flaminia, the Ara Pacis stood in the northeastern corner of the Campus Martius, the former flood plain of the Tiber River and gradually became buried under 4 metres (13 ft) of silt deposits. It was reassembled in its current location, now the Museum of the Ara Pacis, in 1938, turned 90° counterclockwise from its original orientation so that the original western side now faces south.

== Significance ==
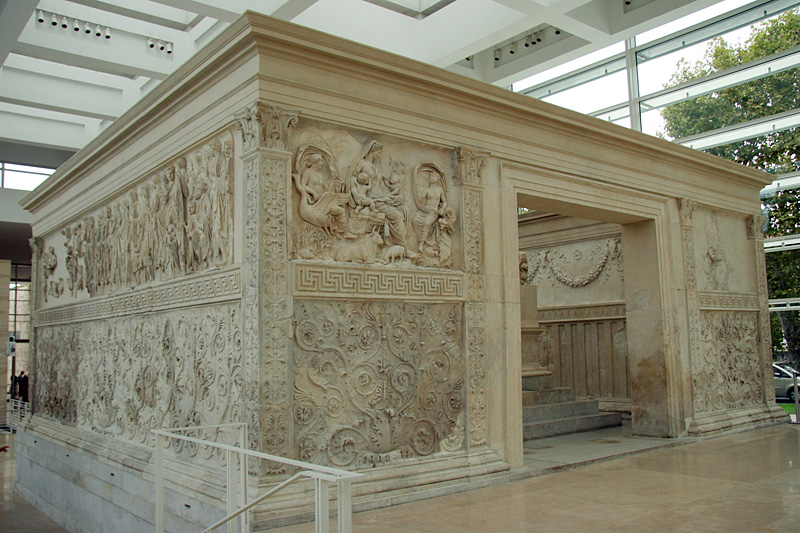
View of the opposite (eastern) side with Tellus Panel at the left and Roma Panel at the right

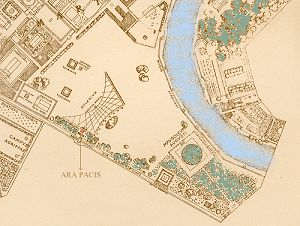
Map showing the original location of the Ara Pacis

The altar reflects the Augustan vision of Roman civil religion. The lower register of its frieze depicts agricultural imagery meant to evoke prosperity, abundance, and the renewed stability associated with the Pax Romana. As a whole, the monument functions both as a site of civic ritual and as a propaganda statement supporting Augustus's regime. The inclusion of the imperial household in the processional friezes further supports Augustus's efforts to legitimize dynastic succession and reconcile monarchical power with Roman cultural expectations.

== Structure ==
Plan of the Ara Pacis. North is at the left

The Ara Pacis Augustae, or Altar of Augustan Peace, consists of a central sacrificial altar enclosed by precinct walls made of Luna marble. The monument sits on a podium and is entered from the west, where a small staircase would have led visitors into the open-air ritual space. The design combines a traditional Roman altar layout with carved marble panels that reflect Augustan religious and political themes.

=== Altar ===
The central altar preserves fragments of scenes illustrating the lex arae, or the rules for sacrifices performed there. The surviving reliefs show attendants leading animals for sacrifice, carved in a style common in the late Republic as seen in works like the Altar of Domitius Ahenobarbus. These scenes focus on depicting the actual ritual rather than decorative detail, highlighting the altar’s practical role within Augustan religious ceremonies.

The interior walls of the precinct feature a frieze of bucrania (ox skulls) alternating with garlands of fruit and flowers. These motifs were commonly used in Roman sacred art and often referred to ceremonial offerings and ritual purity. The lower part of the wall is carved to imitate wooden planks, connecting the monument to earlier altars traditionally placed at the boundaries of Rome’s pomerium and reinforcing its link to Rome’s ancestral ritual practices.

=== Exterior wall decoration ===
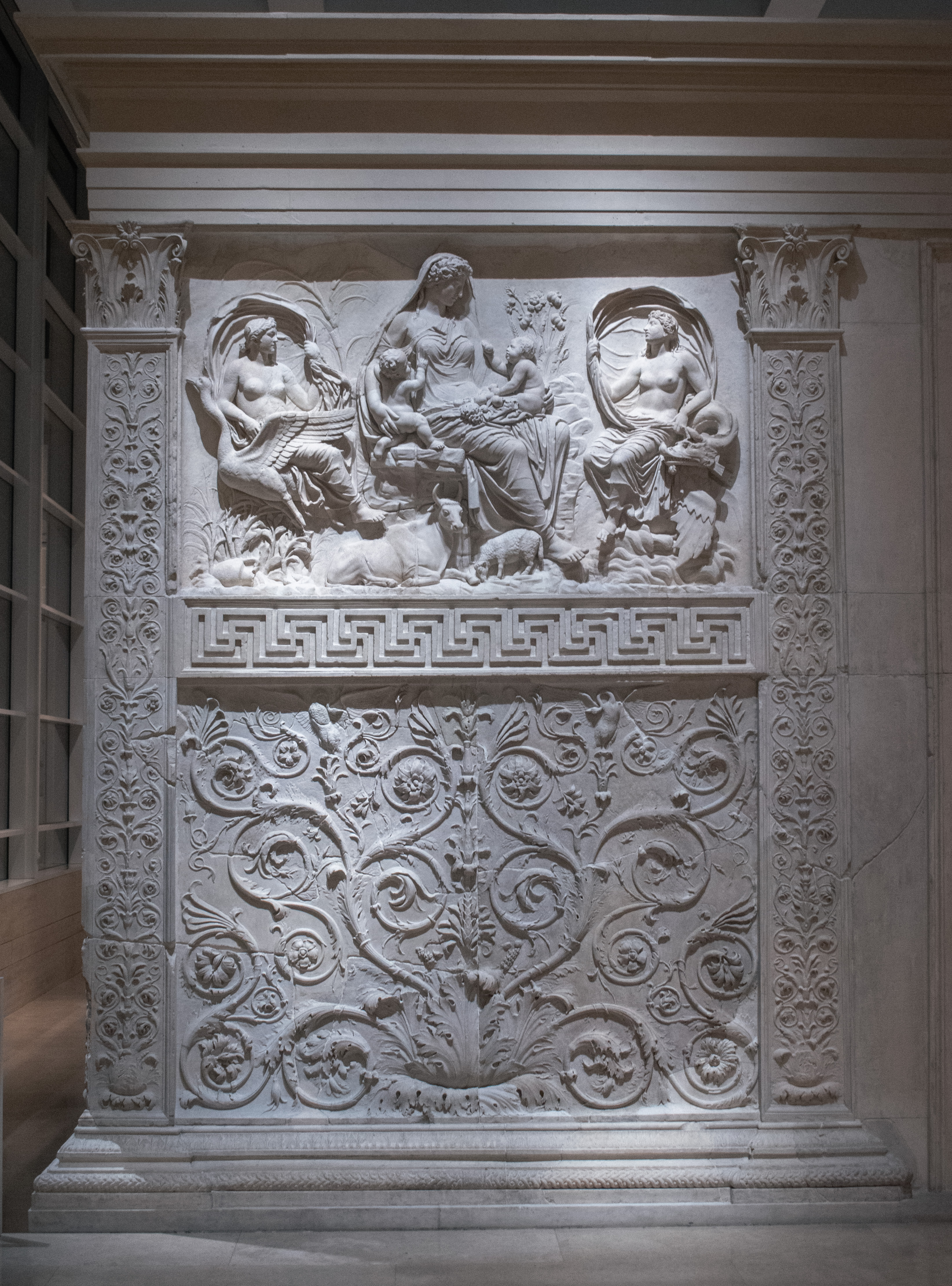
Ara Pacis: the so-called Tellus panel

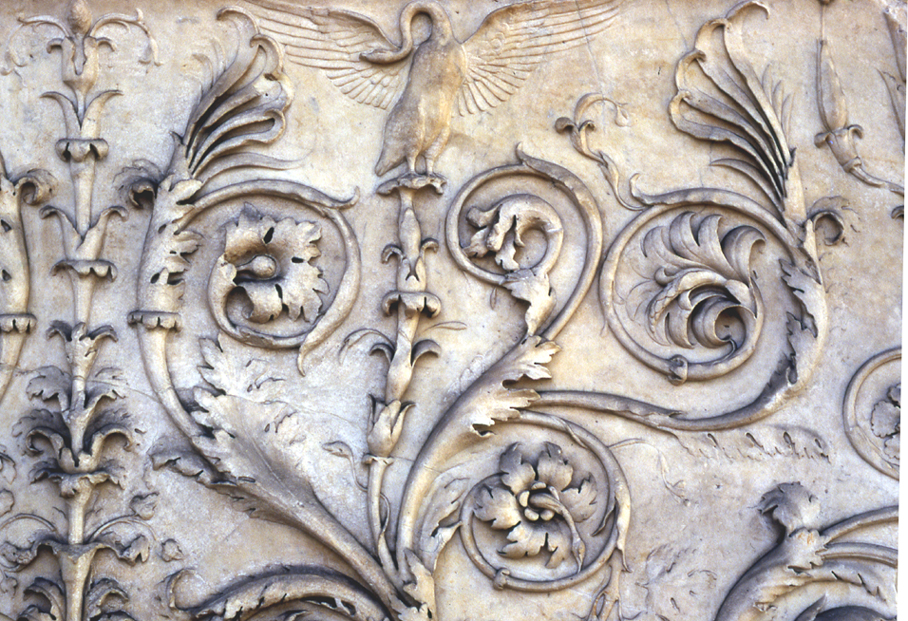
Sculpted detail of the Ara Pacis (Altar of Peace), 13–9 BC

The exterior decoration of the Ara Pacis Augustae is divided into two main zones: the lower register, which contains the vegetal frieze, and the upper register, which features the processional and mythological panels. Together, these elements communicate both the natural prosperity associated with the Pax Augusta and the human and divine figures who supported Augustus’s political authority. Early interpretations emphasized fertility and cosmic symbolism, while more recent scholarship has examined how these images relate to Augustan ritual practice and ideological messaging.

Lower register

The lower register shows a continuous frieze of acanthus scrolls filled with animals, small birds, insects, and mythological creatures. Scholars often interpret the twisting vines as symbols of growth, abundance, and the renewed prosperity associated with Augustus's rule. The careful and dense carvings create a decorative base for the more symbolic scenes above and it links the natural world to the altar's broader themes of peace and stability.

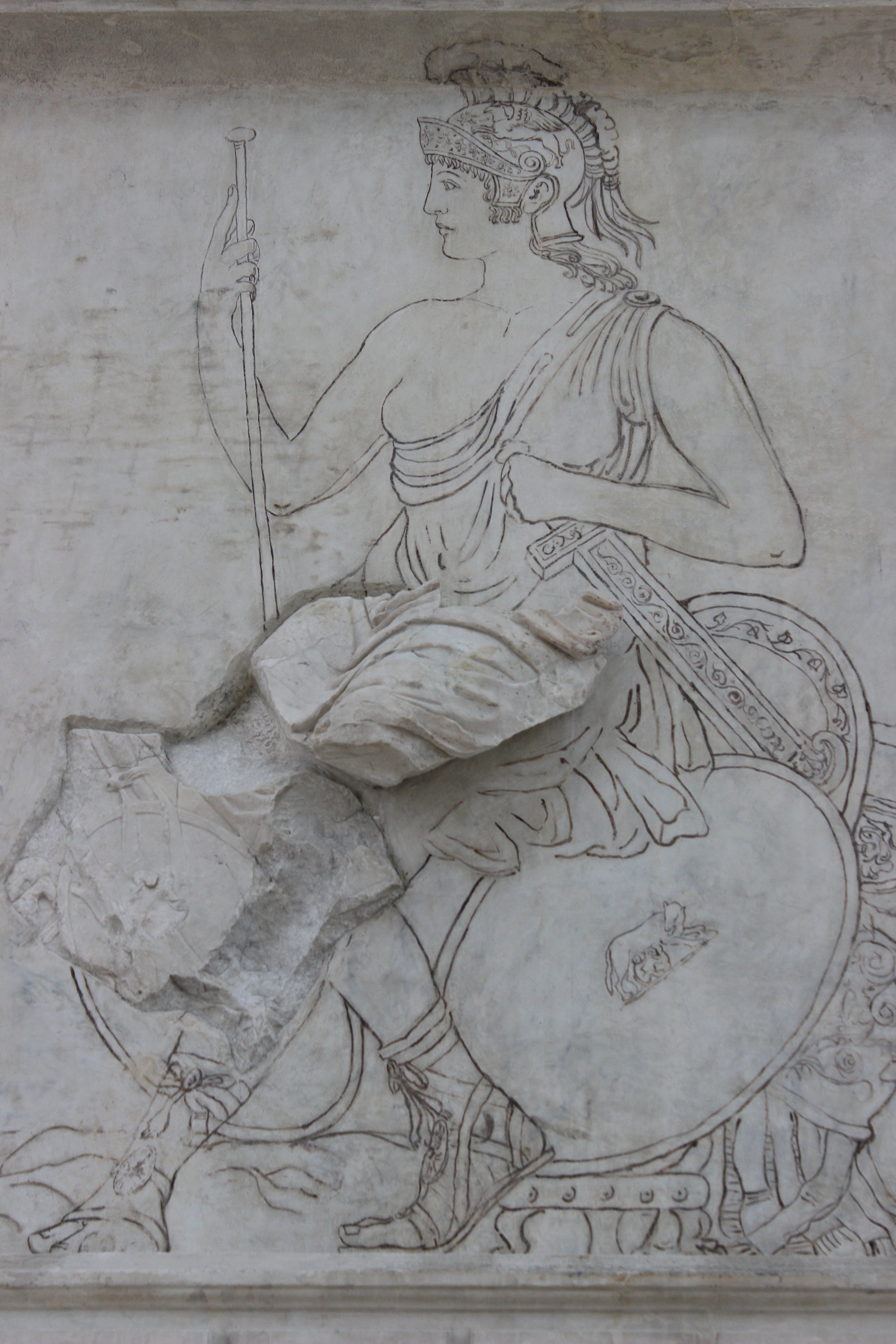
Roma, the personification of Rome

Upper register

Mythological panels: The upper register on the east and west sides contains four mythological scenes that relate to Rome’s origins, divine protection, and Augustan ideology. One well-preserved panel shows a seated female figure surrounded by children, vegetation, and personifications of breezes, plants, and animals. Scholars have proposed various identifications for her, such as Pax, Italia, Venus, or Tellus, reflecting ongoing debate about the altar's symbolic emphasis on fertility, abundance, and civic harmony.

Another panel portrays a bearded figure performing a sacrifice. This figure was traditionally identified as Aeneas, the Trojan ancestor of Rome’s founders, but modern scholars argue that he may instead represent Numa Pompilius, Rome’s second king, whose association with peace and religious rites aligns closely with the altar's themes.

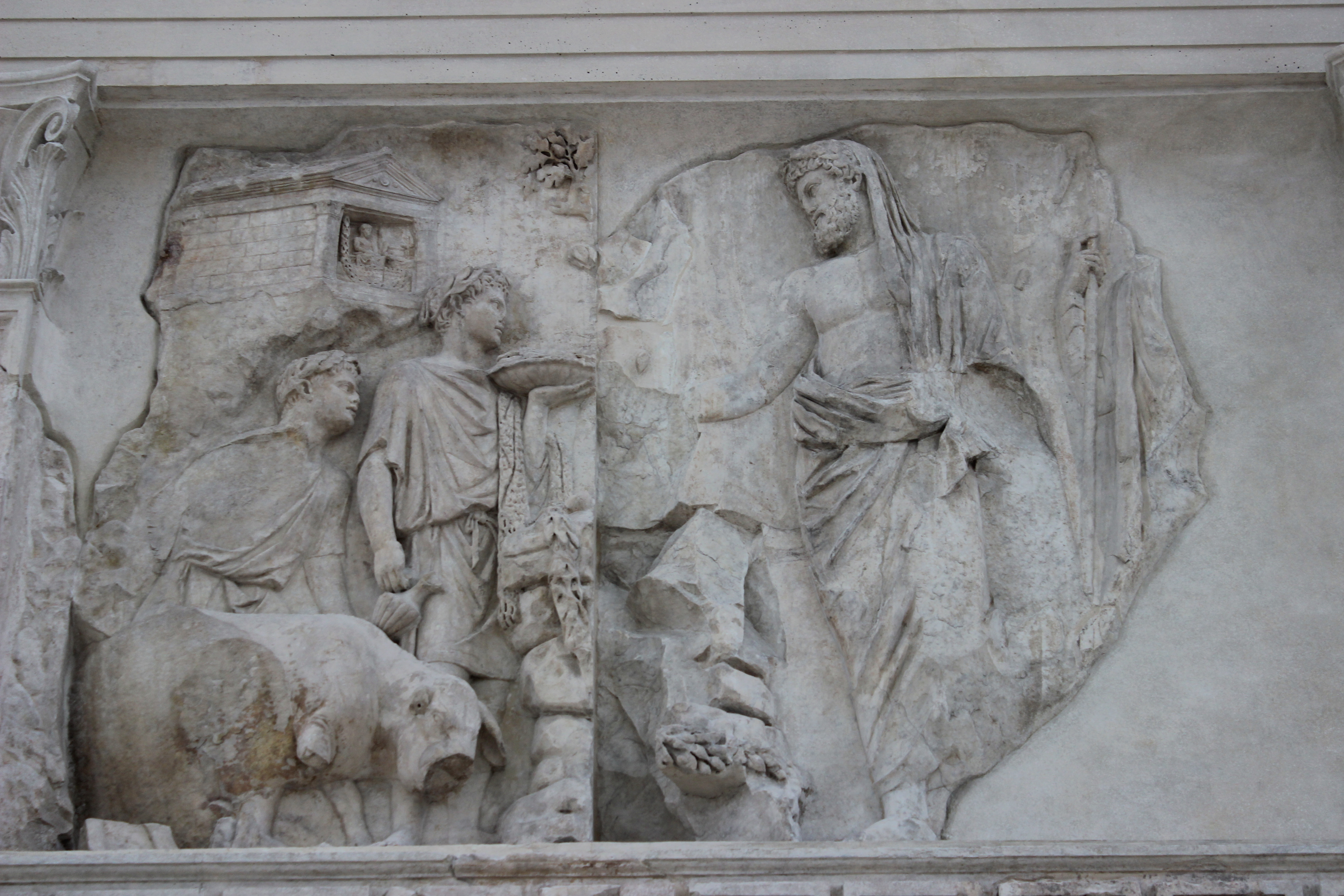
Relief showing a sacrifice performed by Aeneas or Numa Pompilius.

On the opposite side, a female figure commonly interpreted as Roma sits on a pile of captured weapons (war trophy), symbolizing victory and the peace that made the Pax Augusta possible. A fourth, now-fragmentary panel also depicts a female figure linked with themes of foundation and peace, although its poor preservation makes the original composition uncertain. The general compositions of these panels have been reconstructed through comparisons with coins, literary descriptions, and related Augustan artwork.

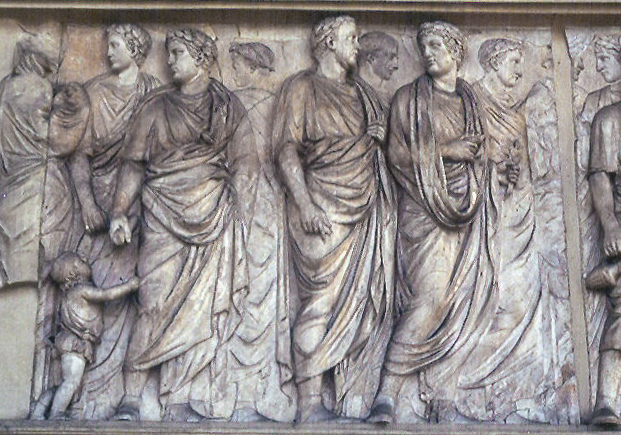
Ara Pacis: detail of the processional frieze showing priests at right and the Germanic hostage/guest (north face).

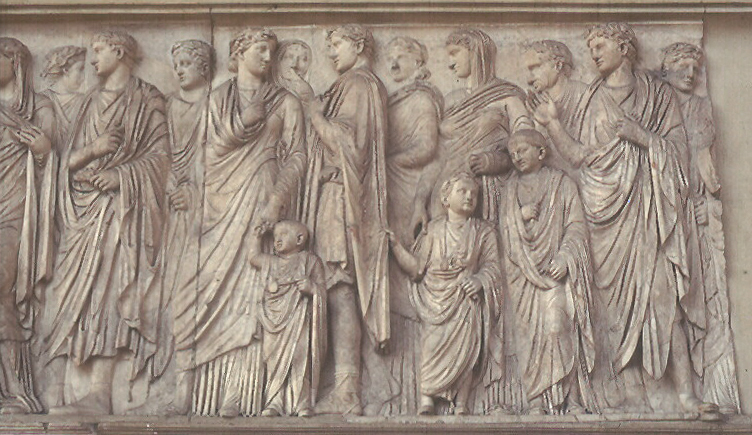
Ara Pacis: processional frieze showing members of the Imperial household (south face)

Processional friezes: The long processional friezes on the north and south walls depict a state ceremony held for the dedication of the altar. The figures are advancing toward the west side, where the sacrificial ritual would have taken place. The procession includes members from major priestly colleges (the Pontifices, Septemviri, and Quindecimviri), Roman magistrates carrying fasces. to show authority, attendants, and identifiable members of the imperial household (Augustus, Agrippa, Livia, Tiberius, and Julia). The participants of the procession represent the religious and political power structure that supported Augustus and legitimized his rule. Women and children appear prominently in these scenes, a notable change from earlier Roman public monuments. Scholars often interpret their presence as reinforcing Augustus's social and moral reforms, particularly his emphasis on family life and generational continuity. The inclusion of several foreign children has been interpreted as a representation of Rome's expanding empire and integration of diversity under the Roman rule. The figures are carved in a naturalistic manner, with overlapping poses, and the artists use differences in clothing, hairstyles, and gestures to distinguish individuals and groups without relying on inscriptions.

== Excavation and conservation ==
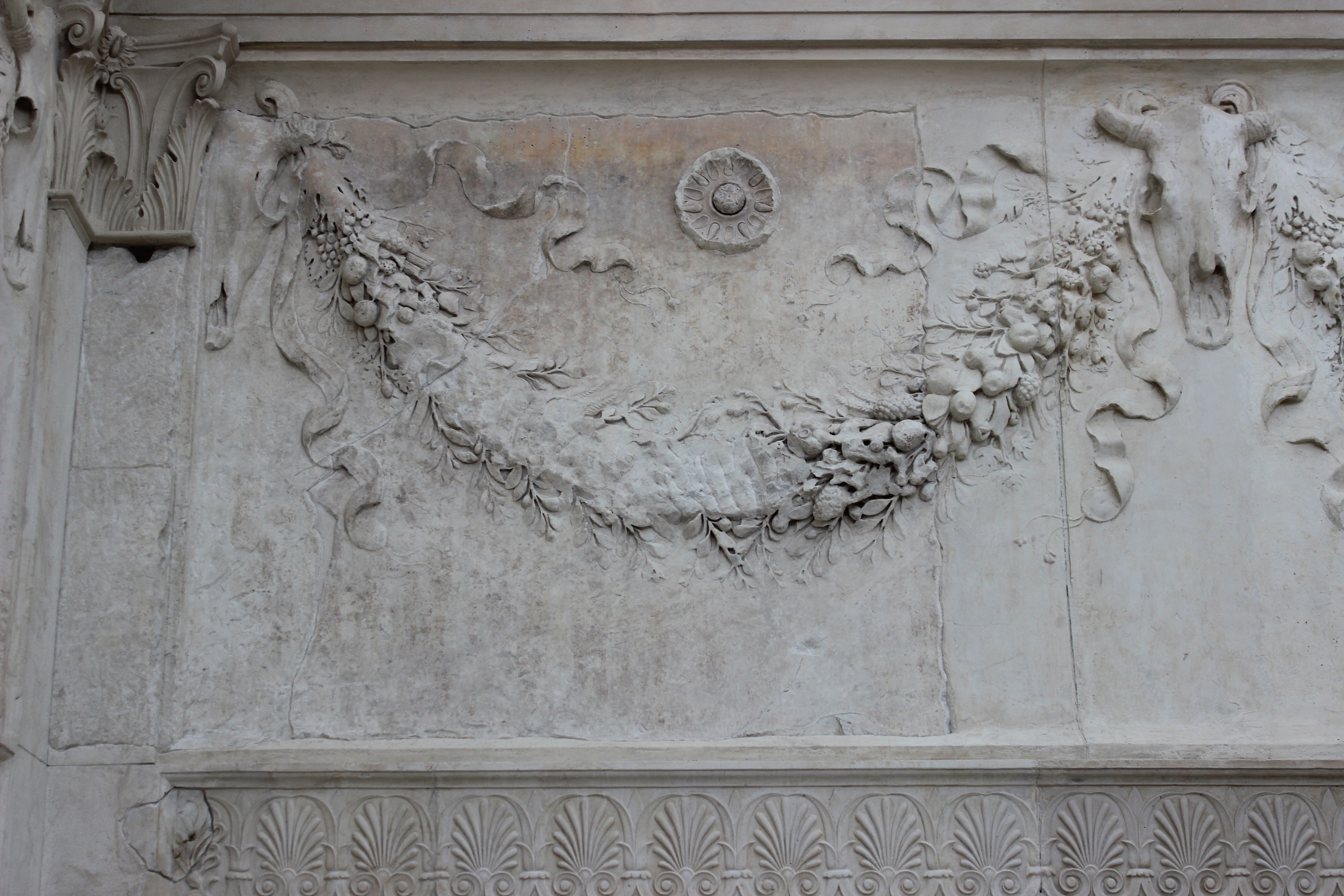
Section of the interior frieze, showing a damaged original section amid the modern reconstruction.

External videos
- Ara Pacis, Smarthistory

Fragmentary sculptures from the Ara Pacis were first rediscovered in 1568, when portions of the frieze were uncovered beneath the Palazzo Peretti in Lucina (also known as Palazzo Fano-Almagià), near the basilica San Lorenzo in Lucina and the modern Via del Corso. Many of these early finds were eventually moved to collections such as the Villa Medici, the Vatican, the Uffizi and the Louvre.

Further fragments were found in 1859 during excavations beneath the Teatro Olimpia, another property belonging to the Peretti family. Scholars recognized that these newly uncovered pieces belonged to the same monument as the earlier finds.

A major turning point happened in 1903, when, after Friedrich von Duhn's identification of the reliefs as belonging to the Ara Pacis (1879–81), the Ministry of Public Education received a formal request to continue the excavations. Progress was made possible by the generosity of Edoardo Almagià, who gave permission for the exploration and funded the work. However, the excavations soon encountered structural risks to the Teatro Olimpia. After recovering 53 fragments, approximately half of the surviving material, the excavation was called to a halt for safety reasons.

Urban redevelopment plans also influenced the site's history. In 1909, the Italian government approved the demolition of several buildings surrounding the Mausoleum of Augustus to bring the mausoleum back to view. After the First World War, in 1918, Oreste Mattirolo, the President of the Piedmontese Society of Archaeology and Fine Arts, proposed assembling all known fragments to reconstruct the altar.

Demolition of buildings around the mausoleum officially began in 1932, part of broader transformations occurring throughout Rome at the time. In February 1937, the Italian Cabinet ordered the excavation and reconstruction of the Ara Pacis for the 2000th anniversary of the birth of Augustus. Engineers employed innovative techniques, including freezing approximately seventy cubic meters of soil under what was by then the Cinema Nuovo Olimpia, to safely extract the remaining fragments.

Since the reconstruction had to be completed by 23 September 1938, and because only limited ancient material and documentation survived (primarily a few Roman coins), the project required significant artist intervention. The Italian artist Odoardo Ferretti assisted in designing the missing portions, allowing the fragments to be assembled into the monument's modern form.

=== Protective pavilion ===
In 1938 the finally reconstructed Ara was placed near the Mausoleum of Augustus, and a big pavilion was built around it by architect Vittorio Ballio Morpurgo as part of Benito Mussolini's attempt to create an ancient Roman "theme park" to glorify Fascist Italy. Several dozen buildings surrounding the Mausoleum were levelled to free up space around the monument. This led to a great number of complaints from locals, starting a long series of arguments and criticisms of the Ara Pacis project. These arguments are ongoing despite the original pavilion being replaced by a new one in 2006, known as the "Ara Pacis museum".

=== Museum of the Ara Pacis ===
The historic Fascist style building around the Altar, locally known as "teca del Morpurgo", was pulled down in 2006, and replaced by a glass and steel structure in modern style, designed by architect Richard Meier. The new cover building, which has been named "Ara Pacis museum", now stands on the same site as Mussolini's structure. This new structure is much bigger than the previous one and it is divided into multiple rooms and sections besides the main one containing the altar.

Meier's building construction caused new arguments and criticism, after the ones which accompanied the first building construction, both from Roman inhabitants and foreign observers, probably due both to political memory tied to the pre-existing pavilion and to the visual impact of the new pavilion, which in the opinion of many is in stark contrast with surrounding historical buildings.

Nicolai Ouroussoff, of The New York Times called the building "a contemporary expression of what can happen when an architect fetishizes his own style out of a sense of self-aggrandizement. Absurdly over-scale, it seems indifferent to the naked beauty of the dense and richly textured city around it." Former mayor Gianni Alemanno, backed in July 2008 by culture undersecretary Francesco Maria Giro, pledged to tear down the new structure. He later changed his stance on the building and has agreed with Mr. Meier to modifications including drastically reducing the height of the wall between an open-air space outside the museum and a busy road along the Tiber river. The city plans to build a wide pedestrian area along the river and run the road underneath it. "It's an improvement," says Meier, adding that "the reason that wall was there has to do with traffic and noise. Once that is eliminated, the idea of opening the piazza to the river is a good one." While the mayor's office said Alemanno hoped to complete the project before the end of his term in 2013, it was suspended due to a spending review and the €1.8 million were redirected to three schools instead. The three schools were the Sagittario Nursery School, the Verdi Elementary School and the Salvo D'Acquisto School on Via Selinunte.

== Gallery of reliefs ==
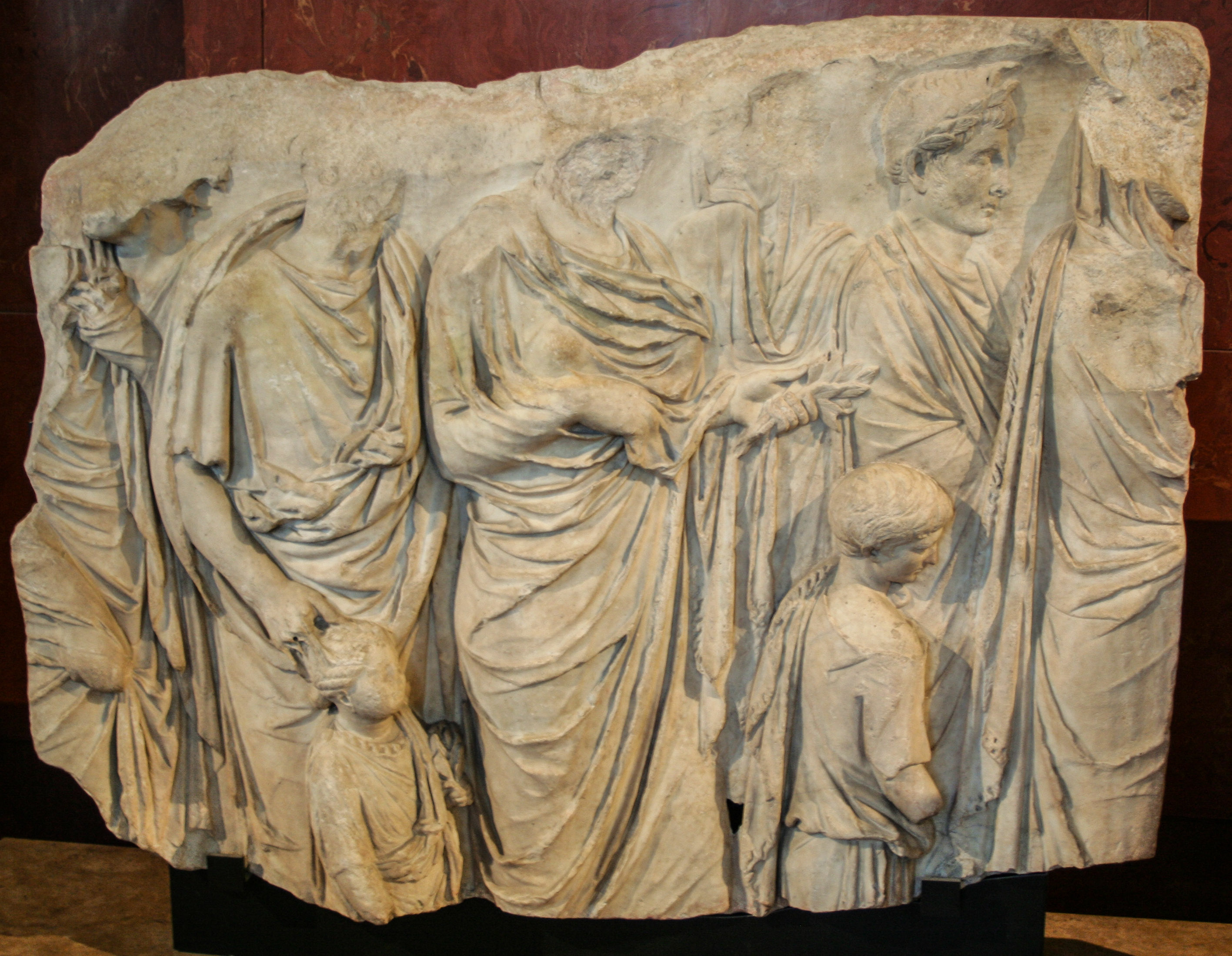
Ara Pacis relief in the Louvre Museum, Paris.

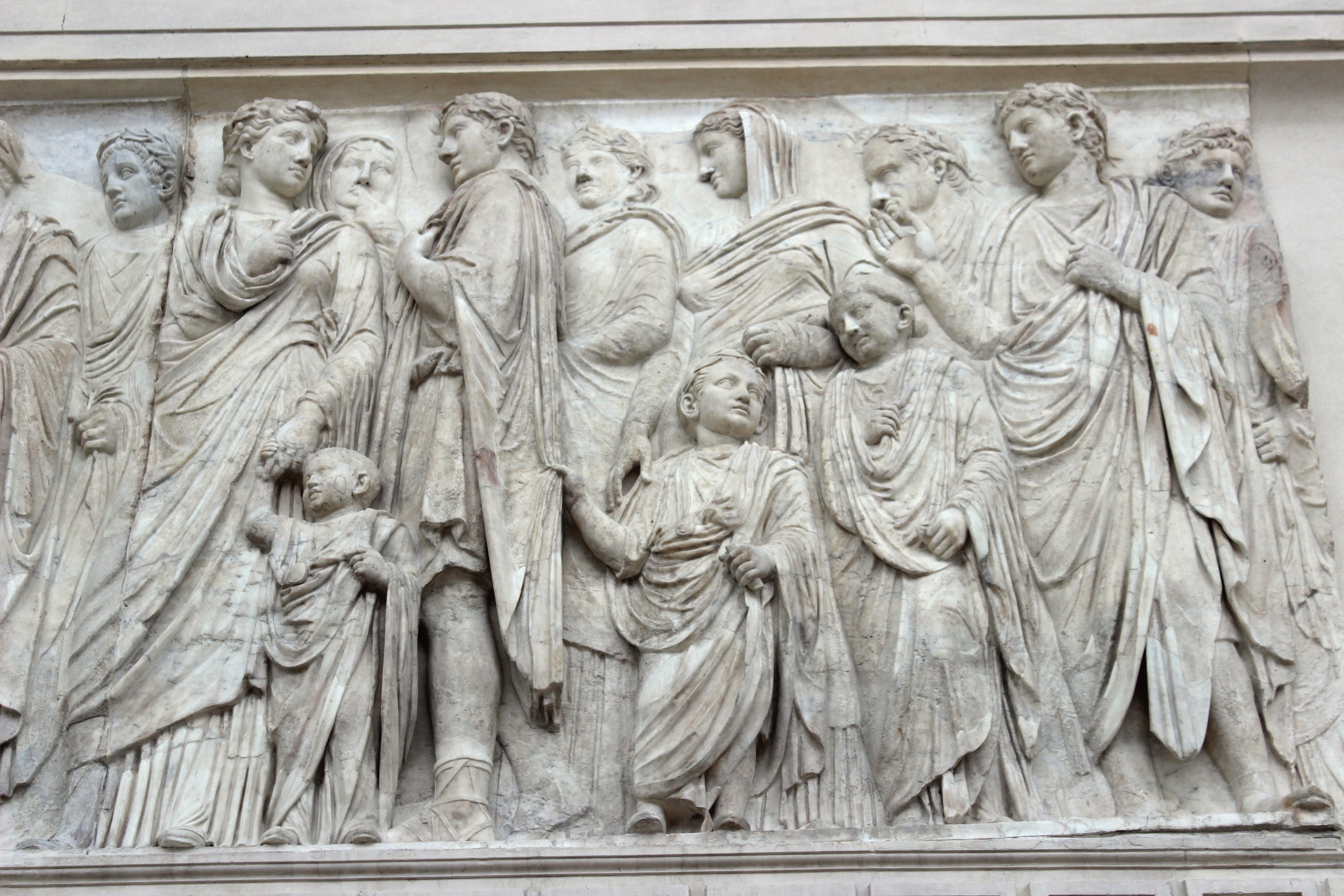
Ara Pacis relief

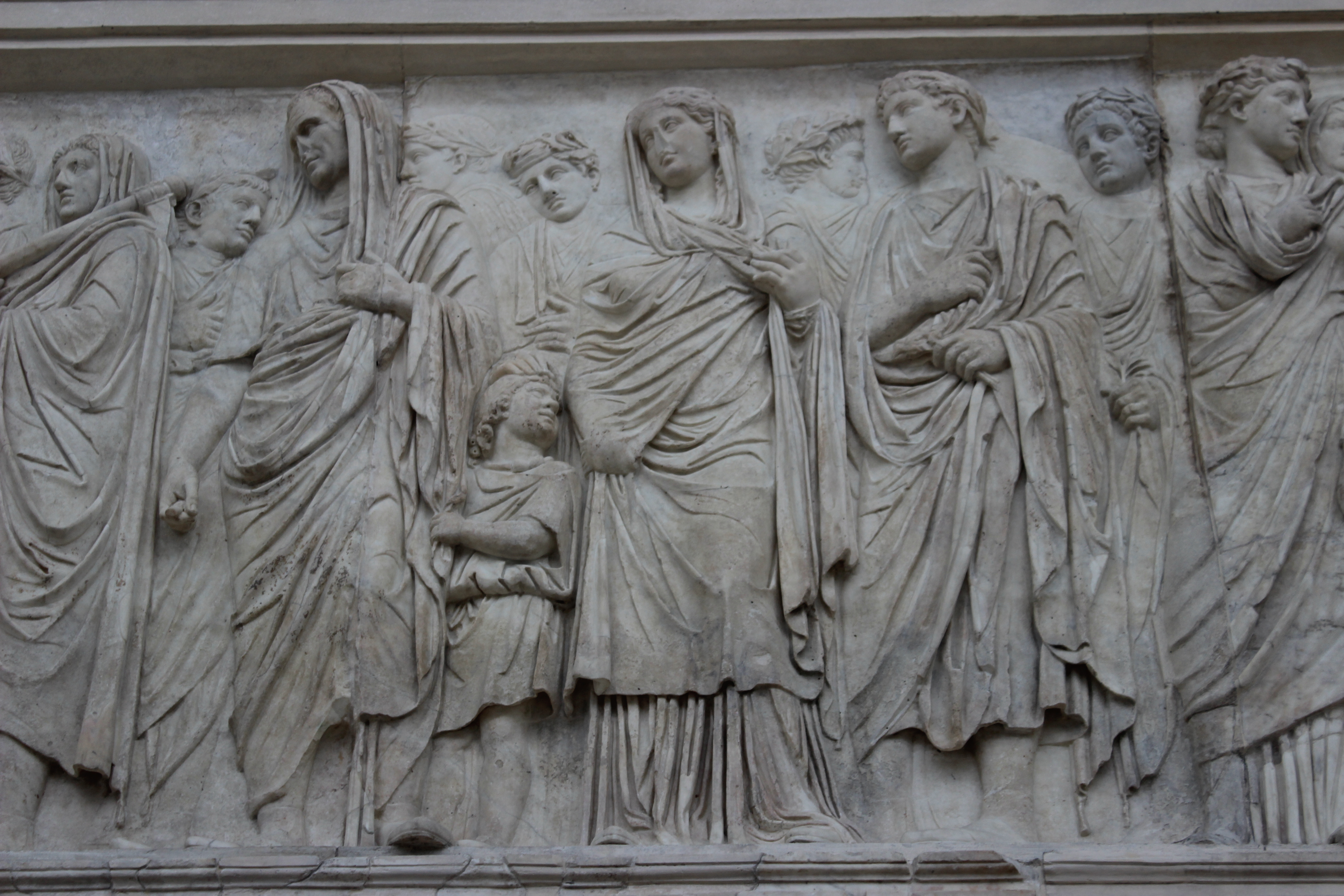
Ara Pacis relief

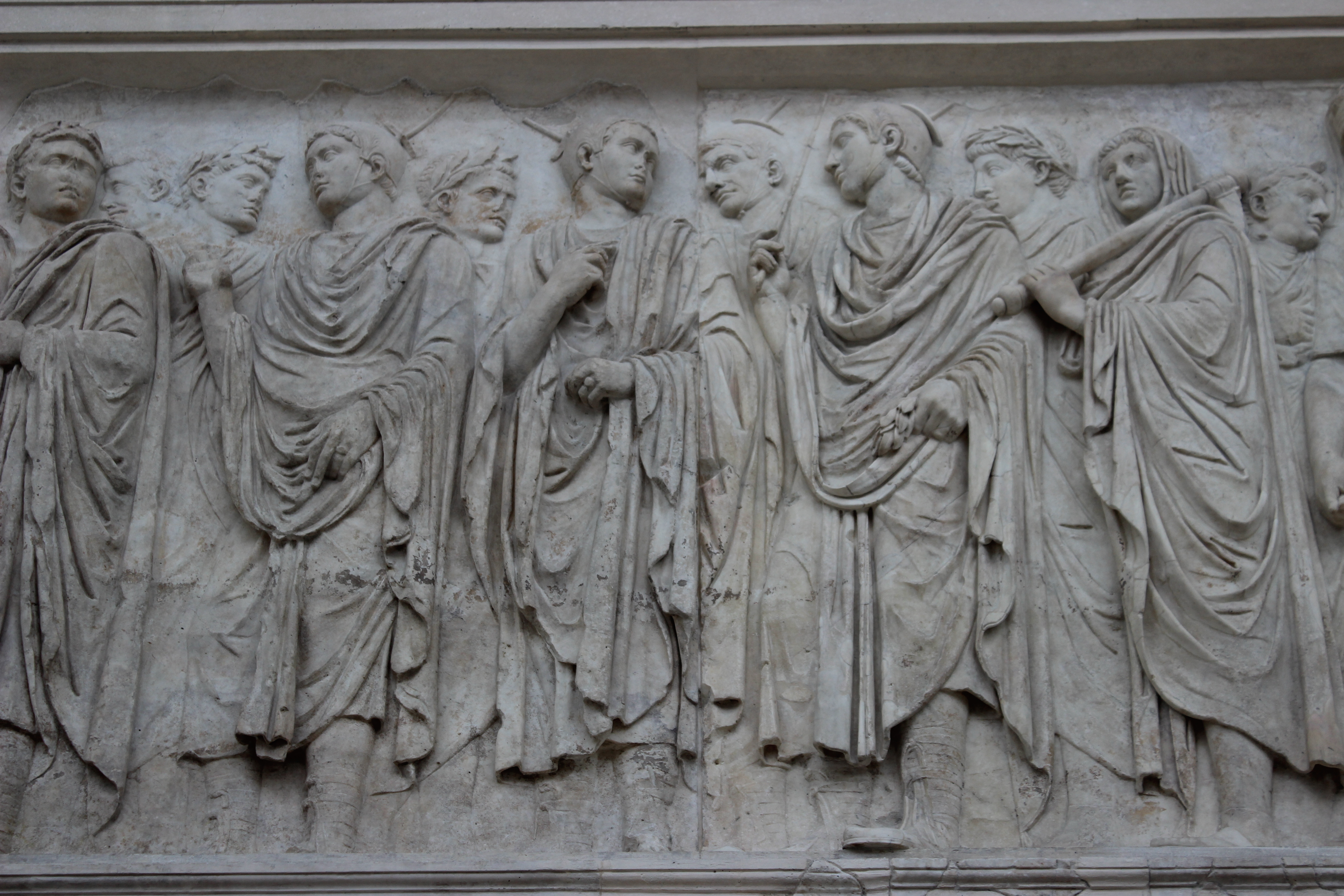
Ara Pacis relief

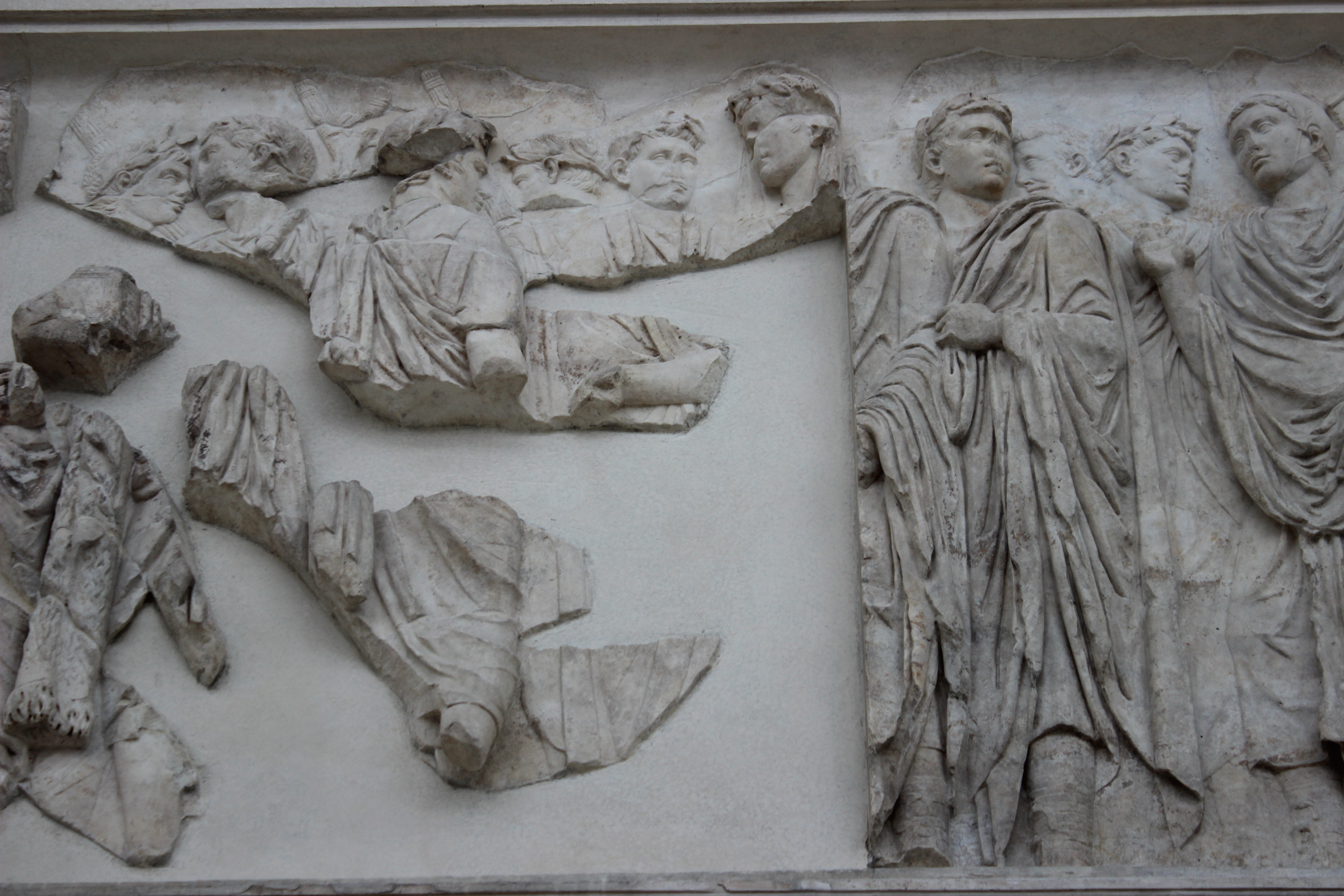
Ara Pacis relief

== See also ==
- Temple of Hadrian – Ancient religious monument in Rome, Italy
- Roman Forum – Ancient Roman centre of Rome, Italy
- Naming of asteroid 100731 Ara Pacis
- Imperial cult
- List of Ancient Roman temples

== Bibliography ==
- Crow, Charlotte (June 2006). "The Ara Pacis". History Today. 56 (6).
- Augustus. Res Gestae Divi Augusti [The Achievements of the Deified Augustus]. c. 14 AD.
- Galinsky (1966). "Venus in a relief of the Ara Pacis Augustae". American Journal of Archaeology. 70 (3): 223–243. doi:10.2307/501892. JSTOR 501892. S2CID 191379048.
- Holliday (December 1990). "Time, History, and Ritual on the Ara Pacis Augustae". The Art Bulletin. 72 (4): 542–557. doi:10.2307/3045761. JSTOR 3045761.
- Sieveking (1907). "Zur Ara Pacis". Jahresheft des Österreichischen Archeologischen Institut (in German). 10.
- Rehak (2001). "Rethinking the Meaning of the Ara Pacis Augustae". The Art Bulletin. 83. doi:10.2307/3177206. hdl:1808/7063. JSTOR 3177206.
- Stern, Gaius (2006). Women, Children, and Senators on the Ara Pacis Augustae. Berkeley, CA.
- Zanker, Paul (1990). The power of images in the Age of Augustus. Translated by Alan Shapiro. Ann Arbor, Mich.: University of Michigan Press. ISBN 9780472081240.
- Roberts, John, ed. (2007). "Āra Pācis". Oxford Dictionary of the Classical World. Oxford University Press. ISBN 9780191727061. Archived from the original on 4 May 2015. Subscription required.
- Torelli, Mario (1982). Typology and Structure of Roman Historical Reliefs. Ann Arbor: University of Michigan Press. ISBN 0472081713.
- Dumézil, Georges (1958). L'Idéologie tripartie des Indo-Européens: réponse à MM. Walter Pötscher et Martin van den Bruwaene. Brussels: Latomus.
- Dumézil, Georges (1941). Jupiter Mars Quirinus. Gallimard. ISBN 2070220680.
- Freibergs, G. (June 1986). "Indo-European Tripartition and the Ara Pacis Augustae: An Excursus in Ideological Archeology". Numen. 33 (1): 3–32. doi:10.1163/156852786x00075.
- de Grummond, Nancy (1990). "Pax Augusta and the Horae on the Ara Pacis Augustae". American Journal of Archaeology. 94 (4): 663–677. doi:10.2307/505125. JSTOR 505125.
- Weinstock, Stefan (1960). "Pax and the 'Ara Pacis'". The Journal of Roman Studies. 50 (1–2): 44–58. doi:10.2307/298286. JSTOR 298286. S2CID 161690264.

Preceded by Baths of Trajan	Landmarks of Rome; Ara Pacis	Succeeded by Temple of Antoninus and Faustina
