= Piazza della Libertà, Rome =

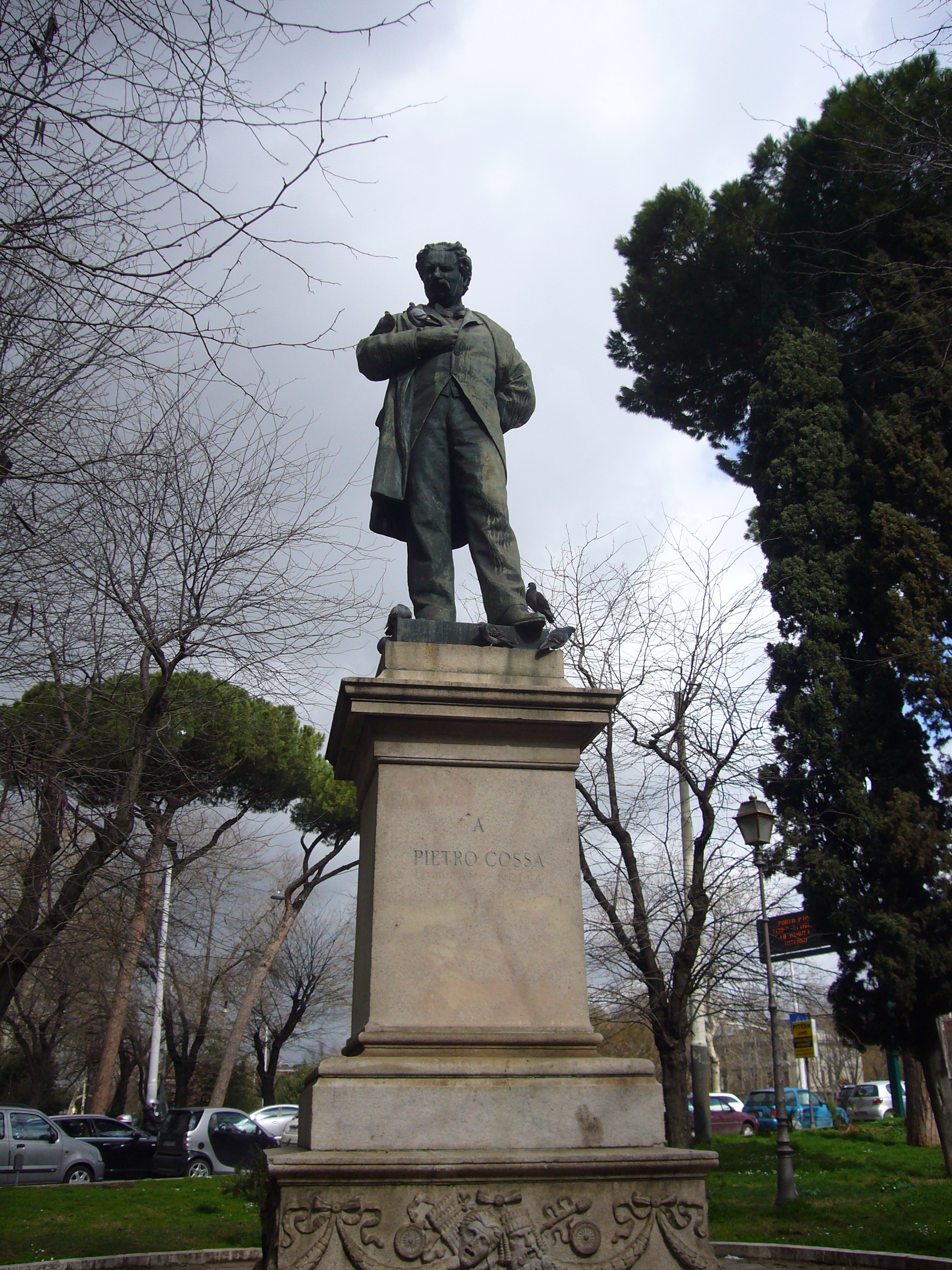
The monument to Pietro Cossa in Piazza della Libertà

Piazza della Libertà (Italian for 'Freedom Square'; pronounced [ˈpjattsa della liberˈta]) is a square in the rione Prati in Rome (Italy).

== Description ==
The square lies at the end of Ponte Regina Margherita (formerly the last bridge upstream in the town before Ponte Milvio) on the right bank of the Tiber; from it starts Via Cola di Rienzo, that crosses the rione Prati ending in Piazza Risorgimento.

The square has a rectangular shape and consists of two green areas with flowerbeds; it shows some centuries-old trees and is surrounded by eclectic-style buildings. It dates back to the urbanization of the quarter, started in 1873 according to the so-called "Viviani Town-Plan".

The monuments of the square include a 20th-century sacred aedicula portraying the Virgin with the Child, a 19th-century monument to the dramatist Pietro Cossa and Casa De' Salvi, an apartment house built in 1930 by architect Pietro Aschieri.

The square hosts the seats of the Fondazione Internazionale Irina Alberti and the Fondazione Gabriele Sandri.

== Establishment of the Società Podistica Lazio ==
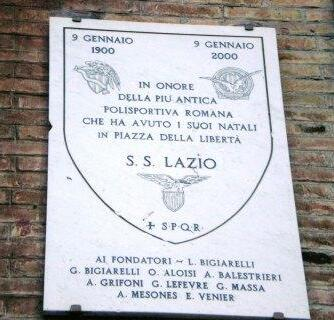
The plaque affixed in Piazza della Libertà with the names of the founders of the Società Podistica Lazio

In this square, on January 9, 1900, a group of nine Roman boys - led by the young Bersaglieri petty officer and road runner Luigi Bigiarelli - made official the Società Podistica Lazio (with its former name Società Podistica Lazio).

The founders, seated on a bench of the square, decided to found the Società Podistica Lazio and chose its name and colors.

The square was the meeting point of the boys, which, after swimming, came up from Tiber through a little staircase.

The nine founders were Luigi Bigiarelli, his brother Giacomo, Alberto Mesones, Alceste Grifoni, Odoacre Aloisi, Galileo Massa, Arturo Balestrieri, Enrico Venier and Giulio Lefevre; Rinaldo Fortini, Olindo Bitetti, Tito Masini and others joined the group immediately after.

On January 9, 2000, centenary of the establishment, a plaque has been uncovered in the square.

== Bibliography ==
- Pennacchia, Mario (January 3, 2000). La Gazzetta dello Sport (ed.). "All'inizio era una società di podisti". p. 5.
- info.roma.it. "Piazza della Libertà, Roma".
- "Fondazione Internazionale Irina Alberti". Archived from the original on September 22, 2013.
