= Vittorio Ballio Morpurgo =

Italian architect (1890–1966)

- Born: 31 May 1890; Rome, Kingdom of Italy
- Died: 27 December 1966 (aged 76); Rome, Italy
- Education: Sapienza University of Rome
- Occupations: Architect, academic

Palazzo della Farnesina, Rome, designed by Morpurgo, Enrico Del Debbio and Arnaldo Foschini.

Vittorio Ballio Morpurgo (31 May 1890 – 27 December 1966) was an Italian architect. He was a prominent representative of Italian Rationalist architecture of the 1930s.
