= Sallustiano obelisk =

Landmark in Rome, Italy

Sallustian Obelisk
- L'obelisco Sallustiano
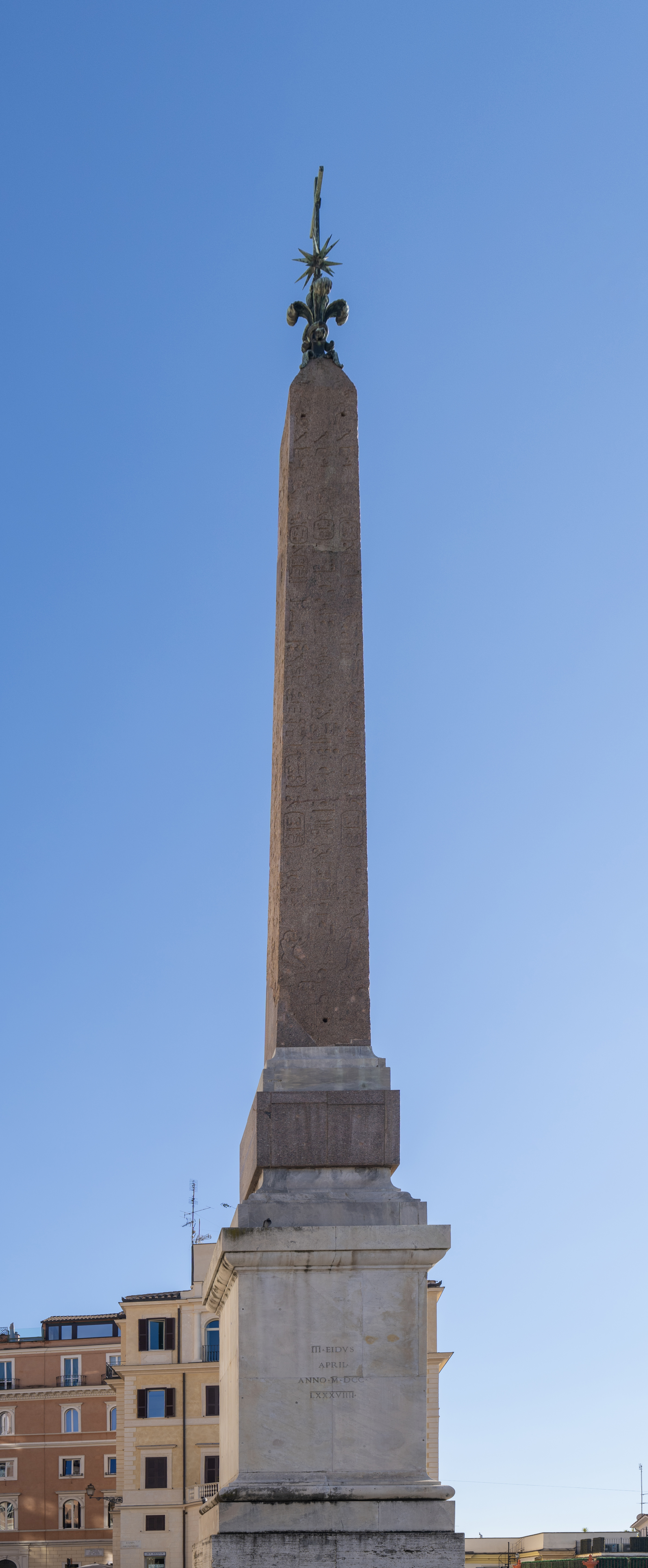
- The obelisk in 2005
- Interactive map of Sallustian Obelisk
- Location: Trinità dei Monti, Rome, Italy
- Coordinates: 41°54′22″N 12°29′00″E
- Type: Egyptian Granite Monolithic Obelisk carved in Rome
- Material: 13.91 metres (45.6 ft) Red Granite from Aswan
- Height: 15.21 metres (49.9 ft) (with pedestal)
- Weight: c.40 long tons (41 t)
- Beginning date: Initial quarrying unknown. Carved c.270CE Aurelian Rome;
- Dedicated date: Initial dedication unknown. Rededicated 11 April 1789 by Pius VI.
- Restored date: 1734 by Clement XII
- Dedicated to: The Holy Trinity
- Dismantled date: felled c.410CE during the Sack of Rome

The Sallustiano obelisk (Italian: Obelisco Sallustiano) is an obelisk installed at the top of the Spanish Steps, outside the Trinità dei Monti, in Rome, Italy, in the District of the Campus of Mars. Historically, it was believed to be related to the Moon and its worship, giving it an alternative name, the Lunar Obelisk. It was erected in its present location in the 1780s by Pope Pius VI. It is one of the 18 (previously 19) obelisks, 12 of which date to antiquity, which presently stand in the City of Rome.

== History ==
The Obelisk itself is a (now broken and reconstructed) monolith of Red Aswan Granite. It was intended to appear that this obelisk was dedicated to the 19th Dynasty Pharaohs Seti I and Rameses II who lived in the late 1200s-early 1300s BCE. It bears their Cartouches. Ammianus Marcellinus believed that the obelisk was imported to Rome after the reign of Augustus, though he does not specify the exact period. Others, however, suspect that Aurelian may have commissioned its carving in Aswan during the 3rd century and had it transported to Rome before the inscriptions were added. However, examination of the hieroglyphic writings on the faces of the obelisk indicate that it is an inaccurate Roman copy, although smaller, of the Flaminio Obelisk constructed for Rameses II now standing in the Piazza del Popolo. This is because the hieroglyphs were copied from the Flaminio Obelisk, but the glyphs are sometimes backward, upside-down or incorrectly copied in some other manner, suggesting it was Italian Craftsmen in Rome, who could not read hieroglyphs, who performed the copy.

The obelisk enters recorded history when it was erected in the Gardens of Sallust on the Pincian Hill, where it likely adorned the spina (central barrier) of the Circus Sallustianus, a private circus within the imperial gardens there. This is where it stood until the Sack of Rome in 410CE during the fall of the Western Roman Empire. It was toppled at some point and broken into three pieces (including its base) and remained discarded in the ruins of the house of Sallust, later a cane field, for several hundred years. It came into the possession of the Ludovisi family, in 1621, when the area where the Gardens of Sallust had stood were purchased by Ludovico Ludovisi. It was during this period that Athanasius Kircher noted the similarity between it and the Flaminian Obelisk, and suggested to Pope Alexander VII that it be re-erected.

In 1722, the family donated the broken monument to Clement XII, who restored and reunited the two pieces of the Obelisk's shaft, and ordered it moved to the Scala Sancta in the Piazza di San Giovanni in Laterano in 1734. It was kept horizontal, until it was re-erected in 1789 by Pope Pius VI by the architect Giovanni Antinori in its present location, and dedicated to the Holy Trinity.

The Monument was capped with a top-element in bronze, featuring a Latin cross, a star-burst, and a small pine cone. The Cross is reported to contain a fragment of the True Cross, and relics of Saint Joseph, Saint Francis of Paola, Saint Pius V, and the apostles Peter and Paul. These three elements are in turn mounted upon a Fleur-de-Lys, the heraldic symbol of the French King, as the monument and the church before which it now stands were funded by the Kingdom of France.

=== The Pedestal ===
The Obelisk's original, monolithic, pedestal was rediscovered in 1843. It was in the Gardens of Sallust, where it had been buried, and was uncovered while removing a tree-stump. It was moved to the Villa Ludovisi and put away. Mussolini decided to make use of it in 1926 in order to construct a monument, an Altar, to those who had died during the 1922 March on Rome. It was named the Ara dei Caduti Fascisti and stood on the Capitoline Hill, between the Pallazzo Senatorio (Rome's City Hall) and the Church of Santa Maria in Ara Coeli. It was topped with a marble installation an engraved with a dedication. After the fall of the Fascist regime in Italy it was stripped of its marble decorations, inverted, and moved into a corner of the Campidoglio with its inscription facing against a Roman wall, in order to obscure the memory of its use as a Fascist memorial.

== Texts ==
The Text and Translation of the Inscriptions on the Pedestal
Latin Text	Translation	Image
PIVS·VI·PONT·MAX· OBELISCVM·SALLVSTIANVM; QVEM·PROLAPSIONE·DIFFRACTVM; SVPERIOR·AETAS; IACENTEM·RELIQVERAT; COLLI·HORTVLORVM; IN·SVBSIDENTIVM·VIARVM; PROSPECTV·IMPOSITVM; TROPAEO; CRVCIS·PRAEFIXO; TRINITATI·AVGVSTAE; DEDICAVIT	Pius VI, Supreme Pontiff, dedicates to the August Trinity, with the trophy of the Cross fixed on its summit, this Sallustian obelisk – which in a former age, after it had been shattered by a collapse, had been left lying neglected – and having placed it on the Pincian Hill (the Hill of Gardens) so as to be seen above the roads that descend below.	
III·EIDVS; APRIL; ANNO·M·DCC; LXXXVIIII	On the 3rd day before the Ides of April, in the year 1789 (11 April 1789).	
SACRI; PRINCIPATVS; EIVS; ANNO·XV	In the 15th year of his sacred reign.	

The Text inscribed by Mussolini on the original pedestal
Italian	Translation	Sources
QVESTA PIETRA; SV COLLE IMPERIALE D'ROMA; RICORDERA; NEI SECOLI; IL SACRIFICIO EROICO; DEI CADVTI; PER LA RIVOLVZIONE; DELLE CAMICIE NERE XXVIII OTTOBRE ANNO V	This stone on the Imperial Hill of Rome will remember for centuries the heroic sacrifice of the fallen for the Revolution of the Blackshirts. 28 October, Year V.	

Translations of the rest of the Hieroglyphic text on the obelisk is a pastiche of the text engraved upon the Flaminio Obelisk.

== See also ==
- List of obelisks in Rome
