= Ustrinum =

Cremation site in the Roman Empire

In ancient Roman funerals, an ustrinum (plural ustrina) was the site of a cremation funeral pyre whose ashes were removed for interment elsewhere. The ancient Greek equivalent was a καύστρα (kaustra). Ustrina could be used many times. A single-use cremation site that also functioned as a tomb was a bustum.

== Ustrina in common use ==
A single ustrinum could accommodate many successive cremations, and usually belonged to a single family. Mass cremations, in which several bodies were burned in a ustrinum simultaneously or in succession, were efficient but were used only for the poor, or during epidemics, or on battlefields. Otherwise the ustrinum was supposed to be cleared after use, to avoid the mixing of ashes from different bodies, though a few cases are known in which this was deliberately done. After a cremation, the heir of the deceased sprinkled the ashes with wine, gathered them along with any traces of bone, placed them in a cremation urn and interred them in a mausoleum or a bustum (tomb). This was sometimes done by the wife of the deceased; Livia did so with the ashes of her husband, the emperor Augustus.

== Ustrinum Domus Augustae ==
The ustrinum of the emperor Augustus, and other members of the house of Augustus, was sited in the Campus Martius, near the Mausoleum of Augustus. Strabo describes it as a travertine enclosure with a metal grating (presumably on top of the wall) and black poplars planted inside it. A fine alabaster urn and six large rectangular cippi of travertine were found in excavations in 1777 at the corner of the Corso and Via degli Otto Cantonia (now Via dei Pontefici). These cippi had inscriptions of various members of the imperial household, the three sons and one daughter of Germanicus, Tiberius the son of Drusus, and a certain Vespasianus. It is very probable that these cippi, or at any rate the first three, which all end with the formula 'hic crematus est,' belonged to the ustrinum. This would place the ustrinum on the east side of the Mausoleum. On this hypothesis, the fourth and fifth cippi, which bear the formula hic situs (or sita) est, may have belonged to the mausoleum. Hirschfeld however, excludes this possibility, mainly because of the material and form of the cippi.

== Ustrinum Antoninorum ==
The remains of an ancient Roman structure were discovered in 1703 under the Casa della Missione, just northwest of the Piazza di Monte Citorio, with an orientation like that of the columns of Antoninus and Marcus Aurelius. It consisted of three square enclosures, one within another. The two inner enclosure walls were of travertine; the outer consisted of a travertine kerb, on which stood pillars of the same material with an iron grating between them. The innermost enclosure was 13 metres square, the second 23, and the outer 30 metres square. A free space, 3 metres wide, was left between the first and second walls and between the second and third. The entrance was on the south.

Architect and topographer Francesco Bianchini named it the "ustrinum of the Antonines" on the hypothesis that it was the site of the funeral pyre for members of that dynasty. This possibility has not been seriously challenged, though it may also have been attached to the column of Antoninus as a great altar for sacrifices at the deification of the emperors. Lanciani suggests that this may have been the "ustrinum Antonini Pii et Faustinae", while another similar structure, of which the ruins were found in 1907 just a little to the north-east of the first, was the "ustrinum M. Aurelii Antonini".
