= Obelisk of Montecitorio =

Ancient Egyptian obelisk, a landmark of Rome, Italy

Obelisk of Montecitorio (a.k.a. The Solar Obelisk)
- Obelisco di Montecitorio (Obelisco Solare)
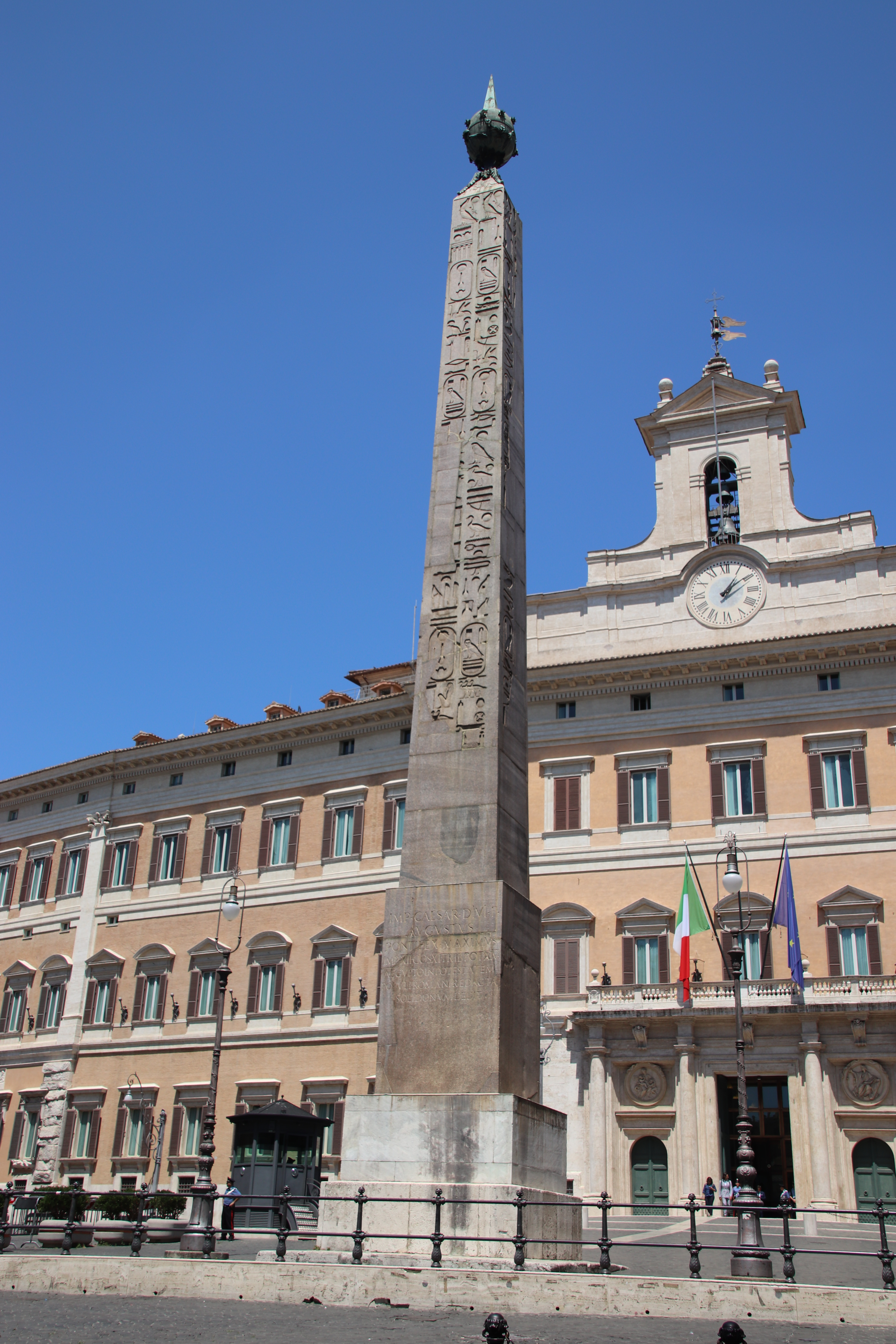
- Egyptian Obelisk Solare, Psammeticus II, Heliopolis, Taken by Augustus in 10 BC
- Interactive map of Obelisk of Montecitorio (a.k.a. The Solar Obelisk)
- Location: Piazza di Monte Citorio, Rome, Italy
- Coordinates: 41°54′02″N 12°28′43″E
- Designer: Commissioned by Psamtik II, (26th Dynasty)
- Type: Obelisk
- Material: Red Granite from Aswan
- Height: 21.79 metres (71.5 ft); (33.97 metres (111.5 ft) including its pedestal and Globe)
- Weight: c.214 long tons (217 t)
- Beginning date: Unknown, c. 595–589BCE under Psalmtik II
- Completion date: Unknown, c. 595–589BCE under Psalmtik II
- Restored date: 1748 rediscovered under Benedict XIV, 1792 Re-erected by Pius IV
- Dedicated to: Re in Heliopolis; Sol under Augustus.
- Dismantled date: Unknown. Collapsed some time after the Fall of Rome

The Obelisk of Montecitorio (Italian: Obelisco di Montecitorio), also known as Solare, is an ancient Egyptian, red granite obelisk of Psamtik II (595–589 BC) from Heliopolis. Brought to Rome with the Flaminio Obelisk in 10 BC by the Roman Emperor Augustus to be used as the gnomon of the Solarium Augusti, it is now in the Piazza Montecitorio. It is 21.79 metres (71 ft) high, and 33.97 metres (111 ft) including the base and the globe.

== History ==
=== First construction ===
The stone was quarried at Aswan and then transported to, and erected at, the sanctuary of Ra in Heliopolis during the reign of Psamtik II (595–589 BC).

The hieroglyphic inscription on the sides reads

The Golden Horus, beautifying the Two Lands, beloved of Atum, lord of Heliopolis; the King of Upper and Lower Egypt, Neferibre, beloved of Re-Harakhti; the son of his own body, who seizes the White Crown and who unites the Double Crown, Psammetikos, beloved of the Souls of Heliopolis.

and the inscription on the Pyramidion reads

King of Upper and Lower Egypt, <good heart of Re> son of Re <Psamchek II> life for ever and ever give him all life and all health for ever Re Horachty great god lord of the sky I gave thee all life and dominion, all health, and all joy for ever

=== Second construction ===
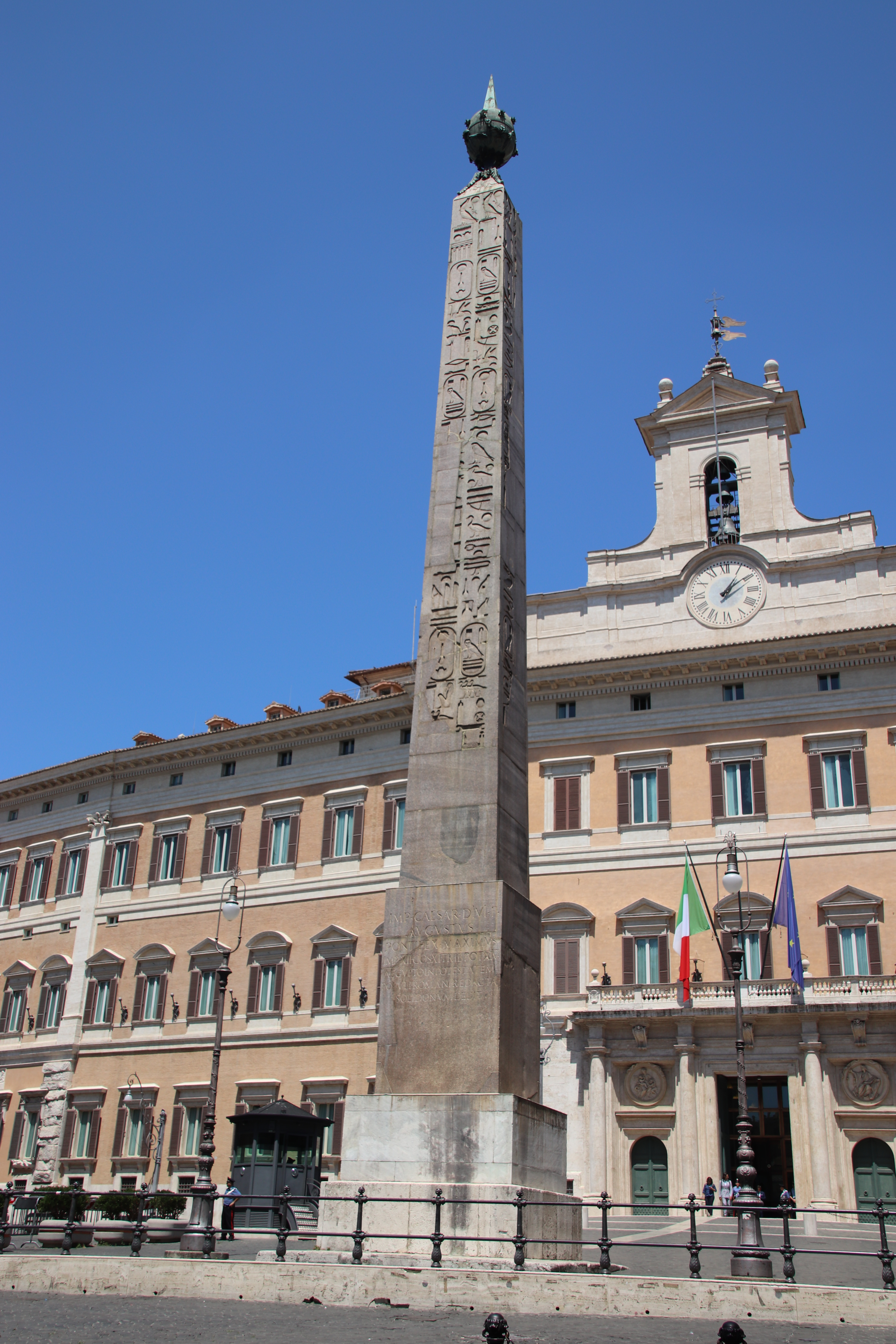
Obelisk of Pharao Psamtik II, now called "Obelisk of Montecitorio", used as a Roman sundial, the famous Horologium Augusti, in Rome. In the background is the Italian Chamber of Deputies building

In 10 BCE, Emperor Augustus ordered this and the Flaminio Obelisk to be brought to Rome. It was erected as the gnomon of the Solarium Augusti, his giant sundial (or horologium) in the Campus Martius. The meridian, worked out by the mathematician Facondius Novus, was placed in the center of a surface measuring 160 by 75 metres (525 by 246 ft), constructed from slabs of travertine, on which a quadrant was marked out with bronze letters, with indications of the hours, months, seasons and signs of the zodiac. Besides its function as a solar clock, the obelisk was oriented in such manner so as to cast its shadow on the nearby Ara Pacis on 23 September, Augustus's birthday, which coincided with the autumnal equinox. The reason for this orientation of the sunlight alludes to the peace that Augustus had always strived for by directing the light to the Ara Pacis, Pax the Roman goddess of peace is being highlighted. This orientation “sanctioned his divine right to rule” and “possibly his right to establish a dynasty.”

A detailed description that gives us the typology, appearance and formal operating procedure of this imposing solar meridian is supplied from Pliny the Elder (Naturalis historia 36, 71–72): "The one [obelisk] in the Campus was put to use in a remarkable way by divine Augustus so as to mark the sun's shadow and thereby the lengths of days"

The inscription written on two sides of the obelisk's base runs as follows:

Text of Augustus' Dedication
Text	Expansion	Translation	Source
IMP·CAESAR·DIVI·F; AVGVSTVS; PONTIFEX MAXIMVS; IMP·XII·COS·XI·TRIB·POT·XIV; AEGYPTO·IN·POTESTATEM; POPULI·ROMANI·REDACTA; SOLI·DONUM·DEDIT	Imperator Caesar, Divi filius, Augustus, Pontifex Maximus, Imperator XII, Consul XI, Tribunicia Potestate XIV, Aegypto in potestatem Populi Romani redacta, Soli donum dedit.	Imperator Caesar Augustus, son of the divine Julius Caesar Pontifex maximus, acclaimed Imperator twelve times, Consul eleven times, holding Tribunician power for the fourteenth time, after Egypt had been brought under the power of the Roman people, gave this [obelisk] as a gift to the Sun. Alternatively: Imperator Caesar, son of the deified (Julius Caesar), Augustus, Supreme Pontiff, proclaimed Imperator twelve times, Consul eleven times, holding Tribunician Power fourteen times, having reduced Egypt into the sovereignty of the Roman people, gave this gift to the sun.	

However, according to Pliny, the original horologic stopped working 30 years after its construction (that is, by the 40s AD).

=== Later history ===
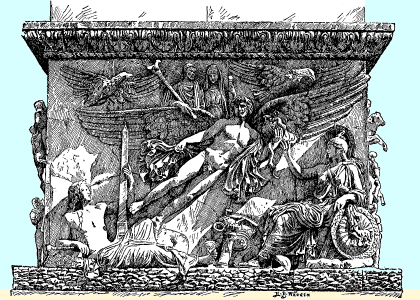
The base of the column of Antoninus, with the personification of the Campus Martius, reclining, left

Augustus's decision to erect the obelisks in Rome inspired future rulers of Rome to do the same. Some of these rulers that would follow suit are Hadrian and Domitian. Both of them would erect more obelisks throughout Rome, each one with a different meaning.

Between the 9th and 11th centuries, probably because of fire, earthquake (perhaps the earthquake of 849) or war (e.g. during the siege of Rome of 1084 by Robert Guiscard), the obelisk collapsed and then, progressively, became buried. Pope Sixtus V (1520–1590) made some attempts to repair and raise the obelisk, reassembling some pieces that had been found in 1502 in a cellar off the "Largo dell'Impresa", the present Piazza del Parlamento. After this fruitless attempt, some traces of the meridian were recovered during the pontificate of Benedict XIV in 1748, who found parts of it under the main entrance of Piazza del Parlamento 3, sited just as in Pliny's description. The obelisk and the meridian were not originally located in the position in which they were re-erected by the popes, but in the space behind the Curia innocenziana (now called Palazzo Montecitorio). Under the cellar of a stable on a street in the Campus Martius, a piece of the meridian was excavated, with the markings for various months in Greek letters set into the travertine slabs. Another fragment was hypothesized to be contained in the mosaic still visible in the foundation of the Church of San Lorenzo in Lucina.

From 1789 to 1792, Pope Pius VI carried out intensive works to repair the obelisk, which was later raised and restored as a sundial. The direction of the restoration work was entrusted to the architect Giovanni Antinori, who restored the obelisk using granite from the Column of Antoninus Pius. This column's base, with its famous relief showing the Solar obelisk held as a symbol of the Campus Martius regio by a personification of the Campus, is still preserved in the Vatican Museums.

In the new layout of Piazza Montecitorio (inaugurated on 7 June 1998), a new meridian was traced on the pavement in honor of Augustus's meridian, pointing towards the main entrance of the palazzo. Unfortunately, the shadow of the obelisk does not point precisely in that direction, and its gnomonic function is definitively lost.

== See also ==
- Lateran Obelisk – Ancient Egyptian obelisk, now a landmark of Rome, Italy
- List of obelisks in Rome
- List of Egyptian obelisks

== Notes ==
Preceded by Elephant and Obelisk	Landmarks of Rome; Obelisk of Montecitorio	Succeeded by Arch of Constantine
