= Giovanni Vignoli =

Italian archeologist and numismatist

Giovanni Vignoli (1680 – 1753) was an Italian ecclesiastic, archeologist, librarian, and numismatist.

Vignoli was born in Pitigliano, and was ordained there a cleric. He served as librarian for the Vatican Library in 1720. He died in Rome.

== Works ==
- Dissertatio de columna imperatoris Antonini Pii, una cum antiquis inscriptionibus, ecc. (Rome, 1703, in quarto)
- Antiquiores pontificum denarii (Rome, 1709, in quarto)
- Vite dei pontefici di Anastasio bibliotecario, completed by his nephew Ugolini and Padre Baldini in Rome, 1724, 1753 e 1785, in 3 volumes in quarto.
