= Solarium Augusti =

Roman solar marker in the Campus Martius

Coordinates: 41°54′11.39″N 12°28′42.75″E

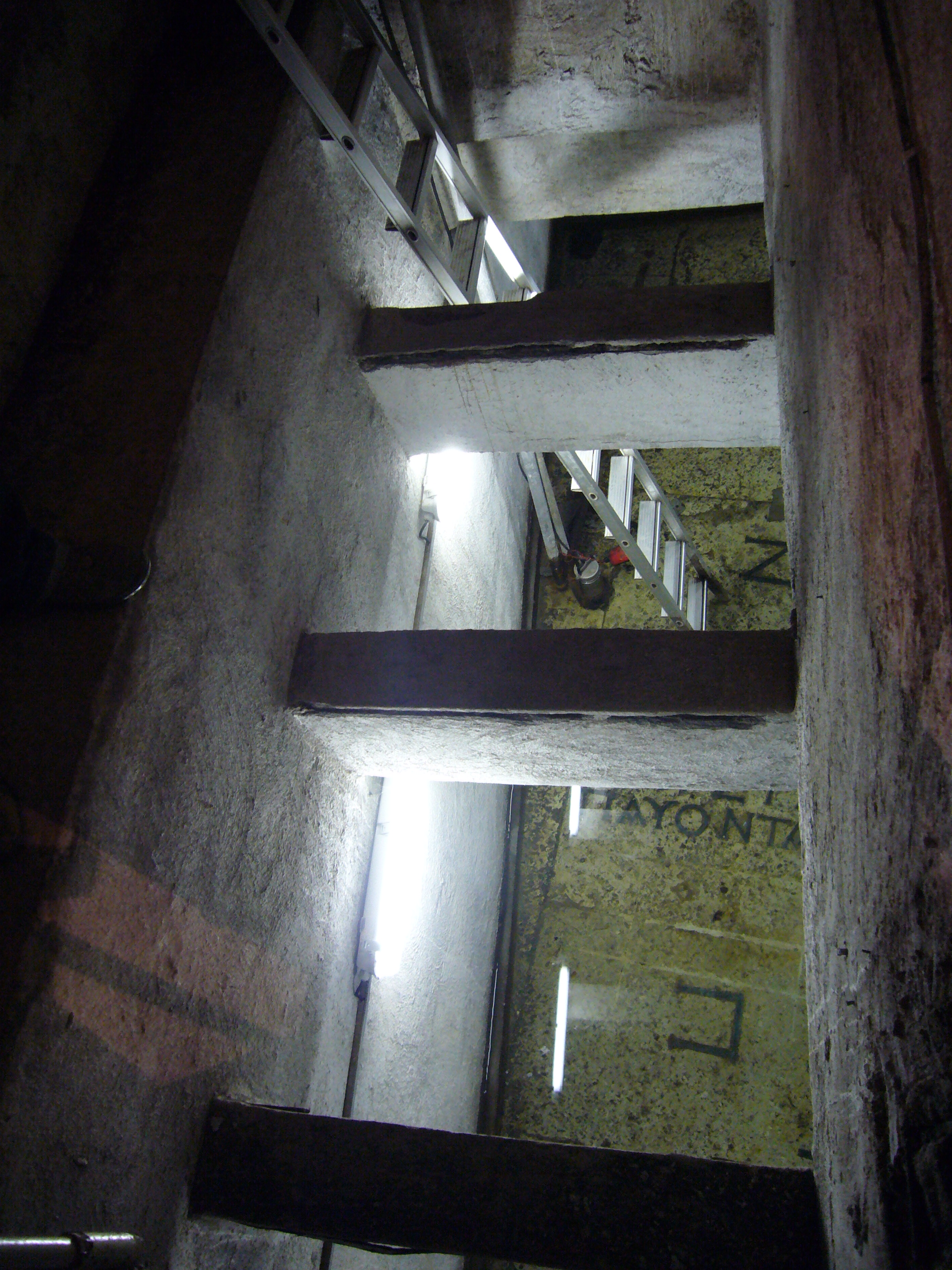
Part of the meridian under the cellar of a stable building in the Campus Martius.

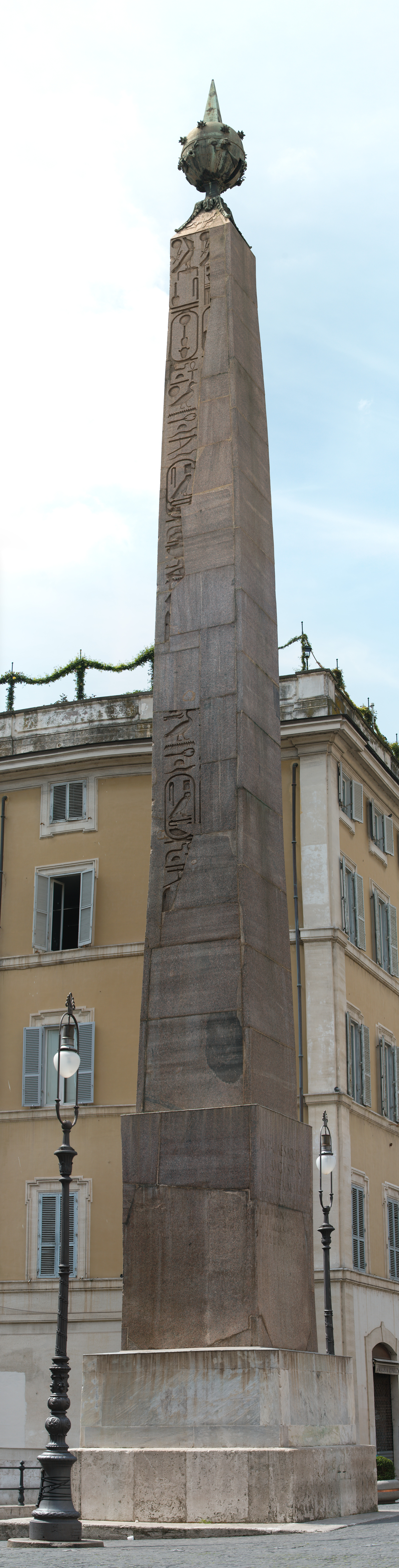
The Obelisk of Montecitorio gnomon, in present Piazza di Montecitorio location.

The Solarium Augusti or Horologium Augusti (both Latin for "Sundial of Augustus"; Italian: Orologio di Augusto) was a monument in the Campus Martius of ancient Rome constructed in 10 BCE under the Roman emperor Augustus. It included an Egyptian obelisk that had first been erected under the pharaoh Psamtik II used in some fashion as a gnomon. Once believed to have been a massive sundial, it is now more commonly understood to have been used with a meridian line used to track the solar year. It served as a monument of Augustus having brought Egypt under Roman rule and was also connected with the Altar of Augustan Peace commemorating the Pax Romana established by his ending the numerous civil wars that ended the Roman Republic. The Solarium was destroyed at some point during the Middle Ages. Its recovered obelisk is now known as the Obelisk of Montecitorio.

== History ==
It was erected by the emperor Augustus, with the 30-meter Egyptian red granite Obelisk of Montecitorio, that he had brought from Heliopolis in ancient Egypt. The obelisk was employed as a gnomon that cast its shadow on a marble pavement inlaid with a gilded bronze network of lines, by which it was possible to read the time of day according to the season of the year. The solarium was dedicated to the Sun in 10 BCE, 35 years after Julius Caesar's calendar reform. It was the first solar dedication in Rome.

The Solarium Augusti was integrated with the Ara Pacis in the Campus Martius, aligning with Via Flaminia, in such a way that the shadow of the gnomon fell across the center of the marble altar on 23 September, the birthday of Augustus himself. The obelisk itself was set up to memorialize Augustus' subordination of Egypt to the control of the Roman empire. The two monuments must have been planned together, in relation to the pre-existing Mausoleum of Augustus, to demonstrate that Augustus was "born to bring peace", that peace was his destiny. According to the Cambridge Ancient History, "the collective message dramatically linked peace with military authority and imperial expansion."

In his Natural History, Pliny remarks that in the monument had stopped accurately reflecting the solar year by about 40 CE and offers several explanations for the shift, including that the sun, the earth, or both might not be as fixed in their position and movement as was usually believed at the time. The obelisk was illustrated, supported by a reclining figure, on the base of the Column of Antoninus Pius.

The obelisk gnomon was still standing in the 8th century CE, but was thrown down and broken, then covered in sediment; it was rediscovered in 1512, but not excavated. In a triumphant rededication, the 'Montecitorio obelisk' was re-erected in Piazza di Montecitorio by Pius VI in 1789.

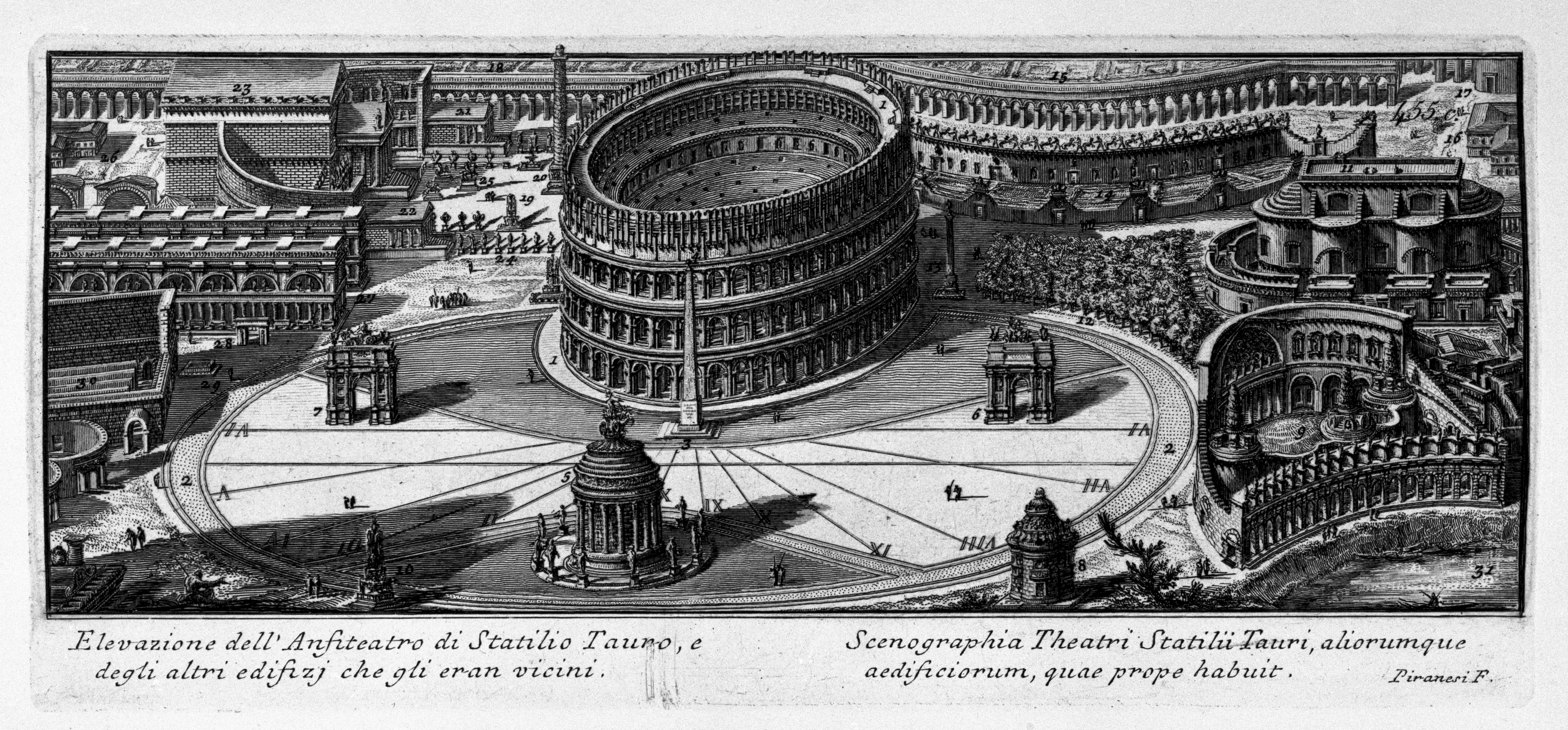
18th Century Depiction of the horologium of Augustus on an engraving dating by Giovanni Battista

In 1979, a section of the ancient paving of the square was found at a depth of 8 metre pit inside a series of vaults in the Campo Marzio, bearing a calibrated line and inscriptions in Greek referring to zodiac symbols.

The ancient consecration inscription has been maintained and reads:

IMP CAESAR DIVI F
AUGUST

PONTIFEX MAXIMUS
IMP XII COS XI TRIB POT XIV
AEGUPTO IN POTESTATEM
POPULI ROMANI REDACTA
SOLI DONUM DEDIT

Imperator Caesar son of a deified Augustus

pontifex maximus
12 times imperator, 11 times consul, 14 times (clothed with) tribunicia potestas.
After Egypt was brought under the authority
of the Roman people
he gave (this obelisk) to the sun

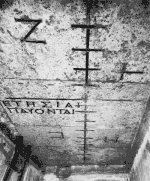
Fragment of the meridian, in a cellar at no. 48, Via di Campo Marzio.

== Archaeology ==
Edmund Buchner excavated some sections of the calibrated marble pavement of the Solarium Augusti under the block of houses between Piazza del Parlamento and Piazza San Lorenzo in Lucina. Recent studies have challenged Buchner's reconstruction of the Solarium as a full sundial, maintaining that the archaeological and textual evidence indicates a simple meridian line, marking the changing noontime position of the Sun in the course of the year.

== See also ==
- Obelisks of Rome

== Notes ==
=== References ===
- The broad context of the Augustan iconographic program, of which the Solarium Augusti is part, is presented in The Power of Images in the Age of Augustus by Paul Zanker; University of Michigan Press; 1988.
