= Column of Antoninus Pius =

Honorific column devoted to Roman emperor Antoninus Pius

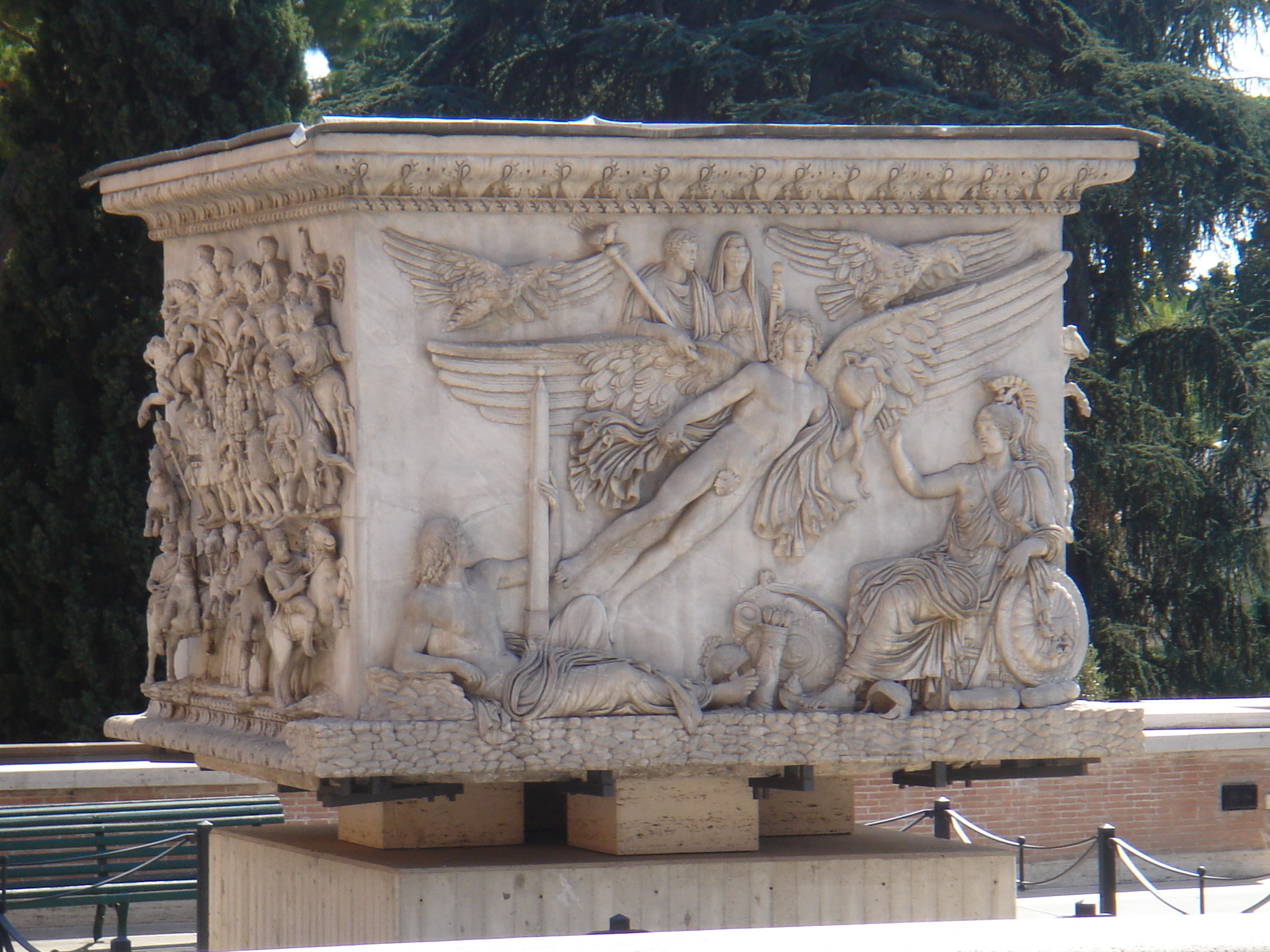
- The base today

- Shown within Augustan Rome
- Interactive map of Column of Antoninus Pius
- 41°54′06″N 12°28′34″E

The Column of Antoninus Pius (Italian: Colonna di Antonino Pio) is a Roman honorific column in Rome, Italy, devoted in AD 161 to the Roman emperor Antoninus Pius, in the Campus Martius, on the edge of the hill now known as Monte Citorio, and set up by his successors, the co-emperors Marcus Aurelius and Lucius Verus. The column itself is now destroyed, but its base is preserved.

== History ==
=== Construction ===
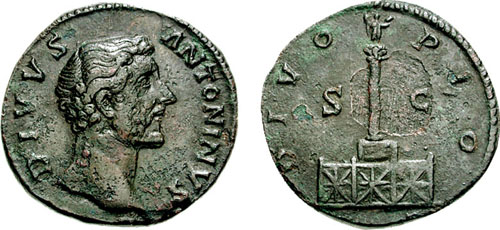
Coin showing the column with surmounting statue of Antoninus

The column itself was 14.75 metres (48.4 ft) high and 1.9 metres (6 ft 3 in) in diameter and constructed of red Aswan granite. It was monolithic with no decorating reliefs, unlike the multi-drum marble columns of Trajan and Marcus Aurelius. It was quarried out in 106 (as shown by the masons' inscription on its lower end, IG xiv.2421.1). Architecturally, it belonged to the Ustrinum Antoninorum, 25 metres (82 ft) north of it on the same orientation, with the main apotheosis scene facing in that direction, and was surmounted by a statue of Antoninus, as is represented on coins issued after his death (Cohen, Ant. Pius 353‑6).

=== Rediscovery ===
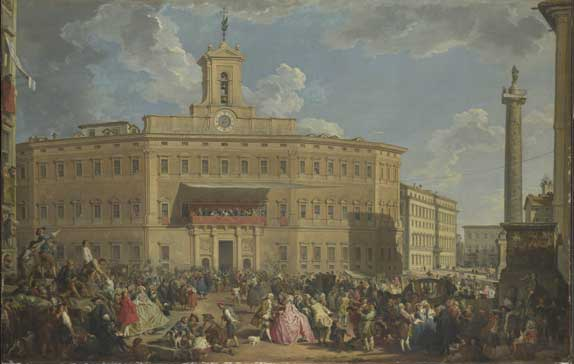
The column's base (right foreground, showing one of the decursio sides), in Panini's 1747 painting of the Palazzo Montecitorio, with the Column of Marcus Aurelius in the background.

Previous to the 18th century the base was completely buried, but the lower part of the shaft projected about 6m above the ground. In 1703, when some buildings were demolished in the area of Montecitorio, the rest of the column and the base were discovered and excavated. The column was raised from the ground by Carlo Fontana's son Francesco (1668–1708), but no decision was made about its use. It remained lying on the ground under some sheds, and was damaged by fire in 1759. Unsuccessful attempts were made to repair it soon afterwards in 1764, with some pieces from it being used in 1789 to restore the obelisk of Augustus that is now in the Piazza di Monte Citorio.

Meanwhile, the base (of white Italian marble) was restored in 1706–08 and erected in the centre of Piazza di Montecitorio by Ferdinando Fuga in 1741, before being taken to the Vatican Museums in 1787, where it has been in the Michelangelo niche in the Cortile della Pigna from 1885 until its final move to its current position in the courtyard outside the entrance to the Vatican Pinacoteca.

== Base iconography ==
One side of the base has a dedicatory inscription (CIL vi.1004), two sides record the funerary decursio or decursus (a ceremony performed by the Roman cavalry), and one side shows the apotheosis or ascent to the gods of the emperor and his wife.

=== Apotheosis scene ===
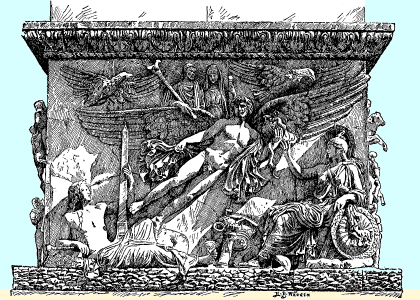
The apotheosis scene

A winged genius, sometimes identified as Aion, (Eternity) carries Antoninus and his wife Faustina to Heaven. The Emperor holds a sceptre crowned with an eagle, whilst eagles also fly upwards with them.

The personified male figure (left) holding the obelisk represents the Campus Martius. Augustus had placed this obelisk there as a sundial and it was the site of the ritual of imperial deification ceremonies. The personified female figure in armour (right) saluting the emperor and empress represents Roma, and her shield depicts the legendary founders of Rome, Romulus and Remus, suckled by a she-wolf.

=== Decursio ===
On these two almost identical sides, members of the cavalry circle the standing figures, two carrying military standards and the rest fully armored. Lacking a sense of space and perspective, these scenes are often criticized for their lack of stylistic sophistication. Instead of naturalism, both a bird's eye view of the circular manoeuvre and a ground-level view of each figure are provided. The repetition of the scenes can best be explained by the fact that Antoninus Pius was succeeded by two emperors, Marcus Aurelius and Lucius Verus, who reigned jointly until the latter died. The decursio depictions, as well as the language on the inscription, can be taken to show a stable and justified transition to the two co-rulers.

== Sources ==
- Amelung, Walther (1903). Die Sculpturen des Vaticanischen Museums (in German). Vol. 1. G. Reimer. p. 883‑893.
- Lanciani, Rodolfo (1907). Storia degli scavi di Roma e notizie intorno le collezioni romane di antichità (in Italian). Vol. 3. Rome: E. Loescher & Co. p. 145.
- Platner, Samuel Ball; Ashby, Thomas (1929). "Columna Antonini Pii". A Topographical Dictionary of Ancient Rome. London: Oxford University Press. p. 131.
- Ridley, Ronald T. (2018). "The Fate of the Column of Antoninus Pius". Papers of the British School at Rome. 86: 235–269. JSTOR 26579510.
- Strong, Eugenia (1923). La scultura romana da Augusto a Costantino (in Italian). Florence: Fratelli Alinari.
- Vogel, Lise (1973). The Column of Antoninus Pius. Harvard University Press.

Preceded by Villa dei Sette Bassi	Landmarks of Rome; Column of Antoninus Pius	Succeeded by Column of Marcus Aurelius
