= Villa dei Sette Bassi =

Roman villa in Rome, Italy

Villa of the Sette Bassi
- Villa della Via Tuscolana
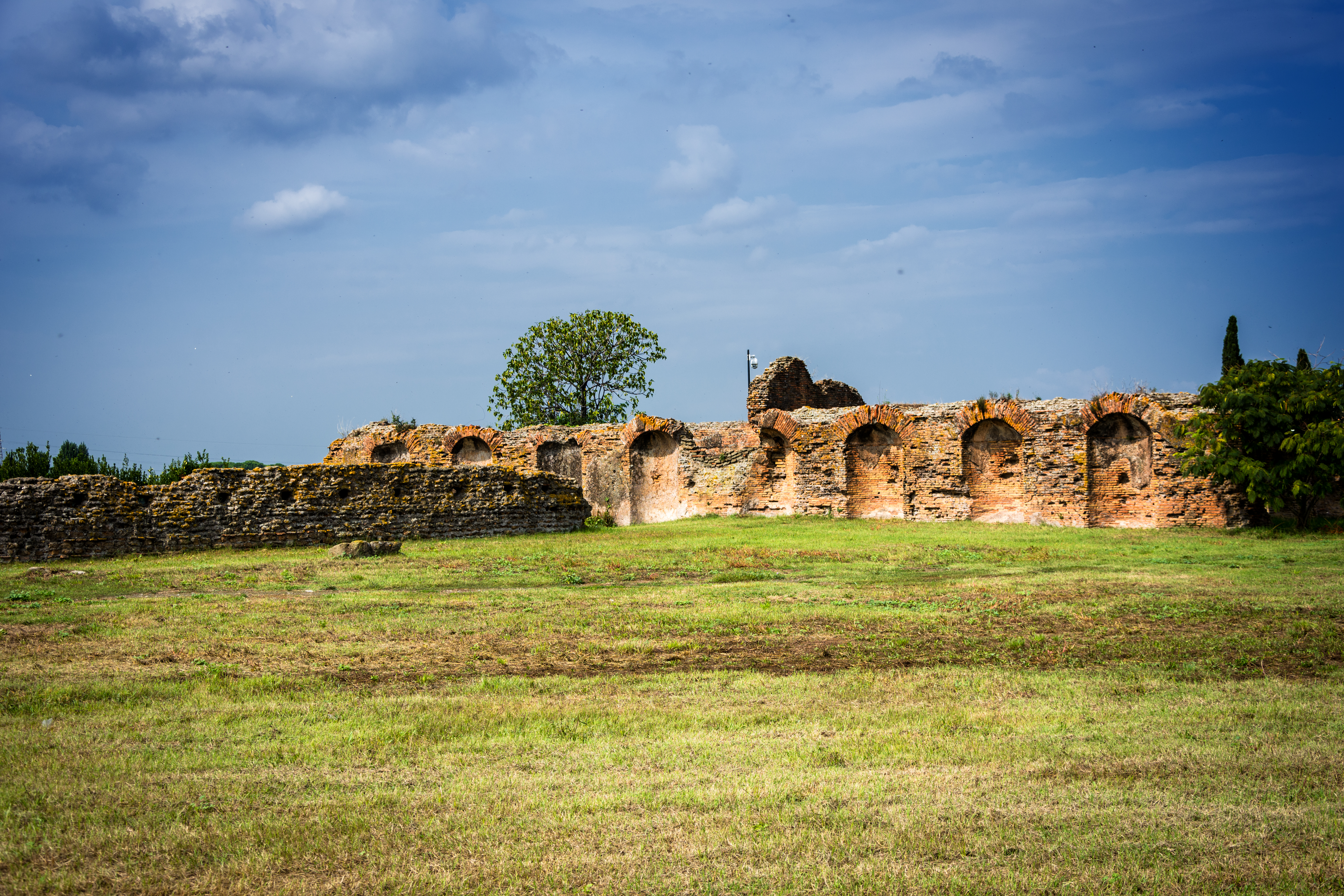
- Interactive map of Villa of the Sette Bassi
- 41°50′34″N 12°34′34″E
- Periods: Roman Imperial
- Cultures: Roman
- Location: Rome, Italy
- Region: Lazio

Site notes
- Condition: Ruined
- Owner: Public
- Public access: On request. Visible from the exterior boundary.

The Villa dei Sette Bassi (also Villa Via Tuscolana) was the second-largest ancient Roman villa or monumental palace in the suburbs after the Villa of the Quintilii.

The site is on a hilly plateau located at the fifth mile of Via Tuscolana to the southeast of Rome and forms part of the Appia Antica archaeological park. The name, known since the Middle Ages, is probably derived from the emperor Lucius Septimius Bassianus known as Caracalla (r. 198–217) and not from Septimius Bassus, prefect under the Emperor Septimius Severus (r.193–211) (Caracalla's father). Indeed, it seems that Caracalla had merged the villa of the Sette Bassi and the villa of the Quintilii into a single vast imperial estate.

It was inhabited until the beginning of the fourth century, and maintained by additional restorations for two more centuries.

Six Roman marble sculptures from the site can be found in the British Museum.

== The Site ==
The original access to the villa must have been in the south-west area, where there are remains of richly decorated rooms near the byway coming from the Via Latina.

The residential area consists of three contiguous parts, dating to three different periods in rapid succession. The parts are rectangular and are arranged aligned from east to west. There were also gardens and a main park onto which the buildings looked. The easternmost building was built between 134 and 139 at the beginning of the reign of Antoninus Pius following a traditional structure of 50 m on each side and a peristyle in the northwest of about 45 m per side. The plan is compact, with no windows facing outward. The second building was constructed to the southwest of the previous peristyle, between 140 and 150. It measures 45 x 25 m and includes a panoramic south-facing rotunda. It is a structure linked to luxury, without any functional character. The third structure is believed to have been constructed at the end of the reign of Antoninus Pius, and is the most elaborate with large spa rooms.

The large rectangular circus or hippodrome-garden, similar in concept to those at the imperial residences of the Villa of Domitian and the Palace of Domitian, was 95 x 327 m, terraced and surrounded by a cryptoporticus, and must have contained mirrors of water, avenues, ornamental buildings, statues, fountains.

The water requirement was satisfied by a branch from the Anio Novus aqueduct which fed a complex system of cisterns, one of which with two floors. Remains of one of the cisterns form the foundations of a farmhouse on the property.

To the northwest of the villa was the pars rustica of the villa, a series of houses where the service staff lived with warehouses, temples and cisterns and where most of the domestic and agricultural activities took place. The area has not been the subject of archaeological investigation but remains of a small temple identified with a nymphaeum are clearly visible. This was rectangular and constructed of brick, had vaulted ceilings and was gabled. It contained a rectangular apse for the Divine Statue.

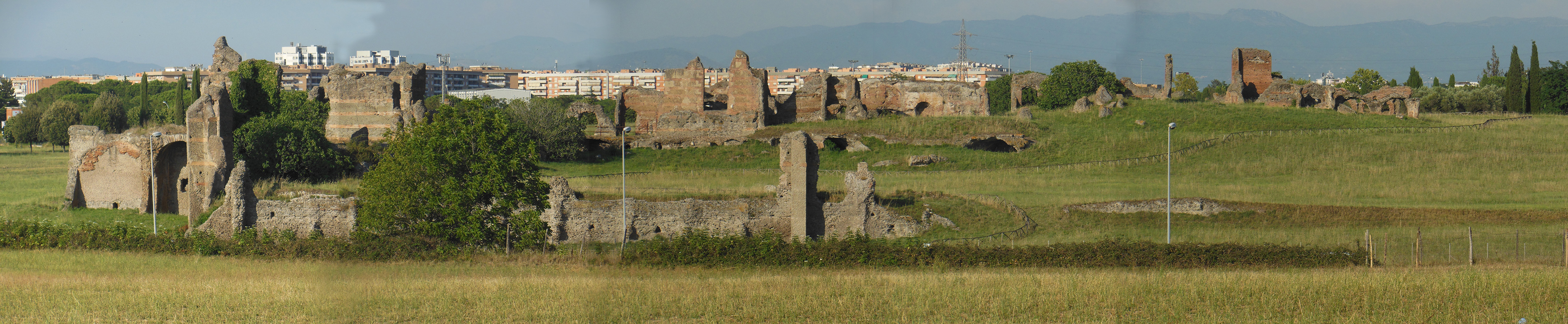
Panorama

The condition of these ruins is poor. In February 2014 a buttress collapsed. This was attributed to heavy rain but excavations have shown that the building materials used were of low quality. Also the area was subjected to some bombing during the Second World War.

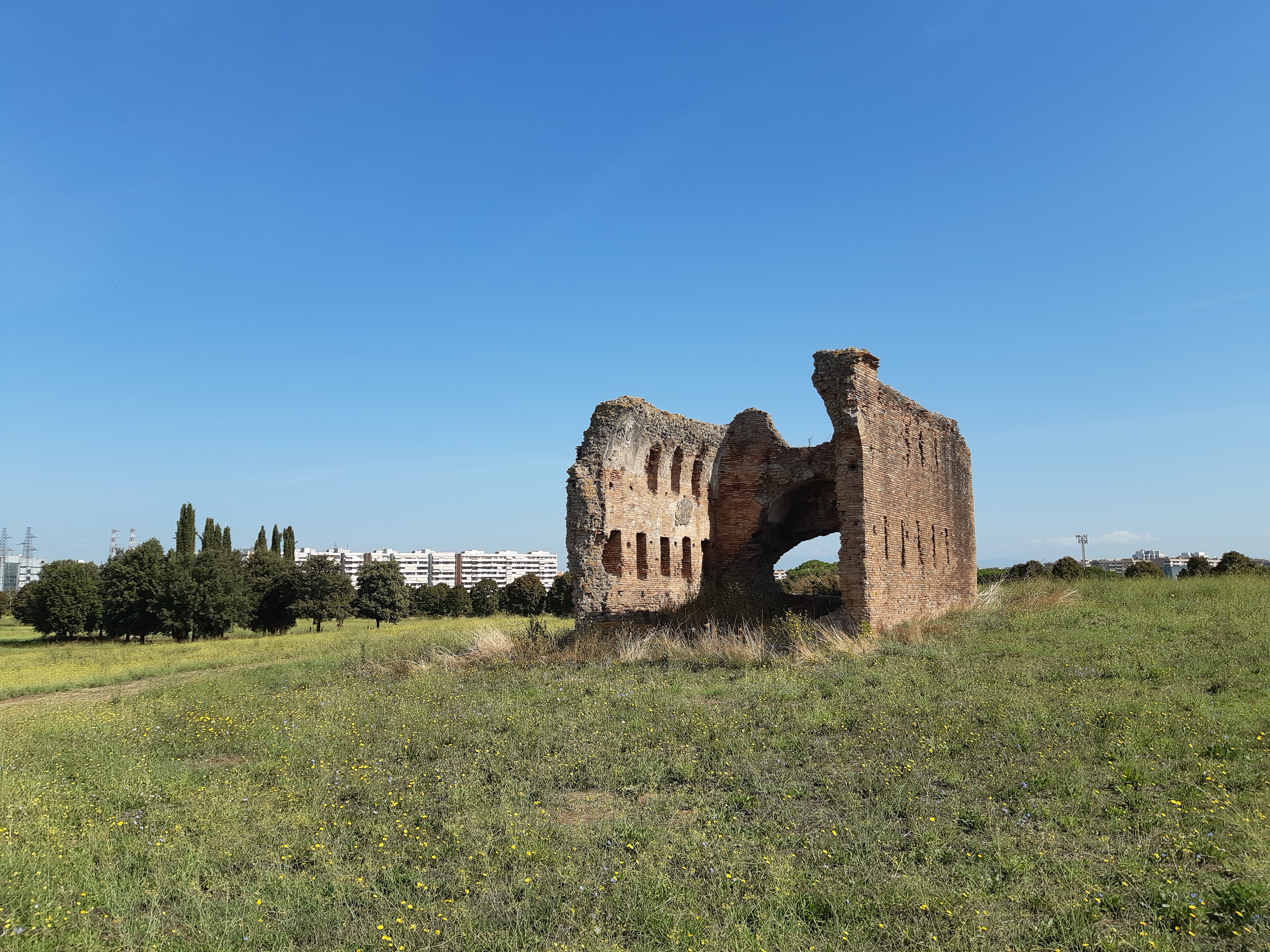
temple of the villa

== Gallery ==
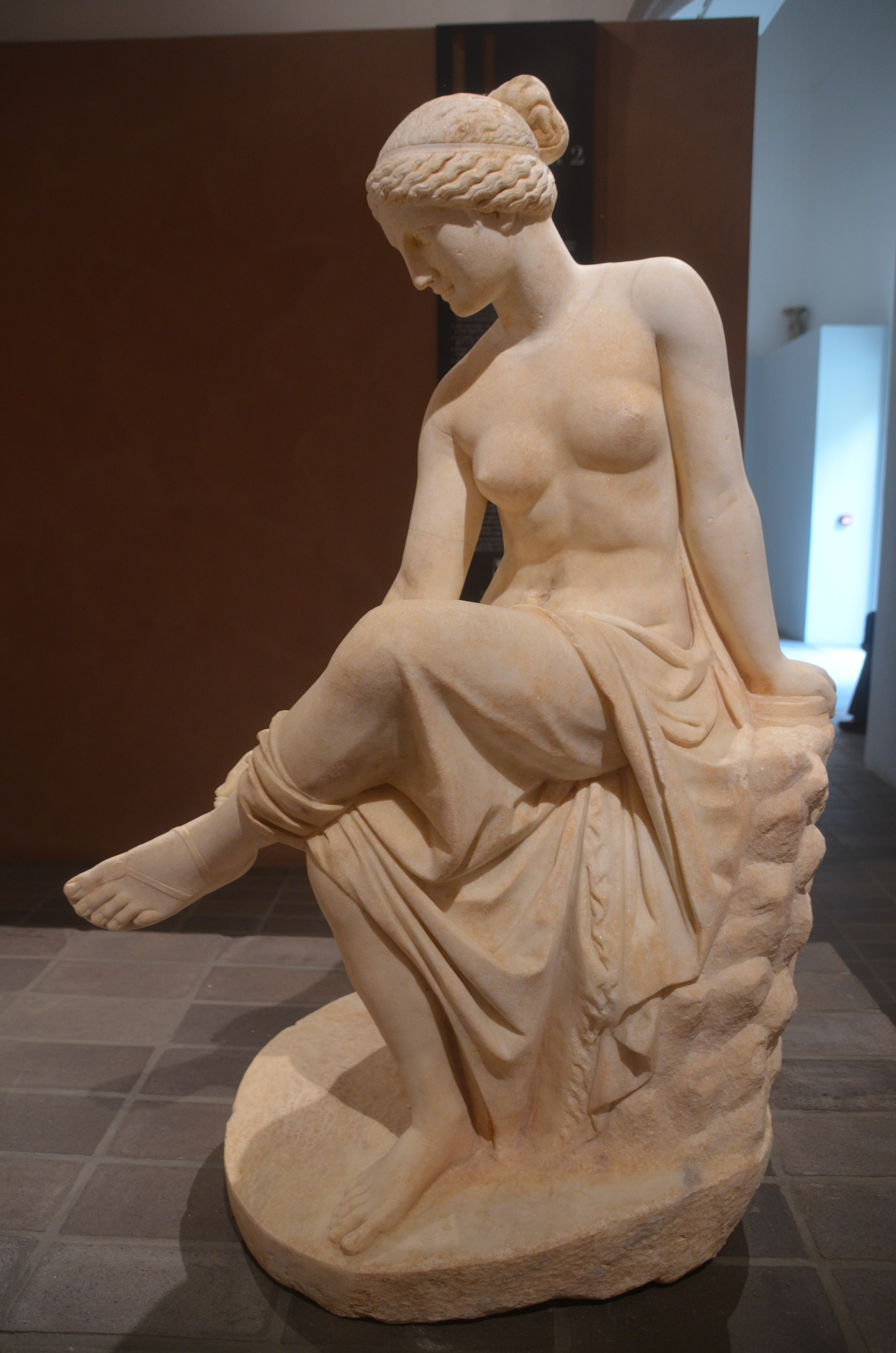
Nymph from the villa, 90-110 AD replica of Greek original of 2nd c. BC, Torlonia collection

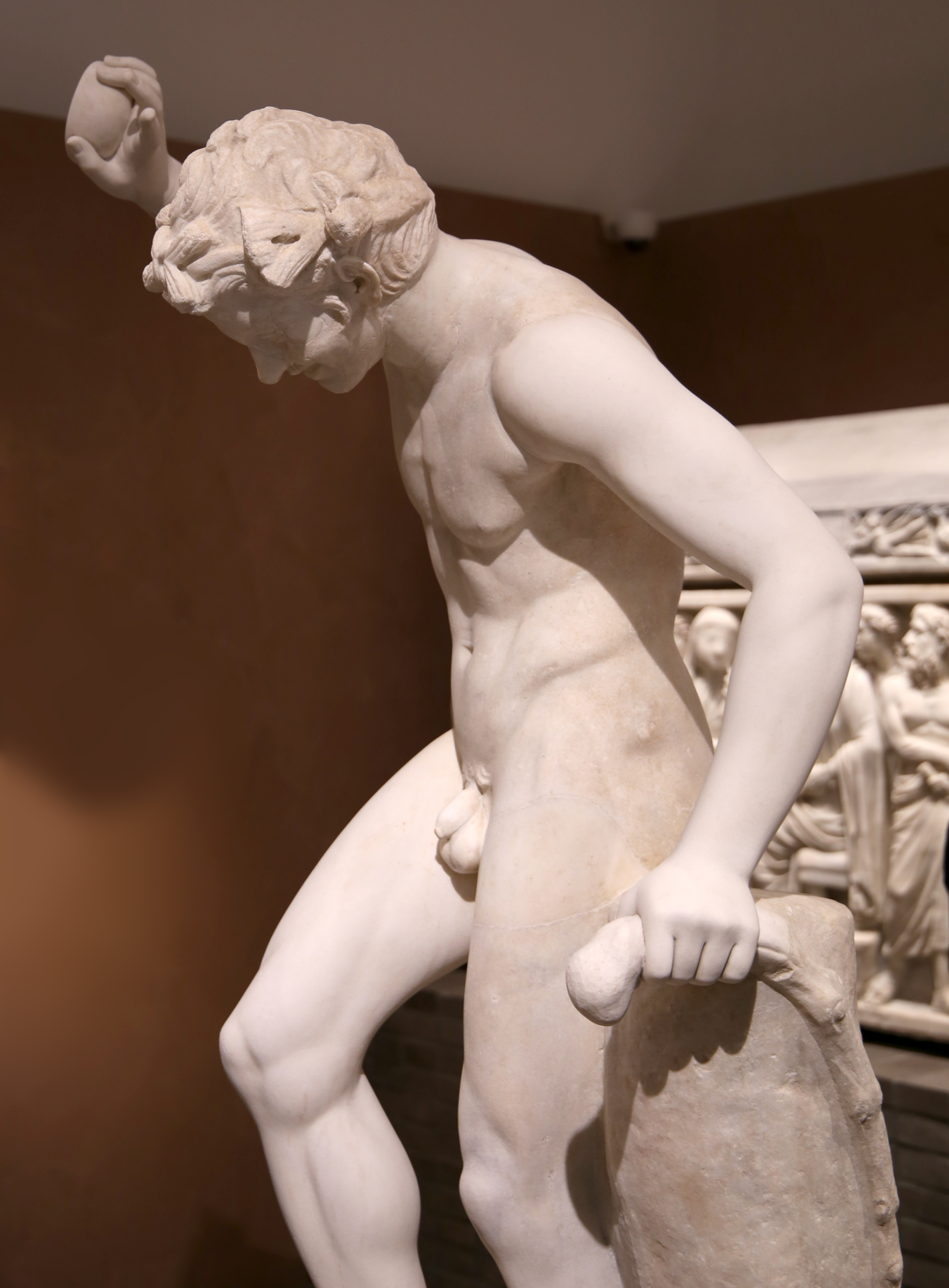
Satyr, 1st c. AD replica of Greek original of 2nd c. BC, Torlonia collection

== See also ==
- Appian Way Regional Park

== Bibliography ==
- R. Egidi, "Villa dei Sette Bassi," in C. Kicking, Rome archaeological, Rome 2005, p. 442-444.
- M. De Franceschini, "Villa Via Tuscolana, the Seven Netherlands", in Ville Agro Romano, Rome 2005, p. 209-214.W

Preceded by Villa of the Quintilii	Landmarks of Rome; Villa dei Sette Bassi	Succeeded by Column of Antoninus Pius
