= Flaminio Obelisk =

Ancient Egyptian monument in Rome, Italy

The Flaminian Obelisk
- Obelisco Flaminio
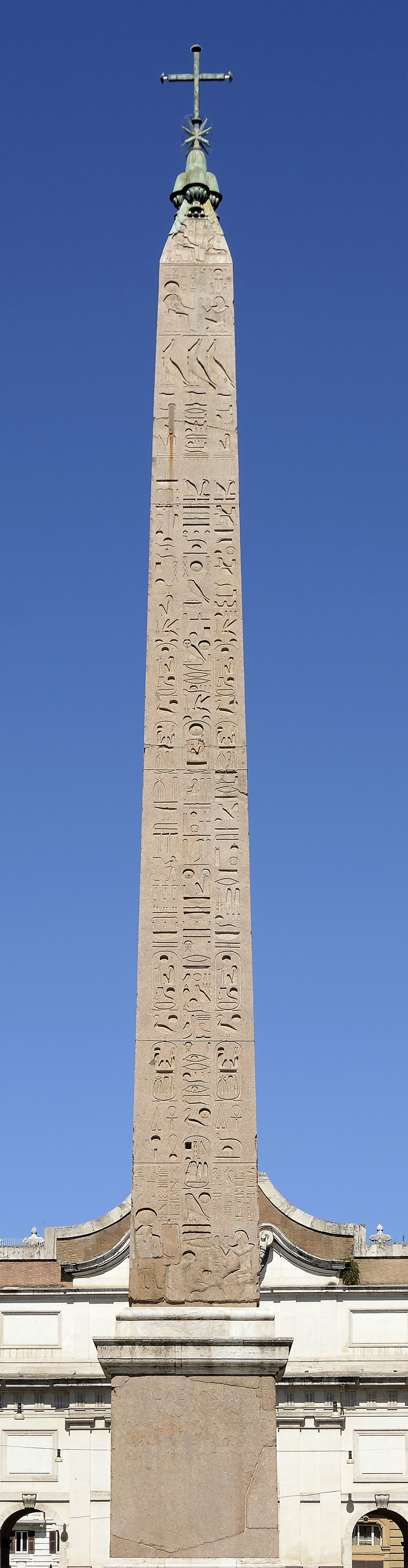
- The Flaminio Obelisk.
- Interactive map of The Flaminian Obelisk
- Location: Piazza del Popolo, Rome, Italy
- Coordinates: 41°54′39″N 12°28′35″E
- Designer: Commissioned by Pharaoh Seti I and completed under Rameses II (19th Dynasty)
- Type: Egyptian Monolithic Obelisk
- Material: Red Aswan Granite
- Height: 25.9 metres (85 ft), with its base and cross 36.5 metres (120 ft)
- Weight: 235 tonnes (231 long tons; 259 short tons)
- Beginning date: c.1290–1279 BCE (The reign of Seti I)
- Completion date: c.1279-1213 BCE (The reign of Rameses II)
- Dedicated date: 13th Century BCE, Temple of Re, Heliopolis; c.10 BCE, Circus Maximus, Rome; 1589 CE, Piazza del Popolo, Rome
- Restored date: Re-assembled and re-erected in 1589 by Sixtus V, Renovated 1823 by Leo XII
- Dedicated to: Initially Ra; Under Augustus, Sol; Presently to the True cross
- Dismantled date: After the Fall of Rome, shattered into 3 pieces.

The Flaminio Obelisk (Italian: Obelisco Flaminio) is one of the thirteen ancient obelisks in Rome, Italy, and probably either the most ancient, or second most ancient. It is located in the Flaminio quarter on Piazza del Popolo, and named not just for the quarter, but the Flaminian Way, which began near by. Initially it stood at the Temple of Re, in Heliopolis (now a suburb of Cairo), before being moved to Rome after Caesar Augustus' conquest of Egypt, and previously stood in the Circus Maximus with another ancient Egyptian obelisk, the Campense Obelisk, presently located in Piazza di Monte Citorio, before being moved to its present location by Sixtus V in the 16th Century.

It is 24 m (67 ft) high and with the base and the cross reaches 36.50 m (100 ft).

== History ==
The Nineteenth Dynasty pharaoh Seti I quarried this obelisk from granite quarries in Aswan. Before his death, artists inscribed three of the four faces of the obelisk, which Seti intended to erect in the Temple of Re in Heliopolis. Seti's son and successor Ramesses II completed its inscriptions and set it up in Heliopolis.

=== Egypt to Rome ===
It was taken from Egypt in c.1 BC by command of Augustus (together with the Obelisk of Montecitorio). It was installed on the spina of the Circus Maximus, followed three centuries later by the Lateran Obelisk. Like most Egyptian obelisks, the Flaminio Obelisk was probably one of a pair, but no trace of its companion has been found. In Seti I's dedicatory inscription on one side of the shaft, the king boasts that he would "fill Heliopolis with obelisks."

When Augustus decided to dedicate this obelisk he chose to maintain its dedication to the deification of the Sun which corresponded to Apollo, the tutelary deity of the emperor, and had dedications inscribed on two sides of the plinth supporting it. It is uncertain exactly when the obelisk fell, however at some point after the fall of Rome, it fell and broke into three pieces, along with the other obelisk present in the Circus Maximus. The obelisks vanished into mud after the Circus had fallen into ruins as a stream (Acqua Mariana), which passed through the area made the area sodden after it was made into a channel under Callistus II c. 1122 CE.

=== The Circus Maximus to Piazza del Popolo ===
The obelisk was rediscovered and excavated in 1471 by the architect Leon Battista Alberti during construction work on Piazza Navona. The obelisk received new attention in 1587 under Pope Sixtus V, during whose pontificate, it and the Lateran Obelisk and several others were sought out and recovered in order to be made into focal points of the city, including the Seven Pilgrim Churches of Rome. It was initially intended to be erected before Santa Croce in Gerusalemme however when the initial plan failed, it was erected in the Piazza del Popolo by Domenico Fontana in 1589 before its present Basilica.

In between 1816 and 1824, the architect Giuseppe Valadier, under Leo XII, renovated the monument by embellishing it with a base having four circular basins and stone lions, imitating the Egyptian style.

== Hieroglyphic Texts on the Obelisk ==
The following is based on Wallis Budge's Translation

Translation
Location	Translation	Source
North Side	Horus Mighty Bull, resting on Truth. Nebti Menthu of the Two Lands, protector of Egypt. Golden Horus Chief, divine, of Khepera. Nesubati Men-maat-Ra, making splendid monuments in Anu, the everlasting seat, which is more firmly founded than the four pillars of the heavens, more stable and flourishing than the fore-court of the House of Ra. The Company of the Gods are satisfied with what hath made the son of Ra, Seti Mer-en-Ptah, [...Cartouche...], beloved of the Souls of Anu, like Ra.	
South Side	Horus Mighty Bull, trampler on all countries in his strength. Nebti Establisher of monuments for ever and for ever. Golden Horus Satisfying Ra with his [works of] love. Nesubati Men-maat-Ra, [...Cartouche...], the august one of Anu, the dweller in [...] pourer of libations to Ra, lord of the [...] The lords of heaven and of earth rejoice and are glad in [showing] him favours, and make double what they do for him. The son of Ra, Seti Mer-en-Ptah, beloved of Her-aakhuti, worketh like Ra for ever.	
South Side Vignette	Seti is seen offering two vases, to the god. The king is described as: Horus, Mighty Bull, life of the Two Lands, lord of the Two Lands, maker of things, lord of valour, Men-maat-Ra, son of Ra, of his body, beloved by him, lord of crowns, Seti Mer-en-Ptah, beloved of Ra the great god, lord of heaven, dweller in the Great House. And Her-aakhuti, the splendour of the Two Lands, the great god, the lord of heaven, says: I have given to thee all lands, and all hills and deserts in peace. I unite for thee on the throne of Horus the South and the North of Egypt like Ra for ever.	
West Side	Bull of Ra, beloved of Maat, fetterer of countries, vanquisher of the Mentiu, beloved of Ra, making great his ka, Men-maat-Ra, who filleth Anu with obelisks, so that their rays may rise upon the House of Ra and flood it with his splendours, and that the gods may assemble in the Great House joyfully. The son of Ra, Seti Mer-en-Ptah, beloved of the Company of the Gods who dwell in the Great House, did [this] that life might be given to him.	
East Side [Central Line]	Mighty Bull, beloved of Maat, User-maat-Ra Setep-en-Ra,[...Cartouche...], son of Ra, Ramessu meri-Amen, [...Cartouche...], made his monuments [as numerous] as the stars of heaven. His works join themselves to the height of heaven, Ra shineth on them and rejoiceth over them in his House of Millions of Years. His Majesty (Rameses II) beautified this monument of his father so that he might make his name to be stablished in the House of Ra.The son of Ra, Ramessu meri-Amen, beloved of Tem, lord of Anu, did this so that life might be given to him for ever.	
East Side [Left Line]	Horus, Mighty Bull, beloved of Maat, strong in years, mighty one of victories, King of the South and the North, User-maat-Ra, Setep-en-Ra, son of Ra, Ramessu meri-Amen, hath made Anu splendid by his great monuments, sculpturing the gods in their forms in the Great House. To the lord of the Two Lands, User-maat-Ra, Setep-en-Ra, son of Ra, Ramessu eri-Amen, may life be given for ever.	
East Side [Right Line]	Horus, Mighty Bull, beloved of Maat, fashioner of the gods, landlord of the Two Lands, King of the South and the North, User-maat-Ra, Setep-en-Ra, son of Ra, Ramessu-meri-Amen. The rays of the two horizons rejoice when they see what hath done the lord of the Two Lands, User-maat-Ra, Setep-en-Ra, the son of Ra, Ramessu-meri-Amen, to whom life hath been given like Ra.	

== Texts on the Pedestal and Fountain below the Obelisk ==
Text of Augustus' Dedication
Text	Expansion	Translation	Source
IMP·CAESAR·DIVI·F; AVGVSTVS; PONTIFEX MAXIMVS; IMP·XII·COS·XI·TRIB·POT·XIV; AEGYPTO·IN·POTESTATEM; POPULI·ROMANI·REDACTA; SOLI·DONUM·DEDIT	Imperator Caesar, Divi filius, Augustus, Pontifex Maximus, Imperator XII, Consul XI, Tribunicia Potestate XIV, Aegypto in potestatem Populi Romani redacta, Soli donum dedit.	Imperator Caesar Augustus, son of the divine Julius Caesar Pontifex maximus, acclaimed Imperator twelve times, Consul eleven times, holding Tribunician power for the fourteenth time, after Egypt had been brought under the power of the Roman people, gave this [obelisk] as a gift to the Sun.	

Text of Sixtus' Rededication of the Obelisk
Text	Expansion	Translation	Source
SIXTVS V. PONT. MAX. OBELISCVM HVNC; A CAESARE AVG. SOLI; IN CIRCO MAXIMO RITV; DICATVUM IMPIO; MISERANDA RVINA; FRACTVM OBRVTVMQ. CRVICQ. INVICTISS. DEDICARI IVSSIT; AN. M.D.LXXXIX. PONT. IIII.	Sixtus Quintus Pontifex Maximus obeliscum hunc a Caesare Augusto Soli in Circo Maximo ritu dicatum impio, miseranda ruina fractum obrutumque, Crucique Invictissimae dedicari iussit anno MDLXXXIX, pontificatus quarto.	Sixtus the Fifth, Supreme Pontiff, ordered this obelisk—which had been dedicated by Caesar Augustus to the Sun in the Circus Maximus with an impious rite, and [which had been] broken and buried by a wretched collapse—to be dedicated to the most invincible Cross, in the year 1589, the fourth year of his pontificate.	
ANTE SACRAM; ILLVS AEDAM; AVGVSTIOR; LAETIORQ. SVRGO; CVIVS EX VTERO; VIRGINALI; AVG. IMPERANTE; SOL IVSTITIAE; EXHORTVS EST.	Ante sacram illius aedem Augustior laetiorque surgo, cuius ex utero virginali, Augusto imperante, Sol Iustitiae exortus est.	Before the sacred temple of that [Virgin], more August (than Augustus) and happier I rise; from whose virginal womb, while Augustus was ruling, the Sun of Justice dawned. alternate I rise more august and happy, in front of the holy temple of She out of whose maiden womb, during the reign of Augustus, the Sun of Justice was born.	

== See also ==
- Elephant and Obelisk – Ancient Egyptian obelisk on a marble elephant, a landmark of Rome, Italy
- List of obelisks in Rome
- List of Egyptian obelisks

== Bibliography ==
- Brand, Peter J. (1997). "The 'Lost' Obelisks and Colossi of Seti I". Journal of the American Research Center in Egypt. 34: 101–114. doi:10.2307/40000801. JSTOR 40000801.
- Brand, Peter (2000). The Monuments of Seti I: Epigraphic, Historical, and Art Historical Analysis. Leiden. ISBN 978-9004117709.
- Curran, Brian A.; Grafton, Anthony; Long, Pamela O.; Weiss, Benjamin (2009). Obelisk: A History. Cambridge, Massachusetts: MIT Press. ISBN 978-0-262-51270-1.
- D'Onofrio, Cesare (1967). Gli obelischi di Roma. Rome: Bulzoni.
- Iversen, Erik (1968). Obelisks in Exile, Vol. 1: The Obelisks of Rome. Copenhagen: G.E.C. Gad.
- Budge, E. A. Wallis (1926). Cleopatra's Needles and Other Egyptian Obelisks. London: The Religious Tract Society.
- Parker, John Henry (1876). The Archaeology of Rome: Part IV. The Egyptian Obelisks. London: James Parker and Co.
- Batta, Ernst (1968). Obelisken: Ägyptische Obelisken und ihre Geschichte in Rom. Frankfurt.
- L'Italia. Roma (guida rossa), Touring Club Italiano, Milano 2004
- Armin Wirsching, Obelisken transportieren und aufrichten in Aegypten und in Rom, Norderstedt 2007 (2nd ed. 2010), ISBN 978-3-8334-8513-8

Preceded by Lateran Obelisk	Landmarks of Rome; Flaminio Obelisk	Succeeded by Elephant and Obelisk
