= Edmund Buchner =

German ancient historian

Edmund Buchner (22 October 1923, Ittling near Straubing – 27 August 2011) was a German ancient historian and former President of the German Archaeological Institute (Deutschen Archäologischen Instituts, or DAI).

He graduated in 1953 from the University of Erlangen, with a thesis on the Panegyrikos of Isocrates and then became assistant to the newly appointed to Erlangen Helmut Berve. As Berve was Director of the Commission for Ancient History and Epigraphy (Kommission für Alte Geschichte und Epigraphik, or AEK) in Munich from 1960, Buchner followed him as a research assistant From 1969 until 1979, Buchner was a professor and director of the AEK, which belonged to what is now the DAI, and from 1980 to 1988 the DAI's president.

Buchner is known primarily for his research on the solarium Augusti, the sundial erected by the Roman emperor Augustus on the Field of Mars in Rome.

== Works ==
- Der Panegyrikos des Isokrates. Eine historisch-philologische Untersuchung. Steiner, Wiesbaden 1958.
- Die Sonnenuhr des Augustus. Zabern, Mainz 1982, ISBN 3-8053-0430-7.
- Neues zur Sonnenuhr des Augustus. In: Nürnberger Blätter zur Archäologie, Heft 10 (1993/94), S. 77–84.
- Ein Kanal für Obelisken. Neues vom Mausoleum des Augustus in Rom. In: Antike Welt 27 (1996), H. 3, S. 161–168.
