= Giovanni Antinori =

Italian architect (1734–1792)

Giovanni Antinori (January 28, 1734 – June 24, 1792) was an Italian neoclassical architect. Employed by the papacy, he oversaw the re-erecting of three of Rome's obelisks - the Quirinale (between the Horse Tamers), the Sallustian (outside Trinità dei Monti) and the Montecitorio.

== Life ==
He studied mathematics in his birth town, Camerino, under his father Girolamo, a well-known and expert surveyor. He left Camerino for Rome to continue his mathematical studies (and started his architectural studies) at the "Sapienza" and at the Accademia di San Luca, participating in the 1754 Concorso Clementino in "classe II di Architettura". He was instructed in architecture by Marquis Gerolamo Theodoli, designer of the teatro Argentina. In 1755 Antinori went to Lisbon where he worked as architect in the Casa dos Bicos attending the reconstruction works after the earthquake of 1755. He also worked to the plans of a new palazzo reale of Campolide for Joseph I, but a short time later was imprisoned either due to envious accusations by his rivals or due to a conspiracy in which he had got involved. With the help of the Portuguese woman Josefa Luisa Lopez de Cunha, he escaped and fled to Italy, where he married her.

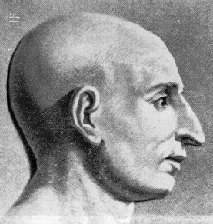
Giovanni Antinori

Returning to Rome and from there to Camerino, he built the splendid arcade and Hall of Mirrors in the castle-villa of Marquis Alessandro Bandini (Lanciano di Castelraimondo). From 1772 to 1778 he reconstructed and enlarged the interior of the church of the Monte Oliveto Maggiore abbey not far from Siena, creating grandiose Baroque shapes which anticipated the neoclassical forms to come. He worked for the Doria-Pamphilj family in Rome, collaborating with Francesco Nicoletti, their court architect, and replacing him from 1776 onwards. He built them the structures sustaining temporary wooden hall in the courtyard of their palazzo in Via del Corso in 1769 in occasion of the visit of emperor Joseph II of Austria. He also worked on designing the new waterfalls in the gardens of the Villa Doria Pamphili which were subsequently amended by architect Francesco Bettini, and worked at their other properties on the outskirts of Rome, designing alongside his brothers Luigi, Tommaso and Vincenzo and nephew Girolamo. From 1778 to 1783 he constructed a casale within their castello at Piombinara, not far from Colleferro.

On the accession of Pope Pius VI, Antinori was put in charge of an important excavation in the church of San Rocco, near the Mausoleum of Augustus, which revealed a large red obelisk of granite. He also worked on the Piazza del Quirinale, rotating the Horse Tamers statues (originally parallel to each other) and placing the obelisk from S. Rocco between them using powerful winches and mechanisms. In 1787–89 he raised the Sallustian and in 1790–1792 that at the Piazza Montecitorio (which is still, in his honour, inscribed 'IOAN. ANTINORIO CAMERTE ARCHIT.’. ANTINORIO CAMERTE ARCHIT). In 1790–91 Antinori drew a proposal for the Palazzo Braschi for Luigi Braschi Onesti, nephew of Pius VI - other projects was presented by Giuseppe Barberi, Melchiorre Passalacqua, Giuseppe Valadier and Cosimo Morelli, who obtained the commission.

Giovanni Antinori died in Rome, whilst still directing the works at Piazza Montecitorio, which were completed by his assistant Pasquale Belli (1752–1833). He was buried in the Church of S. Venanzio dei Camerti. In 1929 that church was demolished to make way for gardens and public spaces around the Vittorio Emmanuele Monument and, despite requests from the local government of Camerino, it proved impossible to find and save Antinori's mortal remains before demolition. His wife was buried in the church of S. Antonio dei Portoghesi, always in Rome.

== Sources ==
- A. Ricci, Memorie storiche delle Arti e degli Artisti della Marca di Ancona, II, Macerata 1834.
- L. Mariani, "Joannes Antinori, Camers", in L’Appennino XVIII, 24, 20 giugno 1893.
- P. Savini, "Antinori Giovanni", in: Storia della città di Camerino, p. 240, Camerino 1895.
- L. Bianchi, "Disegni di Ferdinando Fuga e di altri architetti del Settecento", exhibition catalogue, Rome 1955, pp. 95–97.
- P. Barocchi, "Antinori Giovanni" in: Dizionario Biografico degli Italiani, volume III, Rome 1961.
- E. Kieven, "Antinori Giovanni" in: McMillan’s Encyclopedia of Architects, I, pp. 87–88.
- C. D'Onofrio, Gli obelischi di Roma, Rome, 1965, pp. 256–91.
- A.M. Corbo, "L’attività romana e il testamento di Giovanni Antinori architetto di Pio VI", in L’arte 17, 1972, pp. 133–146.
- P. Marconi - A. Cipriani - E. Valeriani, I disegni di architettura dell’Archivio storico dell’Accademia di San Luca, volume 1, Rome 1974, diss. 515–518.
- G. Caradante, Il palazzo Doria Pamphili, Milan, 1975.
- S. Carbonara Pompei, "Giovanni Antinori in Architetti e Ingegneri a confronto", in L'immagine di Roma tra Clemente XIII e Pio VII, ed. E. Debenedetti, Studi sul Settecento romano, 22 (2006), pp. 105–111.
- L.M. Cristini, "Il «Progetto Antinori»: la riscoperta di un artefice dello spazio urbano tardobarocco tra Roma e Lisbona" in: “Recondita armonia. Il Paesaggio tra progetto e governo del territorio”, atti del III Convegno internazionale Beni Culturali - Urbino, 5-6-7 ottobre 2006, Urbino 2007.
- Universita degli Studi di Camerino
- Giovanni Antinori, personaggi di Roma (in Italian)
- Giovanni Antinori, www.itcgantinori.sinp.net (in Italian)
- Giovanni Antinori, www.architettimacerata.it (in Italian)
