= Lateran Obelisk =

Ancient Egyptian obelisk, now a landmark of Rome, Italy

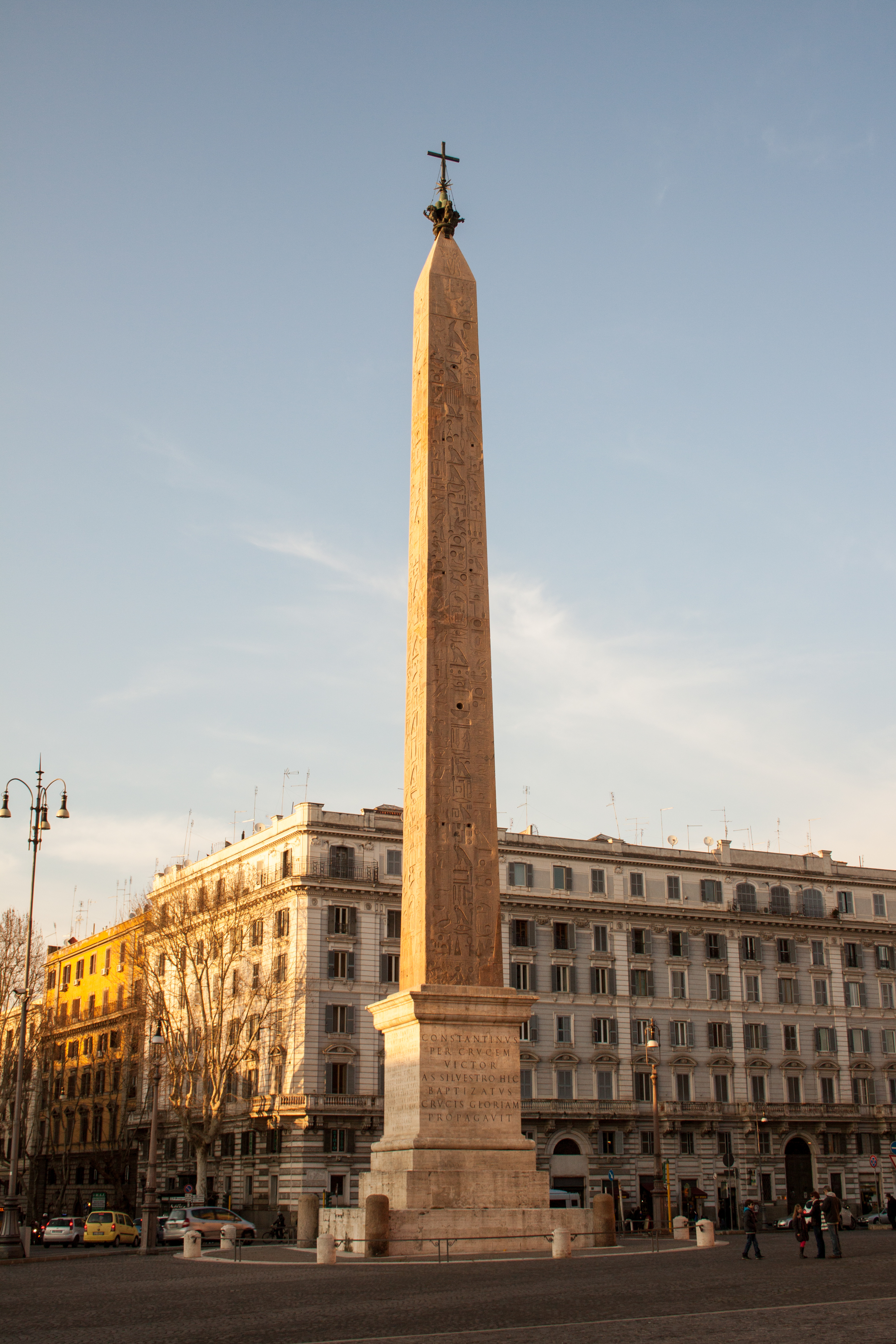
- The obelisk in 2013
- Click on the map for a fullscreen view
- Location: Rome, Lazio, Italy
- Coordinates: 41°53′12.6″N 12°30′17.2″E
- Designer: Thutmose III and Thutmose IV
- Type: Obelisk
- Material: Granite
- Height: 45.7 metres (150 ft)
- Completion date: c. 1400 BC

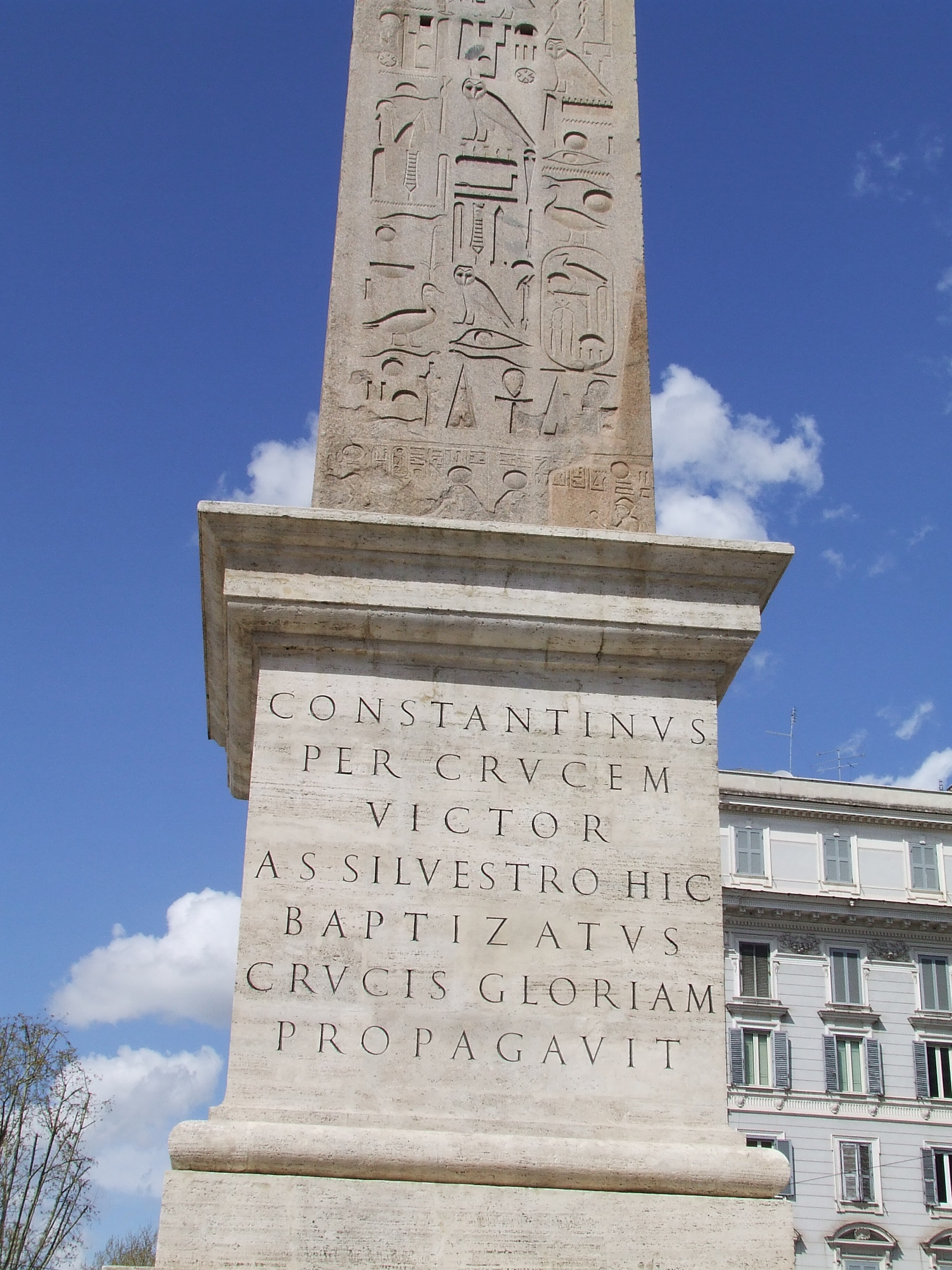
The base of the obelisk was erected in 1588 and incorrectly claims that it marks the location of Emperor Constantine I's baptism, although he was actually baptized in Nicomedia

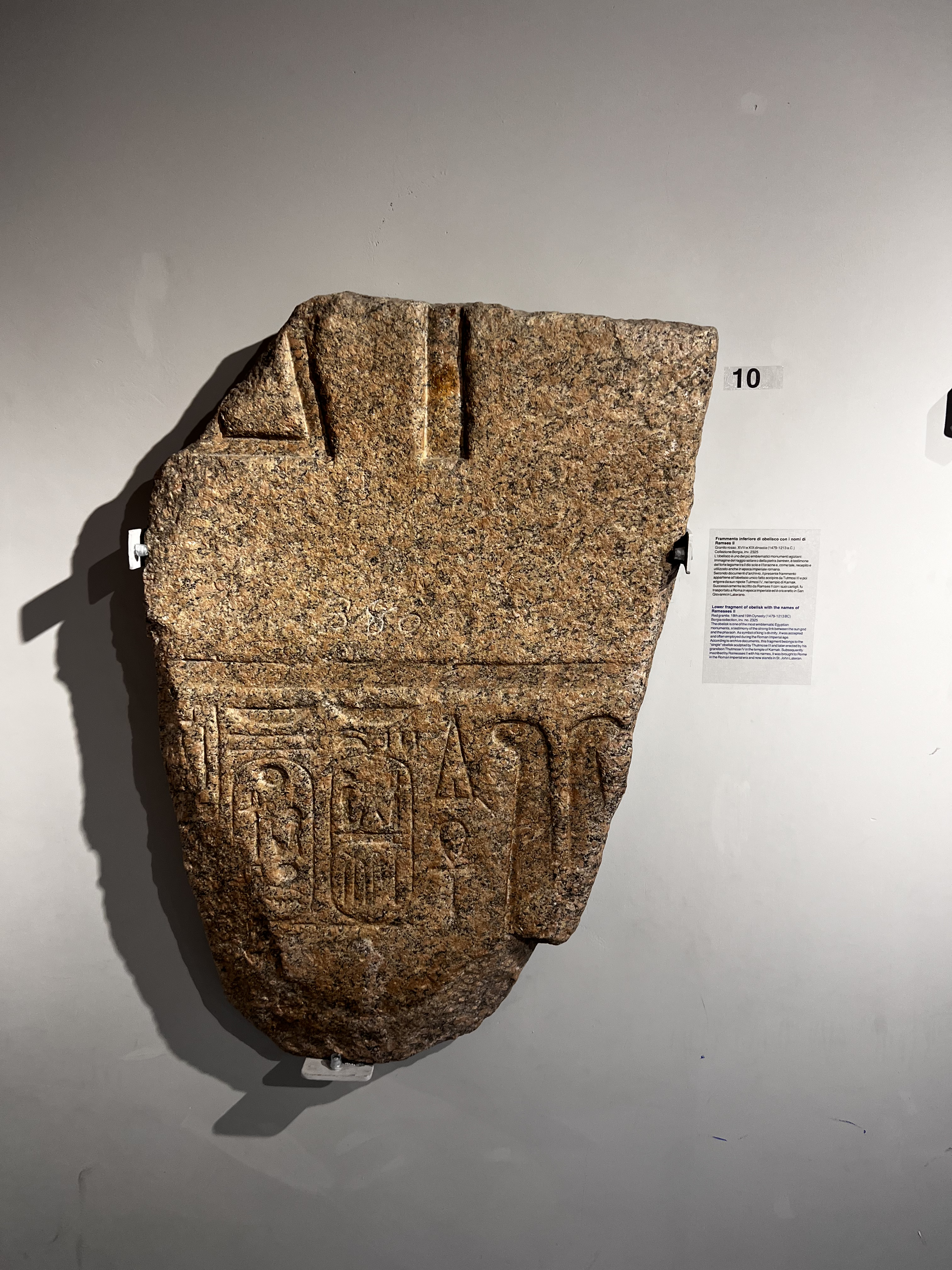
Part of the original obelisk at the Naples Archaeological Museum

The Lateran Obelisk (Italian: Obelisco Lateranense; Latin: Obeliscus Constantii) is the largest standing ancient Egyptian obelisk in the world, and it is also the tallest obelisk in Italy. It originally weighed 413 tonnes (455 short tons), but after collapsing and being re-erected 4 metres (13 ft) shorter, now weighs around 300 tonnes (330 short tons). It is located in Rome, in the square across from the Archbasilica of Saint John Lateran and the San Giovanni Addolorata Hospital.

The obelisk was made around 1400 BC in Karnak, Egypt, during the reigns of Pharaohs Thutmose III and Thutmose IV. Roman Emperor Constantine I had it moved to Alexandria in the early 4th century, then Constantius II in 357 had it shipped to Rome and erected at the Circus Maximus. The obelisk collapsed and broke into pieces sometime after the Circus's abandonment in the 5th century and became buried. It was excavated and restored by Domenico Fontana in the late 1580s, and by the order of Pope Sixtus V was topped with a Christian cross and installed in its present location near the Lateran Palace.

== History ==
Originally, the obelisk was created by Pharaoh Thutmose III for himself and another for his father, but neither were completed before his death. Thutmose III's grandson, Thutmose IV finished the obelisks and had them erected to the east of the great temple of Amun in Karnak.^{map}

Now His Majesty completed the very great sole obelisk from what his ancestor the King of Upper and Lower Egypt Menkheperre (Thutmose III) brought after His Majesty found this obelisk having lain for a total of 35 years on its side in the possession of the craftsmen on the south side of Karnak.

— Inscription of Thutmose IV on the Lateran obelisk

When it was completed, the obelisk now known as the Lateran Obelisk stood at 32 m (105 ft) which was the tallest one in Egypt. Both it and the other obelisk, known as the Obelisk of Theodosius, were brought to Alexandria over the Nile River by an obelisk ship in the early 4th century by Constantius II. He intended to bring both obelisks to Constantinople, the new capital for the Roman Empire; the Lateran Obelisk never made it.

=== Circus Maximus ===
After the obelisk remained in Alexandria for a few decades, Constantius II had the Lateran obelisk shipped to Rome when he made his only visit there in 357. It was erected near the Egyptian obelisk called the Flaminio, which had stood since 10 BC where it was installed by Augustus to decorate the spina of the Circus Maximus.^{map} There they both remained, until after the fall of the Western Roman Empire in the 5th century the Circus Maximus was abandoned and they eventually broke or were taken down. They were eventually buried by mud and detritus carried by a small stream over time.

First person accounts have the original (Roman) base of the monument still in the Circus Maximus as late as 1589. It contained a narrative of Constantius' transport, raising, and dedication of "his father's" obelisk inscribed on its four sides as a long epigram.

=== Piazza San Giovanni in Laterano ===
Though pieces of the obelisk were found in the 14th and 15th centuries, serious excavation was only made possible under Pope Sixtus V. The three pieces of the Lateran obelisk were dug up in 1587, and after being restored by architect Domenico Fontana, the obelisk was re-erected approximately 4 metres (13 ft) shorter. When it was erected near the Lateran Palace and basilica of St. John Lateran on 3 August 1588 and became consecrated on 9 August, it became the last ancient Egyptian obelisk to be erected in Rome. Its location was formerly the spot where the equestrian statue of Marcus Aurelius stood until 1538, when it was relocated to decorate the Piazza del Campidoglio on Capitoline Hill.

The obelisk was topped with a cross and the pedestal was decorated with inscriptions explaining its Egyptian history and its travels to Alexandria and Rome, mentioning the baptism of Constantine I.

== Former locations ==
- Lateran at Karnak, Egypt: 25°43′7.46″N 32°39′26.64″E
- Lateran at Circus Maximus in Rome: 41°53′6.31″N 12°29′14.45″E

== See also ==
- Flaminio Obelisk – Ancient Egyptian monument in Rome, Italy
- Arch of Constantine – 4th-century triumphal arch in Rome, Italy
- List of obelisks in Rome
- List of Egyptian obelisks

== Bibliography ==
- Richardson, Lawrence (1992). A New Topographical Dictionary of Ancient Rome. p. 273. ISBN 0801843006.
- Gorringe, Henry H. (1882). Egyptian obelisks. pp. 127–129. doi:10.11588/diglit.33567#0239.
- Ammianus Marcellinus. "4 By order of Constantius Augustus an obelisk is set up at Rome in the Circus Maximus; also an account of obelisks and hieroglyphics.". Roman Antiquities. Vol. 17.

Preceded by Porta Esquilina	Landmarks of Rome; Lateran Obelisk	Succeeded by Flaminio Obelisk
