= Palazzo Montecitorio =

Palace in Rome, Italy

- Chamber of Deputies of the Italian Republic
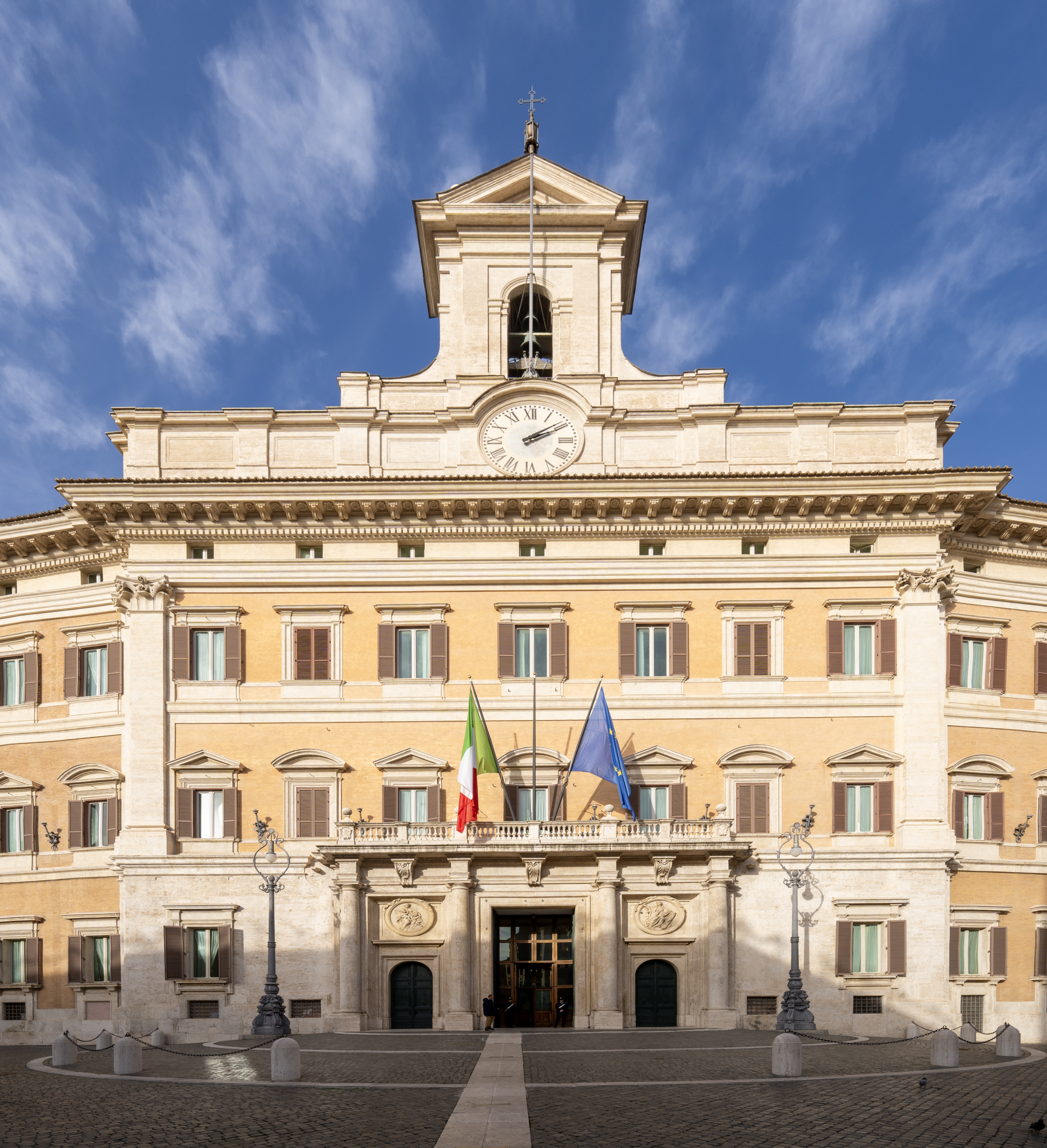
- Palazzo Montecitorio, seat of the Italian Chamber of Deputies
- Interactive map of the Palazzo Montecitorio area

General information
- Location: Rome, Italy
- Coordinates: 41.9014°N 12.4786°E
- Client: Cardinal Ludovico Ludovisi

Design and construction
- Architects: Gian Lorenzo Bernini; Carlo Fontana; Ernesto Basile

Palazzo Montecitorio (pronounced [paˈlattso ˌmontetʃiˈtɔːrjo]) is a palace in Rome and the seat of the Chamber of Deputies, the lower house of the Italian Parliament.

== History ==
The palace's name derives from the slight hill on which it is built, which was claimed to be the Mons Citatorius, the hill created in the process of clearing the Campus Martius in Roman times.

The building was originally designed by Gian Lorenzo Bernini for the young Cardinal Ludovico Ludovisi, nephew of Pope Gregory XV. However, with the death of Gregory XV by 1623, work stopped, and was not restarted until the papacy of Pope Innocent XII (Antonio Pignatelli), when it was completed by the architect Carlo Fontana, who modified Bernini's plan with the addition of a bell gable above the main entrance. The building was designated for public and social functions only, due to Innocent XII's firm anti-nepotism policies which were in contrast to his predecessors'.

In 1696 the Curia apostolica (papal law courts) was installed there. Later it was home to the Governatorato di Roma (the city administration during the papal period) and the police headquarters. The excavated obelisk of the Solarium Augusti, now known as the Obelisk of Montecitorio, was installed in front of the palace by Pius VI in 1789.

With the Unification of Italy in 1861 and the transfer of the capital to Rome in 1870, Montecitorio was seized by the Italian government and chosen as the seat of the Chamber of Deputies, after consideration of various possibilities. The former internal courtyard was roofed over and converted into a semi-circular assembly room by Paolo Comotto. The Chamber was inaugurated on 21 November 1871.

But the building proved wholly inadequate: the acoustics were terrible, it was very cold in winter and very hot in summer. As a result of extensive damage from water seepage, the palace was condemned in 1900. An attempt to build a new palace for the Chamber of Deputies on the Via Nazionale failed, and a provisional meeting hall was built on the Via della Missione. Only in 1918 was the Chamber definitively returned to the Palazzo Montecitorio.

The return of the Chamber of Deputies to the palace followed extensive renovations, which left only the facade intact. The architect, Ernesto Basile, was an exponent of Art Nouveau, known in Italy as Liberty style. He reduced the courtyard, demolished the wings and rear of the palace, constructing a new structure dominated by four red-brick and travertine towers at the corners. Basile also added the so-called Transatlantico, the long and impressive salon which surrounds the debating chamber and now acts as the informal centre of Italian politics.

The debating chamber is characterized by numerous decorations in the Art Nouveau style: the impressive canopy of coloured glass (the work of Giovanni Beltrami), the pictorial frieze entitled The Italian People (by Giulio Aristide Sartorio) which surrounds the chamber, the bronze figures flanking the presidential and government benches, and the panels depicting The Glory of the Savoy Dynasty by Davide Calandra.

== See also ==
- Palazzo del Quirinale
- Palazzo Madama
- Palazzo Chigi
- Palazzo della Consulta
- Palazzo di Giustizia

== Gallery ==
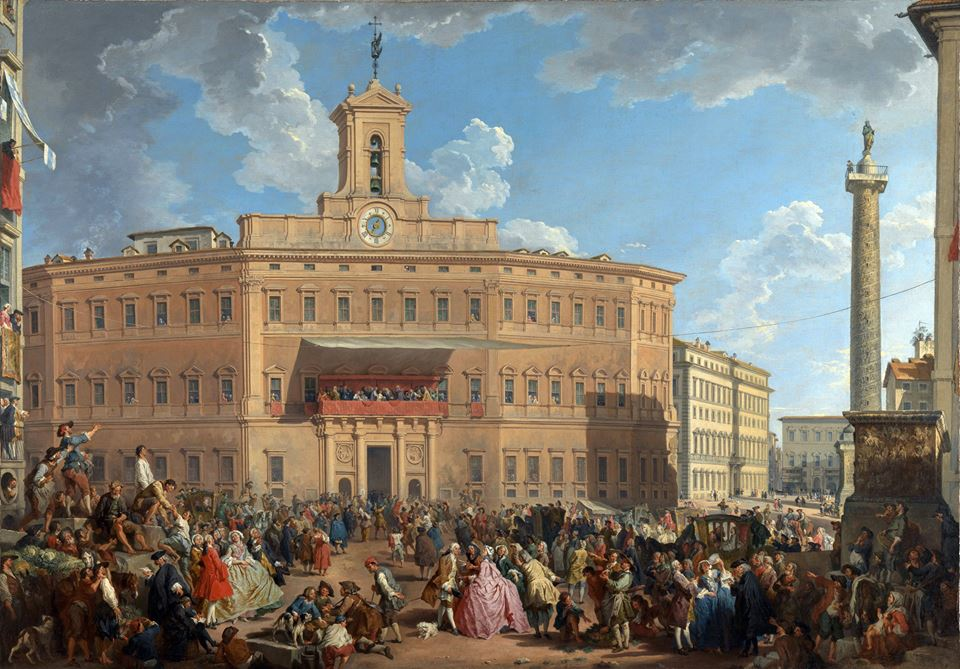
The Lottery in Piazza di Montecitorio by Giovanni Paolo Pannini, c. 1744

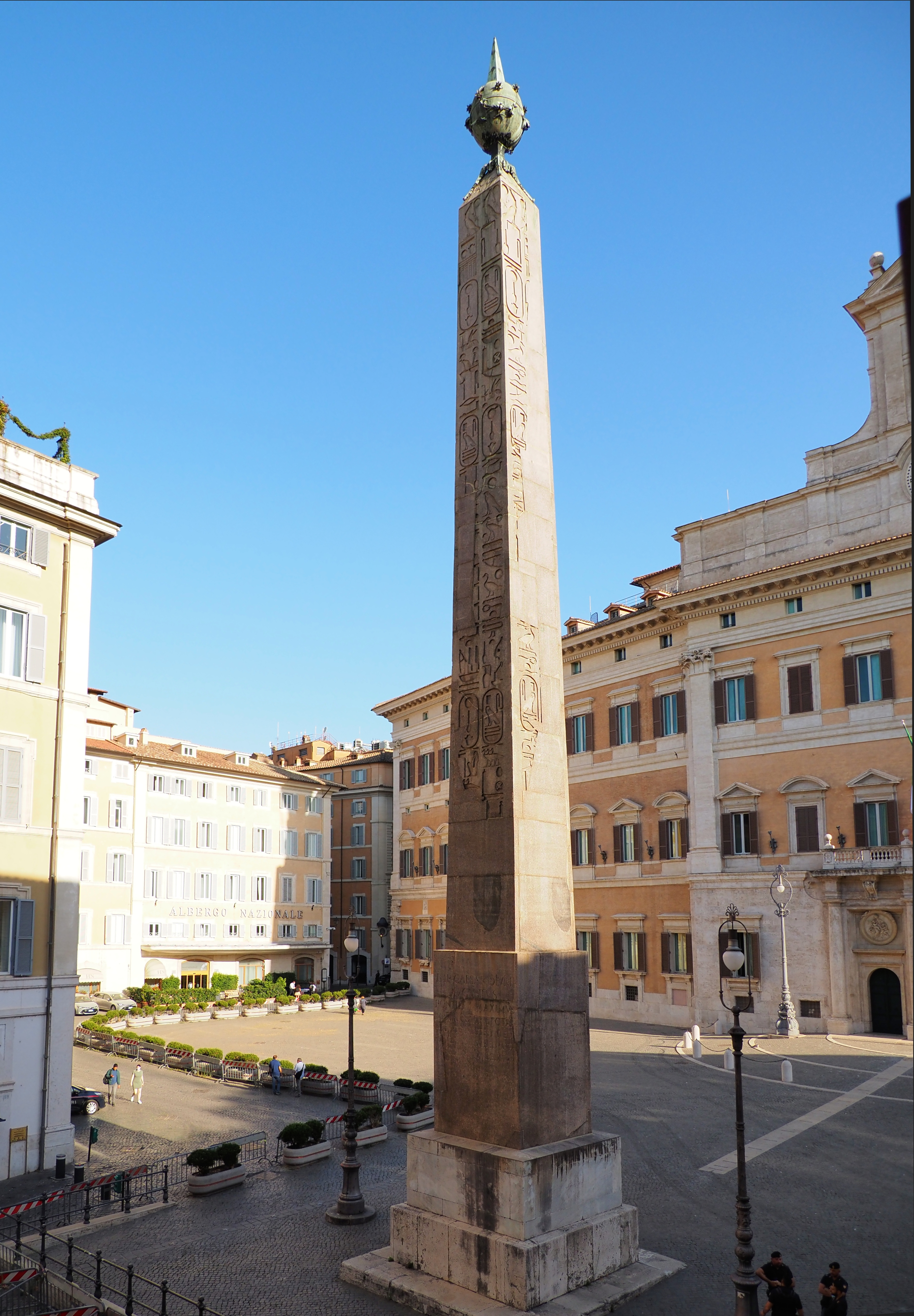
Square with the obelisk

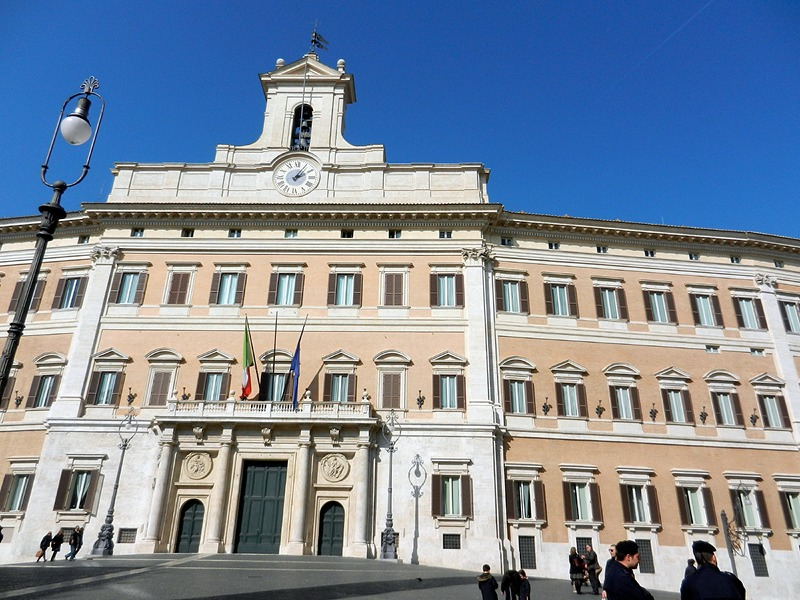
Front facade

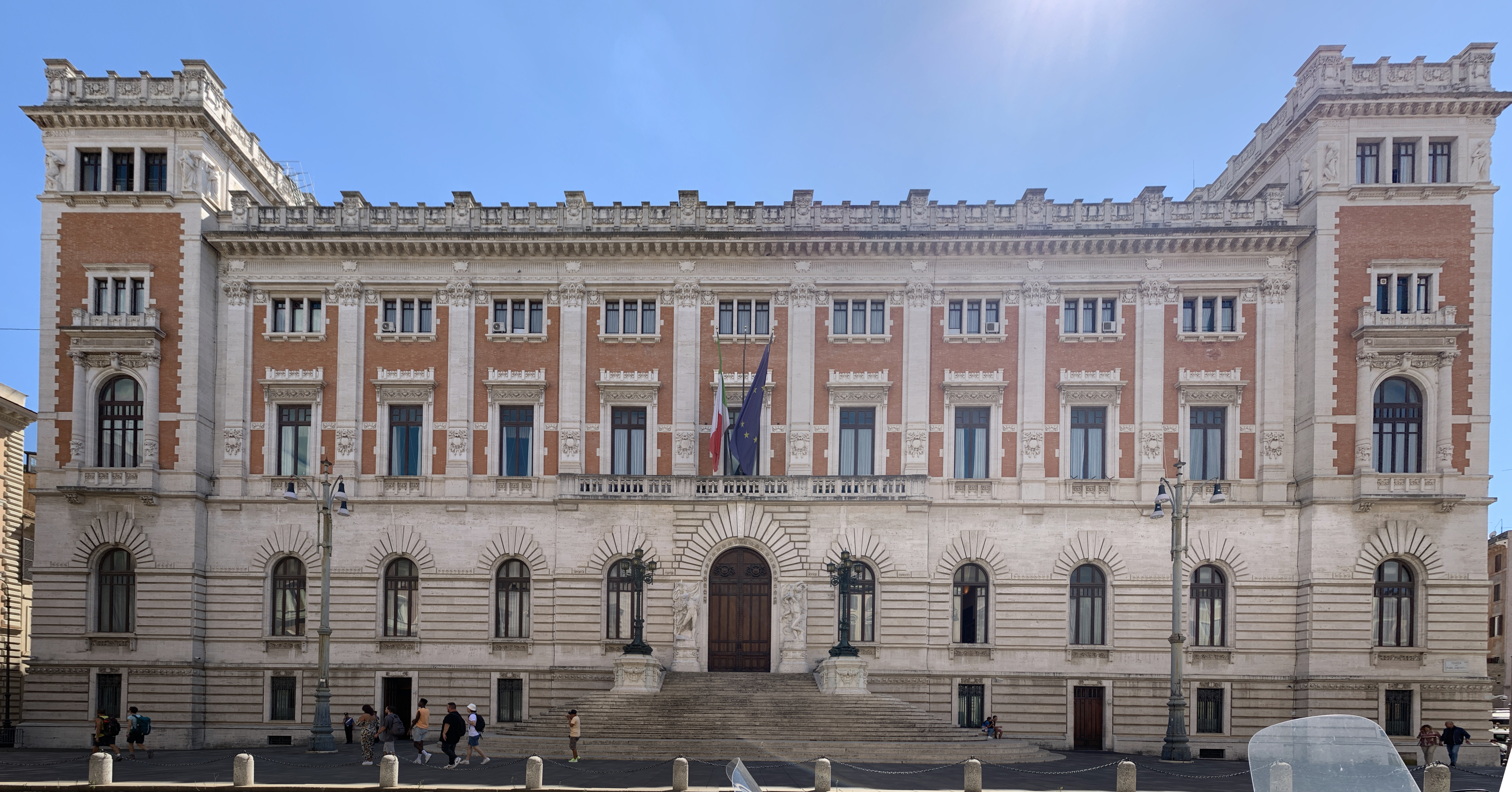
Rear facade

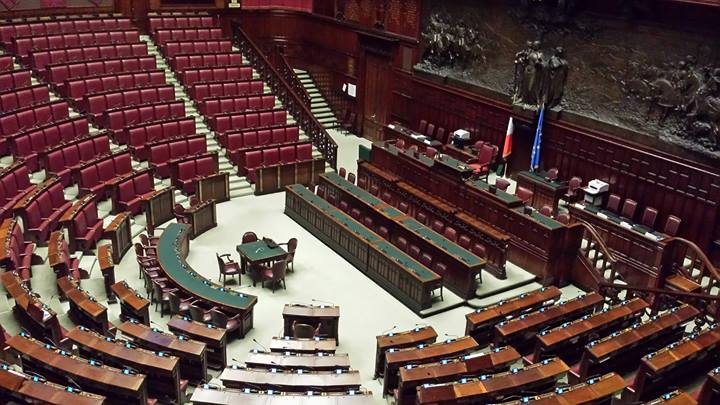
Debating chamber, designed by Ernesto Basile

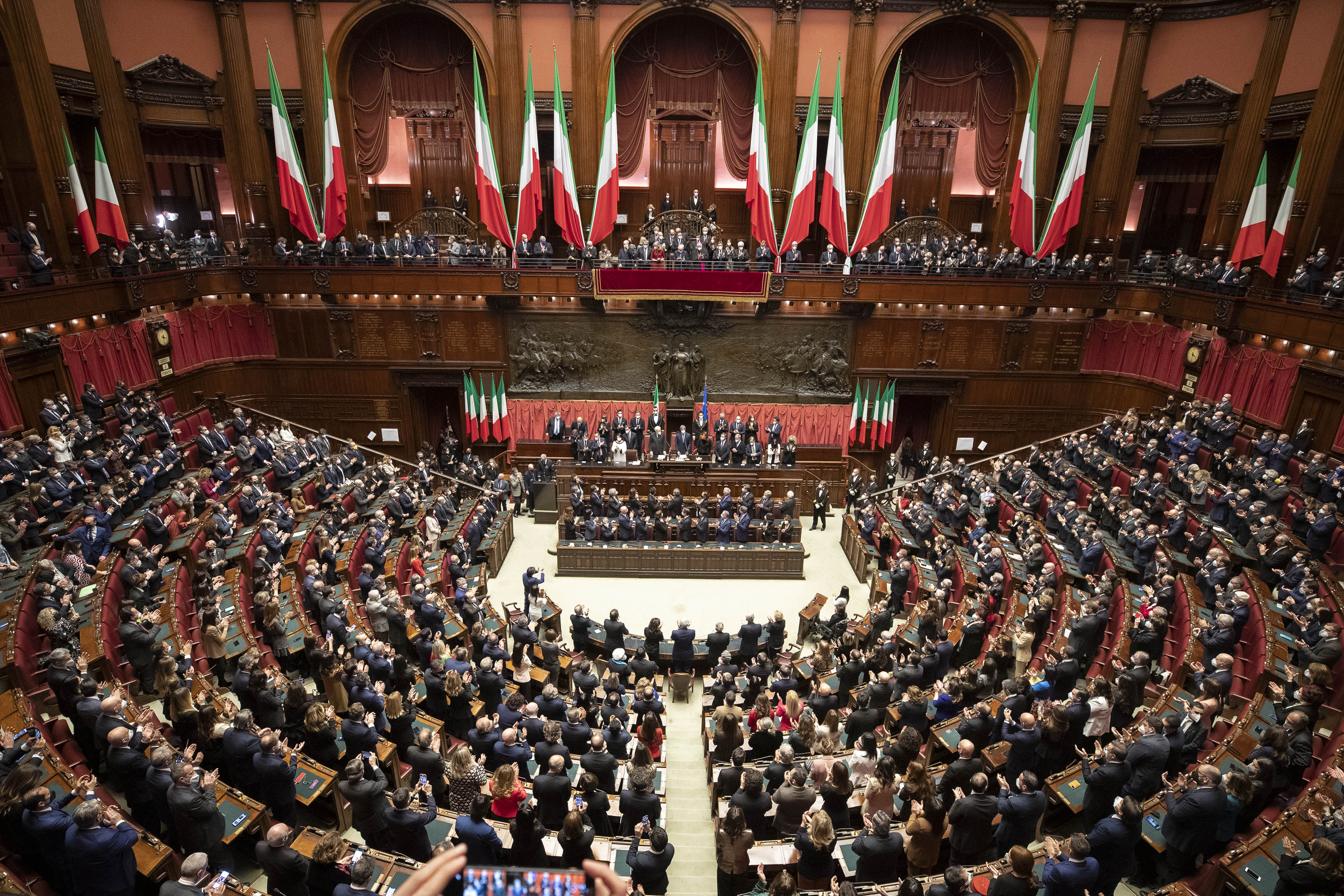
Presidential inauguration of Sergio Mattarella (2022)
