= Piazza di Monte Citorio =

Piazza in Rome

- City square
- {{{other_names}}}
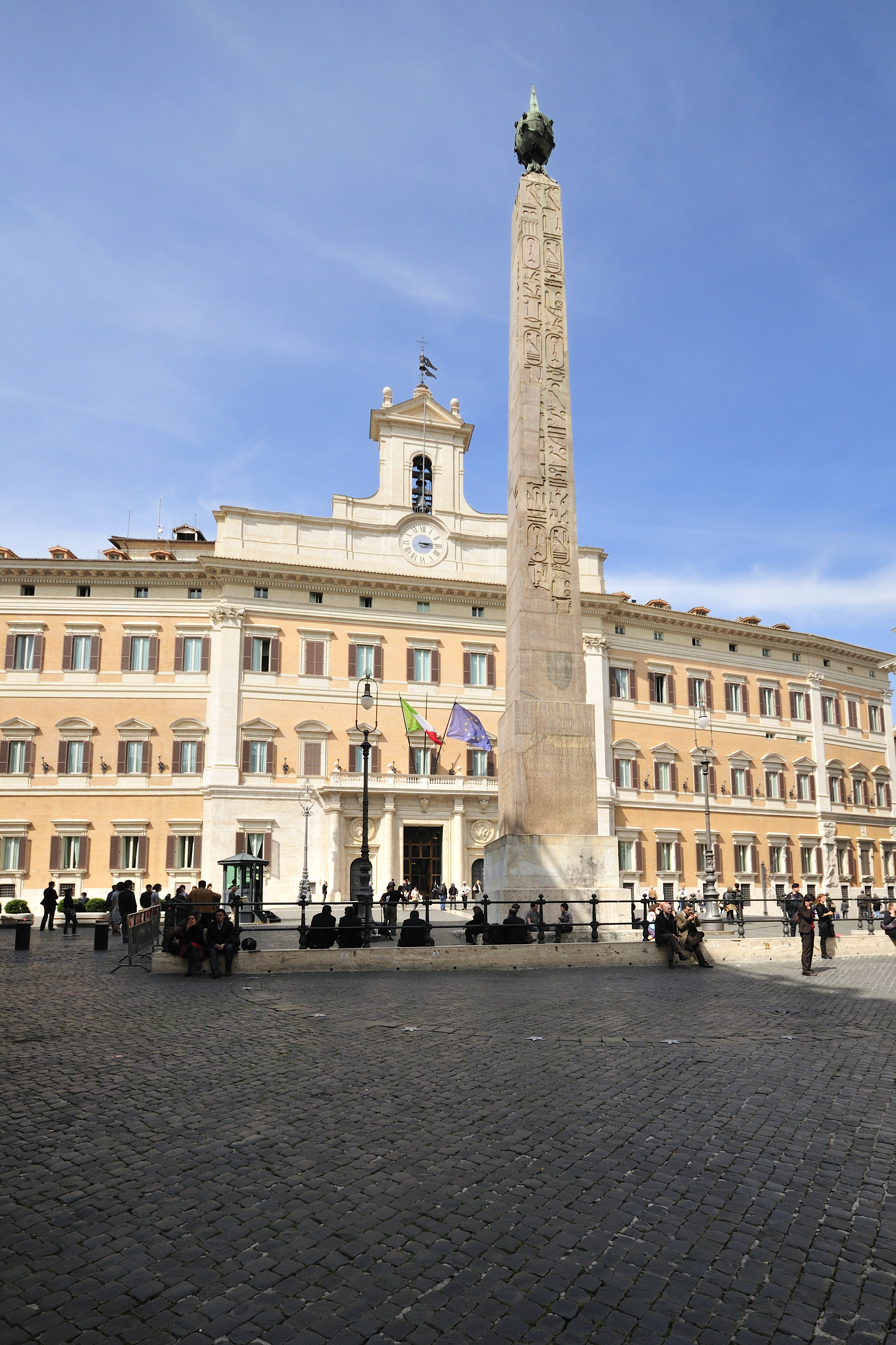
- Photograph of the Piazza (2010)
- Location: Rome, Italy
- Interactive map of Piazza di Monte Citorio
- Coordinates: 41°54′03″N 12°28′43″E

Piazza di Monte Citorio or Piazza Montecitorio is a piazza in Rome. It is named after the Monte Citorio, one of the minor hills of Rome.

The piazza contains the Obelisk of Montecitorio and the Palazzo Montecitorio. The base of the column of Antoninus Pius was also once sited here.

== History ==
Originally laid out in Imperial Rome, the piazza has been reconstructed over the centuries, in particular 1789 to 1792 and 1988.

In 1964, when the obelisk collapsed, the piazza was closed.

== Gallery ==
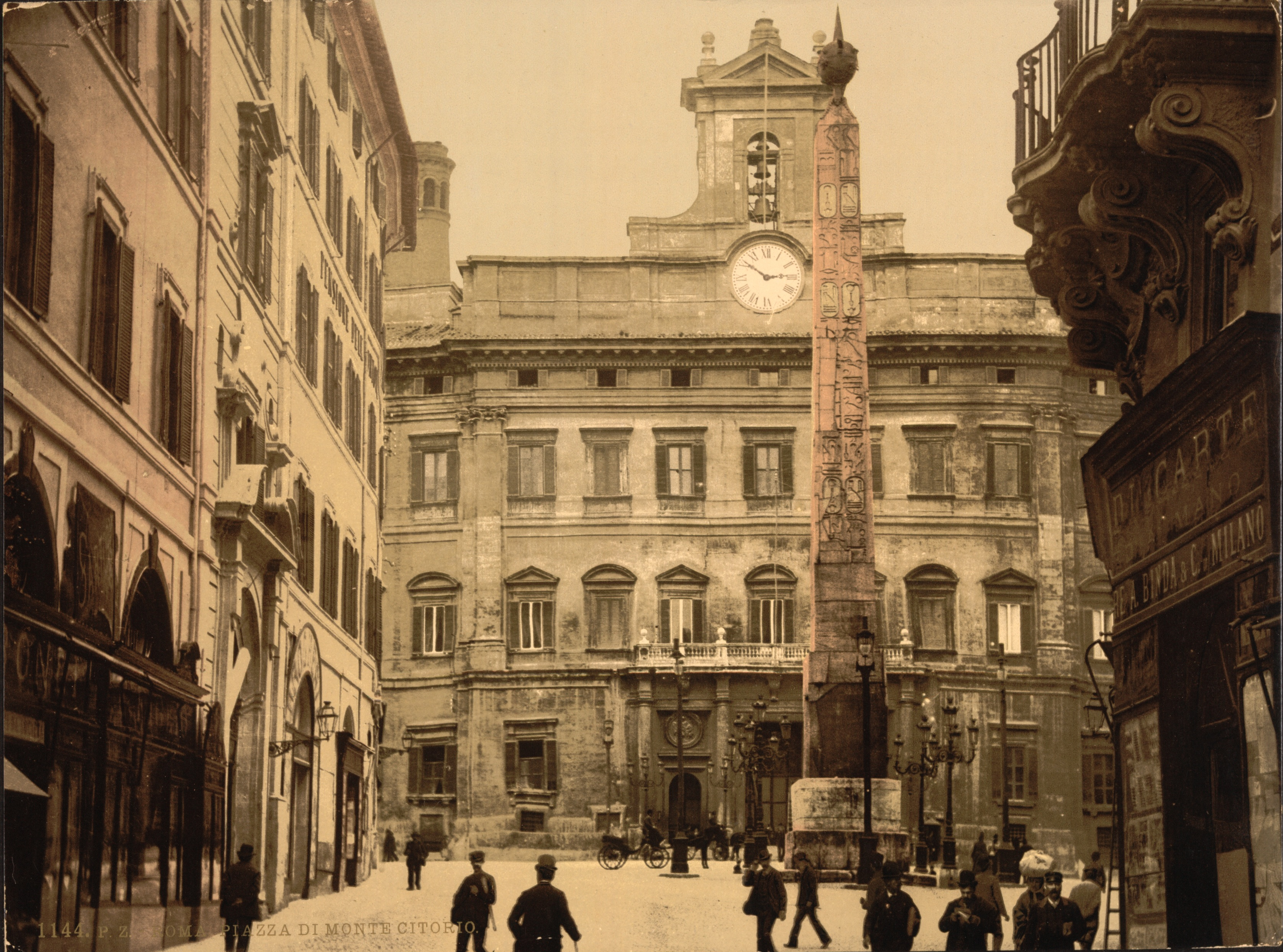
Photochrom image (1890s)

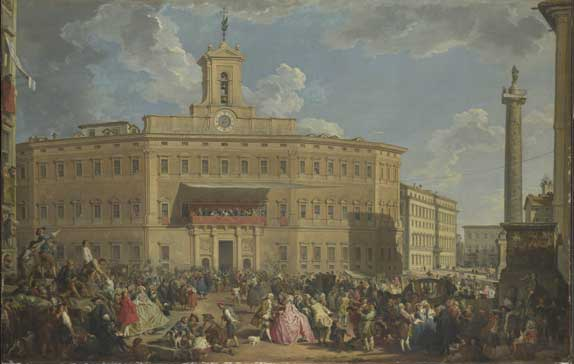
The Piazza di Monte Citorio, painting by Panini (1747)
