= Via Giulia =

Thoroughfare in Rome, Italy

Coordinates: 41.8942°N 12.4701°E

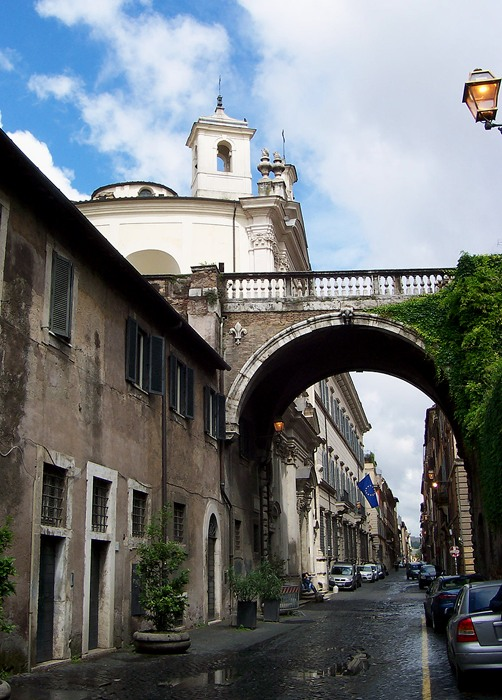
- Arco Farnese across Via Giulia
- Interactive map of Via Giulia
- Former name: Via Magistralis; Via Recta
- Namesake: Pope Julius II
- Length: 950 m (3,120 ft)
- Location: Rome, Italy
- Quarter: Regola, Ponte
- South end: Piazza San Vincenzo Pallotti
- North end: Piazza dell'Oro

Construction
- Completion: 1512

Other
- Designer: Donato Bramante

The Via Giulia is a street of historical and architectural importance in Rome, Italy, which runs along the left (east) bank of the Tiber from Piazza San Vincenzo Pallotti, near Ponte Sisto, to Piazza dell'Oro. It is about 1 kilometre long and connects the Regola and Ponte Rioni.

The road's design was commissioned in 1508 to Donato Bramante by Pope Julius II (r. 1503–1513), of the powerful della Rovere family, and was one of the first important urban planning projects in papal Rome during the Renaissance.

The road, named after its patron, had been also called Via Magistralis (lit. 'master road') because of its importance, and Via Recta (lit. 'straight road') because of its layout.

The project had three aims: the creation of a major roadway inserted in a new system of streets superimposed on the maze of alleys of medieval Rome; the construction of a large avenue surrounded by sumptuous buildings to testify to the renewed grandeur of the Catholic Church; and finally, the foundation of a new administrative and banking centre near the Vatican, the seat of the popes, and far from the traditional city centre on the Capitoline Hill, dominated by the Roman baronial families opposed to the pontiffs.

Despite the interruption of the project due to the pax romana of 1511 and the death of the pope two years later, the new road immediately became one of the main centres of the Renaissance in Rome. Many palaces and churches were built by the most important architects of the time, such as Raffaello Sanzio and Antonio da Sangallo the Younger, who often chose to move into the street. Several noble families joined them, while European nations and Italian city-states chose to build their churches in the street or in the immediate vicinity.

In the Baroque period the building activity, directed by the most important architects of the time such as Francesco Borromini, Carlo Maderno and Giacomo della Porta, continued unabated, while the street, favorite location of the Roman nobles, became the theatre of tournaments, parties and carnival parades. During this period the popes and private patrons continued to take care of the road by founding charitable institutions and providing the area with drinking water.

From the middle of the 18th century, the shift of the city centre towards the Campo Marzio plain caused the cessation of building activity and the abandonment of the road by the nobles. An artisan population with its workshops replaced these, and Via Giulia took on the solitary and solemn aspect that would have characterized it for two centuries. During the Fascist period some construction projects broke the unity of the road in its central section, and the damage has not yet been repaired. Despite this, Via Giulia remains one of Rome's richest roads in art and history, and after a two-century decline, from the 1950s onwards the road's fame was renewed to be one of the city's most prestigious locations.

== History ==
In Rome, since the early Middle Ages, while the political and representative heart of the city seemed to have remained on the Capitoline Hill, the area of the ancient Campus Martius developed into one of the most densely populated districts (abitato). The maze of narrow alleys was criss-crossed by three narrow thoroughfares: the Via Papalis (lit. "papal road"), inhabited by curial employees; (Note: Today's Via dei Banchi Nuovi - via del Governo Vecchio - piazza di Pasquino - piazza di S.Pantaleo - piazza d'Aracoeli - Campidoglio - Stradone di S.Giovanni) the Via Peregrinorum (lit. "pilgrims' road") artisan and business road; (Note: Today's Via dei Banchi Vecchi - Via del Pellegrino - Via dei Giubbonari) and the Via Recta (lit. "straight road", a name common to many roads in medieval Rome). This was used above all by pilgrims coming from the north and was home to small businesses. (Note: Today's Via dei Coronari) The three roads converged to the north towards the Angels' Bridge, which was therefore the bottleneck of the city's traffic. As Dante Alighieri described in the Divine Comedy, (Note: Dante Aligheri: Inferno, canto XVIII, vv. 28–33) in 1300 Pope Boniface VIII (r. 1294–1303) ordered a two-way traffic system to be set up to avoid traffic jams or panic as a response to the dense crowds on Angels' Bridge.

After Pope Martin V (r. 1417–1431) returned to Rome in 1420 at the end of the Western Schism, the influx of pilgrims increased significantly again, especially in the Jubilee years. On 29 December 1450, the last day of the Holy Year, a stampede broke out on the bridge that killed more than 300 people. As a result of the catastrophe, Pope Nicholas V (r. 1447–1455), the first Renaissance pope who systematically dealt with Roman town planning, ordered the Angels' Bridge to be cleared of stalls and shops; the first urban planning measures in the area were initiated, defining in his programme the abovementioned three streets as the city's main ones. Starting with Nicholas, the policy of the popes was to leave the control of the Capitoline Hill area to the Roman nobility, concentrating urban development on the Tiber bend and the Vatican, made important by the pilgrimage to Saint Peter and the jubilees.

In 1475, Pope Sixtus IV (r. 1471–1484) ordered the Ponte Sisto, named after him, to be built across the Tiber (Note: Inscription at the east end of Ponte Sisto: XYSTVS IIII PON MAX / AD VTILITATEM PRO PEREGRINAEQUE MVLTI/ TVDINIS AD IVBILEVM VENTVRAE PONTEM/ HVNC QUEM MERITO RVPTVM VOCABANT A FVN/ DAMENTIS MAGNA CVRA ET IMPENSA RESTI/ TVIT XYSTVM QUE SVO DE NOMINE APPELLARI/ VOLVIT (Sixtus IV, Supreme Pontiff, for the usefulness of the Roman people and of the multitude of pilgrims who will be coming to the Jubilee, with great care and expense, restored from the foundations this bridge which they properly were calling "Broken", and he willed that it be called "Sisto" after his own name) (Fig.)) in order to relieve the pilgrimage route across the Angels' Bridge and to connect the rioni of Regola and Trastevere. At the same time he ordered the restoration of Via Pelegrinorum and the area around the Campo de' Fiori. (Note: Inscription of the Via Florea: QVAE MODO PVTRIS ERAS ET OLENTI SORDIDA COENO PLENAQVE DEFORMI MARTIA TERRA SITV EXVIS HANC TVRPEM XISTO SVB PRINCIPE FORMAM OMNIA SVNT NITIDIS CONSPICIENDA LOCIS DIGNA SALVTIFERO BEBENTA PREMIA XISTO O QUANTVM EST SVMMO DEBILITA ROMA DVCI "VIA FLOREA" BAPTISTA ARCHIONIVS ET LVDOVICVS MARGANIVS CVRATORES VIAR ANNO SALVTIS MCCCCLXXXIII (You field of Mars, who before were decaying and filthy with foul-smelling slime, filled with ugly neglect, under Pope Sixtus [ IV ] doff this shameful condition. Everything is admirable in clean surroundings. A worthy reward is due to Sixtus, bringer of health. How much Rome owes to its supreme leader.) (Fig.)) According to the chronicler Stefano Infessura, however, strategic reasons aside from reducing traffic were also important for these projects. Until then it had been very difficult for the pope to carry out urban interventions within the Aurelian Walls, mainly because of the power of the noble families of folk background, but Sixtus could use the revenues of the jubilee to carry out the works in the city. When the holy year was over, he changed the responsibilities of the Conservatori (the chief magistrates of Rome's commune), who until then had the power to curb papal initiatives in Rome, and reinforced the possibility of expropriating land and buildings for public utility. Aim of the pope was the reduction of the property income of the local nobility, and the redevelopment of the three main streets of the city.

The successors of Sixtus IV, Innocent VIII (r. 1484–1492); Alexander VI (r. 1492–1503); and Pius III (r. 1503), continued the Sistine urban planning policy, often completing the works begun by Pope della Rovere. Among them, in 1497 Alexander VI ordered the widening of the Via Peregrinorum (Note: Inscription at the entrance to the Via del Pellegrino: ALEX VI PONT MAX POST INSTAVRATAM ADRIANI MOLEM ANGVSTAS VRBIS VIAS AMPLIARI IVSSIT MCCCCLXXXXVII (Alexander VI. Pont. Max. ordered to widen the narrow streets of the town after the restoration of the Castel Sant'Angelo)(Fig.)) and the opening of the Porta Settimiana through the Aurelian Walls. The latter work was a precondition for the future construction of Via della Lungara on the right bank of the Tiber from Ponte Sisto to St. Peter's Basilica.

=== The project of Pope Julius II ===
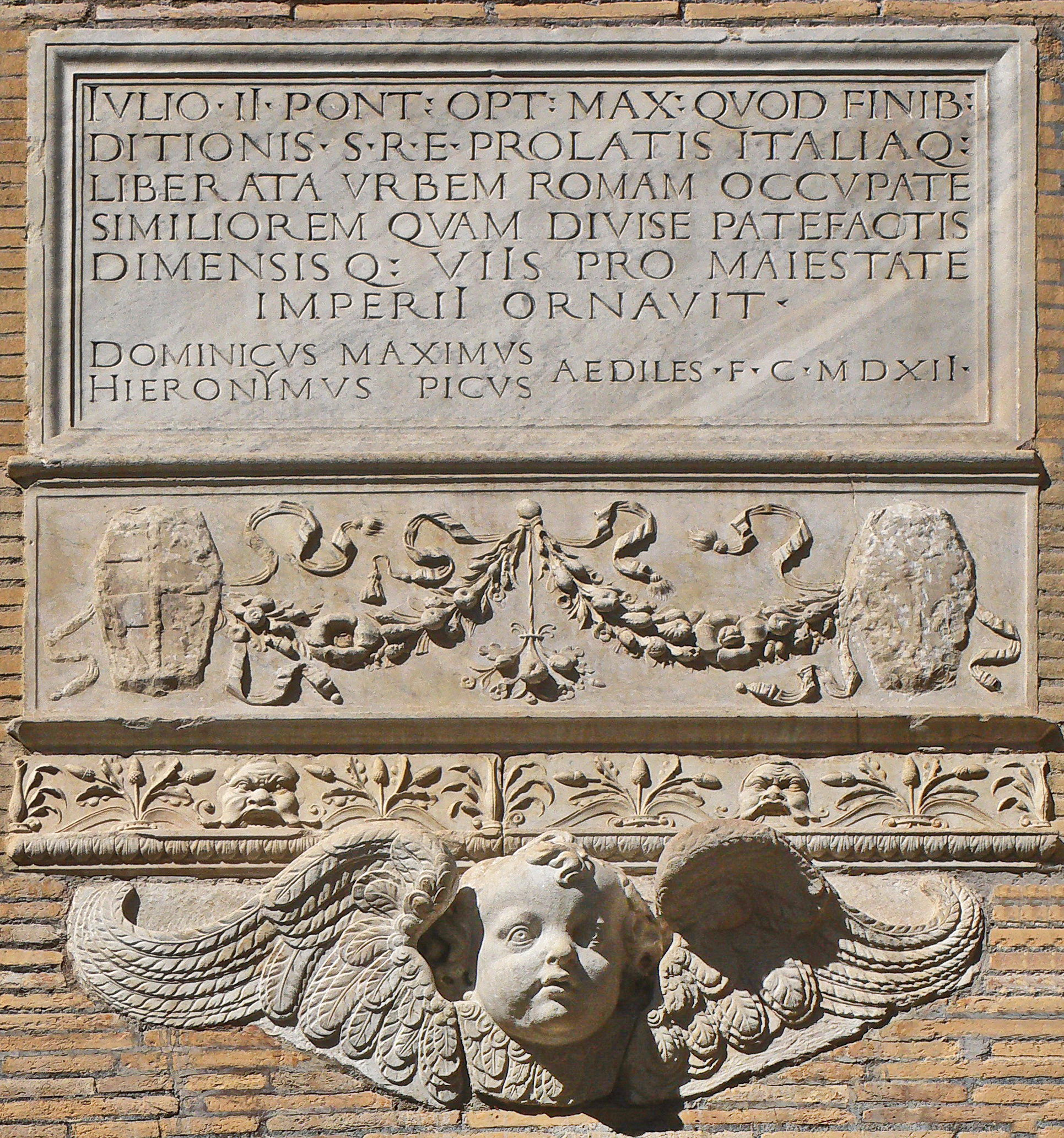
Inscription by Julius II, 1512

In addition to reconstructing St. Peter's Basilica, Julius II implemented multiple projects in the framework of Rome's urban renewal (Renovatio Romae) in the Ponte, Parione, Sant'Eustachio and Colonna rioni, a task which was started forty years before by his uncle, Pope Sixtus IV. One of the most important projects was the creation of two new straight streets on the left and right banks of the Tiber: the Via Giulia on the left bank, a new grand avenue through the most densely populated quarter of Rome, from the Ponte Sisto to the Florentine merchant quarter on the Tiber bend, and the Via della Lungara along the right bank, a straight road from the Porta Settimiana in Trastevere to the Hospital of Santo Spirito in the Borgo. Both roads–designed by the pope's favourite architect Donato Bramante– flanked the Tiber and were closely connected to it. The Lungara had the dual aim to relieve the pilgrimage route to Saint Peter and transport goods coming from the Via Aurelia and the Via Portuense roads towards the centre of the city. Moreover, the street, overlooking the river, was going to represent the place of the cultured and refined leisure time of the Roman upper class, who built there some of the most luxurious suburban residences in the city. The two streets, surrounded by palaces, including that of the pope's banker, Agostino Chigi, would have formed "a kind of city within the city, a garden city along the Tiber".

The main goal behind these plans was to superimpose to medieval Rome's disorderly building mesh a regular road network having the Tiber as focus; together with the new Via Alessandrina that Alexander VI opened in the Borgo and the Via dei Pettinari that connected the Trastevere on one bank and the Campidoglio on the other, the Lungara and Via Giulia created a quadrilateral network of modern roads in the city's chaotic web of narrow streets. In the original project Via Giulia was supposed to reach the Hospital of Santo Spirito in Borgo through the rebuilt Nero's Bridge.

This project had a secondary, celebrative goal to promote the Pontiff as the unifier of Italy and the renewer of Rome; in 1506, after the end of the plague, Julius overthrew the powerful Baglioni and Bentivoglio families, conquering their strongholds of Perugia and Bologna as testified in an inscription along the Via dei Banchi Nuovi. (Note: IVLIO.II.PONT:OPT:MAX:QVOD FINIB:DITIONIS.S.R.E.PROLATIS ITALIAQ:LIBERATA VRBEM ROMAM OCCVPATE SIMILIOREM QVAM DIVISE PATEFACTIS DIMENSIS Q: VIIS PRO MAIESTATE IMPERII ORNAVIT (Julius II p.o.m. who extended the power of the Holy Roman Church and freed Italy. The city of Rome, which resembled a conquered rather than a properly planned one, he embellished for the glory of the Empire))

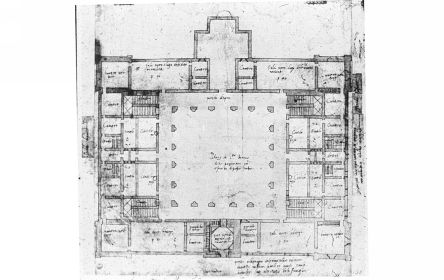
Drawing of the Palazzo dei Tribunali by Bramante, Uffizi, Florence

Aside from serving as a means of communication and representation for the Church, the road was supposed to host the city's new layman's administrative centre. A drawing by Donato Bramante discovered by Luitpold Frommel in the Uffizi shows a new huge administrative complex, the Palazzo dei Tribunali. All the notaries and courts operating in Rome had to be centralised in this building: among them, the tribunal of the Conservatori, for centuries located on the Capitoline Hill and traditionally controlled by the Roman nobility. This decision would therefore put an end to the chaos caused by various jurisdictions subject to ecclesiastical and secular authority, putting the justice under the pope's control.

Bramante's sketch shows also a representative square (the Foro Iulio) opened along the new street and facing the Palazzo dei Tribunali and the old Cancelleria (today's Palazzo Sforza-Cesarini). The square was not far from the Apostolic Camera (the pope's treasury) in Palazzo Riario and the new Palazzo della Zecca (lit. "papal mint") erected by Bramante at the edge of Via dei Banchi Nuovi (also named Canale di Ponte). By this road lay the merchants' and bankers' houses and offices, like the Altoviti, Ghinucci, Acciaiuoli, Chigi and Fugger. Close economic ties with Tuscan bankers like Agostino Chigi were sought and promoted.

As a resulting consequence of the project, the area around the Vatican and Trastevere would have been enhanced at the detriment of the Capitoline Hill, symbol of the Roman nobility's power. The plan was thus intended to separate the papacy from the city's powerful noble families (the baroni), particularly the Orsini and Colonna families, who until then had been the Pontiff's most trusted allies, replacing them with a new organisation formed by Papal legates.

Around 1508 the executive phase of the project started: the pope ordered Bramante to start expropriating and demolishing properties in the densely populated Campo Marzio to create the new street.

Giorgio Vasari wrote:

Si risolvé il Papa di mettere in strada Giulia, da Bramante indrizzata, tutti gli uffici e le ragioni di Roma in un luogo, per la commoditá ch'a i negoziatori averia recato nelle faccende, essendo continuamente fino allora state molto scomode.

The pope decided to consolidate all the offices and financial centres of Rome in one place in the Via Giulia designed by Bramante. This would have made it easier for businessmen to conduct their business, which until then had been a cumbersome process.

In August 1511 the life of Julius II was seriously threatened by an illness. Due to that, the feuding Orsini and Colonna families and the other Barons reached an agreement (known as the Pax Romana), in order to ask at the upcoming conclave the restoration of the commune authority and the abolition of various taxes. The pope's prompt recovery made the possibility of conclave fade away; Julius, under pressure from abroad, came to terms with the nobles, propagandizing the anti-papal pact as an agreement in his favour and revoking several decisions taken against the comune. Among these, he granted the Capitoline court jurisdiction over all cases between Roman citizens, except those pending before the Sacra Rota. This decision caused the interruption of the works for the new road and the Palazzo dei Tribunali, whose project was definitively abandoned when the pope died, while the planned square in front of it was forgotten. Apart from a few rusticated blocks between the Via del Gonfalone and the Vicolo del Cefalo, today nothing remains of the palazzo.

=== Via Giulia in the 16th century ===
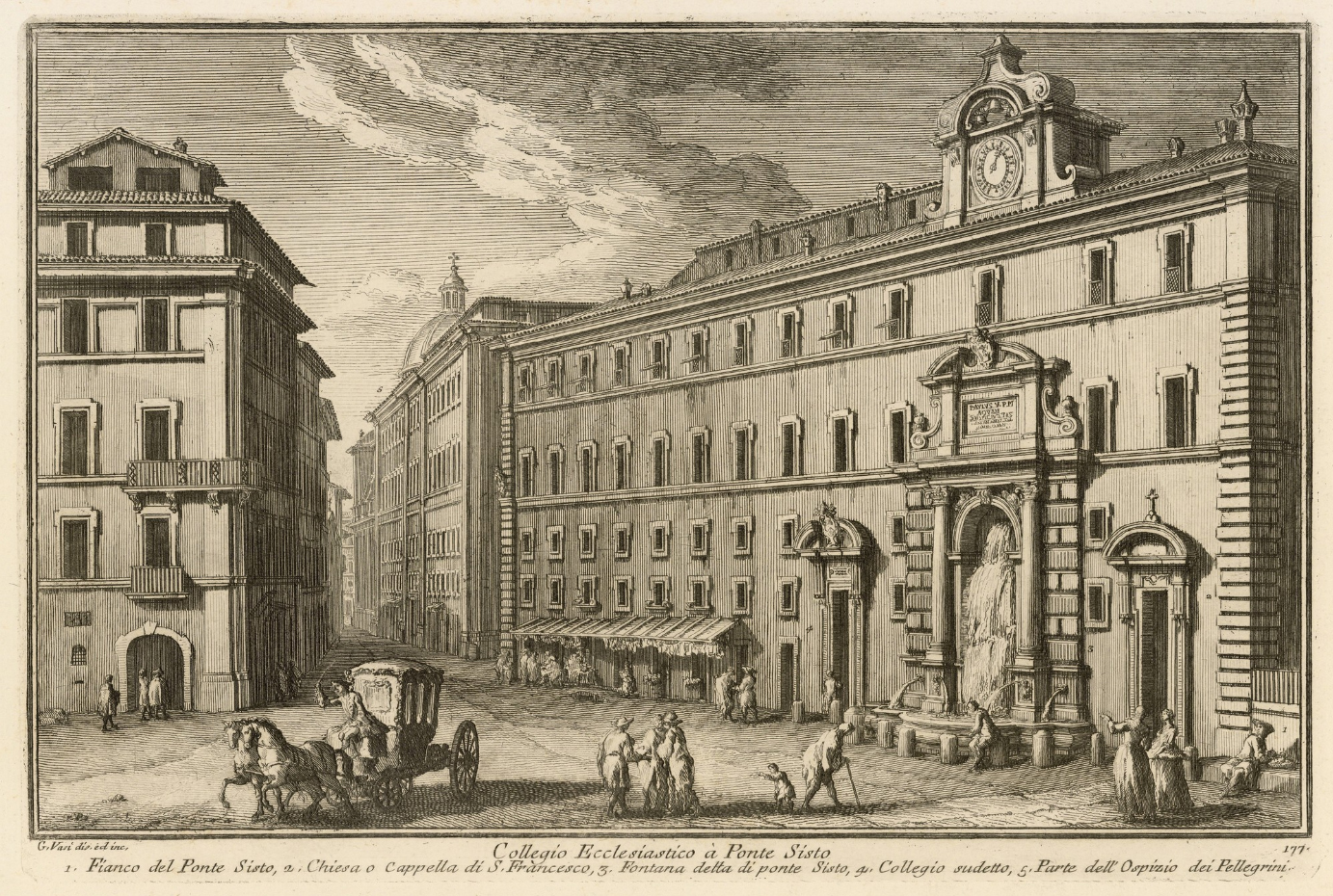
Fontanone di Ponte Sisto by the Ospizio dei Mendicanti in an etching by Giuseppe Vasi (1759)

After the death of Julius II in 1513, the demographic situation in Rome had changed: because of the wars in Italy, a large number of Lombards had emigrated to the city, settling in the northern area of the Campo Marzio, where their national church already existed. This caused a shift in the centre of gravity of the city's development, which excluded Via Giulia. Despite that, Julius' successor, Pope Leo X (r. 1513–1521) from the House of Medici, continued the work, favoring the northern end of the road, that is the stretch between the unfinished Palazzo dei Tribunali and the banking district, where his Florentine countrymen lived and the Florentine merchant community worked. With the bull of 29 January 1519, the pope granted the Florentine Compagnia della Pietà the construction of the church of San Giovanni, located also at the northern edge of the road and destined to be the parish of all Florentines living in Rome. The church was to become the symbol of Florentine economic and financial dominance in Rome, being at the centre of the area occupied by the banks, the fondachi and the residences of the Tuscan bourgeoisie and nobility living in the pope's capital. Here, important artists, such as Raphael and Antonio da Sangallo the Younger, acquired plots of land or built palaces.

In spite of these activities, the urban planning project that was at the base of the road was left unfinished. The decision to relinquish the reconstruction of Nero's bridge, the lack of connection with the Angels' Bridge and the Borgo and the abandonment of the plan for the centralisation of the courts meant that the road became an unused fragment of an abandoned project. The central and southern parts of the street suffered most for this situation. The area south of the church of San Biagio–the central part of the Via Giulia around the Monte dei Planca Incoronati, cut in half by the new road with an act of force of the pope against one of the most powerful families of the city nobility– became a slum filled with inns, brothels, and infamous locations like Piazza Padella, a venue known for duels and stabbings up to the end of the 19th century and demolished in the 1930s. This area, lying between Via del Gonfalone, Via delle Carceri, Via di Monserrato and the Tiber, was a major district of ill-repute since the Middle Ages; a manuscript from 1556 reports about the quarter around the eventually demolished church of San Niccolò degli Incoronati hosted "... 150 houses of very simple people, whores and dubious persons ...". The degradation of this part of the road is to be attributed to a decision of the Planca themselves, who, in contrast to the popes' objective of creating a prestigious road, preferred to rent their properties to prostitutes and malefactors, subjects who paid higher rents than the artisans.

South of the Planca's monte lay the Castrum Senense; this quarter (its name castrum–"fort"–came from the numerous towers that dotted the area at the time), stretching from the church of Santa Aurea, today Santo Spirito dei Napoletani towards south, got this name in the Middle Ages because it was mainly inhabited by people from Siena. At this end of the Via Giulia, the Farnese family drew up a well-defined architectural development plan, started with the erection of their residence between 1517 and 1520. The Farnese decided to turn their back against the street, orienting the main façade of their gigantic palace towards Campo de' Fiori and the centre of the city, and using the road only as a service route. Under Pope Paul III (r. 1534–1549), Cardinal Girolamo Capodiferro decided to build his palace near the Farnese palace, but he too chose to turn his palazzo's gardens towards Via Giulia. The decision to avoid the overlooking of the noble residences along the street was probably due to the degraded state of the area, which housed several brothels.

Starting with the middle of the sixteenth century there was an attempt to rehabilitate this area by building welfare facilities. The church and the hospitals of the brotherhood of the Trinity of the Pilgrims (Italian: Confraternita della Santissima Trinità dei Pellegrini) were erected in a place named Postribolo di Ponte Sisto ("Ponte Sisto's Brothel"). In 1586, architect Domenico Fontana built on the orders of Pope Sixtus V (r. 1585–1590) the Ospizio dei Mendicanti (lit. "Beggar's Hospice") thus marking the southern end of the Via Giulia. The hospice was established to solve the begging problem in the city and was given a yearly endowment of 150,000 scudi, enough to employ 2,000 people.

At the beginning of the 16th century, it had become fashionable for the various nations and city-states to have their own churches built in Rome: these were known as the chiese nazionali. The rioni of Regola and Ponte, along the processional and pilgrim roads, were the preferred locations, and Via Giulia, because of its proximity to Saint Peter and the commercial area, became a favourite place to erect the shrines with the annexed hospitals and inns for the pilgrims. The Florentines, the Sienese, and the Neapolitans had their churches built along the road (the San Giovanni, the Santa Caterina, and Santo Spirito respectively), while the Bolognese (San Giovanni e Petronio), Spanish (Santa Maria in Monserrato), English (San Tommaso di Canterbury) and Swedish (Santa Brigida) churches were built in the nearby zones of the Regola rione.

Despite all these construction activities, the character of the street did not change: brotherhoods, nobility, thieves, upper middle class and prostitutes lived next to each other in the street, which remained an axis of service. The poet Annibal Caro in his comedy Gli Straccioni ("The Rags") describes the street as an ill-famed place.

At the end of the 16th century, Via Giulia's path was defined for good; it ended by the Florentine quarter to the north and the Ospizio dei Mendicanti to the south. It became less of a major commercial street and more a busy promenade and a place for celebrations, processions (such as that of the ammantate, poor girls which were dowried by the goldsmiths of Sant'Eligio degli Orefici) and races.

Via Giulia; Particular from Almae urbis Romae prospectus by Antonio Tempesta (1645)

=== Via Giulia in the 17th century ===
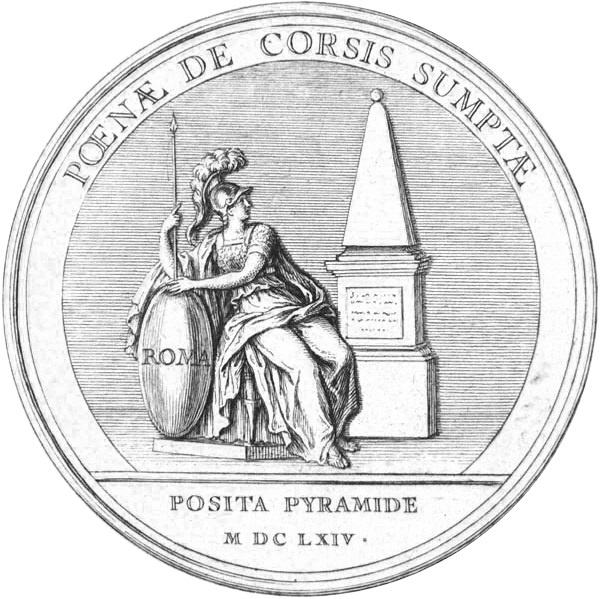
Etching representing a medal minted under Louis XIV to commemorate the disbanding of the Corsican Guard after the Via Giulia incident; the "pyramid of infamy" is in the background

In the baroque period three major works changed the face of the street: to the north, the completion (except for the façade) of San Giovanni dei Fiorentini, a work by Carlo Maderno; in the centre, the construction of the Carceri Nuove (lit. "New Prisons") based on a project by Antonio Del Grande; to the south, the reconstruction of Palazzo Falconieri, by Francesco Borromini. San Giovanni, thanks to its slender dome, gave the street a vanishing point; the prisons, erected near the never-built palace of the courts of the Bramante, revived Julius II's idea of bringing the Justitia Papalis into the street; Palazzo Falconieri, finally, added value to the street in an area characterised until then only by Palazzo Farnese, which turns its back on Via Giulia. Beside these works are worth of mention the churches of Sant'Anna dei Bresciani and Santa Maria del Suffragio, and various renovations and mergers, such as that of Palazzo Varese, by Maderno, and Palazzo Ricci. In the same period two colleges were established in Via Giulia: the Collegio Ghislieri, another work by Carlo Maderno, and the Collegio Bandinelli, near San Giovanni dei Fiorentini, by Del Grande.

In order to supply the quarter with sufficient drinking water, Pope Paul V (r. 1605–1621) had the Aqua Paola extend over the Tiber, reaching the Regola rione and the Ghetto. In 1613, the Fontanone di Ponte Sisto (lit. "The Big Fountain of the Sistine Bridge") was built on the façade of the beggars' hospice on Via Giulia.

Despite these interventions the meaning of the street in the city structure did not change. The expansion of the city towards the Campo Marzio plain, begun by Leo X with the construction of Via di Ripetta, and the urban planning initiatives of Gregory XIII (r. 1572–1585) and Sixtus V had already irreparably relegated Via Giulia to a peripheral position with respect to the new city centre.

At the end of the 17th century, the road took on a triple face, which it would maintain for another 150 years: an area of building speculation in the north, a detention centre in the middle, and an elegant location in the south, theater of feasts and games.

Among the latter, a tournament held in 1603 by Tiberio Ceuli at Palazzo Sacchetti, and a Saracen tournament organised in 1617 by Cardinal Odoardo Farnese at the Oratorio della Compagnia della Morte, for which he invited eight cardinals. During the summer months the street was sometimes flooded for the pleasure of the common people and the nobility. One of the most glamorous celebrations was held by the Farnese in 1638 to celebrate the birth of the French dauphin, the future king Louis XIV. Via Giulia hosted buffalo races, parades of carnival floats, and in 1663 the organisation of a horse race with naked hunchbacks during Carnival is handed down. During the carnival, Via Giulia hosted several feasts promoted by the Florentines.

On 20 August 1662, the road was the scene of an episode that had important consequences: a brawl near the Ponte Sisto bridge between soldiers of the Corsican Guard and French soldiers belonging to the retinue of Louis XIV's ambassador Charles III de Créquy resulted in the withdrawal of the ambassador from Rome and the French invasion of Avignon. In order to avoid worse consequences, the pope was forced to humiliate himself, disbanding the Corsican Guard and erecting a "pyramid of infamy" at the Corsicans' barracks near the street.

=== Development in the 18th and 19th centuries ===
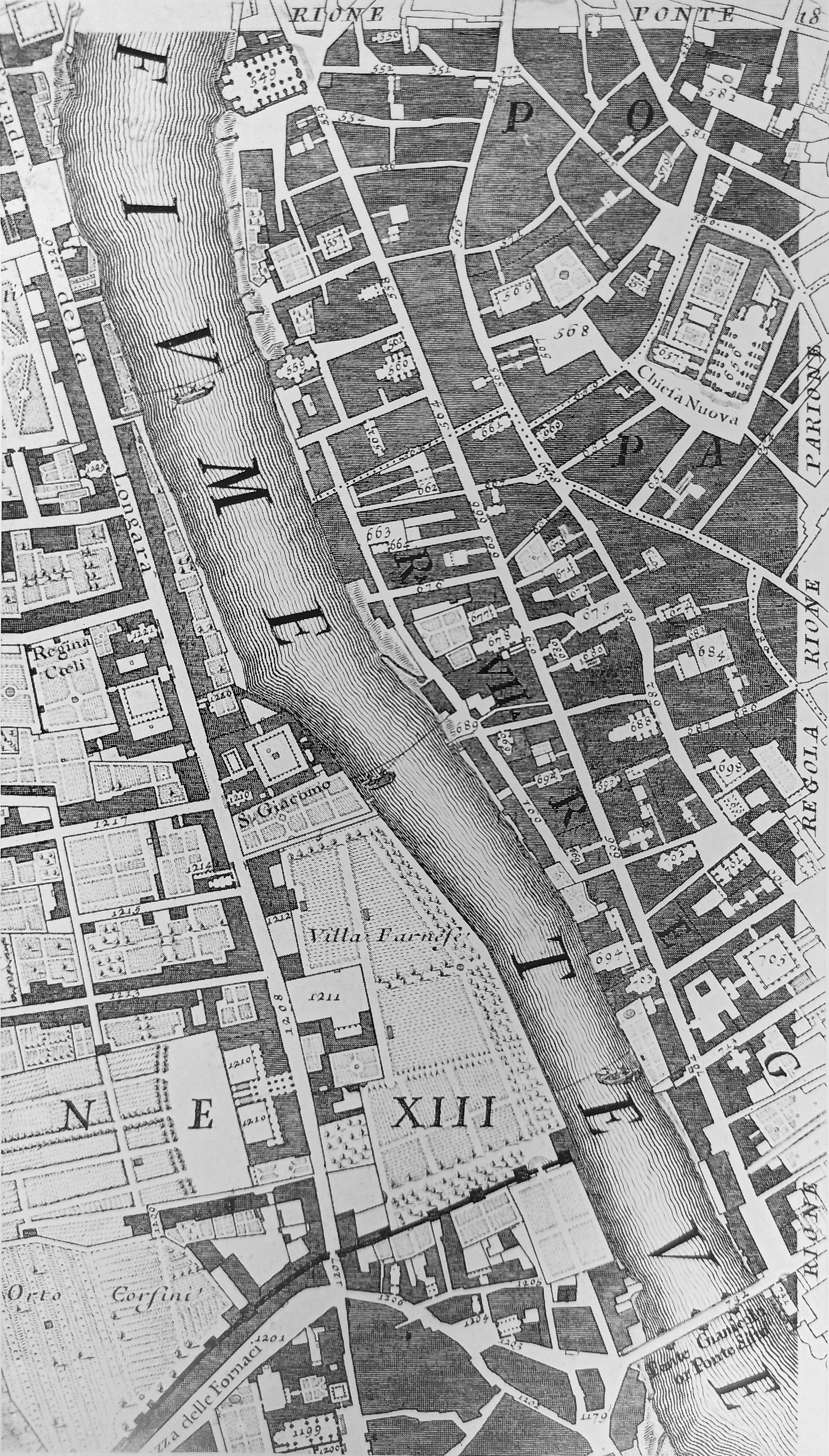
Via Giulia (the straight road to the right of the Tiber) in the Map of Rome by Giambattista Nolli, first published in 1748

From an architectural point of view in the 18th century there were only minor interventions in the street: the development of the city was now defined in the Tridente and Quirinale areas, both far away from the Tiber bend, and Via Giulia remained cut off. The only works of some importance were the façade of San Giovanni dei Fiorentini, by Alessandro Galilei, the church of Santa Maria dell'Orazione e Morte, by Ferdinando Fuga, and the two small churches of San Filippo Neri and San Biagio della Pagnotta, rebuilt respectively by Filippo Raguzzini and Giovanni Antonio Perfetti.

In this period too the Via Giulia was famous as a venue for parties and entertainment for the common people: in 1720 the Sienese held a festival to celebrate the promotion of Marc'Antonio Zondadari to Grand Master of the Order of Malta; Fireworks were set off near the Fontanone di Ponte Sisto; two triumphal arches were raised above the street, one near Santo Spirito and the other near Palazzo Farnese; and the Fountain of the Mascherone poured wine for the people instead of water.

Under Pope Clement XI's (r. 1720–1721) rule, the beggars housed in the Ospizio dei Mendicanti were transferred to the San Michele a Ripa. The building was afterwards occupied by both poor unmarried girls (zitelle in the Romanesco dialect) and a congregation made up of 100 priests and 20 clerics; the latter prayed for the souls of deceased priests. As such, the building was nicknamed the Ospizio dei cento preti ("Hospice of the Hundred Priests").

In the nineteenth century, in accordance with the process of degradation of the building heritage that affected the whole city, Via Giulia underwent a myriad of interventions of superfetation, superelevation, and occupation of the free spaces. In this period only a few new buildings or restoration projects were realised: among them were the youth prison (Palazzo del Gonfalone) (1825–27), the renovation of the Armenian Hospice next to the church of San Biagio (1830), the new façade of the Santo Spirito dei Napoletani (1853), and the Collegio Spagnuolo (1853) by Pietro Camporese and Antonio Sarti, which is the only building of architectonic quality among them. However, this did not stop the general decline of the street that started in the middle of the 18th century. The nobility abandoned the palaces on the street to move to the new centre of urban life in the Campo Marzio plain, and in their place the road hosted artisans, assuming an aspect of abandonment and survival.

=== Via Giulia since 1870 ===
After Rome became the capital of the Kingdom of Italy in 1870, the Tiber (known for flooding, particularly in Campus Martius plain) had its banks worked on in 1873 by constructing Lungoteveres, which since 1888 were erected along the road and required the church of Sant'Anna dei Bresciani to be torn down. The Lungoteveres completely cut off Via Giulia from the Tiber and prevented the loggias and gardens of the palaces facing the river, such as the Palazzi Medici-Clarelli, Sacchetti, Varese, and Falconieri from having a view of the river. Moreover, the Fontanone of Ponte Sisto was demolished together with the Beggars' Hospice in 1879 and rebuilt in 1898 on the opposite side of the Ponte Sisto in what is now Piazza Trilussa.

During the fascist period, in 1938 Benito Mussolini ordered the construction of a wide avenue between Ponte Mazzini and the Chiesa Nuova. Because of that, significant building demolitions (including that of the palazzi Ruggia and Planca Incoronati and of Piazza Padella) took place in the central section of Via Giulia between Via della Barchetta and Vicolo delle Prigioni. The project was stopped because of the beginning of World War II, and to this day the resulting empty plot has only been partially filled by the new building of the Liceo Classico Virgilio.

Starting with the post-war years, the street regained gradually its status as one of the most prestigious streets in the city. Numerous events took place in 2008 during its 500th anniversary; some churches and palaces were restored and opened to visitors.

== Landmarks on Via Giulia ==
Via Giulia extends northwest for about one kilometre from the Piazza San Vincenzo Pallotti on the Ponte Sisto to the Piazza dell'Oro in front of the church of San Giovanni dei Fiorentini.

Map of Via Giulia in 21st century

=== 1 Palazzina Pateras Pescara (Via Giulia 251) ===
This last building in Via Giulia was built in 1924 by Marcello Piacentini on behalf of the Avvocato Pateras. Today it houses the Consulate of the French Republic in Rome.

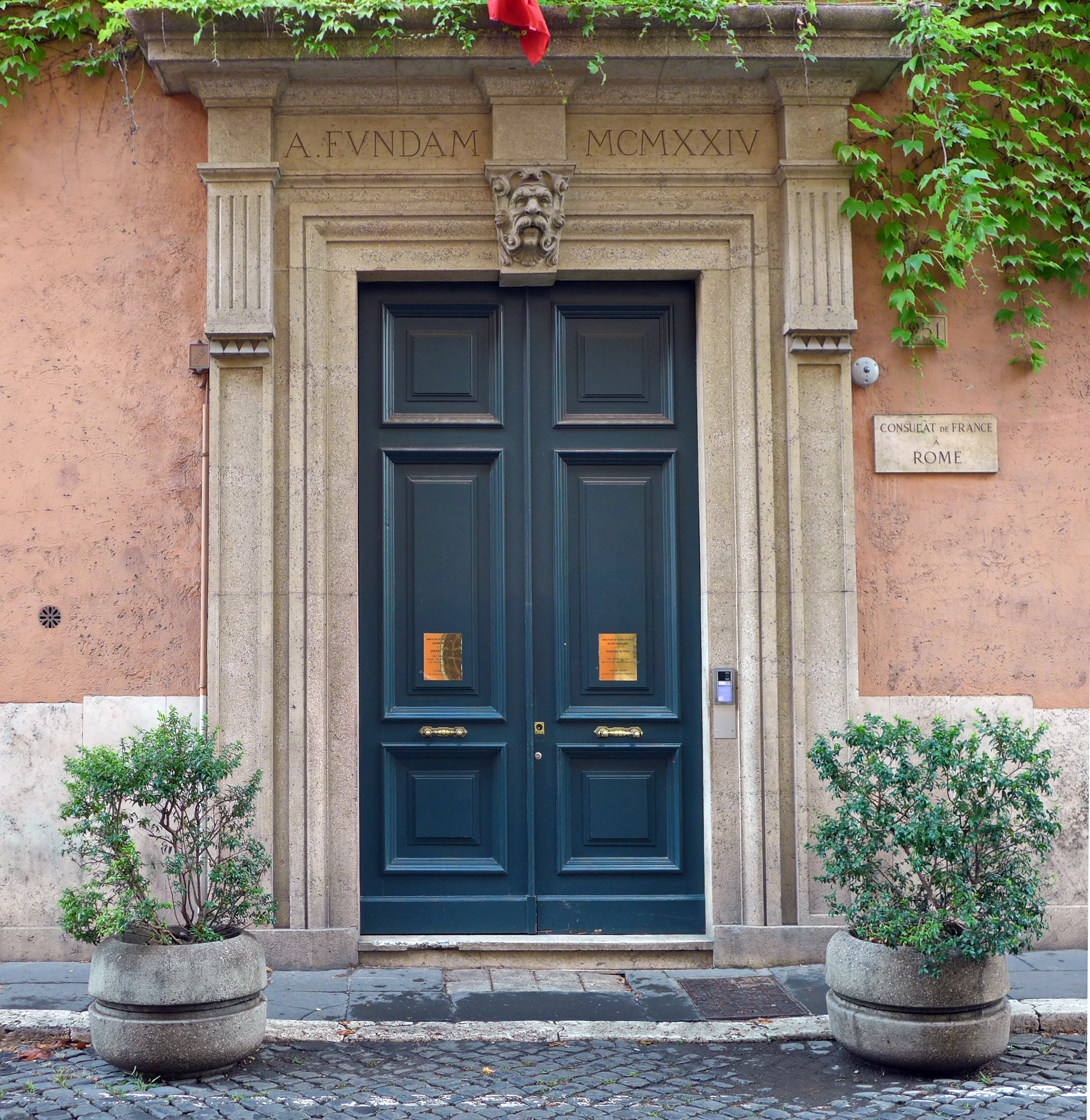
1 Palazzo Pateras Pescara

=== 2 Fontana del Mascherone ===
The fountain diagonally opposite Palazzo Farnese was built around 1626 by Carlo Rainaldi and paid for by the Farnese. It was planned in 1570 to be a public fountain fed by the Aqua Virgo aqueduct to supply people with clean drinking water. However, installation was only possible after Paul V ordered the water pipe to be extended over the Ponte Sisto in 1612. The fountain consists of an ancient large marble mascaron ("Mascherone") on a background with volutes in marble, crowned by the symbol of the Farnese, a metal Fleur-de-lis. The fountain was moved against the wall in 1903, losing most of its charm. The poet Wilhelm Waiblinger died in 1830 in the house opposite to it. (Note: Inscription on the facade of the house.)

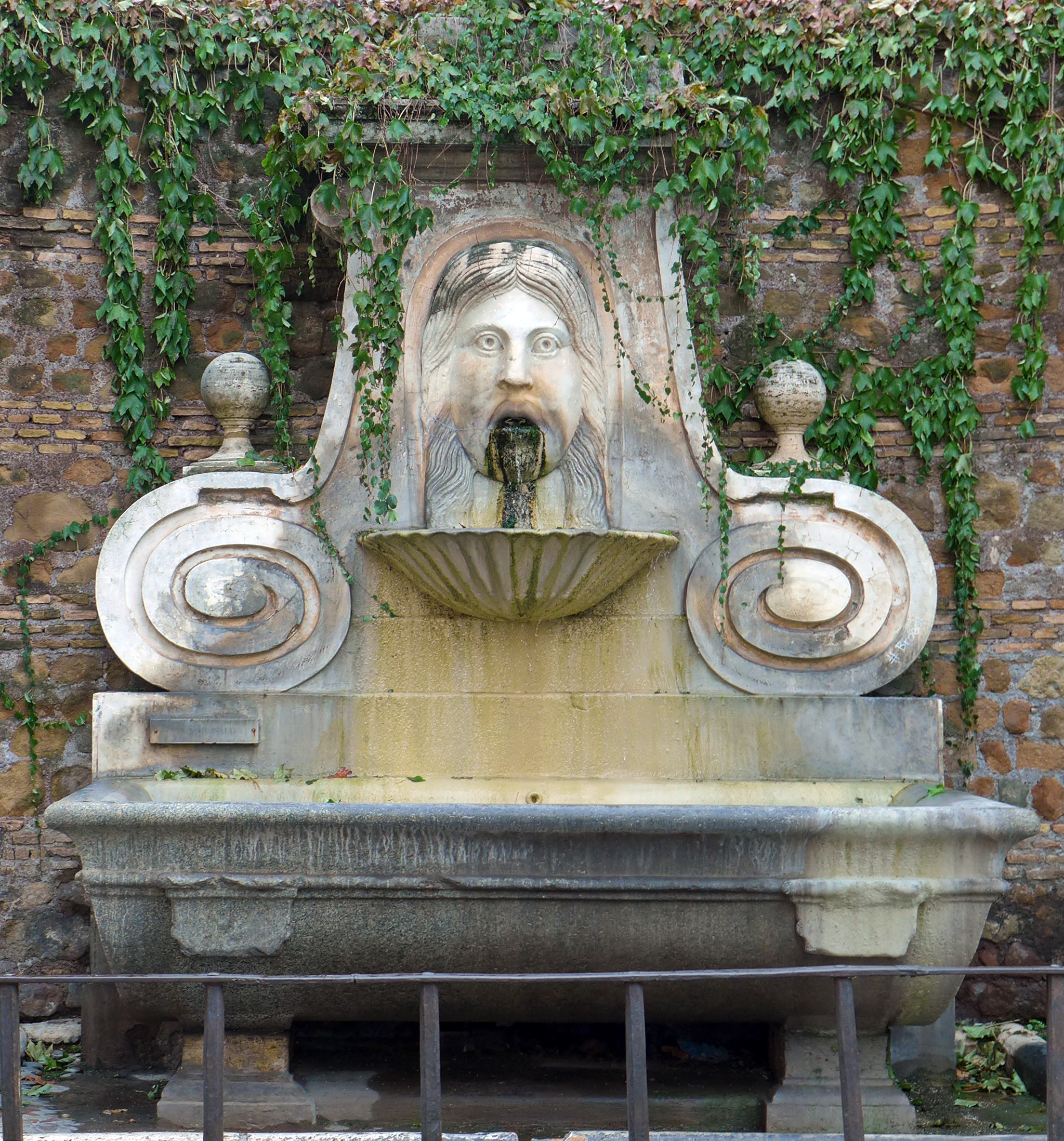
2 Fontana del Mascherone

=== 3 Palazzo Farnese (Via Giulia 186) ===
The garden façade of this palace building is oriented towards the Via Giulia. In 1549 it was designed according to Vignola's drawings and completed by Giacomo della Porta in 1589. The garden between the façade and the Via Giulia was once adorned by the Farnese bull (now in the National Archaeological Museum in Naples). The palace is now the French Embassy in Italy.

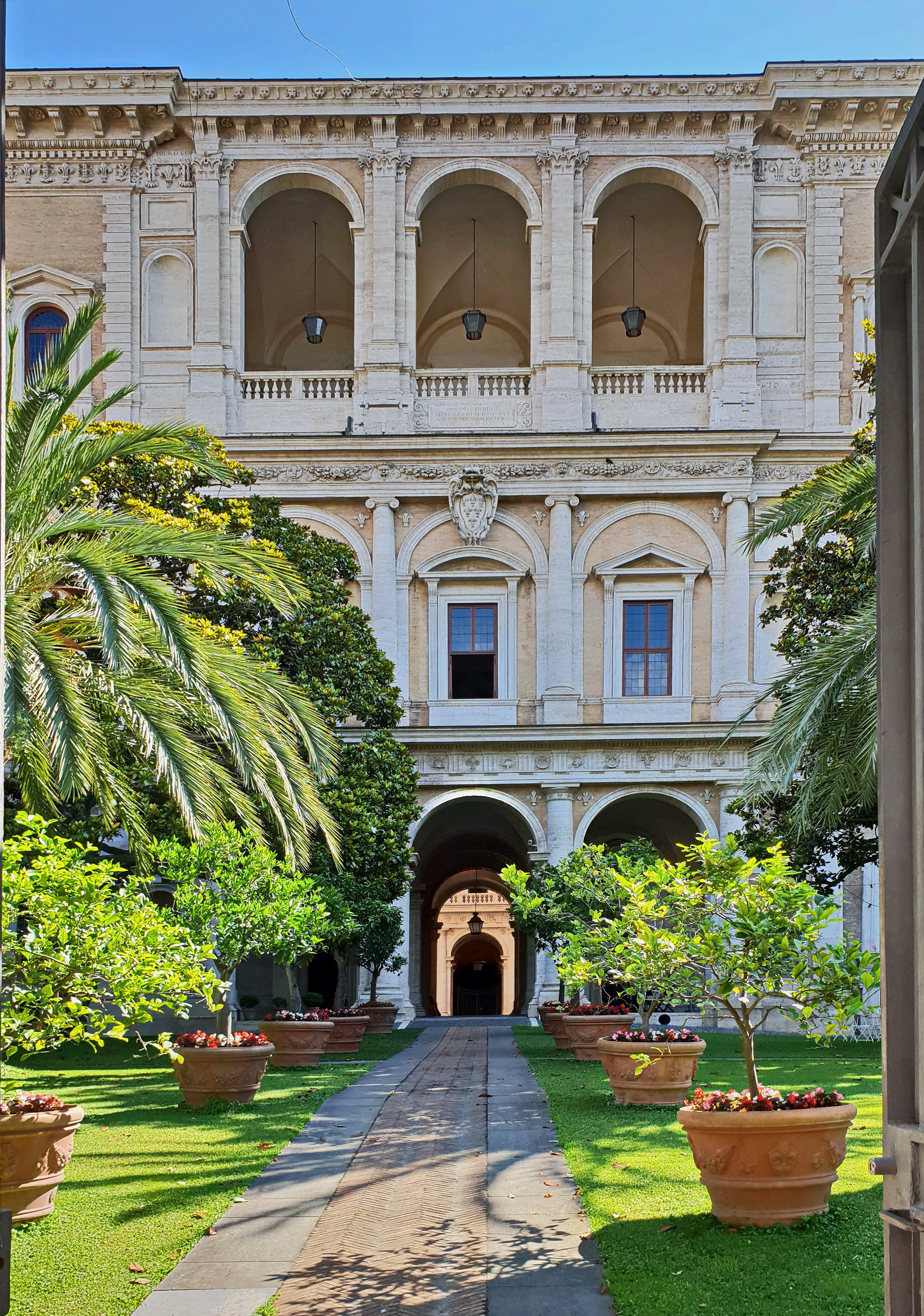
3 Palazzo Farnese

=== 3a Camerini Farnesiani (Via Giulia 253-260) ===
Behind the row of lower buildings ("Camerini Farnesiani"), which today belong to the French Embassy, lay a small palace with garden, the Palazzetto Farnese, built around 1603 by Cardinal Odoardo Farnese as his hermitage, also known as Eremo del Cardinale ("Cardinal's hermitage"). This private retreat of the Cardinal, decorated with frescoes by Giovanni Lanfranco, was accessible from Palazzo Farnese through a terrace and the Arco Farnese. The building still stands along Via Giulia, but its original internal disposition has been changed through several interventions, while its giardino segreto ("secret garden") with its loggia with three arches open on the river has been destroyed.

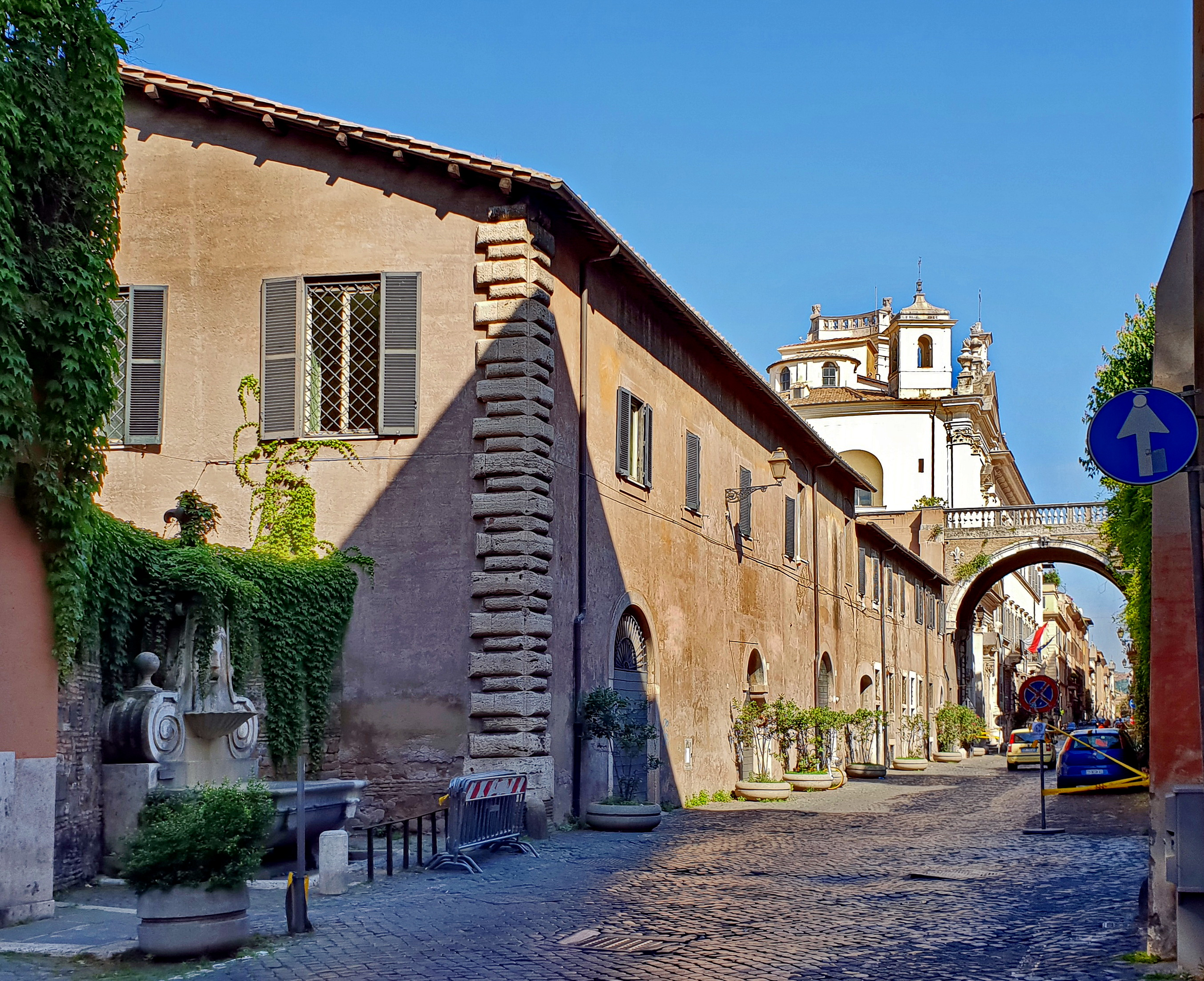
3a Camerini Farnesiani

=== 4 Arco Farnese ===
The bridge connects Via Giulia to the Palazzo Farnese. It was erected in 1603, and was used to observe festive processions, games, and horse races in Via Giulia, particularly during Carnival. The arch was part of a project conceived by Pope Paul III and never realised, which foresaw the connection of Palazzo Farnese with the Villa Farnesina in Trastevere by means of a private bridge over the river.

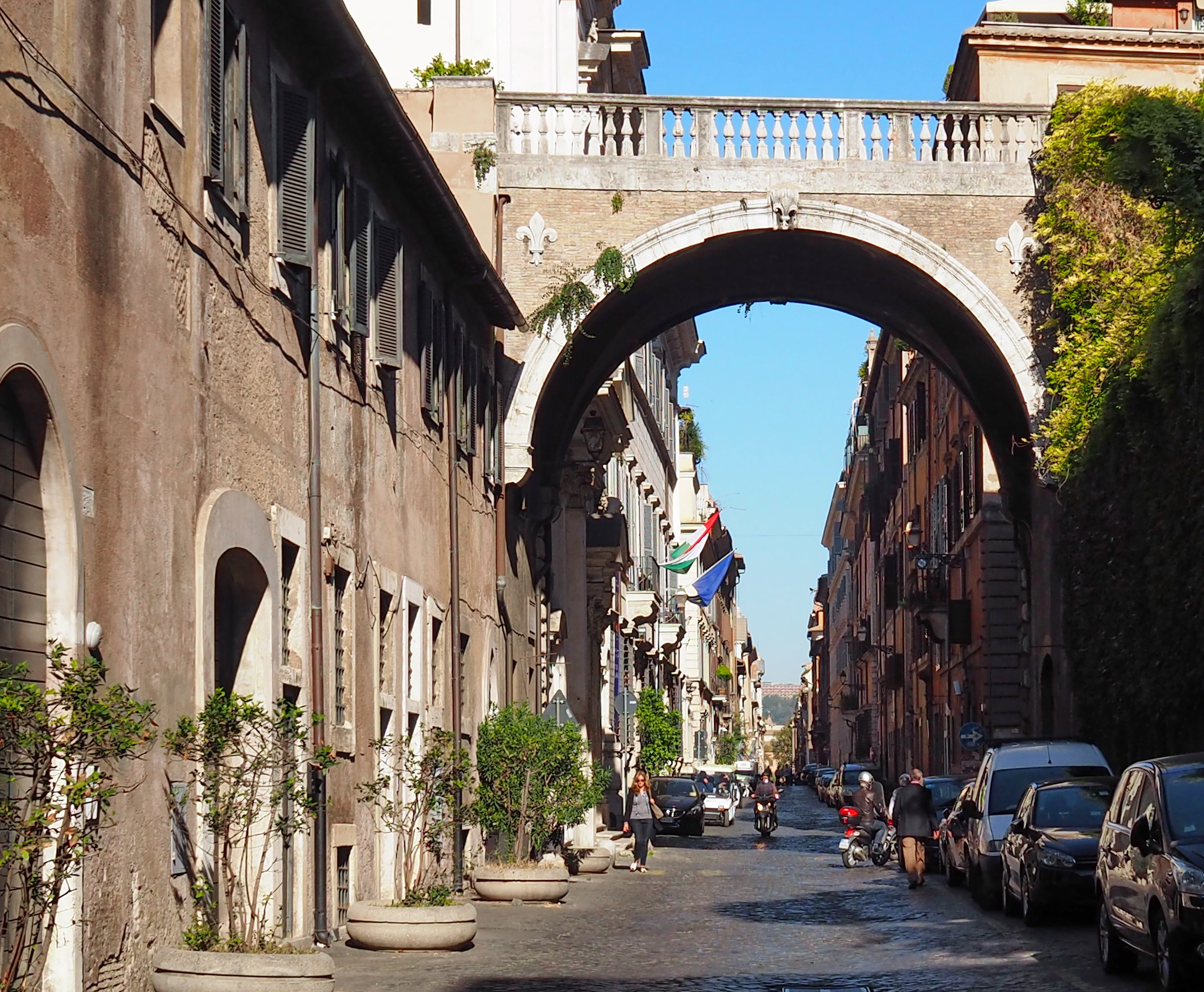
4 Arco Farnese

=== 5 Santa Maria dell'Orazione e Morte (Via Giulia ad. 262) ===
The church, built in 1575–76, is located in the immediate vicinity of Palazzo Farnese and belonged to the Compagnia della Morte ("Death's Brotherhood") founded in 1538. The fraternity was tasked with burying the dead that – having been recovered from the river or found in the area surrounding Rome – were not claimed by anyone. The building was demolished in 1733 and rebuilt by Ferdinando Fuga in 1737. Its cemetery on the banks of the Tiber was demolished when the river was regulated in 1886.

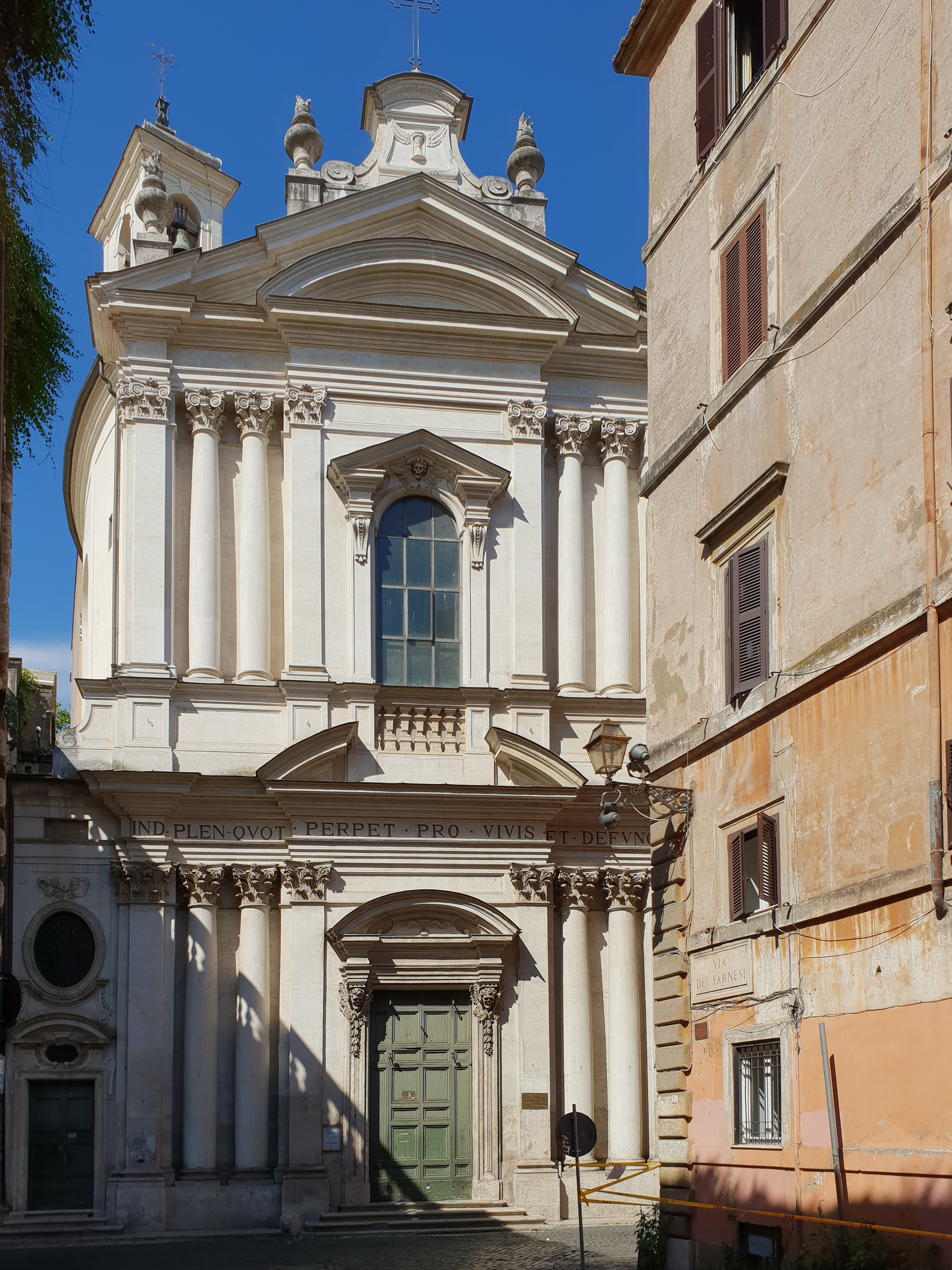
5 Santa Maria dell'Orazione e Morte

=== 6 Palazzo Falconieri also Palazzo Odescalchi Falconieri (Via Giulia 1) ===
The original building was built in the 16th century for the Roman noble family of the Ceci and directly adjoins the church of Santa Maria dell'Orazione e Morte. It was sold by the Ceci in 1574 to the Odescalchi family before being passed to the Farnese in 1606. Eventually the Florentine nobleman Orazio Falconieri bought it in 1638 for 16,000 scudi. From 1646 to 1649 he commissioned the architect Francesco Borromini to extend the palace. The sides of the façade on Via Giulia are decorated with two pilasters in the shape of large hermas with female breasts and falcon heads. The façade on the Tiber side features a three-arched loggia dating back to 1649. From 1814 Cardinal Joseph Fesch, uncle of Napoleon Bonaparte lived there, and from 1815 to 1818 he hosted his stepsister Laetitia Ramolino, the emperor's mother. In 1927 the Kingdom of Italy ceded the palace to the Hungarian State, which established it as the seat of the Hungarian Academy ("Accademia d'Ungheria"). Today, in addition to the academy, the palace is home to the Pontificium Institutum Ecclesiasticum Hungaricum in Urbe.

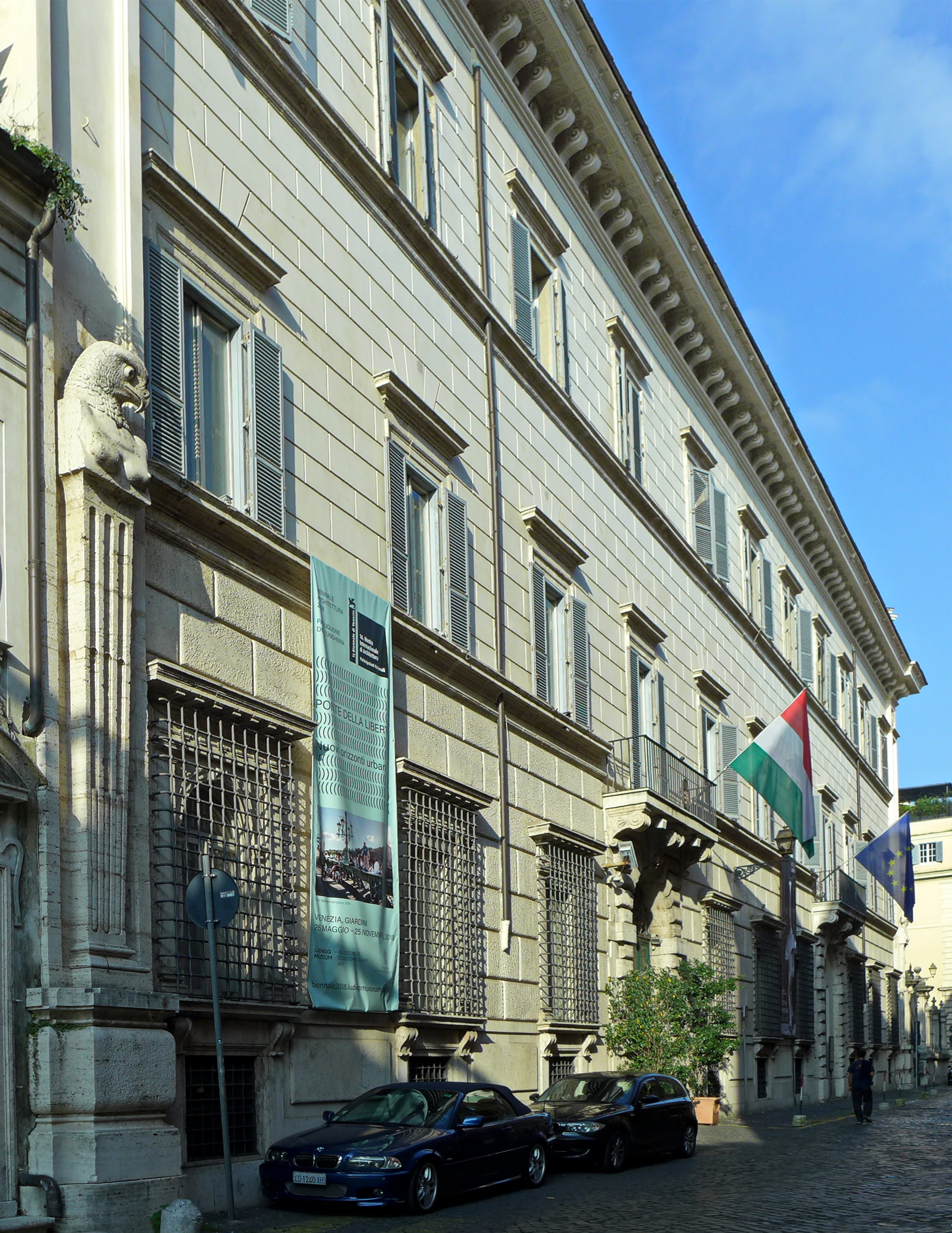
6 Palazzo Falconieri

=== 7 Palazzo Baldoca-Muccioli (Via Giulia 167) ===
The history of the palace is closely linked to the neighbouring Palazzo Cisterna. Both properties were acquired and rebuilt by the sculptor Guglielmo della Porta. Guglielmo began to work around 1546 in the service of Pope Paul III who at the death of Sebastiano del Piombo entrusted him with the lucrative office of Keeper of the Seals (Italian: Custode del Piombo). it is possible that della Porta considered the building only an investment, since he rented it in 1574 to the florentine knight Nicolò de Gaddis. The palazzo was owner later by the Baldoca and Muccioli families. At the beginning of the 20th century, the palace served as the residence of the English ambassador in Rome, Sir Rennell Rodd, who bought and had it badly restored in 1928.

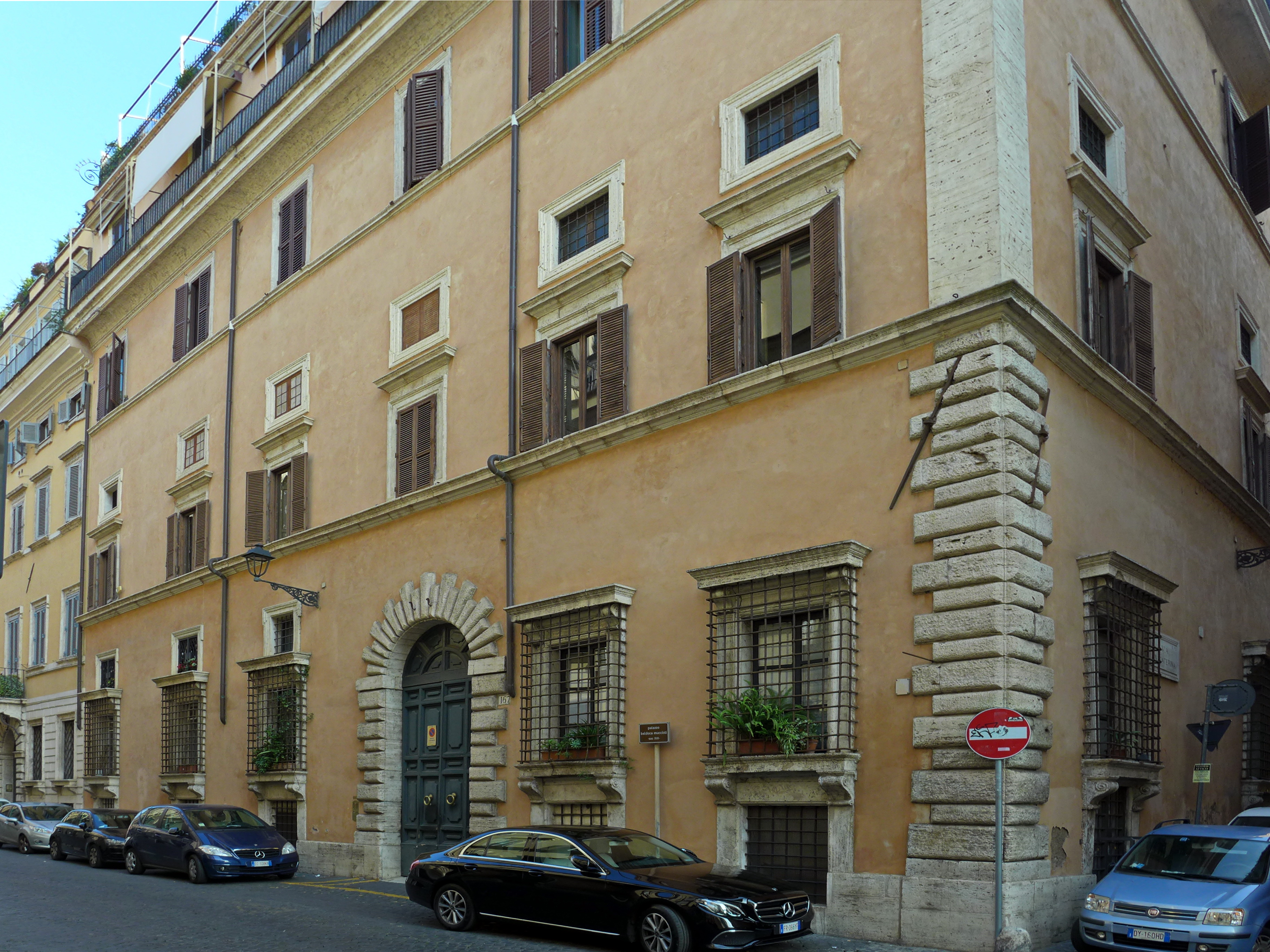
7 Palazzo Baldoca Muccioli

=== 8 Palazzo Cisterna (Via Giulia 163) ===
The Palazzo Cisterna was built by Guglielmo della Porta and served as his residence. Above the architrave of the windows on the first floor the inscription "FRANCISCVS TANCREDA ET GVILELMVS D(ella) P(orta) ME(ediolanensis) – S(culptor) CI(vis) RO(manus)" can be read. (Note: Inscription under the window lintels of Palazzo Cisterna) From a letter to a friend, it appears that the palace was completed in 1575. In 1600 Spanish missionaries acquired the palace and sold it to the Cisterna family at the beginning of the 20th century. It was partially sold to the Ducci family in the second half of the 20th century.

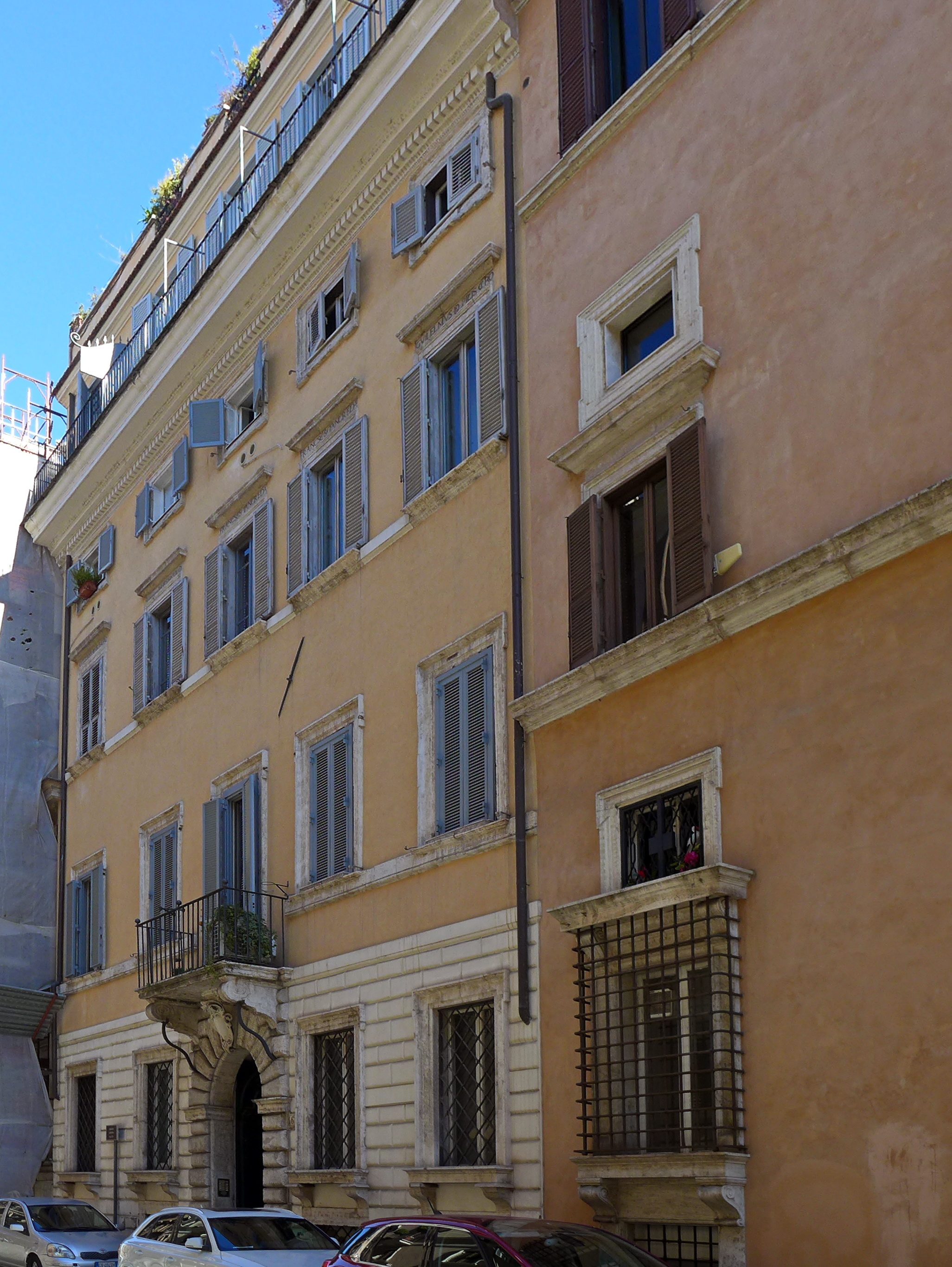
8 Palazzo Cisterna

=== 9 Santa Caterina da Siena in Via Giulia (Via Giulia ad. 151) ===
The history of this church is closely linked to the Sienese Brotherhood. A community of merchants, bankers and craftsmen from Siena had been living in what was to be Via Giulia, where at that time stood the castrum Senense since the 14th century. In 1519 the Brotherhood was canonically erected by Leo X. In 1526 they commissioned Baldassare Peruzzi to build the church in honour of their saints, an oratory, and a house for the clerics. The funds were provided by the Sienese nobility in Rome, particularly by the Dean of the College of Cardinals Giovanni Piccolomini and the banker Agostino Chigi, who alone donated 4,000 scudi. Since it was in a dilapidated state, it was rebuilt between 1766 and 1768 according to Paolo Posi's designs, while the interior decor was completed in 1775. The Archconfraternity of the Sienese still owns the building today. During Via Giulia's 500th anniversary of the street in 2008 the altarpiece by Girolamo Genga has been restored.

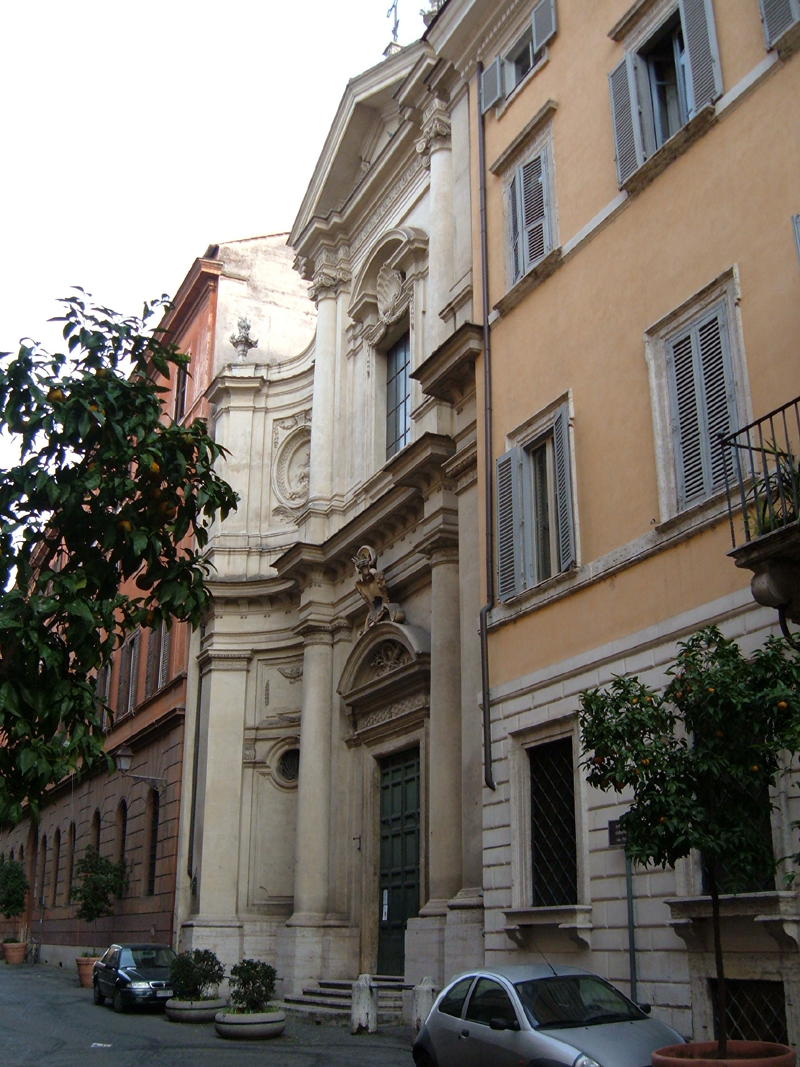
9 Santa Caterina da Siena

=== 10 Palazzo Varese (Via Giulia 14-21) ===
The palace opposite Santa Caterina da Siena was built between 1617 and 1618 by Carlo Maderno on behalf of Monsignor Diomede Varese. In 1788 Monsignor Giuseppe degli Atti Varese gave the building to the Congregation Propaganda Fide when his family line died out. After exchanging owners several times the palace finally came into the possession of the Mancini family. The front consists of two upper floors and a mezzanine, and is divided by several axes of irregularly spaced windows, which testify how the building was born by merging several pre-existing edifices. On the ground floor is the main portal and above it is a balcony on consoles, flanked by three windows each. (Note: Picture of the portal) The portal opens into the yard with three loggie, the first on arches, while the others have their entablature that rests directly on the columns. The yard originally opened to a garden by the river, now lost because of the closing of the Tiber side.

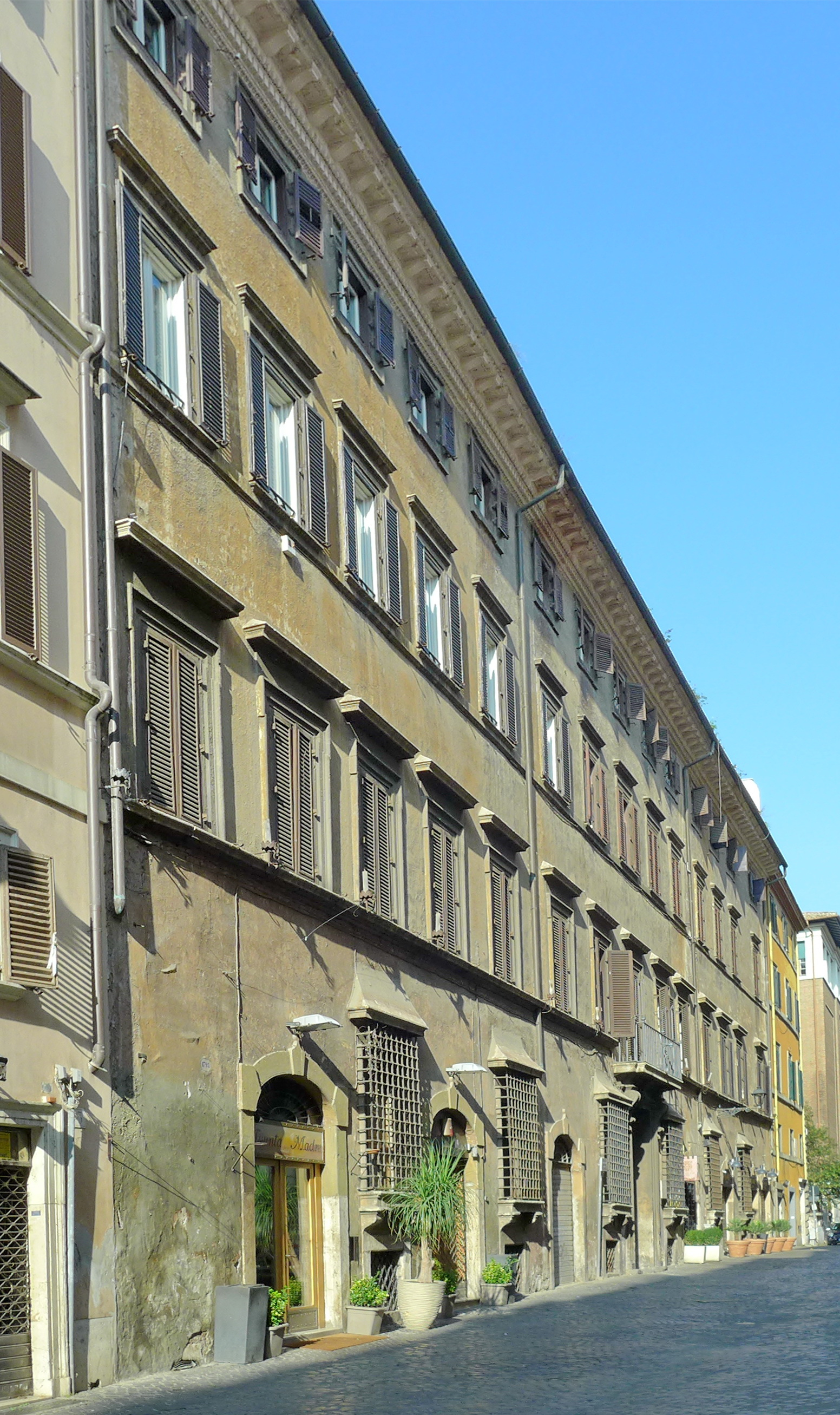
10 Palazzo Varese

=== 11 Sant'Eligio degli Orefici (Via di Sant'Eligio 9) ===
The small church is off the Via Giulia and serves as the guild church of the Roman gold- and silversmiths. Its construction is attributed to Raphael, although it is possible that after the death of the artist it was finished by Baldassare Peruzzi.

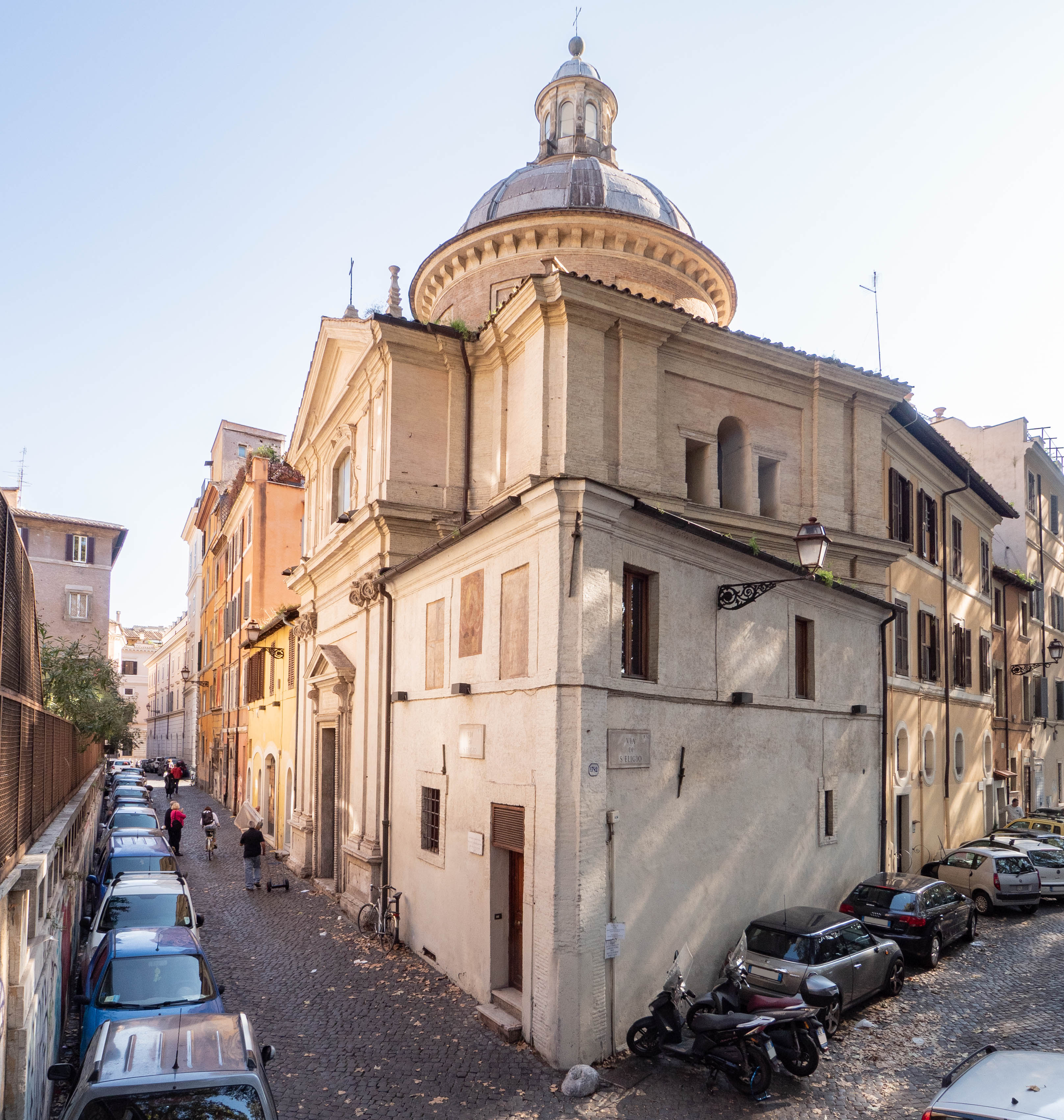
11 Sant'Eligio

=== 12 Palazzo del Collegio Spagnolo (Via Giulia 151) ===
The Palacio de Monserrat by Antonio Sarti and Pietro Camporese was built in 1862 by the will of Queen of Spain Isabella II and today is the Spanish High Centre for Ecclesiastical Studies. The centre is attached to the Spanish National Church of Santa Maria in Monserrato on the Via di Monserrato behind it, and its history is closely connected with that of the church. The erection of the college was the only major intervention in the construction of the road in the 19th century.

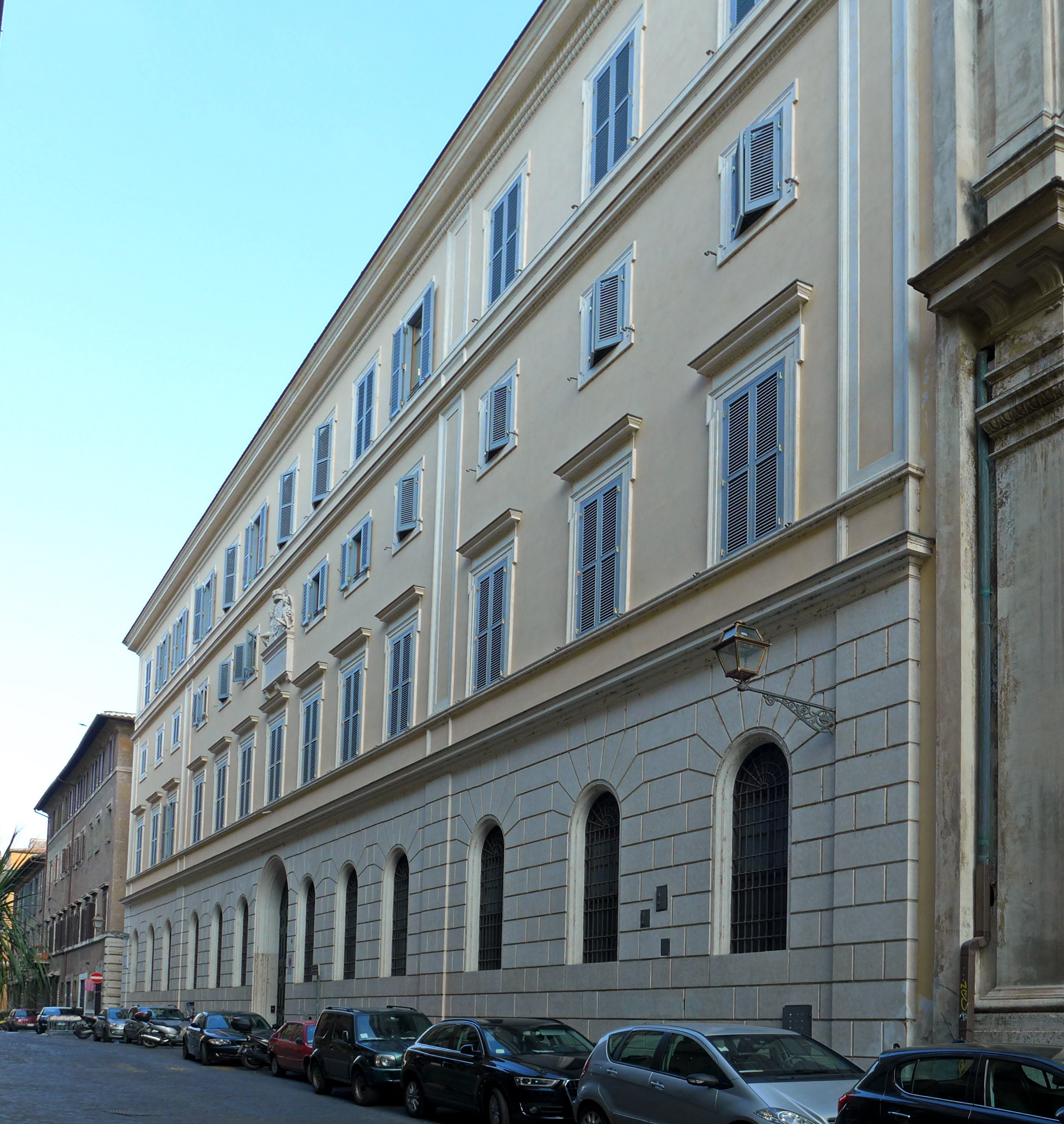
12 Collegio Spagnolo

=== 13 Liceo Statale Virgilio (Via Giulia No 35 ff.) ===
One of the most important state school complexes in Rome was built between 1936 and 1939 by Marcello Piacentini. The building complex between Via Giulia and the Lungotevere dei Tebaldi includes the façade of the Collegio Ghislieri, (Note: Dedication Inscription above the portal of the liceo.) designed by Carlo Maderno (16th century) and the church of the Santo Spirito dei Napoletani.

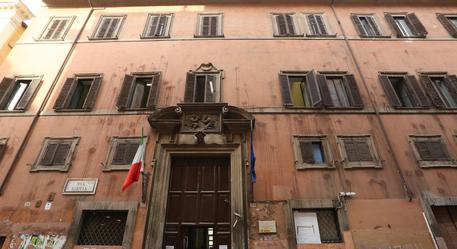
13 Liceo Virgilio

=== 14 Palazzo Ricci (Via Giulia 146) ===
The present building was originally a cluster of unconnected buildings, built at different times, opposite the Collegio Ghislieri. The building complex was merged in 1634 and 1684. The main façade facing Piazza de'Ricci shows strongly faded remains of a graffito by Polidoro da Caravaggio and Maturino da Firenze (16th century). On the side facing Via Giulia, a continuous façade gave the complex its present uniform appearance.

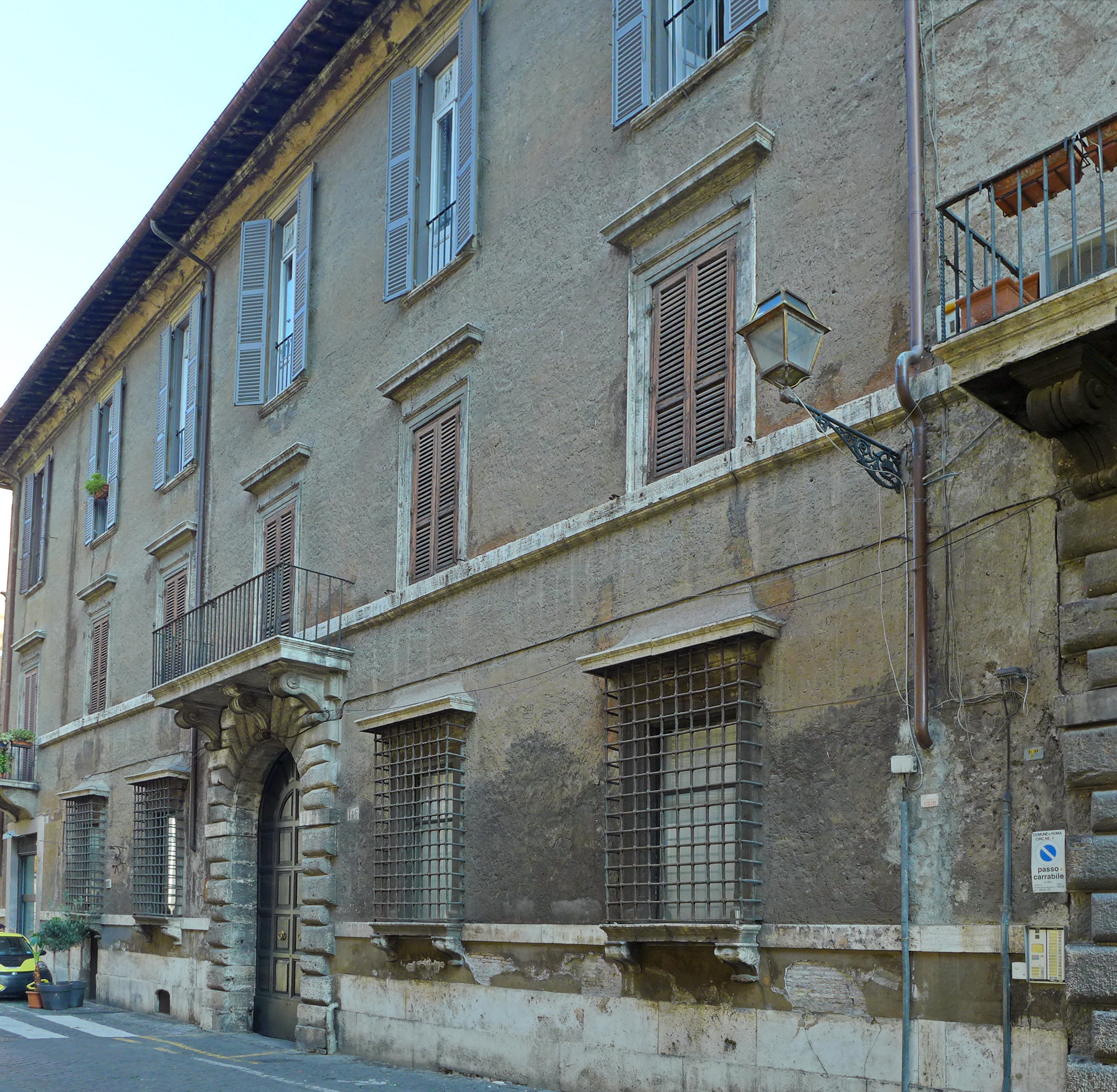
14 Palazzo Ricci

=== 15 Santo Spirito dei Napoletani (Via Giulia ad. 34) ===
In the Pius V church catalogue this church is listed under the name of Santa Aura in strada Iulia. It was dedicated to Saint Aurea, the patron saint of Ostia. A nunnery was attached to the church. In 1439 the church was restored at the expense of Cardinal Guillaume d'Estouteville. In 1572 Cardinal Innico d'Avalos d'Aragona founded in the dilapidated building the Confraternita dello Spirito Santo dei Napoletani ("Brotherhood of the Holy Spirit of the Neapolitans"), who bought it from the nuns in 1574. Between 1619 and 1650 a new building was erected, with a project of Ottavio Mascherino and a façade by Cosimo Fanzago. It was dedicated to the Holy Spirit. In the following centuries it was renovated several times, at the beginning of the 18th century by Carlo Fontana and in 1853 the façade was renovated by Antonio Cipolla. It was the National Church of the Kingdom of Naples. The last King of Naples Francis II and his wife Marie Sophie Amalie, Duchess in Bavaria, were buried in the church in 1942. After extensive restoration work carried out in 1986, the church is open for worship.

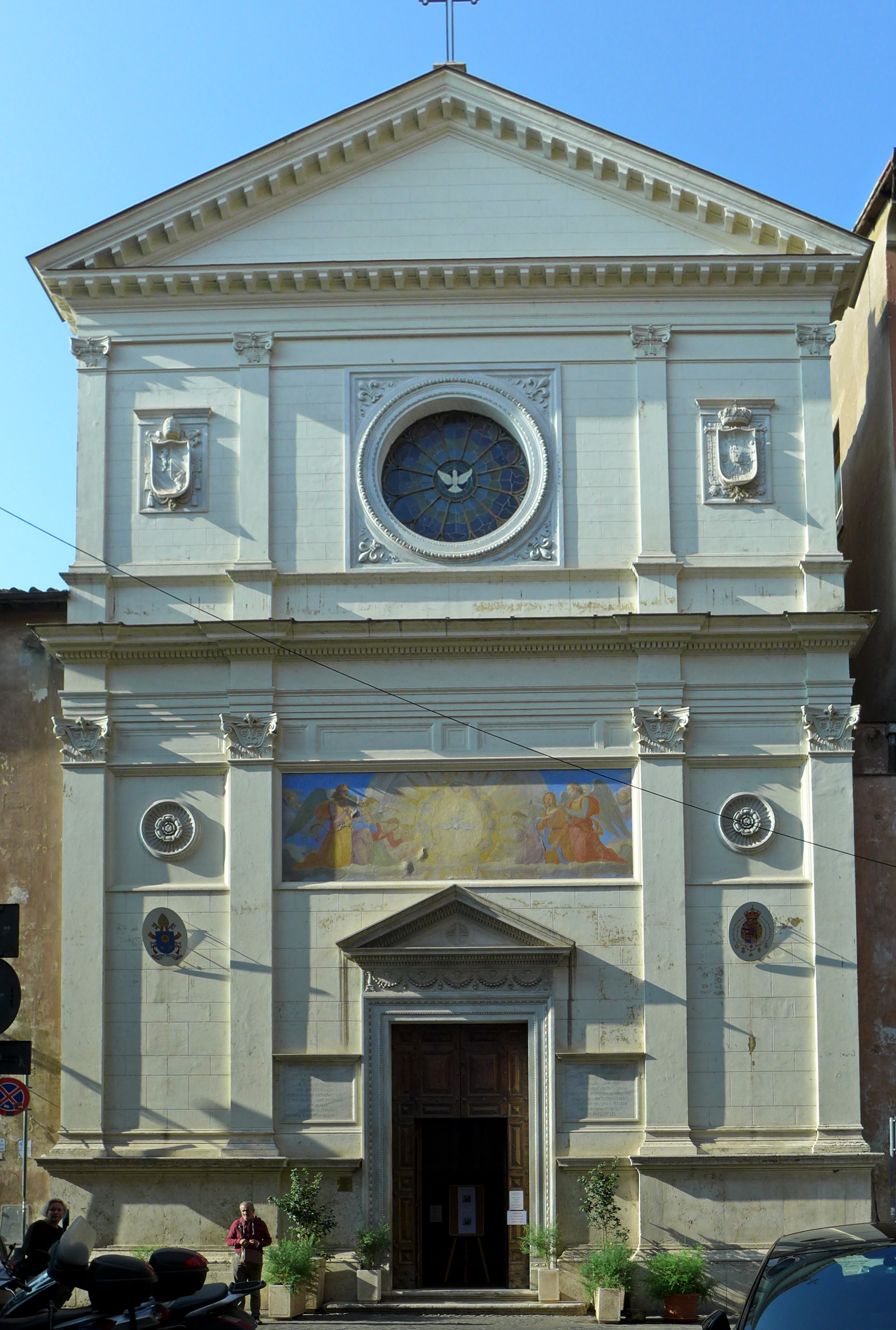
15 Santo Spirito dei Napoletani

=== 16 San Filippo Neri in Via Giulia (Via Giulia 134 bis) ===
Construction of the small church opposite the Carceri Nuove was sponsored by Rutilio Brandi, a glove-maker from Florence, and given to the Compagnia delle santissime piaghe after 1617, the year in which the confraternity got the permission to organize itself. The church was originally dedicated to Saint Trophimus. It was connected to a residence for unmarried girls (zitelle) and a hospital for sick priests. Since the residence was dedicated to San Filippo Neri, after some years the church too changed its dedication to him. In 1728 Filippo Raguzzini restored the church on behalf of Pope Benedict XIII (r. 1724–1730). The church barely escaped destruction in the early 1940s due to the construction of a large road that should have joined Ponte Mazzini and the Chiesa Nuova. This road was never built due to the World War II. The edifice was abandoned after the war before being restored in 2000 for non-religious purposes.

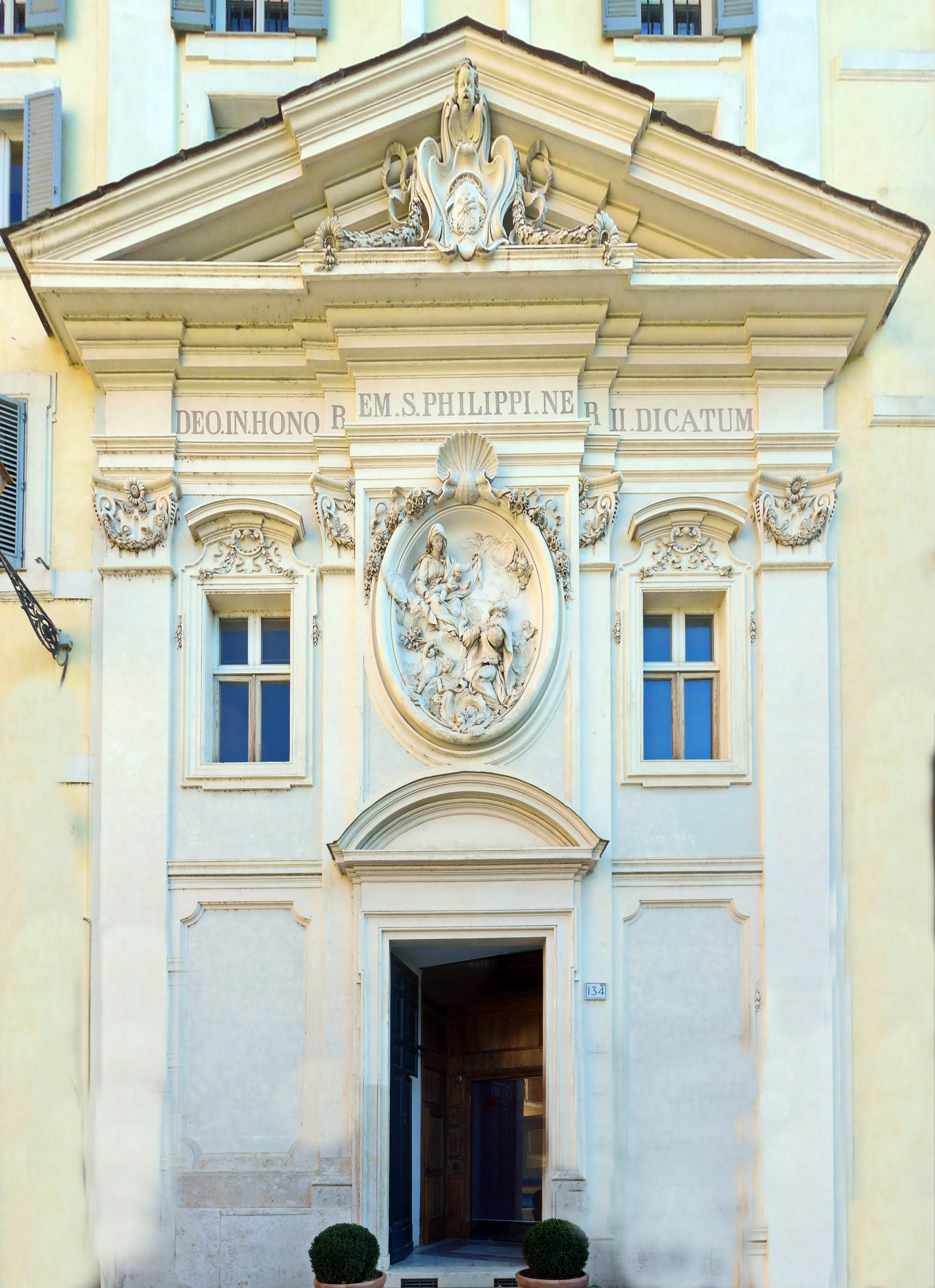
16 San Filippo Neri

=== 17 Carceri Nuove (Via Giulia 52) ===
Since 1430 the Savelli family owned the title of Maresciallo di Santa Romana Chiesa ("Marshall of the Church"), with their own tribunal whose jurisdiction could reach the family of the pontiff. Due to that, the family run the infamous Corte Savella, a prison which lay along Via di Monserrato near the Collegio Inglese. The inhumane penal system in the Corte Savella gave to Pope Innocent X (r. 1644–1655) the excuse to withdraw the Savelli's monopoly on the penal system in Rome.

As a sign of new Justitia Papalis, he had the new penal institution, the Carceri Nuove, built in Via Giulia. This new prison was built between 1652 and 1655 by the architect Antonio del Grande. (Note: Inscription above the portal: IVSTITIAE ET CLEMENTIAE SECVRIORI AC MITlORI REORVM CVSTODIAE NOVVM CARCEREM INNOCENTIVS X PONT. MAX. POSVIT ANNO DOMINI MDCLV (Innocent X. P.M. built the new prison in the year of the Lord 1655, for justice, leniency for the safe and humane custody of convicts)) The Carceri Nuove were considered a model of a humane penitentiary system in their time. The building and its purpose had a rather negative influence on the image of the magnificent street, which led to the suspension of construction in the following years and the Renaissance character of the street being preserved. The building acted as a prison until the opening of Regina Coeli in Trastevere in 1883, further on until 1931 as a youth prison. From 1931 the palace housed the headquarters of the Centro di Studi Penitenziari ("Research Institute for Criminal Justice") and a specialized library. Today the building houses the Direzione Nazionale Antimafia e Antiterrorismo ("National Directorate for Anti-Mafia and Anti-Terrorism").

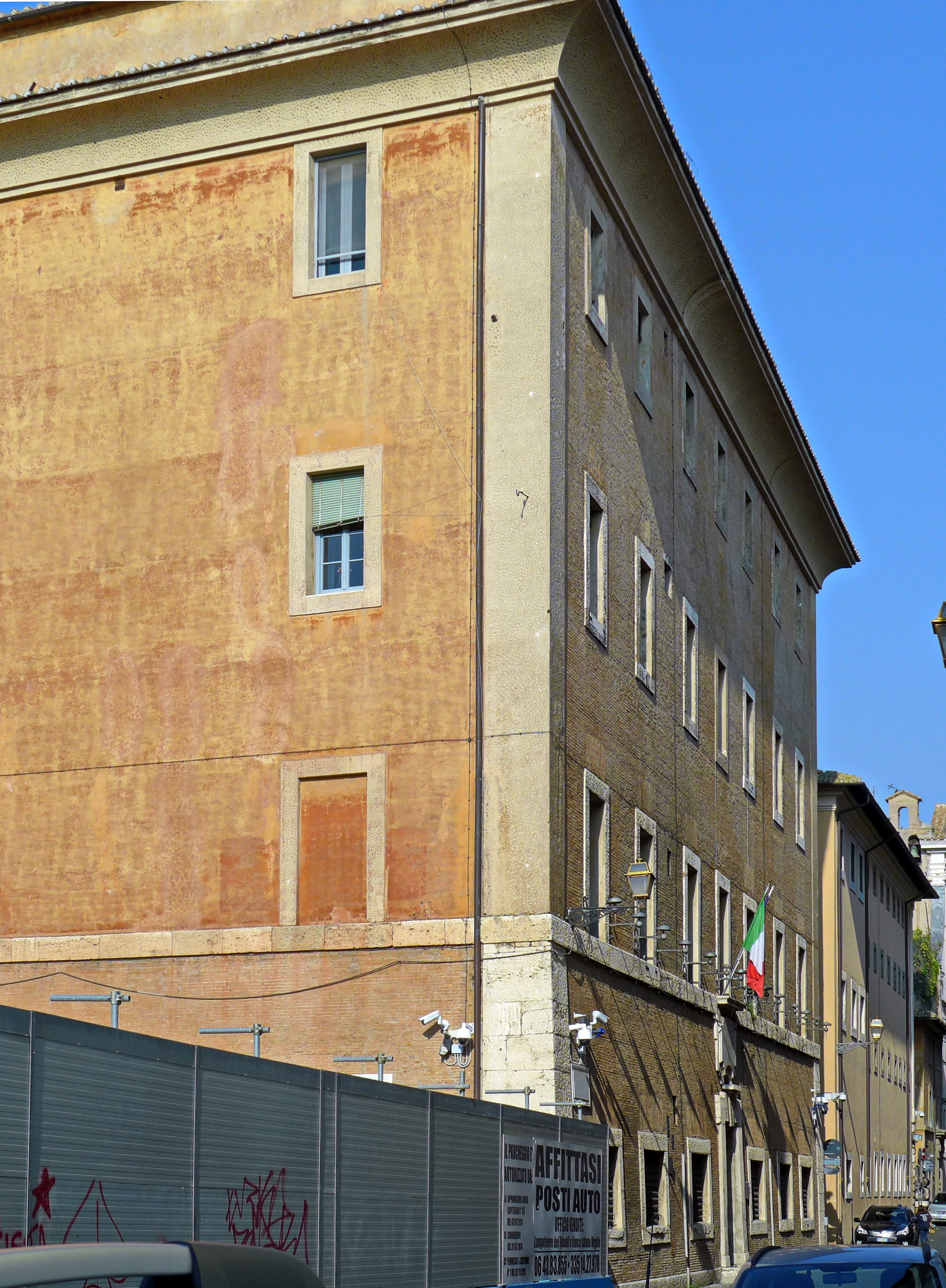
17 Carceri Nuove

=== 17a Palazzo del Gonfalone (Via del Gonfalone 29) ===
The building between the Vicolo della Scimia and Via del Gonfalone has no entrance from Via Giulia. It was built between 1825 and 1827 under Pope Leo XII (r. 1823–1829) according to plans by Giuseppe Valadier as a prison for the youth. Today the building houses the Museo Criminologico (lit. "Criminological Museum").

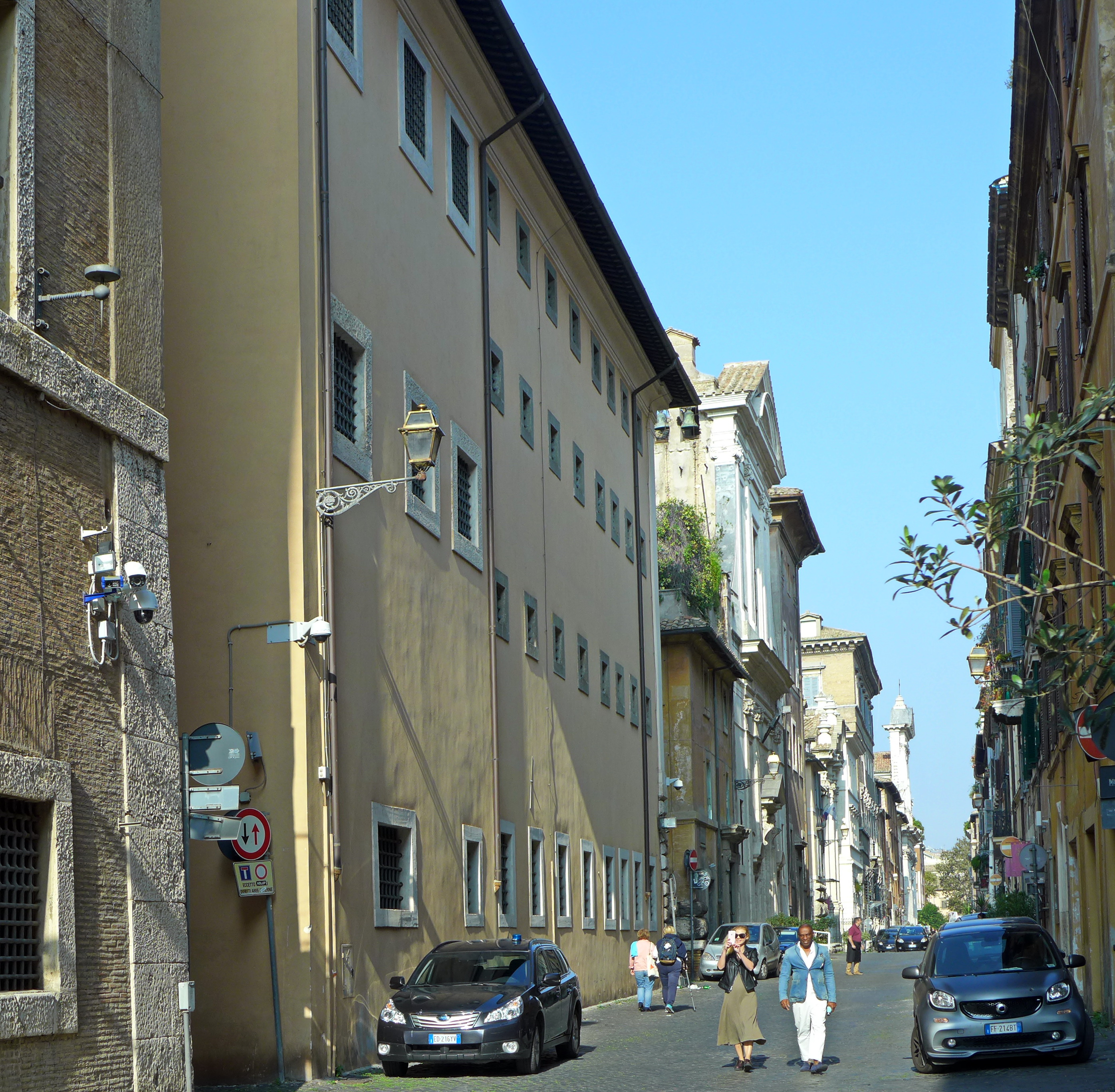
17a Palazzo del Gonfalone

=== 18 Santa Maria del Suffragio (Via Giulia ad. 59) ===
In 1592 the Confraternita del Suffragio ("Brotherhood of Intercession") was founded next to the church of San Biagio della Pagnotta to implore the intercession for the souls of the purgatory. The Brotherhood was approved by Pope Clement VIII (r. 1592–1605) in 1594 and was elevated to the status of Arciconfaternita ("Archbishopric Brotherhood") by Paul V. Thanks to several donations, in 1662 the erection of the church began as a project of architect Carlo Rainaldi. The building was consecrated in 1669, and the façade was finished in 1680. The church's interior was renovated in 1869; the frescoes inside the church are by Cesare Mariani (Coronation of the Virgin) and Giuseppe Bartolomeo Chiari (Nativity of Mary and Adoration of the Magi).

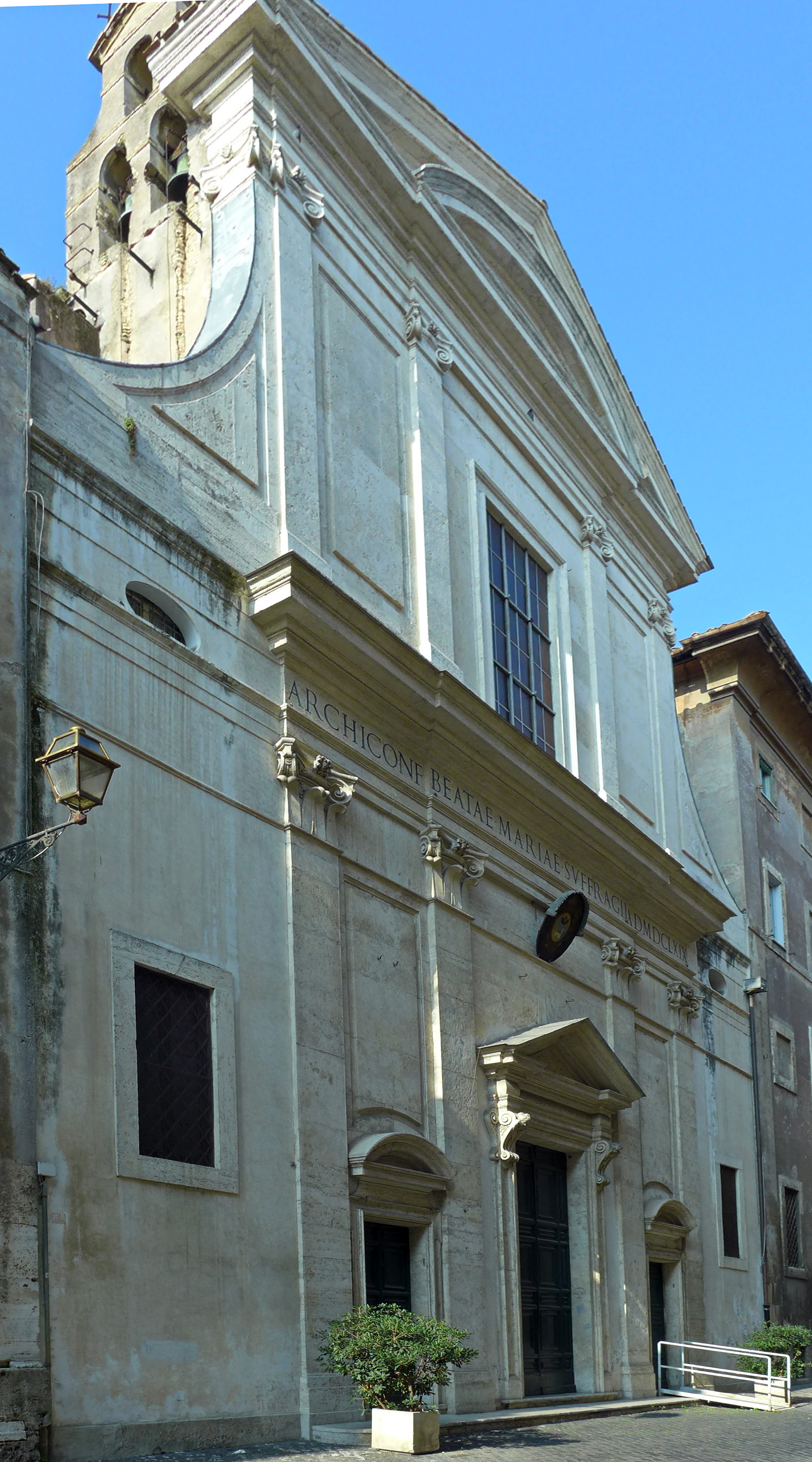
18 Santa Maria del Suffragio

=== 19 Palazzo dei Tribunali ===
Julius II's most important planned project in the new street was a central administration building, in which a large part of the city's important offices and courts ("tribunali") were to be grouped together. The pope's commission to Donato Bramante (at the time main architect of the new St. Peter's Basilica) was issued around 1506, and construction in the area between Vicolo del Cefalo and Via del Gonfalone began before 1508, but was interrupted as in 1511 by the Pax Romana. With Julius II's death in 1513, construction completely stopped. Giorgio Vasari wrote:

Onde Bramante diede principio al palazzo ch'a San Biagio su 'l Tevere si vede, nel quale è ancora un tempio corinzio non finito, cosa molto rara, et il resto del principio di opera rustica bellissimo che è stato gran danno che una sì onorata et utile e magnifica opra non si sia finita, ché da quelli della professione è tenuto il più bello ordine che si sia visto mai in quel genere.

Bramante therefore began the construction of the palace, which can be seen near San Biagio on the Tiber. In it there is still an unfinished Corinthian temple, something very rare and the remains of the beginning in beautiful Opera Rustica. It is a great pity that such an important, useful and great project has remained unfinished. Experts considered it to be the most beautiful building of its kind ever seen.

Some remains of the mighty rusticated walls, called i sofà di Via Giulia (English: Via Giulia's couches) by the Roman population, between Via del Gonfalone and Vicolo del Cefalo along Via Giulia, can be seen today.

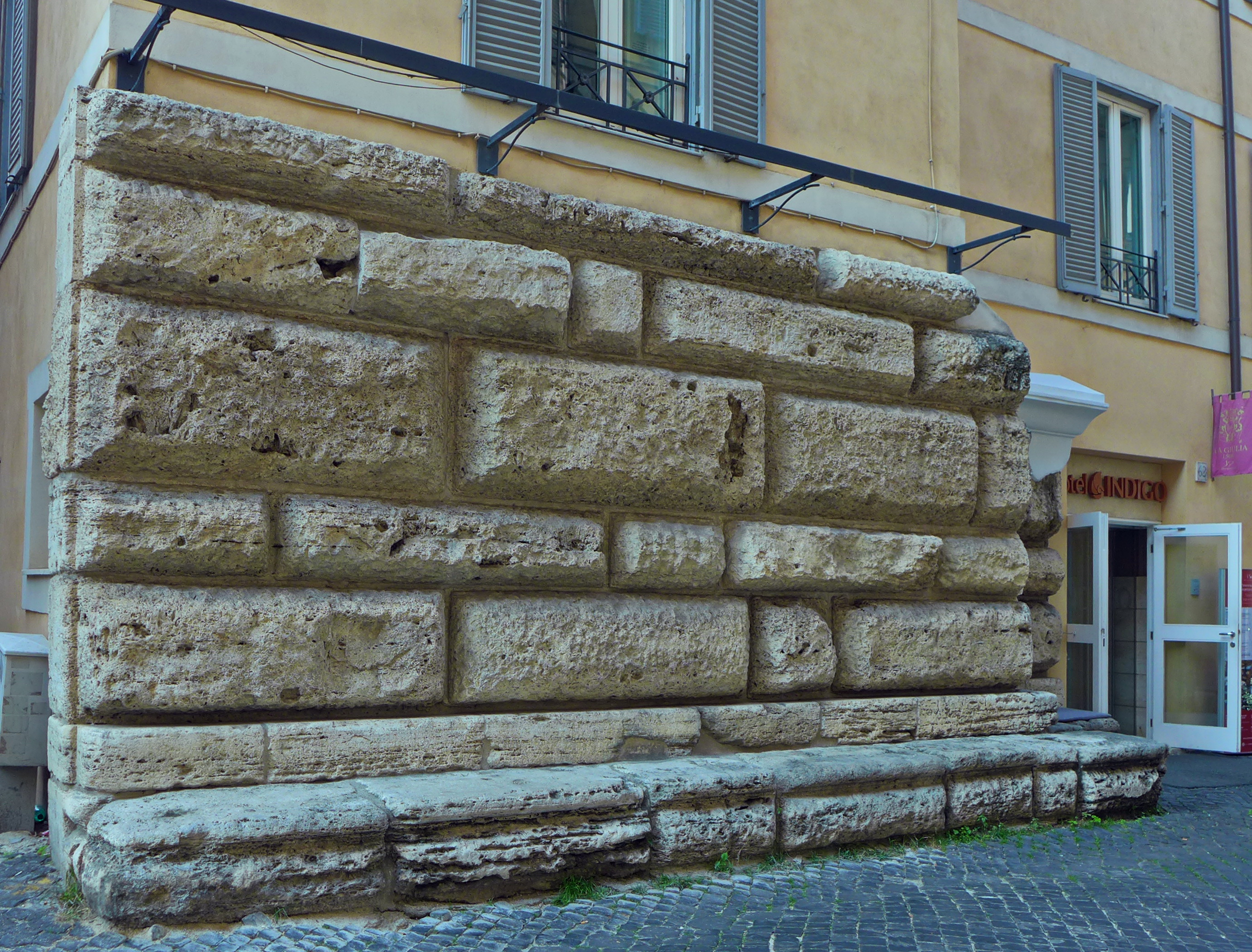
19 Sofà

=== 20 San Biagio della Pagnotta (San Biagio degli Armeni) (Via Giulia ad. 63) ===
This church was dedicated to Saint Blaise of Sebaste and is mentioned in the church catalogues of the Middle Ages under the name of San Biagio de Cantu Secuta. The name "della pagnotta" is derived from the Roman word pagnotta ("bread roll"), which was distributed to the faithful on the 3 February (feast of St. Blaise) and thought to protect against throat illnesses. The church was attached to one of the first abbeys in Rome. An inscription on the interior commemorates the construction of the church by an abbot Dominicus in 1072. According to the Bramante's plans, this church was to be included in the yard of the Palazzo dei Tribunali. From 1539 to 1835 it was a parish church. In 1826 Pope Gregory XVI (r. 1831–1846) assigned the church to the Armenian community of Santa Maria Egiziaca. Since then it has been called officially San Biagio degli Armeni.

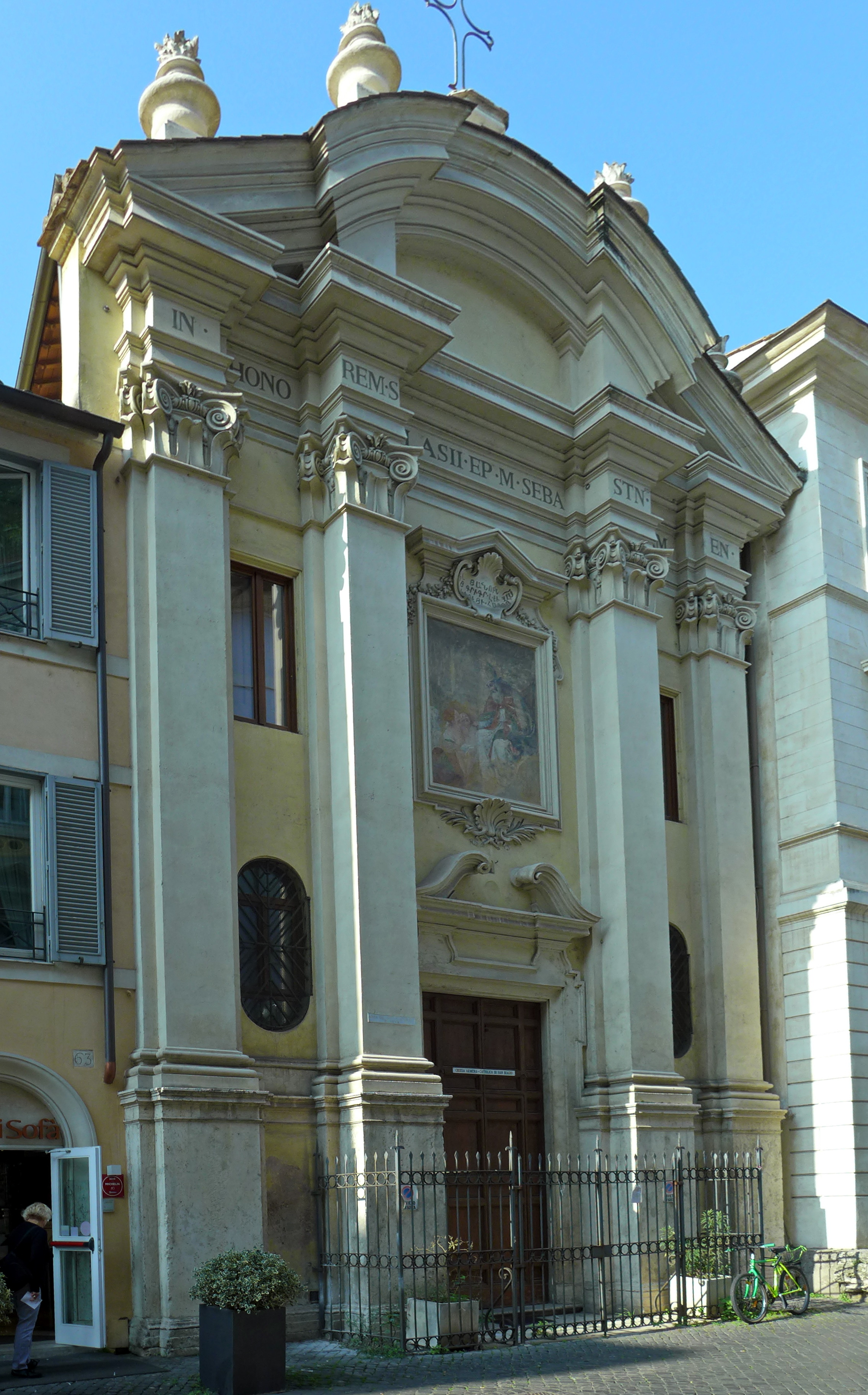
20 San Biagio della Pagnotta

=== 21 Palazzo Ricci-Donarelli (Via Giulia no. 99-105) ===
The palace is opposite to the Palazzo Sacchetti and was originally a group of residential buildings that first belonged to the Ricci and later to the Donarelli family. The complex was restructured in 1663, possibly by Carlo Rainaldi.

=== 22 Palazzo Sacchetti (Via Giulia 66) ===
Antonio da Sangallo the Younger built the palace on land bought in 1542 by the Vatican Chapter. The façade still bears the chipped coat of arms of Paul III. His son Orazio inherited the building and sold it in 1552 to Cardinal Giovanni Ricci di Montepulciano, who had the palace extended to its current dimensions by the architect Nanni di Baccio Bigio. An inscription (Note: Inscription on the façade: DOMVS/ANTONII/SANGALLI/ARCHITECTI/MDLIII (house of the architect Antonio Sangallo 1553)) in the Vicolo del Cefalo's side wall states that the palace was exempted from paying the census tax in 1555. (Note: Census inscription on the façade) The building changed hands several times. In 1649 it was bought by the Florentine Sacchetti family, whose name it still bears. The entrance to Via Giulia is made of marble and flanked on both sides by three large windows with grilles, thresholds, and cornices. In the left corner of the palazzo there is a small fountain (Note: Fountain along the palazzo) flanked by caryatides with two dolphins embedded in the wall; this refers to the later owners, the Ceuli family, whose coat of arms was chipped. Notable features inside include the Salone dei Mappamondi ("Hall of World Maps"), designed by Francesco Salviati, and the dining room with two frescoes painted by Pietro da Cortona. The writer Ingeborg Bachmann lived in this palazzo in 1973 dying at Sant'Eugenio Hospital on 17 October 1973.

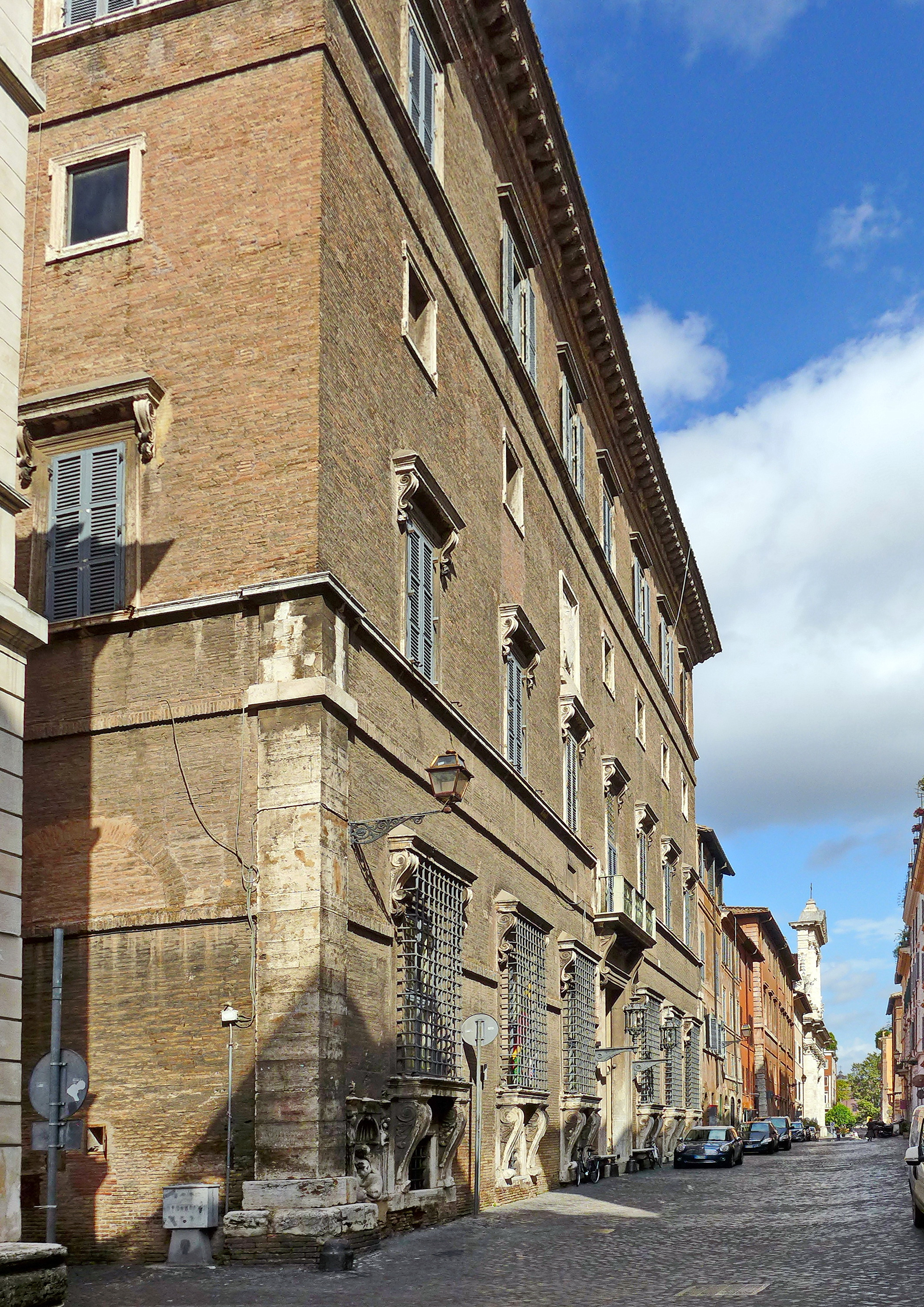
22 Palazzo Sacchetti

=== 23 Palace with the Farnese coats of arms (Via Giulia 93) ===
The building's first owner could have been Durante Duranti, lover of Costanza Farnese, or Guglielmo della Porta, which in this case would have been also the architect. The palazzo takes its name from the three coats of arms of the Farnese family, which were added to the façade under Paul III. In the centre of the upper floor there is the coat of arms of Paul III with the papal tiara and the keys between two unicorns. On the left is the coat of arms of Cardinal Alessandro Farnese and on the right the coat of arms of his brother Ottavio Farnese or of Pierluigi Farnese, both Dukes of Parma and Piacenza.

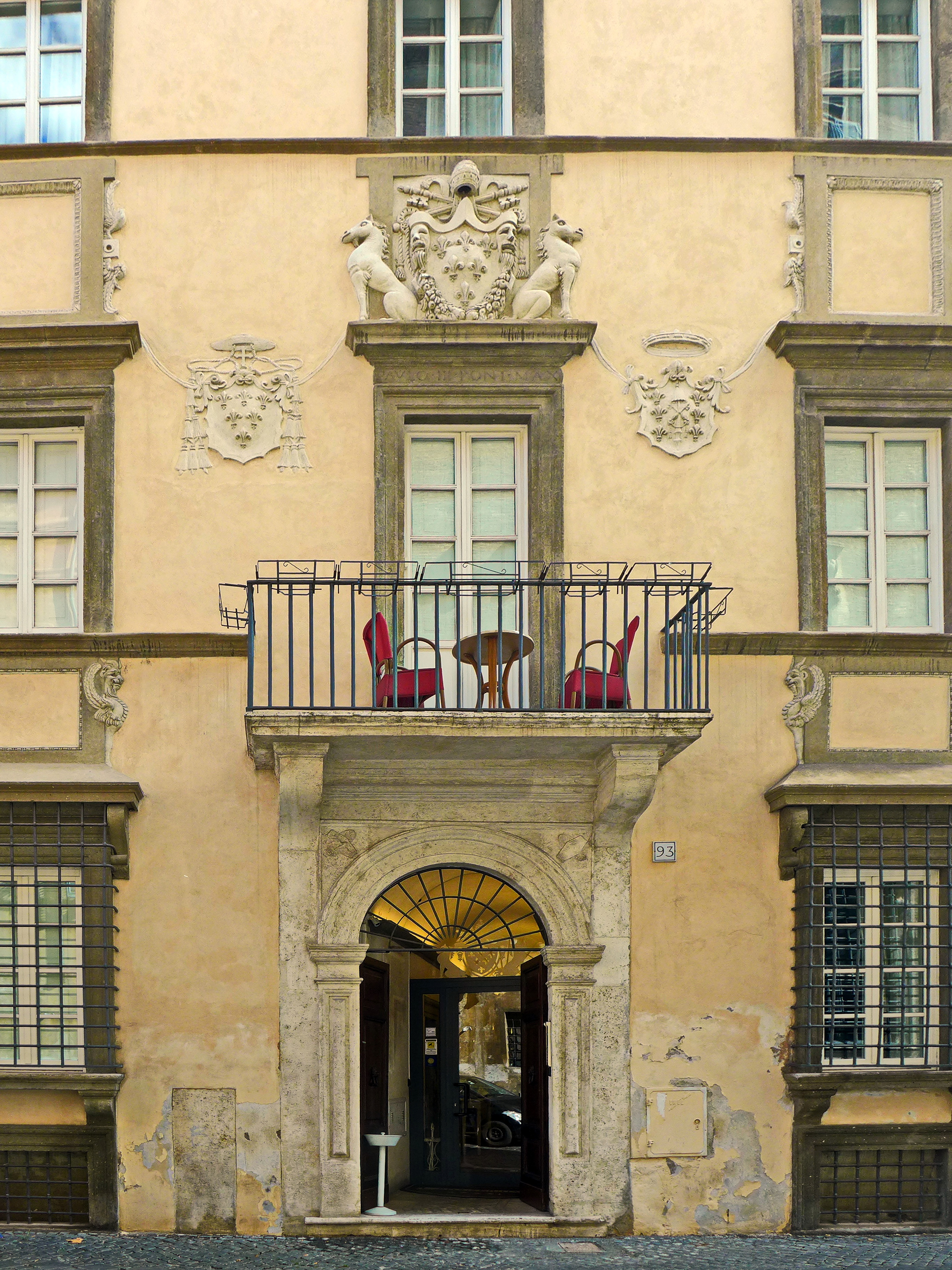
23 Palazzo with the Farnese coats of arms

=== 24 Palazzo Medici Clarelli (Via Giulia 79) ===
Antonio da Sangallo the Younger built this palace as a private residence around 1535–1536. After Sangallo's death in 1546 the building was owned by the Florentine Migliore Cresci. An inscription above the main portal (Note: Inscription above the portal) immortalizes Duke Cosimo I de' Medici. The palace for some time belonged to the Tuscan Consulate in Rome. At the end of the 17th century, it was acquired by the Marini Clarelli family. In the 19th century it was used as barracks before being sold to the city of Rome in 1870. The façade (richly historiated at the time of Cresci) and the portal are lined with rusticated ashlars. On the sides of the portal there are badly rebuilt large windows on consoles.

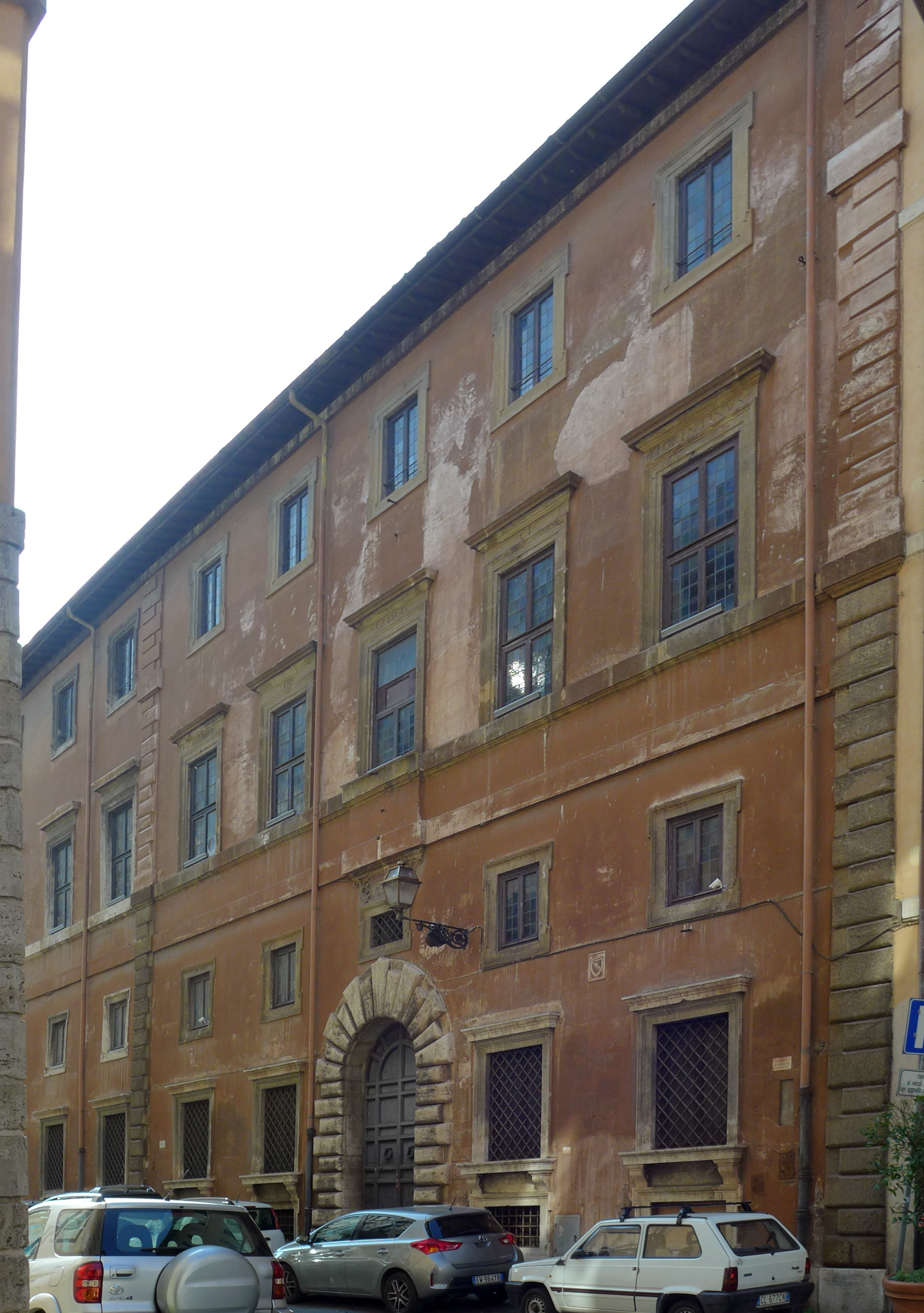
24 Palazzo Medici Clarelli

=== 25 Casa di Raffaello (Via Giulia 85) ===
This palace, erroneously called the House of Raphael, was built after 1525 for the Vatican Chapter according to a design by the architect Bartolomeo de Ramponibus. Raphael originally acquired several plots of land here. However, he died before the building's construction began. The original and the definitive design – known through three plans discovered in the Uffizi – are respectively by Raphael and Antonio da Sangallo the Younger. An inscription above the windows of the first floor is dedicated to Raphael: "POSSEDEVA RAF SANZIO NEL MDXX" (English: Raf(faello) Sanzio owned (this house) in 1520).

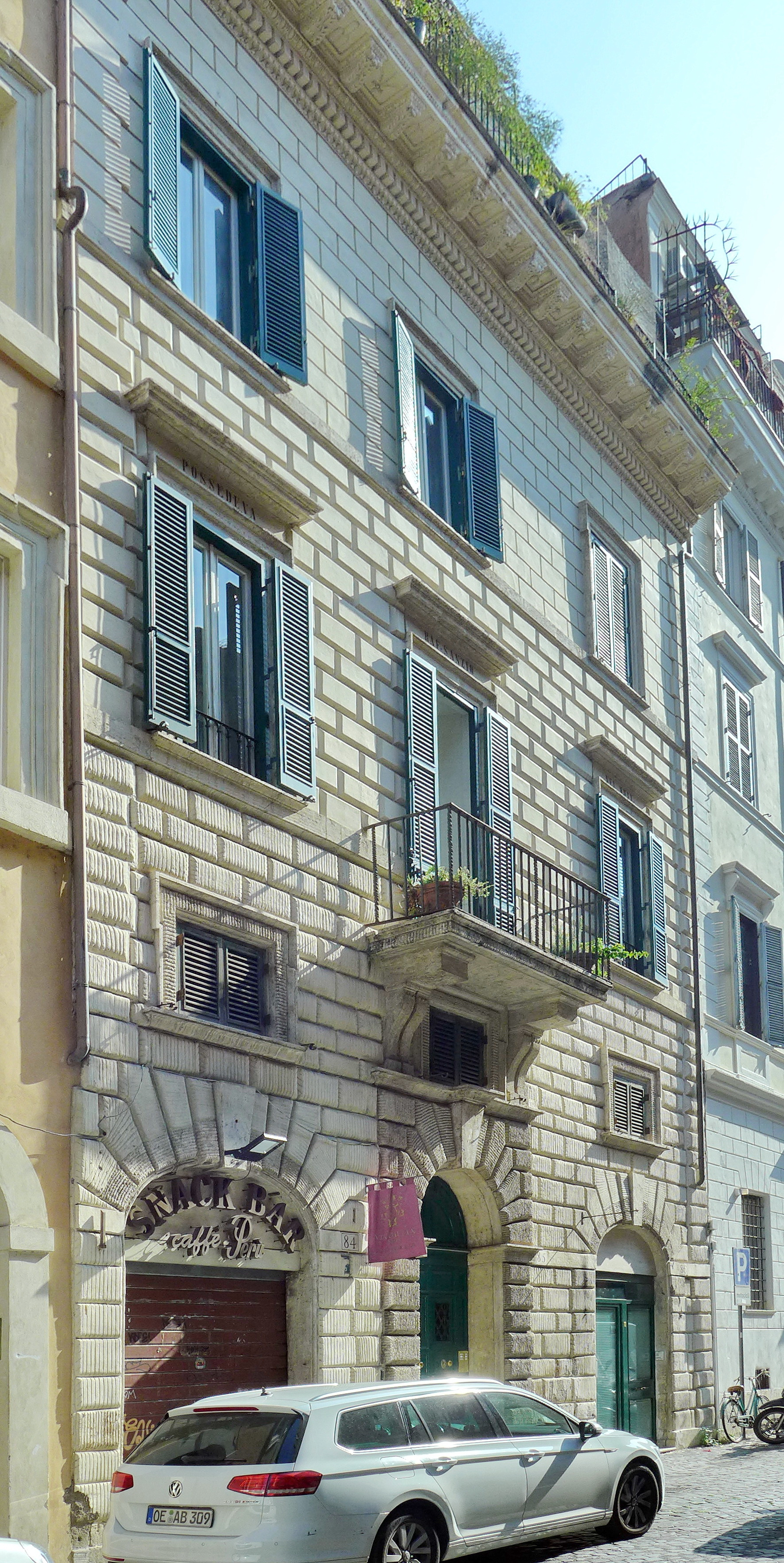
25 Casa di Raffaello

=== 26 Quarter of the Florentines ===
In 1448 Florentine merchants who resided in Rome (many of them settled in the Tiber bend, today's Ponte rione), founded the Compagnia della Pietà, akin to the Florentine "Misericordia". Both popes from the Medici family, Leo X and Clement VII (r. 1523–1534), promoted the influx of Florentines. Since 1515 the Republic of Florence had its own consulate in a palace on Via del Consolato that was erected in 1541 and demolished in 1888 to open the Corso Vittorio Emanuele avenue. It had its own court and its own prison. Some of the buildings erected towards the end of the 15th century that once belonged to Florentines (Note: Tabella di proprietà (ownership table) on one of the houses) are still preserved across from the church of San Giovanni dei Fiorentini:

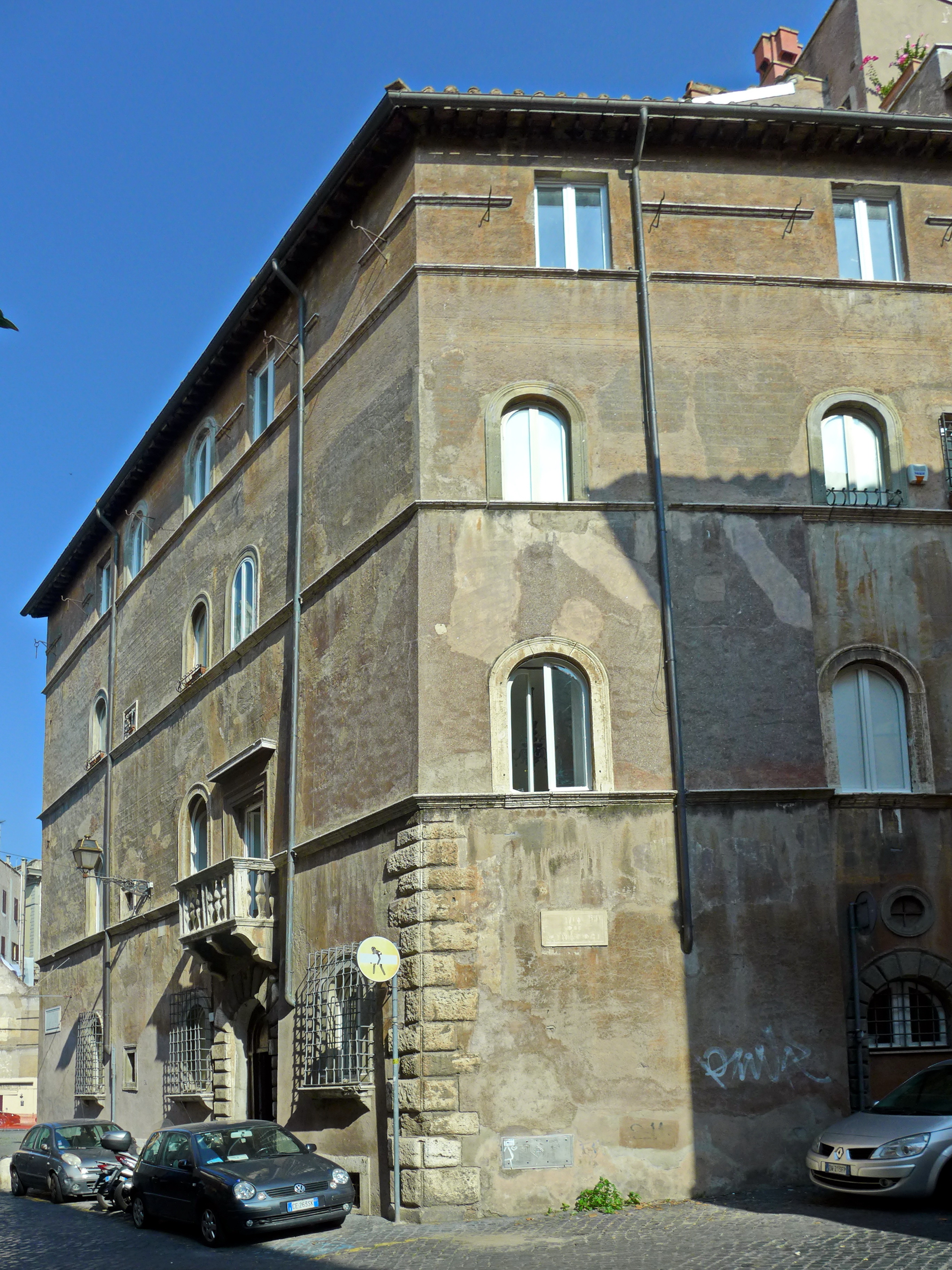
Quarter of the Florentines

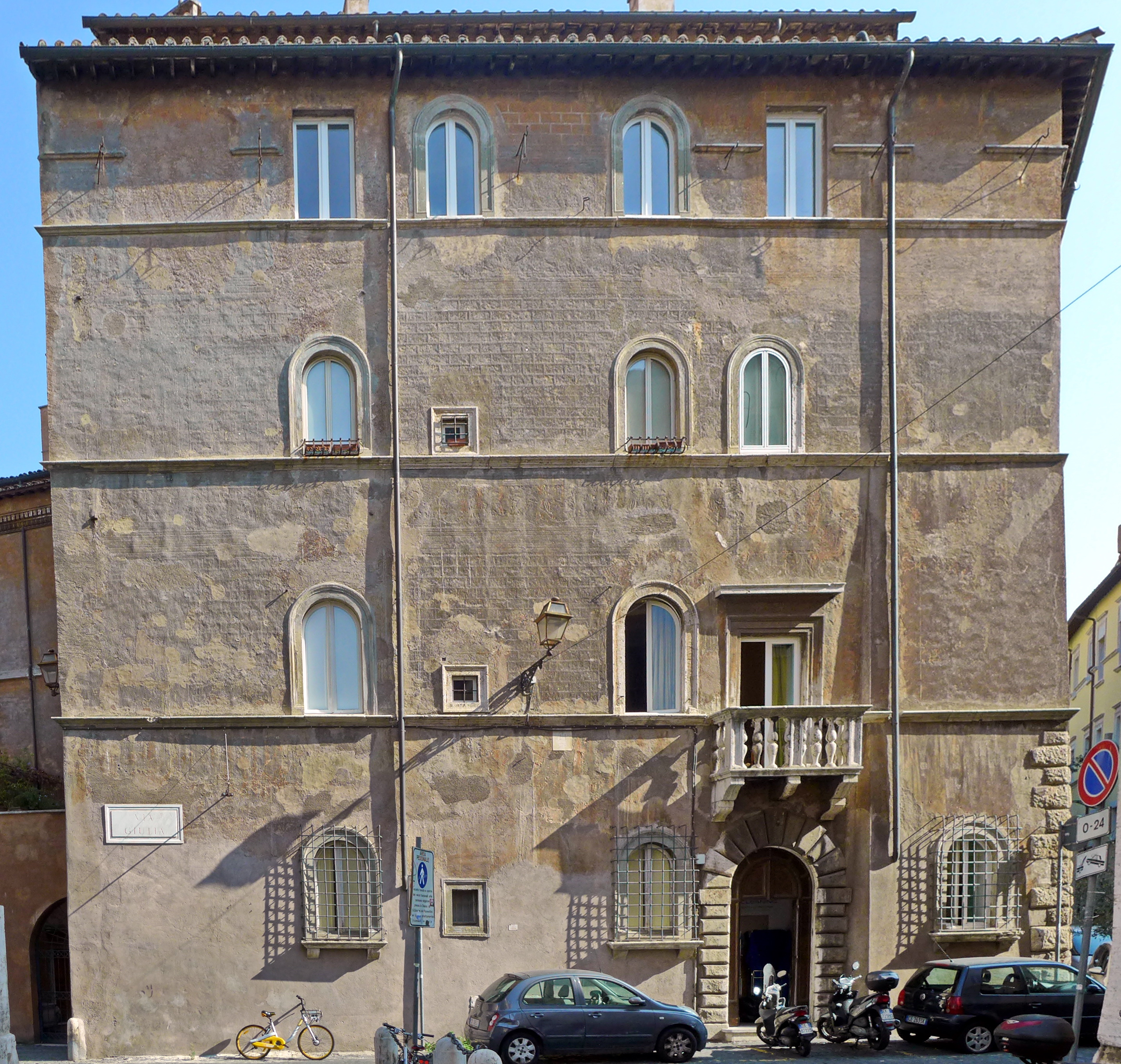
Quarter of the Florentines

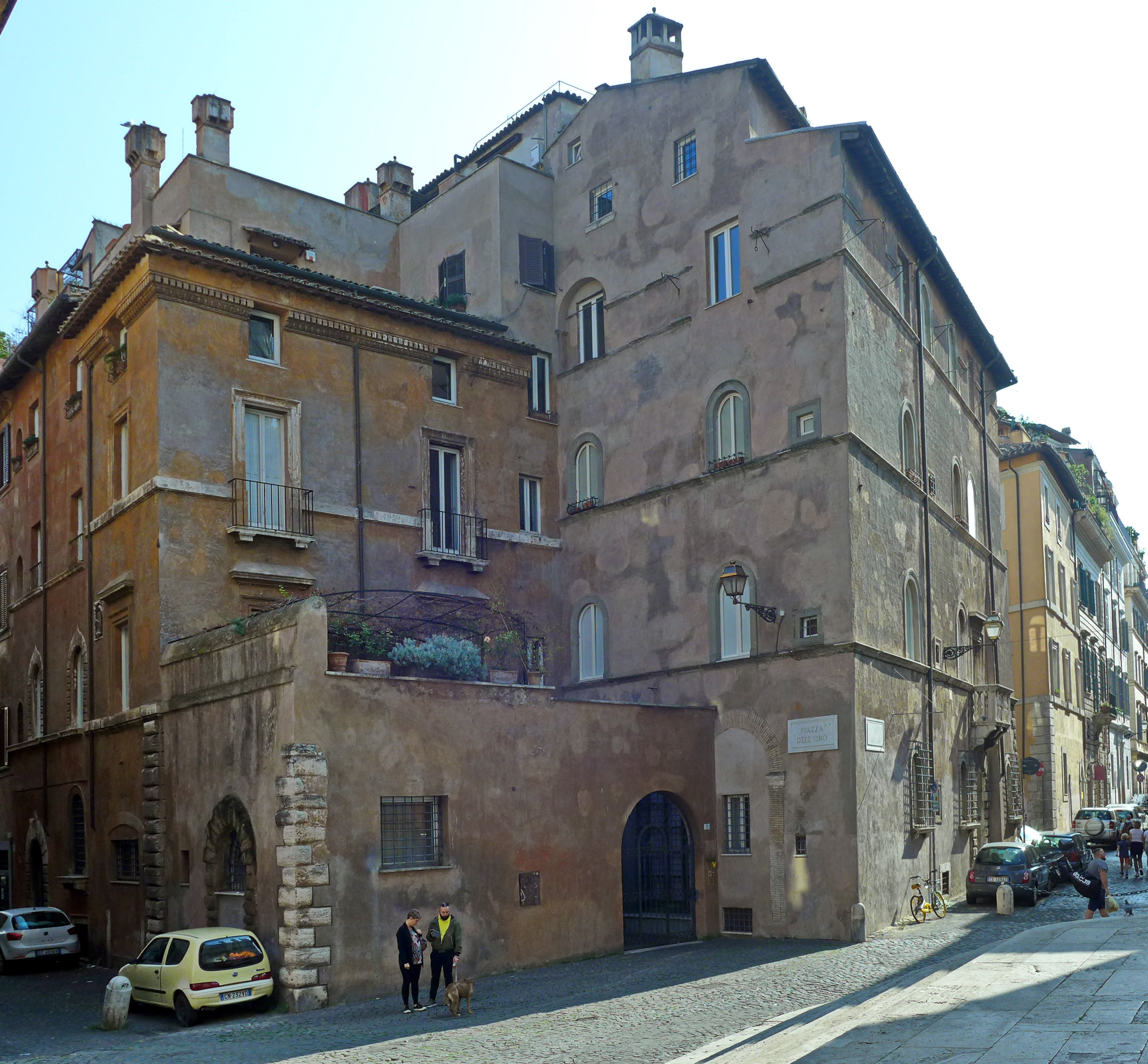
Quarter of the Florentines

=== 27 San Giovanni dei Fiorentini (Via Acciaioli 2) ===
In 1519 the "nation" of the Florentines received from Leo X the privilege to build a parish church in honour of John the Baptist. The church stands at the northern end of Via Giulia in the Florentine quarter. The church reflects the grandeur and the political self-image of the Medici family, whose portraits adorned the facade of a palazzo right next to the church. It is the largest church on Via Giulia and its construction, started at the beginning of the 16th century, lasted more than 200 years. It combined the efforts of three of Rome's master builders: Giacomo della Porta, Carlo Maderno, and Francesco Borromini. The last two artists were interred in the same tomb at the church. The altarpiece, started by Pietro da Cortona, was continued by Borromini and finished by Ciro Ferri.

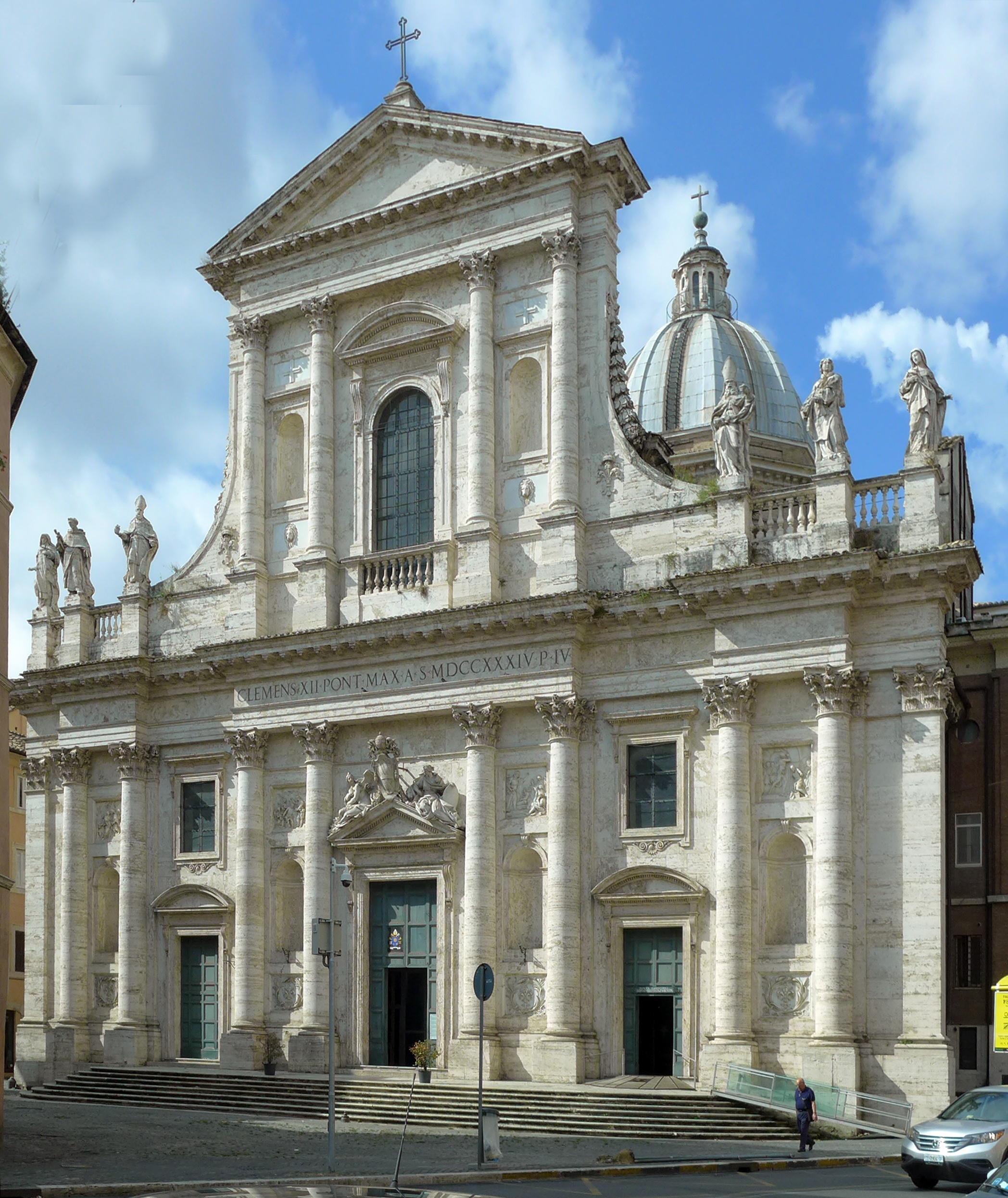
San Giovanni dei Fiorentini

== Sources ==
- Vasari, Giorgio (1568). Le vite de' più eccellenti architetti, pittori, et scultori italiani, da Cimabue insino a' tempi nostri (in Italian). Firenze: Giunti.
- Gigli, Giacinto (1958) [1670]. Diario romano, 1608-1670 (in Italian). Roma: Staderini.
- Infessura, Stefano (1890) [1494]. Oreste Tommasini (ed.). Diario della città di Roma (in Italian). Roma: Forzani e C.
- Armellini, Mariano (1891). Le chiese di Roma dal secolo IV al XIX (in Italian).
- Bertarelli, Luigi Vittorio (1925). Roma e dintorni (in Italian). Milano: Touring Club Italiano.
- Callari, Luigi (1932). I Palazzi di Roma (in Italian). Roma: Ugo Sofia-Moretti.
- Ceccarelli, Giuseppe ("Ceccarius") (1940). Strada Giulia (in Italian). Roma: Danesi.
- Castagnoli, Ferdinando; Cecchelli, Carlo; Giovannoni, Gustavo; Zocca, Mario (1958). Topografia e urbanistica di Roma (in Italian). Bologna: Cappelli.
- Portoghesi, Paolo (1970). Roma del Rinascimento (in Italian). Milano: Electa.
- Buchowiecki, Walter (1967). Handbuch der Kirchen Roms (in German). Vol. 1. Wien: Verlag Brüder Hollinek.
- Bruschi, Arnaldo (1971). "Donato Bramante". Dizionario Biografico degli Italiani (in Italian). Vol. 13. Istituto dell'Enciclopedia Italiana.
- Salerno, Luigi; Spezzaferro, Luigi; Tafuri, Manfredo (1973). Via Giulia: una utopia urbanistica del 500 (in Italian). Roma: Staderini.
- Pietrangeli, Carlo (1979). Guide rionali di Roma (in Italian). Vol. Regola (III) (2 ed.). Roma: Fratelli Palombi Editori.
- Dante, Francesco (1980). "Agostino Chigi". Dizionario Biografico degli Italiani (in Italian). Vol. 24. Istituto dell'Enciclopedia Italiana.
- Pietrangeli, Carlo (1981). Guide rionali di Roma (in Italian). Vol. Ponte (IV) (3 ed.). Roma: Fratelli Palombi Editori.
- Delli, Sergio (1988). Le strade di Roma (in Italian). Roma: Newton & Compton.
- Brentano, Carrol (1989). "Guglielmo Della Porta". Dizionario Biografico degli Italiani (in Italian). Vol. 37. Istituto dell'Enciclopedia Italiana.
- Rowland, Ingrid D. (1998). The Culture of the High Renaissance. Ancients and Moderns in Sixteenth-Century Rome. Cambridge: Cambridge University Press.
- Visceglia, Maria Antonietta (2–4 April 2003). Identità urbana, rituali civici e spazio pubblico a Roma tra Rinascimento e Controriforma. Urbs: Concepts and realities of public space / Concetti e realtà dello spazio pubblico (in Italian). Istituto Olandese di Roma, Roma: Università degli Studi di Roma "La Sapienza". Archived from the original on 31 January 2021.
- Venditti, Antonio (May 2003). "L'arco di Via Giulia, un palco sul carnevale". Specchio Romano (in Italian).
- Witte, Arnold A. (2007). "The Artful Hermitage: The Palazzetto Farnese as a Counter-reformation 'diaeta'". Rome: "L'Erma" di Bretschneider.
- Temple, Nicholas (2011). Renovatio Urbis; Architecture, urbanism and ceremony in the Rome of Julius II. New York: Routledge. ISBN 978-0-203-81848-0.
- Mazzotta, Bartolomeo (2014). AA. VV. (ed.). Dall'archivio Cederna: le chiese distrutte a Roma durante il ventennio fascista (1922-1943) (in Italian). Roma: Gangemi. ISBN 978-88-492-2958-5.
