= Lungotevere degli Alberteschi =

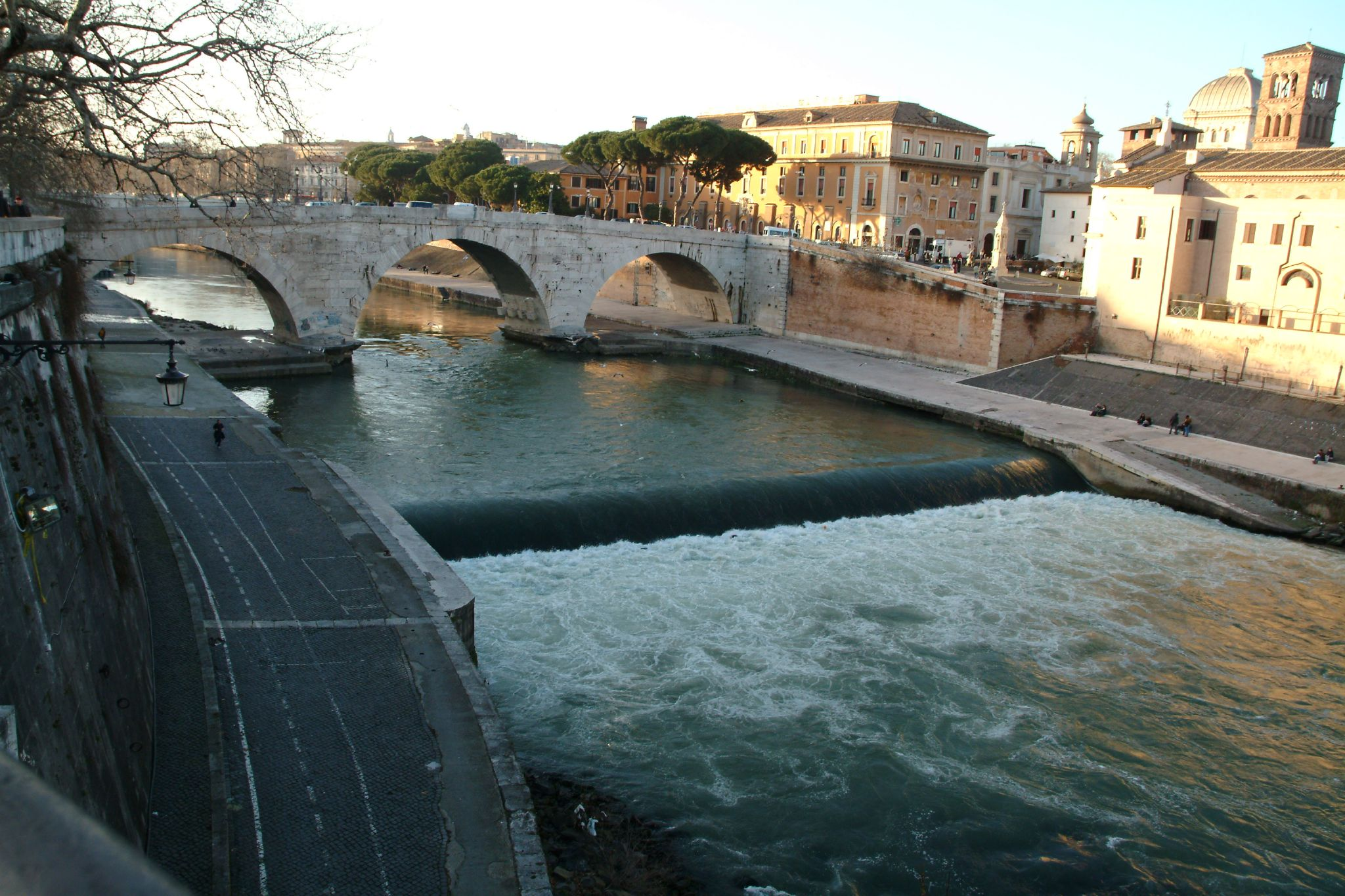
- Ponte Cestio as seen from Lungotevere degli Alberteschi
- Interactive map of Lungotevere degli Alberteschi
- Native name: Lungotevere degli Alberteschi (Italian)
- Namesake: House of Alberteschi
- Type: Lungotevere
- Location: Trastevere, Rome, Italy
- From: Piazza Castellani
- To: Lungotevere degli Anguillara

Lungotevere degli Alberteschi is the stretch of Lungotevere that links Piazza Castellani to Lungotevere degli Anguillara in Rome (Italy, in the Rione Trastevere.

The Lungotevere takes its name from the powerful House of Alberteschi, that had erected its towers in the area, between Ponte Santa Maria and Ponte Quattro Capi.

The Alberteschi Tower, the last one of the noble house, rose nearly in front of Ponte Rotto, close to the former family residence: it was demolished at the end of the 19th century, during the construction of the Lungotevere.

== Bibliography ==
- Rendina, Claudio; Paradisi, Donatella (2004). Le strade di Roma. 1st Volume A-D. Rome: Newton Compton Editori. ISBN 88-541-0208-3.
