= San Gregorio della Divina Pietà =

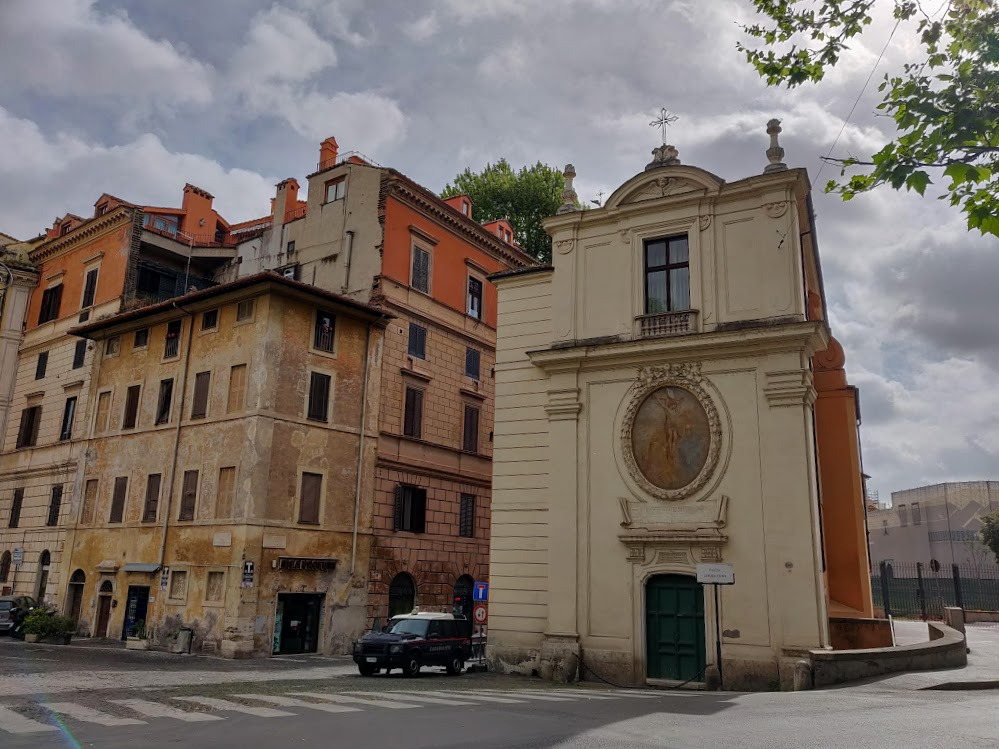
- Façade viewed
- Click on the map for a fullscreen view
- 41.8914°N 12.4788°E
- Location: Rome
- Country: Italy
- Denomination: Roman Catholic

Architecture
- Architect: Filippo Barigioni
- Architectural type: Church
- Style: Baroque
- Completed: 1729

San Gregorio della Divina Pietà is a small Roman Catholic church facing the Piazza Gerusalemme located in Rione Sant'Angelo, in Rome, Italy. It is located near the Great Synagogue of Rome and the former Jewish quarter of Rome. It is sometimes referred to as San Gregorietto due to its small size. In the past, it was also called San Gregorio a Ponte Quattro Capi or Pons Judaeorum due to its proximity to the bridge known now as Pons Fabricius, connecting the sector to the Tiber Island.

== History and art ==
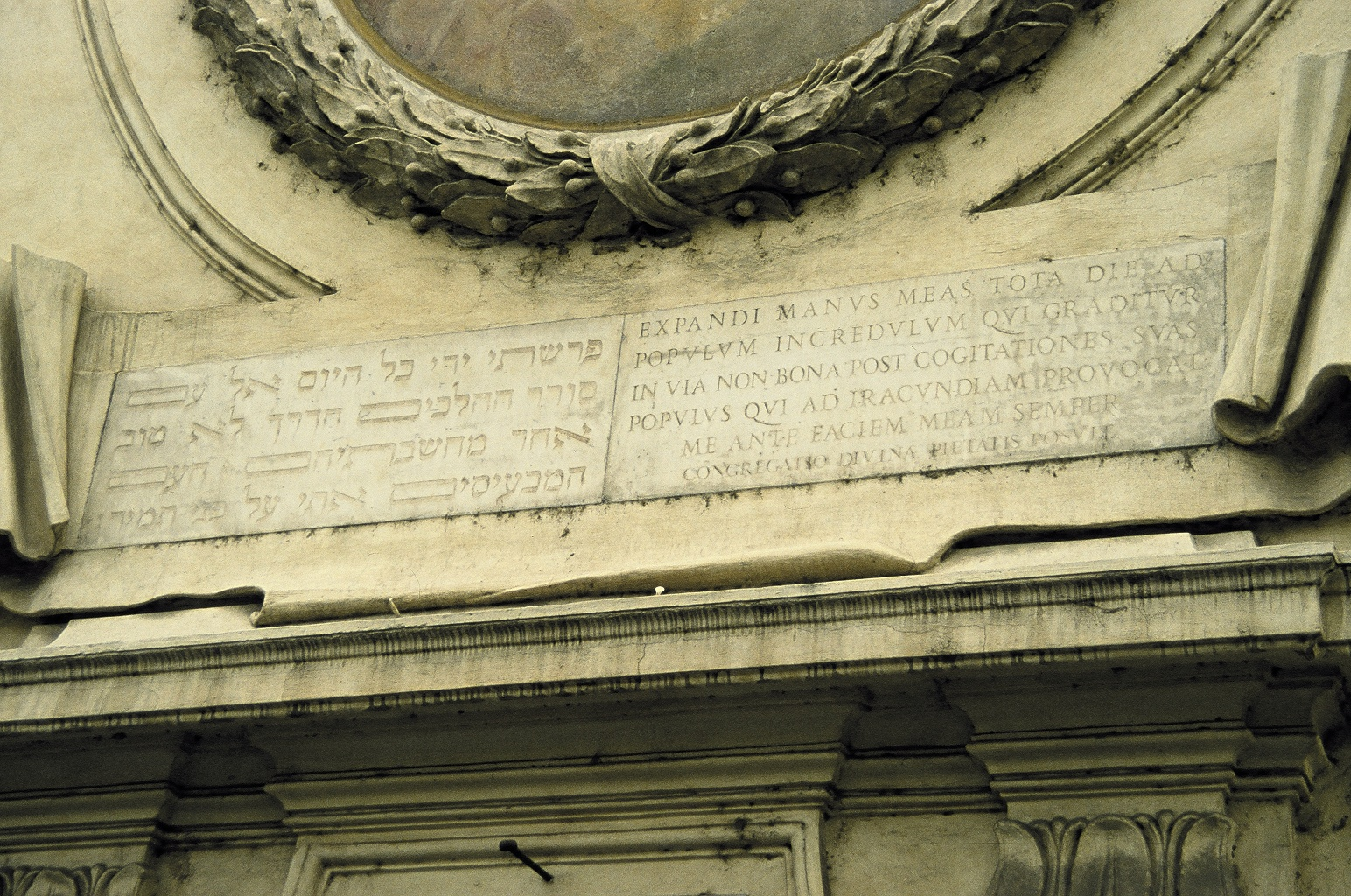
Hebrew and Latin inscription above the portal of the church from Isaiah 65:2–3

A shrine at the site is likely very ancient, although the first documentation of a church of this name dates to the twelfth century. It was built over the houses of the gens Anicia, and later dedicated to Pope Gregory the Great, because of the tradition that the saint was born here.

San Gregorio was declared a parish church and remained so until 1729, although in the 16th century it lost almost all its territory due to the establishment of the nearby Ghetto. In 1729 the rectangular building was restored by Filippo Barigioni on behalf of Pope Benedict XIII, and given to the Congregation of the Operai della Divina Pietà (Workers of the Divine Mercy), founded in 1679 to help families once well off which had fallen into poverty—its modern appellation comes from that. Low on the external north wall is an 18th-century alms slot with an Italian inscription reading "Alms for poor, honorable and ashamed families". A few yards away is another slot inscribed "MEMORIALI", used to give the priests the names of the persons or families in difficulty.

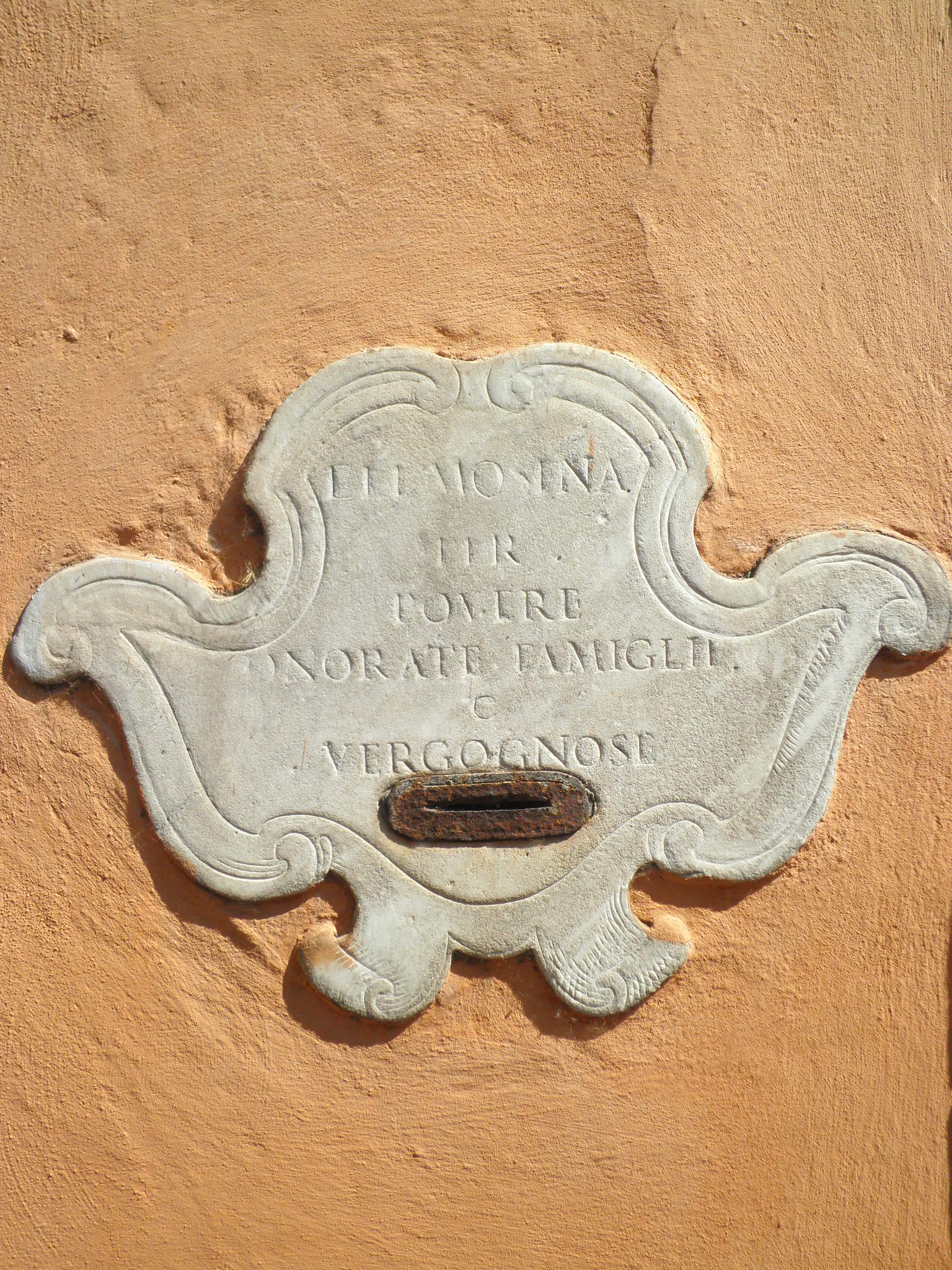
Alms slot on the north wall

The church belonged originally to the rione Ripa, but after the demolitions around the Theater of Marcellus between 1926 and 1930, it was assigned to the rione Sant'Angelo. Until 1870, the pope required the Jews living in the nearby ghetto to attend compulsory sermons (Italian: prediche coatte) every sabbath in front of the church, which faced two gates of the Jewish quarter, but they avoided hearing them by putting wax in their ears. Because of this, during a restoration in 1858, a bilingual (Hebrew and Latin) inscription with a passage from the Old Testament Book of Isaiah (Isaiah 65:2–3), in which the Lord complains about the obstinacy of the Jews, was put on the facade.

The facade by Barigioni is decorated with Étienne Parrocel's painting of the Crucifixion, framed in an oval. The interior is rectangular with one nave: painted on the vault, the Assunzione di Maria of Giuseppe Sereni; on the main altar, the Madonna della divina pietà of Gilles Hallet. Andrea Casali painted on the altar to the right a St Philip Neri in ecstasy and two ovals representing Franciscan saints.

== Sources ==
- Delli, Sergio (1975). Le strade di Roma (in Italian). Newton Compton, Roma.
- Pietrangeli, Carlo (1976). Sant'Angelo. Guide rionali di Roma (in Italian). Fratelli Palombi, Roma.
