= Lungotevere degli Anguillara =

Street in Rome, Italy

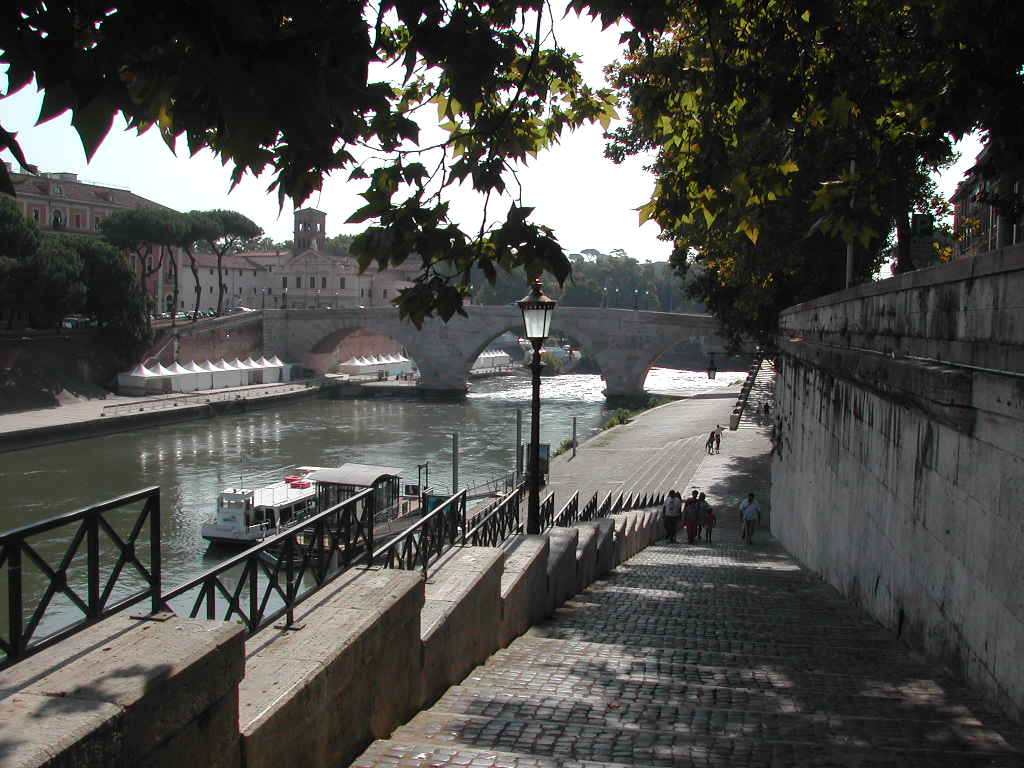
A boat-boarding area on Lungotevere degli Anguillara; in the background, Ponte Cestio and the Tiber Island

Lungotevere degli Anguillara is the stretch of Lungotevere that links Piazza Giuseppe Gioachino Belli to Lungotevere degli Alberteschi in Rome (Italy), in the Rione Trastevere.

The Lungotevere takes its name from the powerful House of Anguillara (lords in Rome until the end of 15th century), that owned a palace and a tower in the area.

Until 1886 the name of the Lungotevere was Cestio, due to its vicinity to Ponte Cestio, that links the Lungotevere to Tiber Island.

== Bibliography ==
- Rendina, Claudio; Paradisi, Donatella (2004). Le strade di Roma. 1st Volume A-D. Rome: Newton Compton Editori. ISBN 88-541-0208-3.
