= Naumachia of Augustus =

Roman basin

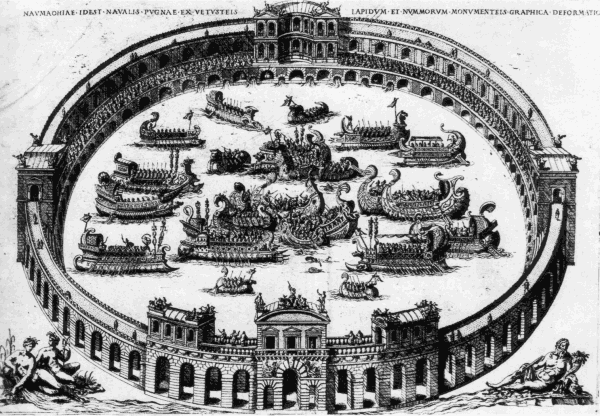
- Depiction of a naumachia.
- Interactive map of the Naumachia of Augustus area

General information
- Type: Naumachia
- Location: 14 regions of Augustan Rome, Trastevere
- Coordinates: 41°53′12″N 12°28′15″E
- Construction started: 2 BC

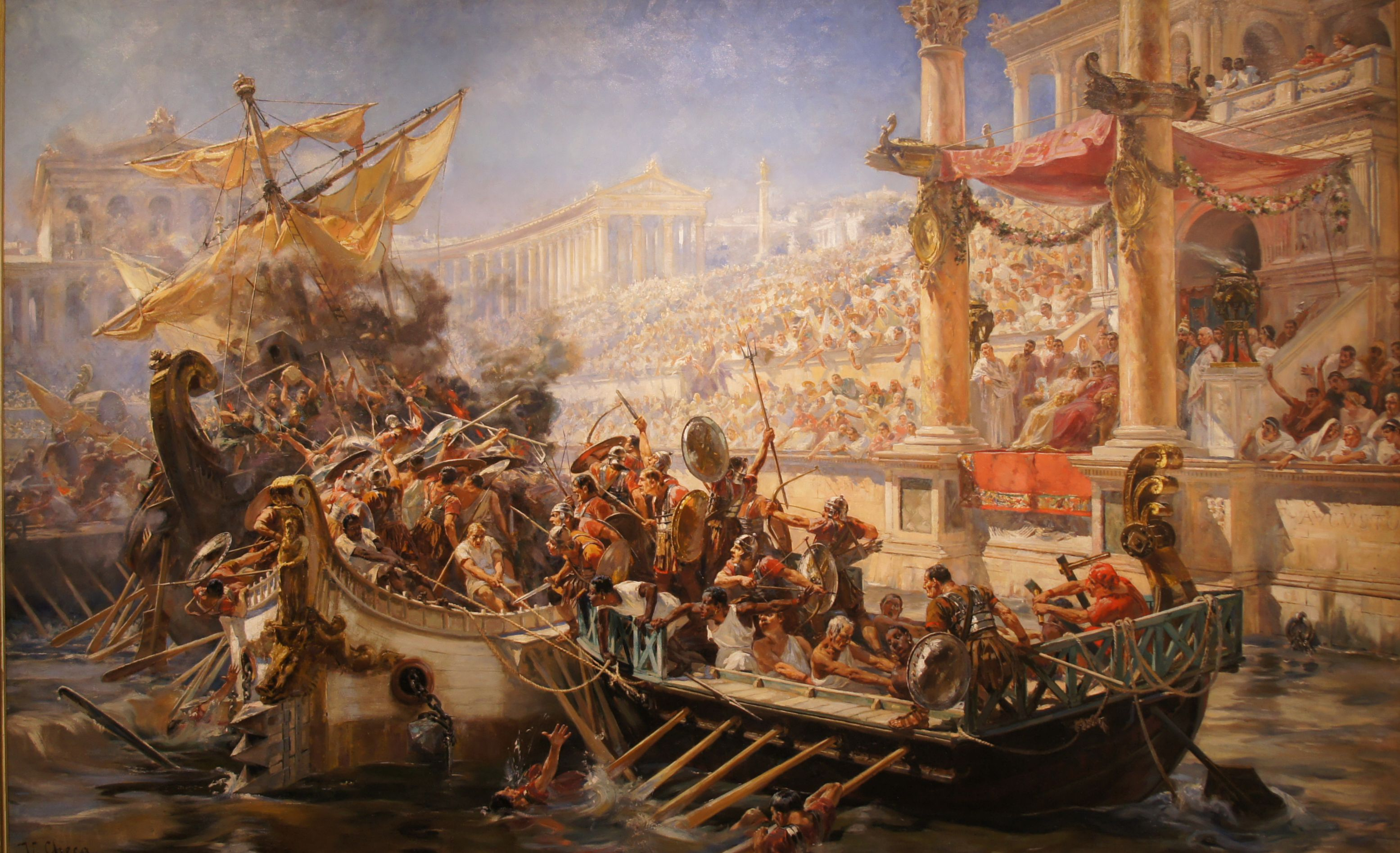
"La naumachie" (The Naval Battle), Ulpiano Checa y Sanz, 1894.

The Naumachia of Augustus (Latin: Naumachia Augusti) was a large, shallow basin constructed by the emperor Augustus on the right bank of the Tiber River. It was supplied with water by the Aqua Alsietina aqueduct and used for staging aquatic spectacles, including reenactments of naval battles.

== Location ==
The Naumachia of Augustus was located on the right bank of the Tiber, in the area known in antiquity as Transtiberim, corresponding to part of modern Trastevere, specifically the plain now occupied by the San Cosimato Monastery. The Residents of Rome list two naumachiae in Region XIV, which encompassed Transtiberim and the Vatican area. One of these is generally identified as the Naumachia Traiani, situated in the Vatican plain. The identity of the second remains uncertain; it could refer to the Naumachia of Augustus, that of Domitian, or that of Philip the Arab. The Naumachia of Domitian has not been definitively located. It may have been dismantled during the reign of Trajan, while the existence of a naumachia under Philip the Arab is considered unlikely. Given the limited remains surviving into the 4th century, the Naumachia of Augustus is regarded as the most probable candidate for the second structure listed in the catalogues.

== History ==
In 2 BCE, Emperor Augustus commissioned the construction of a large basin, or naumachia, on the right bank of the Tiber in an area known as the "Grove of the Caesars." The site was excavated specifically to host staged naval spectacles. That same year, Augustus organized a reenactment of a naval battle representing a conflict between Persians and Athenians. The event featured more than thirty ramming ships, including triremes and biremes, along with numerous smaller vessels. Approximately 3,000 combatants participated, likely corresponding to the crews of around thirty ships, excluding the rowers and operators of the smaller boats.

During the reign of Tiberius (14–37 CE), a naumachia was completed, featuring a large tree trunk placed on a bridge connecting the seating stands to an artificial island in the basin.

In 59 CE, Nero held festivities on boats in Augustus's naumachia. At midnight, the emperor's ship departed via a canal, likely the Naumachia's drainage channel, connecting to the Tiber River.

In 80 CE, Titus staged a naval battle in the same basin, termed the "old naumachia" (veteri naumachia), near the "Grove of Gaius and Lucius," previously known as the "Grove of the Caesars." The basin's edge facing the statues of Gaius and Lucius Caesar was reinforced with planks and platforms, enabling gladiatorial combats and a beast hunt involving 5,000 animals on the first day. The second day featured horse races, and the third day included a naval battle followed by an infantry battle with 3,000 combatants, reenacting the Athenian conquest of Syracuse. The final act occurred on the artificial island, where foot soldiers attacked and captured a wall representing the city.

The last recorded use of Augustus's naumachia was during the spectacles hosted by Titus in 80 CE. Two major fires, in 64 CE and 80 CE, likely prompted population shifts to the right bank of the Tiber, where fires were less frequent. This migration necessitated the development of new residential areas, leading to the repurposing of the naumachia, which freed approximately 200,000 square meters of land. After the 64 CE fire, Nero had debris removed from Ostia, but following the 80 CE fire, Titus and Domitian may have used the rubble to fill the naumachia basin. Once filled and leveled, the land was likely sold or allocated for construction. The process was probably completed under Trajan, who constructed a new naumachia in the Vatican plain, possibly ceding parts of the "Grove of the Caesars" to offset the requisition of land in that area.

The basin of Augustus's naumachia was still partially recognizable during the time of Cassius Dio, between 200 and 240 CE. Although it was gradually filled in, the naumachia may have been used until the 3rd century, but it was likely abandoned in favor of the Naumachia Traiani.

== Description ==
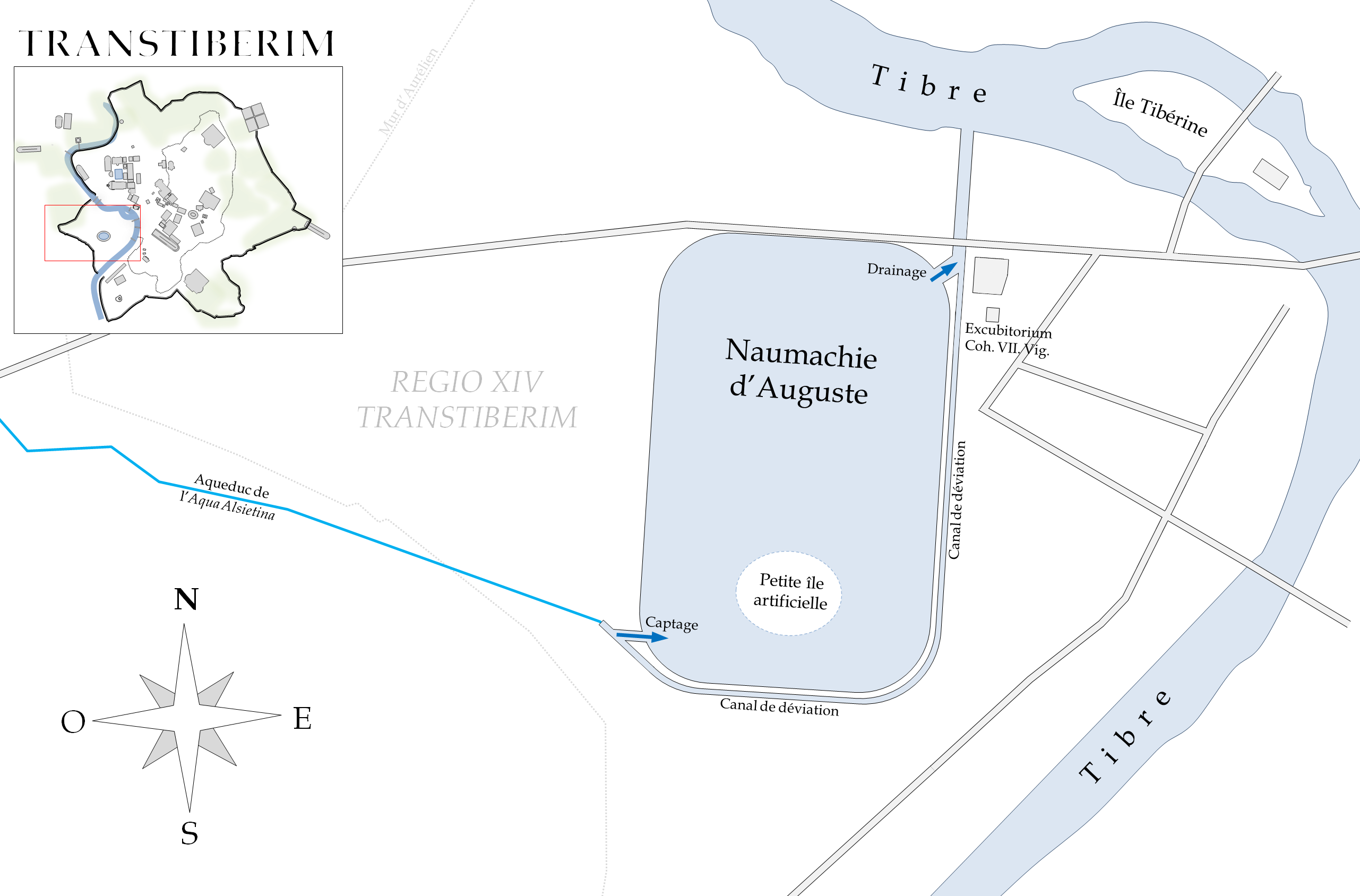
Plan and location of Augustus's naumachia on the right bank of the Tiber, based on the assumption that the basin is rectangular.

=== Dimensions, shape, and orientation ===
==== Dimensions ====
According to Augustus's Res Gestae, the naumachia was constructed on a cleared area measuring 1,800 × 1,200 Roman feet (approximately 533 × 355 meters). Its design was likely influenced by Agrippa's Stagnum in the Campus Martius, which was supplied by the Aqua Virgo aqueduct and measured about 180 × 220 meters. The naumachia's average depth was estimated at 1.5 to 1.7 meters, suitable for maneuvering triremes and biremes, though possibly shallower if smaller vessels or adapted barges were used. The basin likely had a variable depth with a gentle slope toward the drainage point. It is estimated to have required approximately 250,000 cubic meters of water to operate.

==== Shape ====
The basin of Augustus's naumachia is often depicted as elliptical, possibly to minimize the water volume required. Alternatively, a rectangular plan is suggested, as curved walls better resist water pressure only in freestanding structures. Ancient sources indicate that Augustus had the area excavated, consistent with the use of sunken straight walls. Compared to the rectangular Naumachia Traiani, the basin likely had slightly rounded corners.

==== Orientation ====
The Forma Urbis, a marble plan from the Severan era, shows no clear traces of Augustus's naumachia, suggesting that by this time, the site had been redeveloped to accommodate neighborhood expansion. Cassius Dio notes that the naumachia was still partially recognizable between 200 and 240 CE, likely referring to remnants around the monument's periphery, possibly depicted as parallel lines on fragment 471 of the marble plan, representing the remaining stands. In the Transtiberim area, building orientations on the Forma Urbis vary. Streets near the Tiber align with the Via Portuensis, a major road since the Republic, while further inland, they shift to a southwest–northeast axis. This change may reflect the influence of the repurposed naumachia, with new constructions aligning with its original orientation.

=== Specific features ===
Ancient sources describe naumachia festivities as multi-day events featuring both land-based performances and naval battles. The basin could not be emptied or refilled quickly, indicating specialized features, as noted by Cassius Dio in his account of Titus's naumachia. Gladiatorial combats and hunting displays likely occurred on wooden platforms extending over the water, possibly between the artificial island and the basin's edge. Pliny the Elder states that the island was linked to the shore by a bridge, with a 120-Roman-foot tree trunk as its primary component, positioning the island approximately fifty meters from the edge.

=== Hydraulic system ===
==== Water supply ====
The "Aqua Alsietina" aqueduct, constructed specifically to supply Augustus's naumachia, terminated just behind the basin, according to Frontinus. One hypothesis suggests the naumachia was kept dry most of the time to prevent stagnation and microbial growth. However, Frontinus recorded the aqueduct's flow rate in the early 1st century as 392 quinariae (about 14,000 cubic meters per day (Note: The quinaria, a pipe of standardized diameter, was used by Roman engineers to measure water flow rates in conduits. The method for converting flow into pipe diameter is not fully understood, with proposed conversions ranging from 32.8 to 40.6 cubic meters per day (Hodge 1984 & Taylor 1997). A rounded estimate of 35 cubic meters per day, as suggested by Professor Rabun Taylor, is used to calculate the flow rates reported by Frontinus (Taylor 1997, p. 471).)), with 254 quinariae reserved for imperial use. Even at maximum flow, filling the naumachia would have taken 15 to 30 days, depending on its shape and size, which would not fully address stagnation issues. The construction of a dedicated aqueduct used only intermittently seems unlikely. It is more probable that the naumachia was kept filled with continuously flowing water, with fresh water entering via the aqueduct and exiting through a channel, likely open-air, into the Tiber. Nero is recorded as having navigated this channel. The aqueduct's flow rate during Augustus's time was likely higher than that reported by Frontinus.

==== Drainage system ====
Although Augustus's naumachia was likely kept filled with water, it required periodic draining for maintenance. The basin was equipped with a drainage system, including a discharge channel. To empty the naumachia, water from the Aqua Alsietina aqueduct was diverted via a pivoting gate into a bypass channel running south and west along the basin. This channel, initially narrow and possibly concealed within or beneath the spectator seating, widened after joining the discharge channel to increase drainage capacity and direct water to the Tiber. A street to the north, elevated for several dozen meters, may have incorporated a viaduct from the same period as the Pons Aemilius (second half of the 2nd century BCE), potentially reused to cross the naumachia's discharge channel.

The naumachia and its "Aqua Alsietina" aqueduct were supported by a drainage system to manage rainwater and runoff from the Janiculum slopes, preventing flooding in the basin located on a floodplain. A segment of this sewer network, discovered in 1720, buried 9 meters deep above the San Cosimato e Damiano monastery, was initially mistaken by Rodolfo Lanciani for part of the Aqua Alsietina. Measuring 1.78 meters wide and 2.67 meters high, it was significantly larger than the aqueduct's 0.89-meter-wide channel at the Janiculum's summit. It likely served as a collector channel for Janiculum runoff, directed through the naumachia's drainage channel to the Tiber. This drainage system was destroyed in 1849 when soldiers of the Roman Republic used it to access the Janiculum during an attack on the Mediterranean Expeditionary Force (France).

== See also ==
- Augustus
- Tiber
- Aqua Alsietina
- Trastevere

== Bibliography ==
- Coleman, K (1993). "Launching into History : aquatic displays in the Early Empire". JRS (83): 48–74.
- Berlan, Anne (1997). "Les premières naumachies romaines et le développement de la mystique impériale (46 av. J.-C. – 52 apr. J.-C.)" [The first Roman naumachiae and the development of imperial mysticism (46 BC – 52 AD)]. Hypothèses (in French). 1 (1997/1). Publication de la Sorbonne: 97–104. doi:10.3917/hyp.971.0097. ISSN 1298-6216.
- Berlan-Bajard, Anne (2006). Les spectacles aquatiques romains [Roman water shows] (in French). Rome: École Française de Rome. ISBN 2-7283-0719-9.
- Hodge, A. T (1984). "How did Frontinus measure the Quinaria ?". American Journal of Archaeology. 88 (88): 205–216. doi:10.2307/504996. JSTOR 504996.
- Taylor, Rabun (1997). "Torrent or trickle ? The Aqua Alsietina, the Naumachia Augusti, and the Transtiberim". American Journal of Archaeology. 101 (1): 465–492. doi:10.2307/507107. JSTOR 507107.
