= Filippo Barigioni =

Italian sculptor and architect

Barigioni's fountain base supporting the obelisk in front of the Pantheon, Rome.

Detail of fountain facing the Pantheon

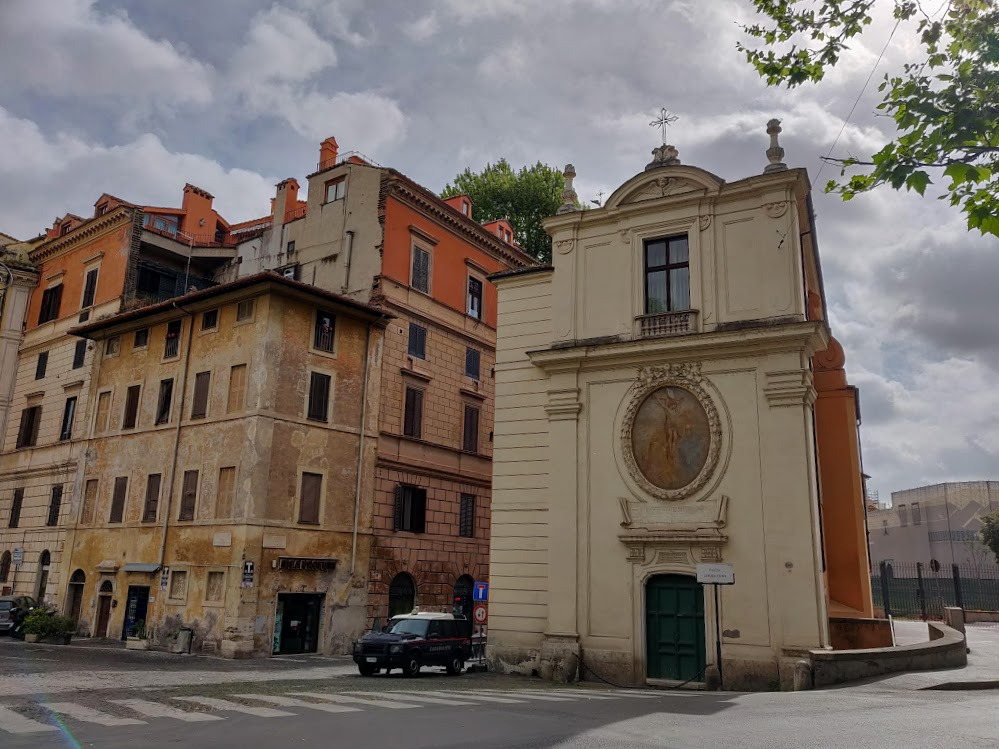
San Gregorio della Divina Pietà, Rome, completed 1729.

Filippo Barigioni (1690–1753) was an Italian sculptor and architect working in the Late Baroque tradition.

== Biography ==
Filippo Barigioni was born in Rome around 1680 and studied architecture under Mattia de Rossi. Initially a follower of Bernini, he later adopted the more classically-oriented style of Carlo Fontana and Pietro Bracci. Barigioni collaborated with Fontana on the design of the Albani Chapel in the Church of San Sebastiano fuori le mura, commissioned by Pope Clement XI around 1706. The rich marble and stucco decorations are typically Baroque yet possess a certain refined eighteenth-century elegance. These would serve as a model for Barigioni's later works.

Following Clement XI's death in 1721, Barigioni was commissioned to design the pontiff's catafalque inside St. Peter's Basilica. The towering catafalque structure featured elaborate Baroque ornamentation, including tiered papal insignia (the tiara and cushions) and allegorical figures or angels holding the heraldic coat of arms of Pope Clement XI. Barigioni also designed the catafalques of Pope Innocent XIII (1724) and Pope Clement XII (1740) and Augustus II of Poland (1733). In the 1740s, Barigioni created the monumental statue of Saint Norbert for St Peter's Basilica.

Building on his experience with the Albani Chapel in San Sebastiano, Barigioni oversaw work on the chapel dedicated to Francis of Paola in Sant'Andrea delle Fratte between 1726 and 1736. The chapel is adorned with coloured marbles and bronzes that cover the walls, creating dazzling surfaces of a purely pictorial quality. In the following years Barigioni received commissions for several restoration projects, the most interesting of which was that of the Church of San Domenico, Urbino. In front of the smooth Gothic façade, Barigioni added a two-storey access staircase whose restrained forms attempt to harmonise with the roof's slope and the building's overall simplicity.

Upon returning to Rome, Bracci undertook another major restoration project at the Basilica of San Marco Evangelista al Campidoglio, commissioned by Cardinal Angelo Maria Querini. The altar screens, choir and brick columns clad in jasper – replacing the ancient granite ones flanking the nave piers – signal a return to the decorative exuberance of the chapel at Sant'Andrea delle Fratte. The most emblematic work from this period is the funerary monument to Maria Clementina Sobieska in St Peter's Basilica. Executed in 1739, it was realized in collaboration with Pietro Bracci. Evidence of Bernini's influence, specifically in the monuments to Pope Urban VIII and Pope Alexander VII, can be seen in the pyramidal composition framed by two columns and underscored by the picturesque motif of drapery enveloping the figure of Charity, who holds a portrait of the deceased. However, this lavish Baroque features are tempered by a quest for refined eighteenth-century elegance.

== Main works ==
- Fontana della Rotonda (1711). The fountain setting for the Egyptian obelisk that faces the Pantheon was commissioned by the Albani pope Clement XI; Barigioni was commissioned to re-erect an Egyptian obelisk (the Obelisco Macuteo) in the place of the central vase of Giacomo Della Porta's fountain (1575) in the centre of Piazza della Rotonda. Luigi Amici carved the four dolphins at the base of the pedestal (illustration). The ensemble was adapted in 1880.
- Palazzo Testa-Piccolomini (1718)
- Aqueduct and municipal fountain at Nepi (1727). The spectacular buttressed piers of the aqueduct's high arches are still a monumental sight in Nepi. Barigioni also designed the public fountain, set into a niche in the façade of the Palazzo Communale, where the aqueduct's water issues from the heraldic tower of Pope Benedict XIII.
- Fountain in Corneto (modern Tarquinia) (1727), celebrating the Conti pope Innocent XIII.
- Façade for church of San Gregorio della Divina Pietà (1727–29). Barigioni designed the façade for the church in Piazza Monte Savello, near the Theater of Marcellus, first mentioned in twelfth-century. The church stood just outside the Roman Ghetto; the inscriptions in Hebrew and Latin on the scroll above the door were intended "che rimproverano la perfidia ed ostinazione degli Ebrei" according to Giuseppe Vasi's Itinerario 1761. (illustration).
- Church of Sant'Andrea delle Fratte. (1736). Right transept altar with the bronze and marble image of S. Francesco di Paola (Titi-Bottari 1763). The altarpiece is by Paris Nogari, the stucco angels by Giovanni Battista Maini.
- Velletri, Palazzo Comunale, (completed 1741). The town hall, begun in 1572 by Giacomo della Porta to a design by Jacopo Barozzi da Vignola, was completed by Barigioni.
- Church of San Marco (1744). Interior redecorations, Cardinal Angelo Querini.
- Exedra in the courtyard of the Palazzo Nuovo of the Campidoglio (1734), with the arms of Clement XII, celebrating the installation of the Musei Capitolini.
- Monument to Queen Maria Clementina Sobieska (1739–42), St Peter's, Rome. He designed the monument, which was executed by the sculptor Pietro Bracci; the realistic and theatrical white and colored marble funeral monument commemorated the consort of the Stuart pretender James Francis Stuart.
- Chapel of S. Fabiano, in the Church of San Sebastian on the Appian Way, erected to glorify the Albani family to designs of Carlo Maratta, was executed by Carlo Fontana, Alessandro Specchi and Barigioni (Titi-Bottari 1763; TCI 1965395)
- Church of Madonna del Pascolo and Ss. Sergius and Bacchus. High altar designed by Barigioni (Titi-Bottari 1763).
