= Pons Cestius =

Ancient Roman bridge in Rome

Pons Cestius Italian: Ponte Cestio
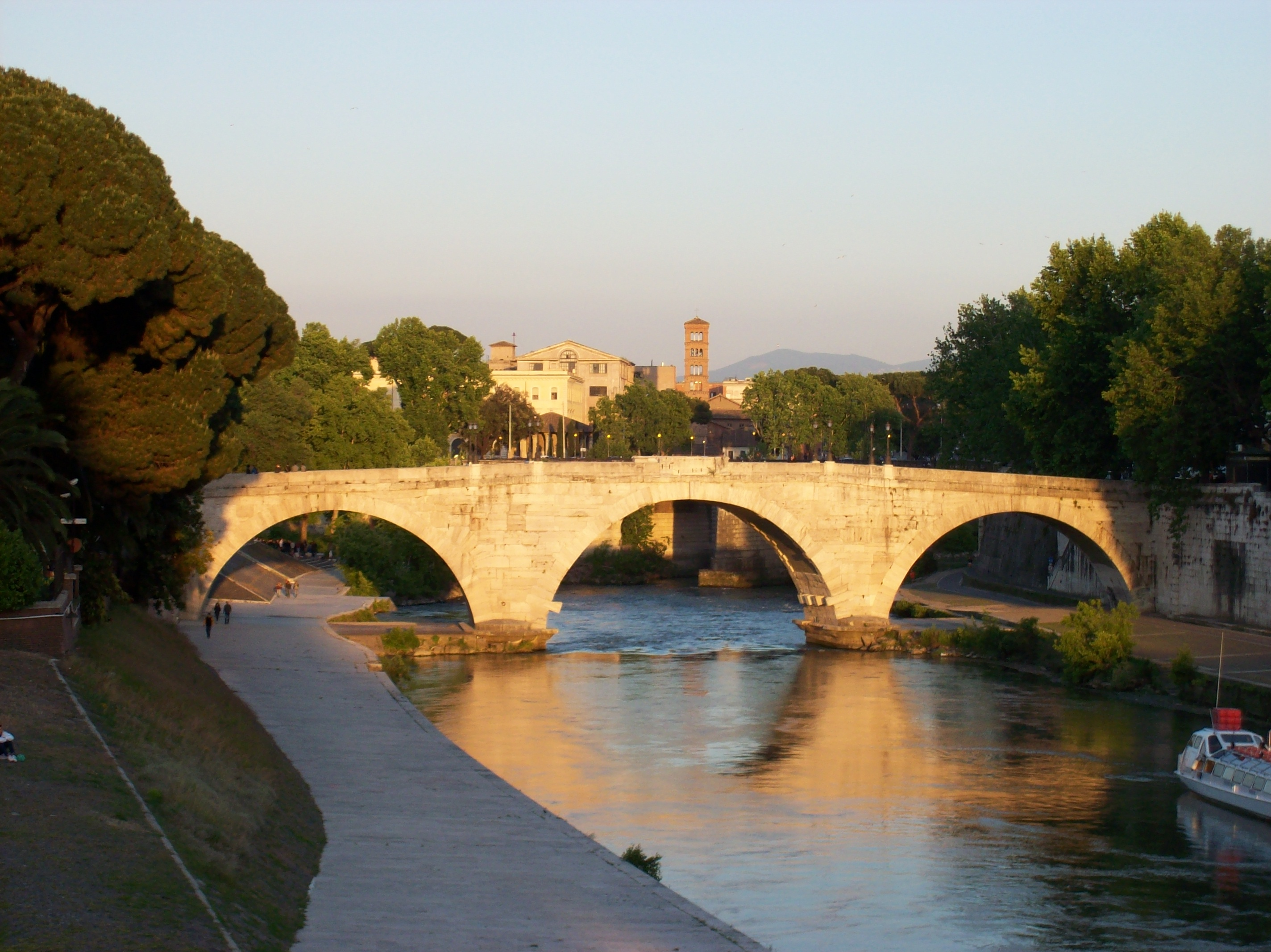
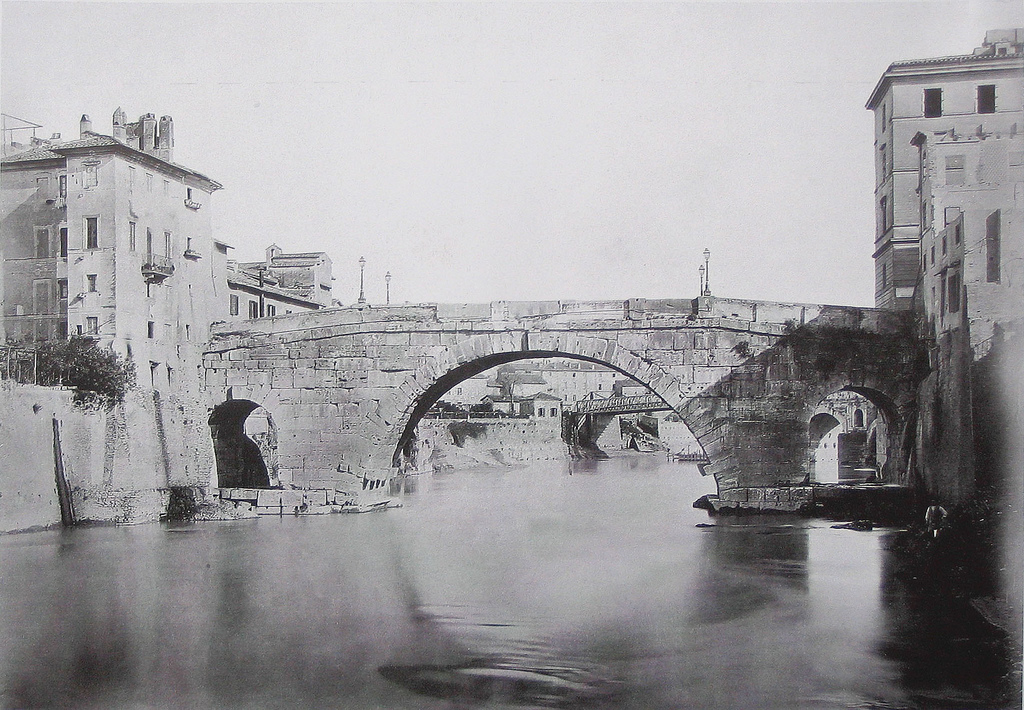
- The Pons Cestius in its modern form The Roman bridge around 1880, before its reconstruction
- Coordinates: 41°53′24.8″N 12°28′38″E
- Carries: pedestrians, motor vehicles
- Crosses: Tiber; Tiber Island–Trastevere; (Piazza S. Bartolomeo all'Isola–Lungotevere degli Anguillara)
- Locale: Rome, Italy
- Next upstream: Ponte Garibaldi
- Next downstream: Ponte Palatino

Characteristics
- Design: arch bridge
- Material: Stone (tuff, peperino, travertine)
- Total length: 80.4 metres (264 ft) (modern); 48 metres (157 ft) (ancient)
- Width: 8.2 metres (27 ft) (ancient)
- Longest span: 23.65 metres (77.6 ft) (ancient)
- No. of spans: 3
- Piers in water: 2

History
- Built: c. 62 – c. 27 BC; (first stone bridge); 370 AD; (Pons Gratiani)
- Rebuilt: 1880–1892; (present bridge)

Location
- Click on the map for a fullscreen view

The Pons Cestius (Latin for the "Cestian Bridge"; Italian: Ponte Cestio) is an ancient Roman bridge connecting the right bank of the Tiber with the west bank of Tiber Island in Rome, Italy. In Late Antiquity, the bridge was replaced and renamed the Pons Gratiani ("Bridge of Gratian"). It is also known as Ponte San Bartolomeo (Italian for "Bridge of St Bartholomew"). No more than one third of the present stone bridge is of ancient material, as it was entirely rebuilt and extended in the 19th century after numerous earlier restorations.

== Ancient bridges ==
=== 1st-century BC bridge ===
The original bridge was built around the 1st century BC (some time between 62 and 27 BC), after the Pons Fabricius, which connects the other side of island to the river's left bank. The identity of the Cestius referred to in the bridge's name is unknown. He may have been responsible for building the bridge or for later restoring an existing one, and may have been a member of the gens Cestia during the later Roman Republic.

The Pons Cestius was the first bridge that reached the right bank of the Tiber from Tiber Island. Whereas the island was long connected with the left bank of the Tiber and the heart of ancient Rome, even before the Pons Fabricius was built, the right bank (Transtiber) remained unconnected until the Pons Cestius was constructed. Several members of the Cestii from the 1st century BC are known, but it is unknown which of them was responsible. The gens Cestia was not a prominent family until the time of Gaius Cestius Epulo, whose tomb, the Pyramid of Cestius (about 18–12 BC), survives, built into Rome's 3rd-century Aurelian Walls.

The Pons Cestius was restored during the reign of the emperor Antoninus Pius (r. 138–161); an inscription commemorating the rebuilding was installed on the structure.

=== 4th-century bridge ===
In the 4th century, the Pons Cestius was replaced by a new structure. According to the 5th century Latin historian Polemius Silvius, in 370 it was rededicated as the Pons Gratiani, to the brother-emperors Valentinian I (r. 364–375) and Valens (r. 364–378) and Valentinian's son Gratian (r. 367–383), the reigning co-augusti of the Valentinianic dynasty. The bridge was rebuilt using volcanic tuff stone and peperino marble, with a facing of travertine limestone. Some of the rebuilding material came from the demolished portico of the nearby Theatre of Marcellus. Inscriptions on marble panels commemorating the work and naming the emperors were installed on the bridge and on the parapet. The 4th-century bridge probably followed the architectural lines of its Republican predecessor. Before the 19th-century rebuilding, the bridge was 48 metres (157 ft) long, with central arch spanning of 23.65 metres (77.6 ft) flanked by two arches each spanning 5.8 metres (19 ft). The bridge was 8.2 metres (27 ft) broad.

Both the pontes Cestius and Fabricius were long-lived bridges. Although the Fabricius remains wholly intact, the Ponte Cestio was restored several times from the 12th century and wholly dismantled and rebuilt in the 19th century, with only some of the ancient structure preserved.

== Present bridge ==
=== 19th-century rebuilding ===
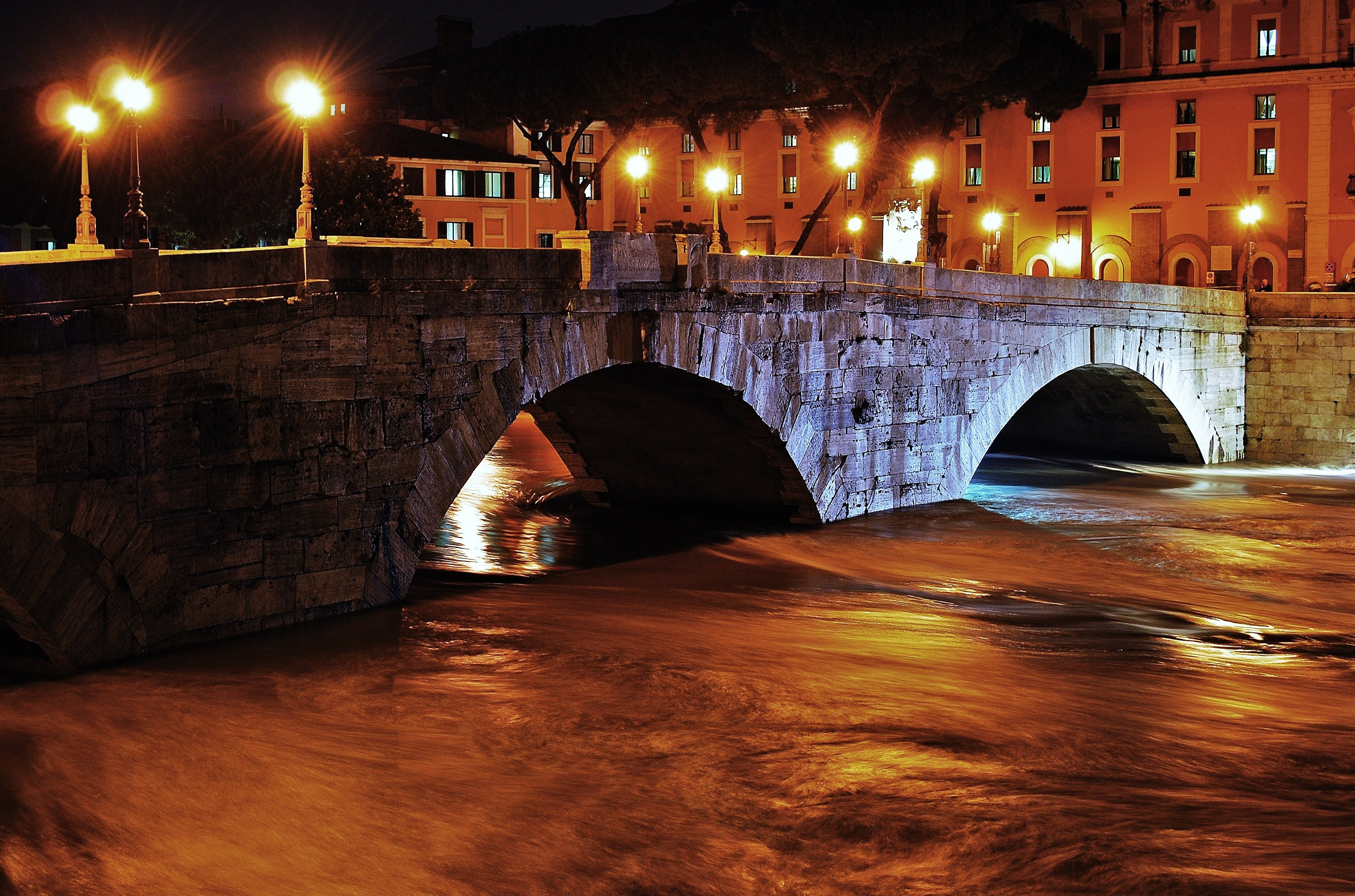
The Tiber running high, December 2008

During the embankment of the Tiber's channel in 1888–1892, the building of the walls and boulevards (the lungoteveri) along the river necessitated the Roman bridge's demolition and the reconstruction of a new bridge. The ancient bridge, which had two small arches either side of the wide central span, was simply not long enough. The present bridge, with three large arches, was constructed in its stead, with its central arch reusing about two-thirds of the original material.

Two thirds of the present structure dates to this period, with only around a third of the structure built from pre-modern material. After the 19th-century rebuilding, the bridge was 80.4 metres (264 ft) long, with the original central arch flanked by two other arches of equal span. The Italian name Bridge of St Bartholomew derives from the church and minor basilica of San Bartolomeo all'Isola ("St Bartholomew of the Island") on Tiber Island.

== See also ==
- Pons Fabricius – Ancient Roman bridge, a landmark of Rome, Italy
- List of Roman bridges
- Roman architecture
- Roman engineering

== Sources ==
- O’Connor, Colin (1993). Roman Bridges. Cambridge University Press. pp. 66f. ISBN 0-521-39326-4.

Preceded by Vigna Randanini	Landmarks of Rome; Pons Cestius	Succeeded by Pons Fabricius
