= Mount Fumaiolo =

Mountain in Italy

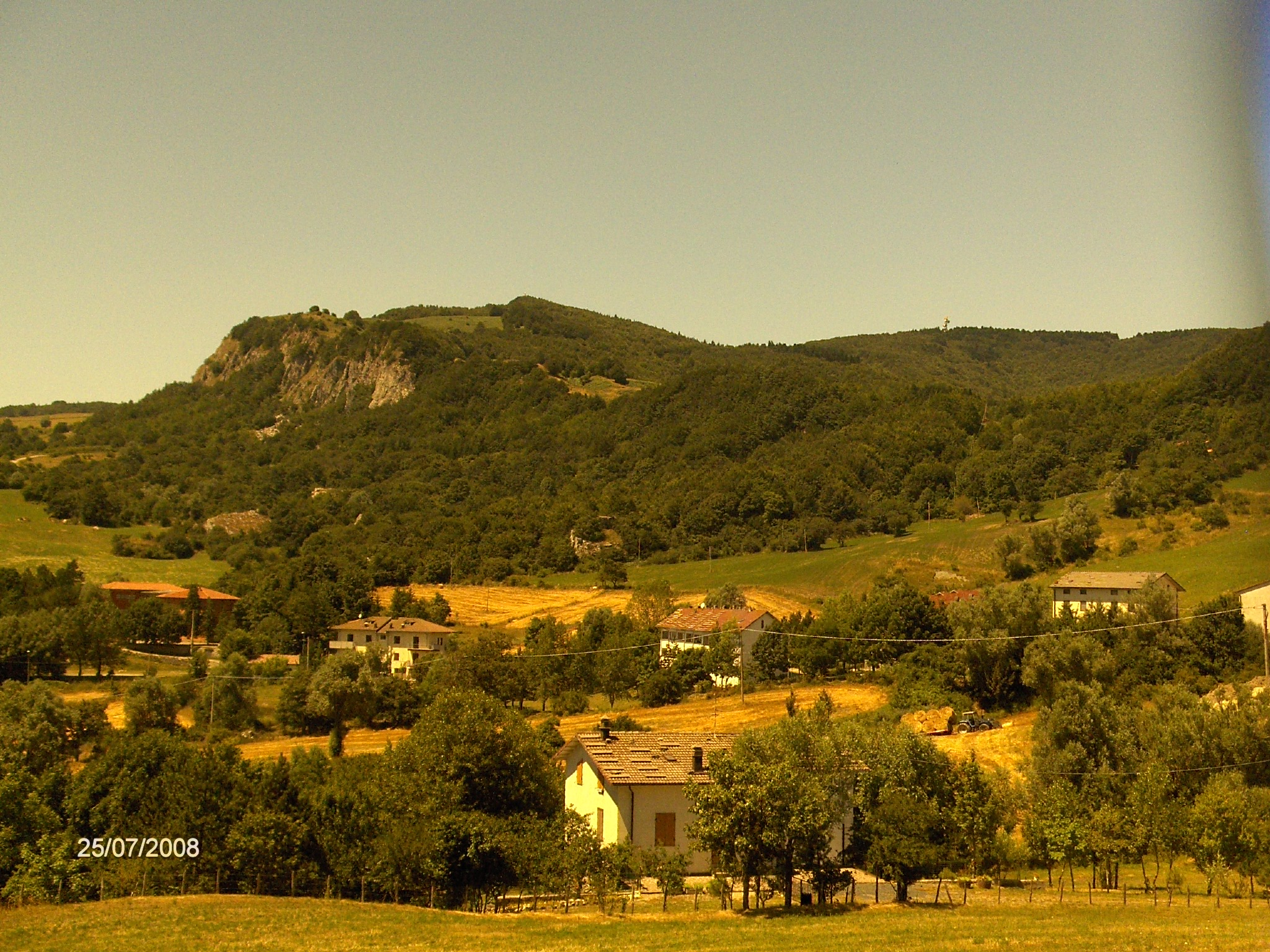

Highest point
- Elevation: 1,407 m (4,616 ft)
- Prominence: 488 m (1,601 ft)
- Coordinates: 43°47′15.20″N 12°4′33.95″E

Geography
- Location within Italy
- Location: Italy
- Parent range: Apennine Mountains

Mount Fumaiolo (Italian: Monte Fumaiolo) is a mountain of the northern Apennines range of Italy located in the southernmost corner of the Emilia-Romagna region, c. 70 km from the town of Cesena. It's at the border between Emilia-Romagna and Tuscany. With an elevation of 1,407 metres (4,616 ft), Mount Fumaiolo overlooks the villages of Balze di Verghereto, Bagno di Romagna and Verghereto, in Romagna, and thanks to its extensive fir and beech forests, it is a well-appreciated tourist area of natural interest. It is most famous for being the source of the Tiber, as well as the river Savio.

== The Springs of the river Tiber ==
The source of the river Tiber (Tevere in Italian) originally consisted of two springs a few meters away from each other on the slopes of Mount Fumaiolo. Although nowadays only one spring remains active, the area is still called "Le Vene del Tevere"; vene is Italian for "veins". The active spring is located in a beech forest at 1,268 meters above sea level on the southern slopes of Mount Fumaiolo, near the village of Balze di Verghereto in the Emilia-Romagna region. In 1927, under Benito Mussolini's dictatorship, an antique marble column from the Roman Forum was placed on the spot, with an inscription on it: QUI NASCE IL FIUME SACRO AI DESTINI DI ROMA ("Here the river is born, sacred to the destinies of Rome"), to mark the association of the Fascist regime with the ancient Roman empire. A Roman eagle stands on the top of the column, and three wolf heads, each holding a ring in its mouth, are visible on the sides. In its first kilometers the Tiber runs through Emilia-Romagna; then it enters Valtiberina in Tuscany before crossing Umbria and entering Lazio to flow past Rome. After 405 kilometers, the Tiber pours its waters into the Tyrrhenian Sea. It is the third-longest Italian river, after the Po and the Adige, and the second in volume of water discharge, after the Po.

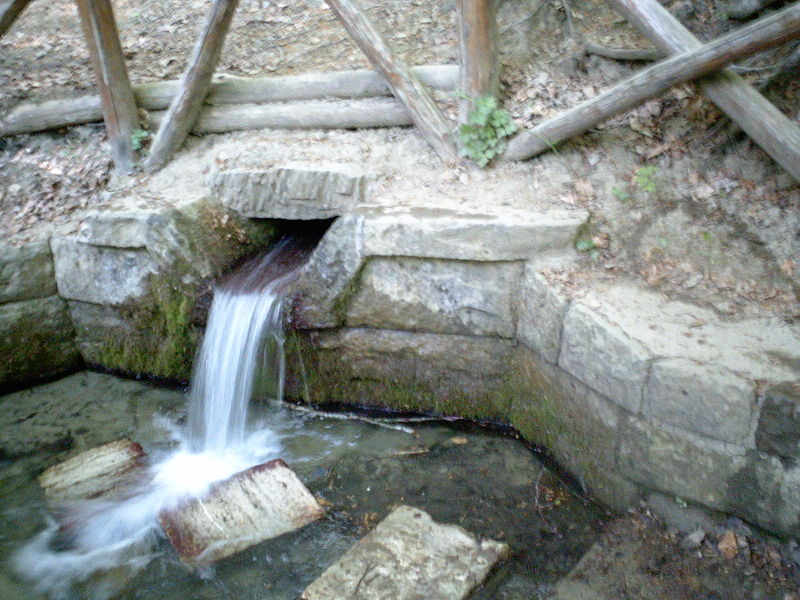
The source of the Tiber

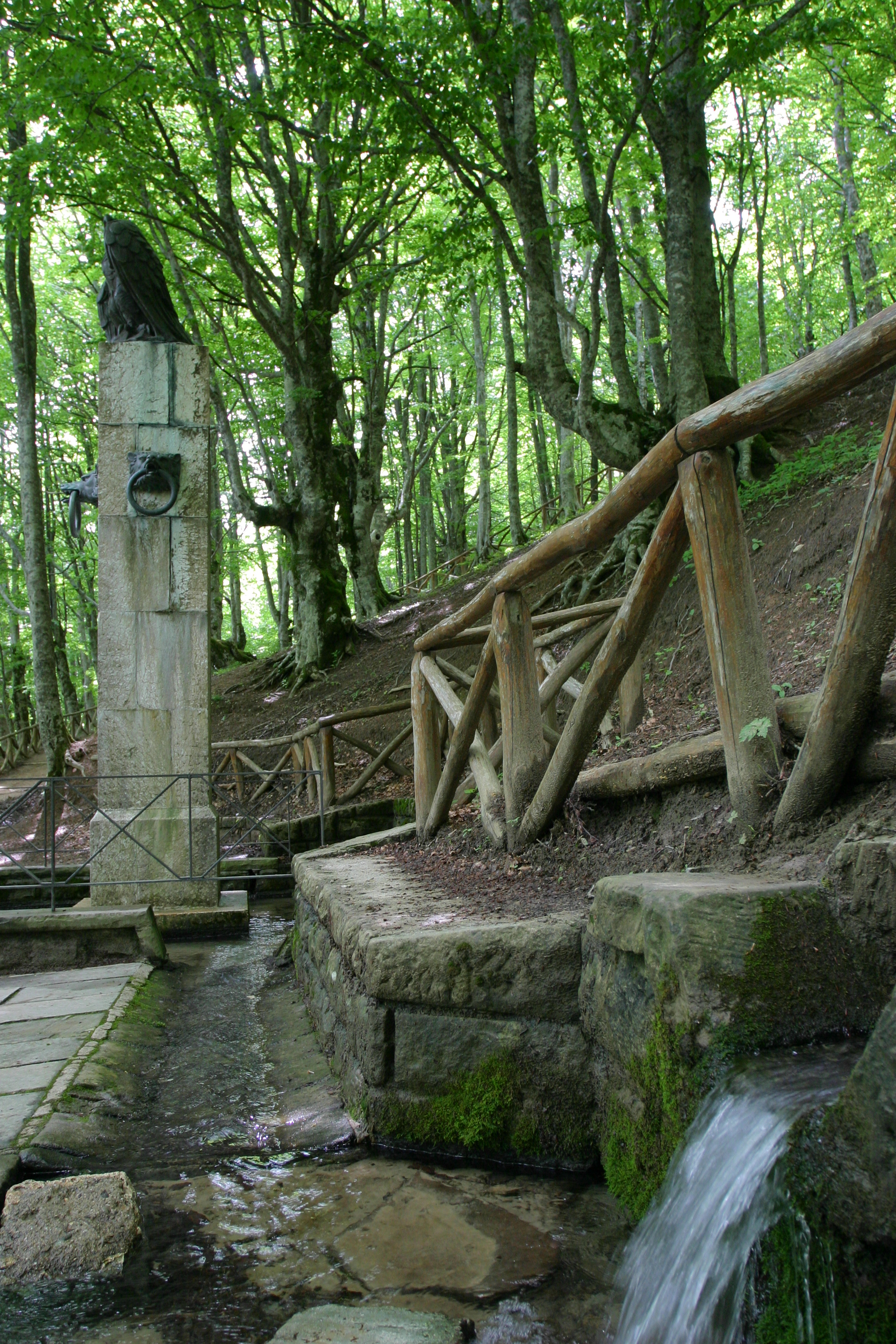
The source of the Tiber (side view)

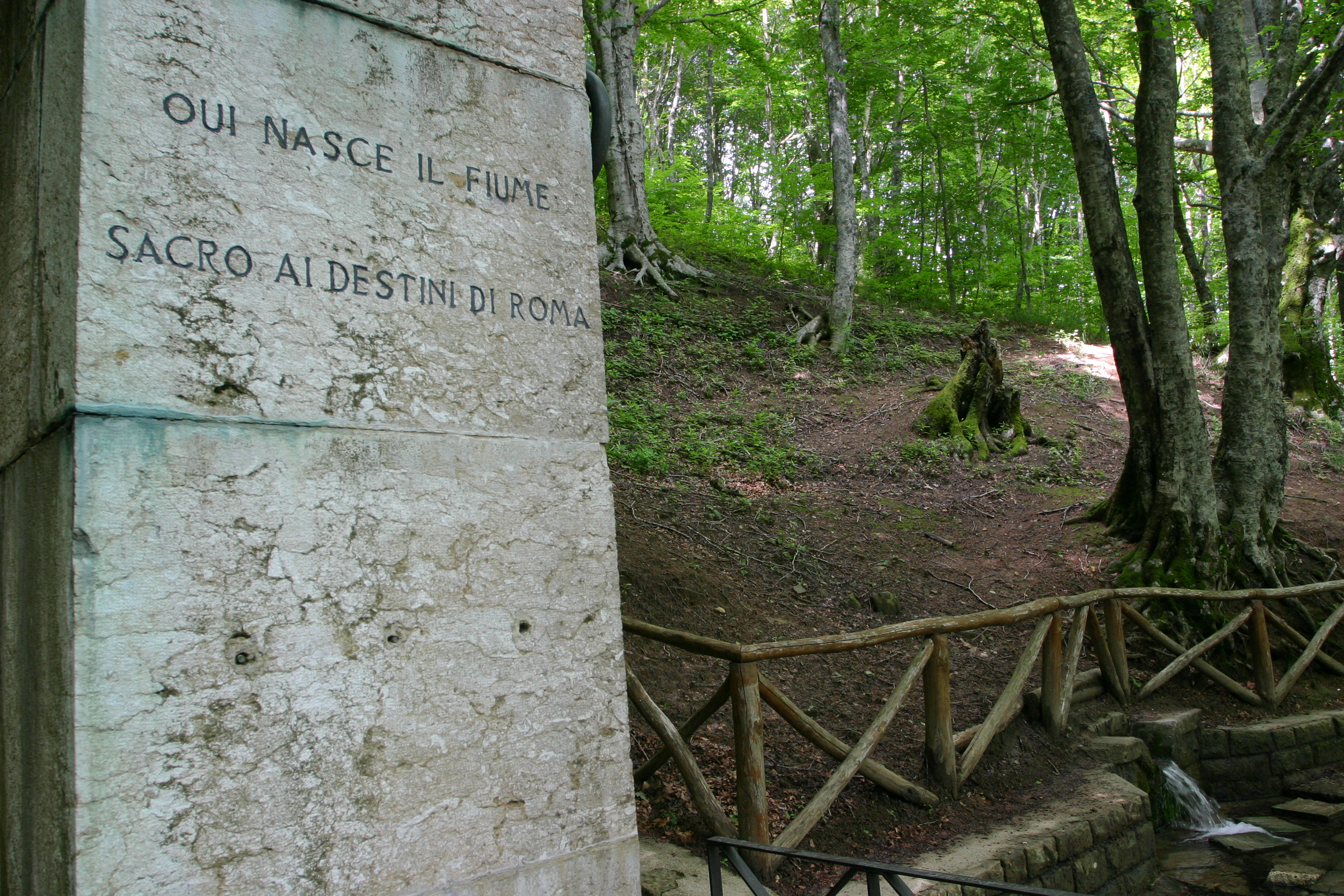
Benito Mussolini's inscription

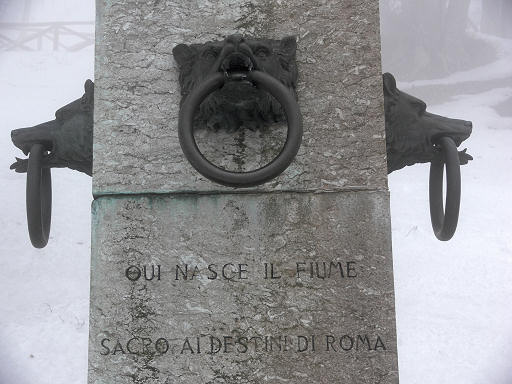
The inscription and ornaments

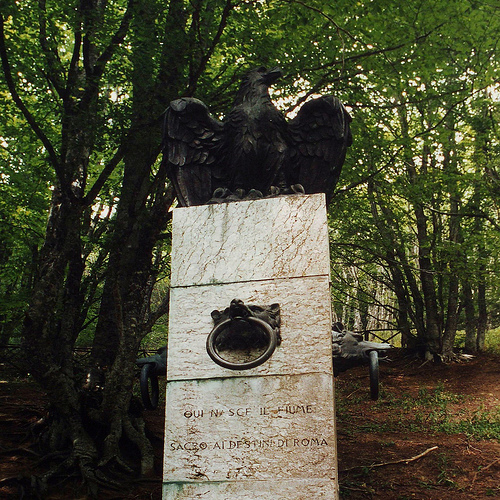
The eagle on the column

== See also ==
- Foreste Casentinesi, Monte Falterona, Campigna National Park
