= Tiber =

Major river in central Italy

Coordinates: 41.7405°N 12.2334°E

Tiber Rumon
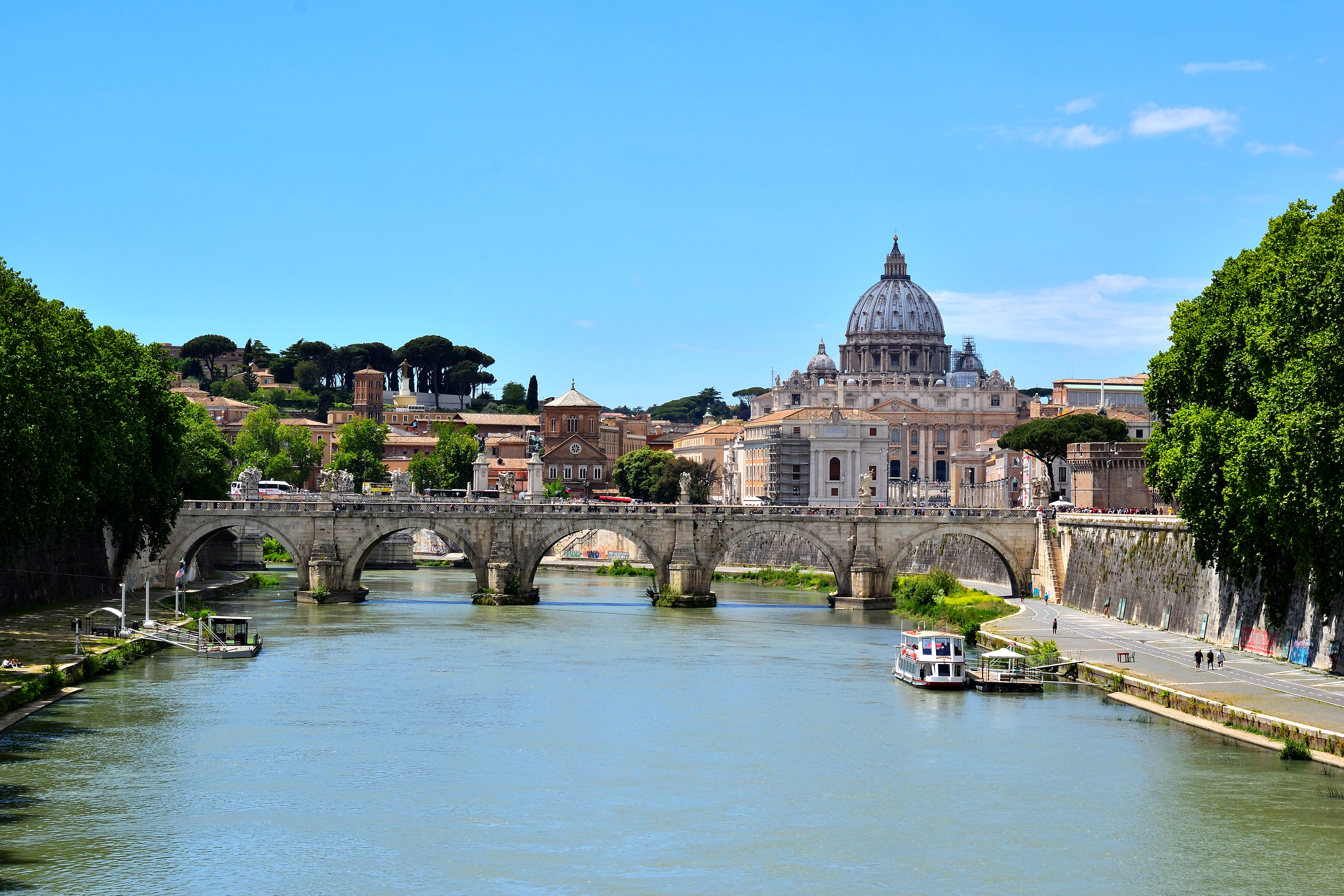
- The Tiber in Rome near the Ponte Sant'Angelo

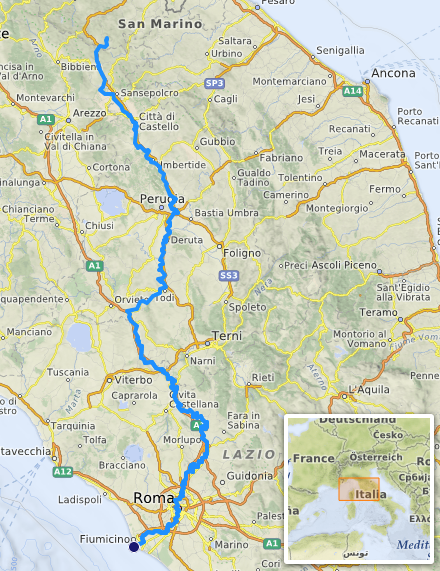
- Native name: Tevere (Italian)

Location
- Country: Italy

Physical characteristics
- Source
  - location: Mount Fumaiolo
  - elevation: 1,268 m (4,160 ft)
- Mouth
  - location: Tyrrhenian Sea
- Length: 406 km (252 mi)
- Basin size: 17,375 km^{2} (6,709 mi^{2})
- Discharge
  - average: 239 m^{3}/s (8,400 cu ft/s) (in Rome)

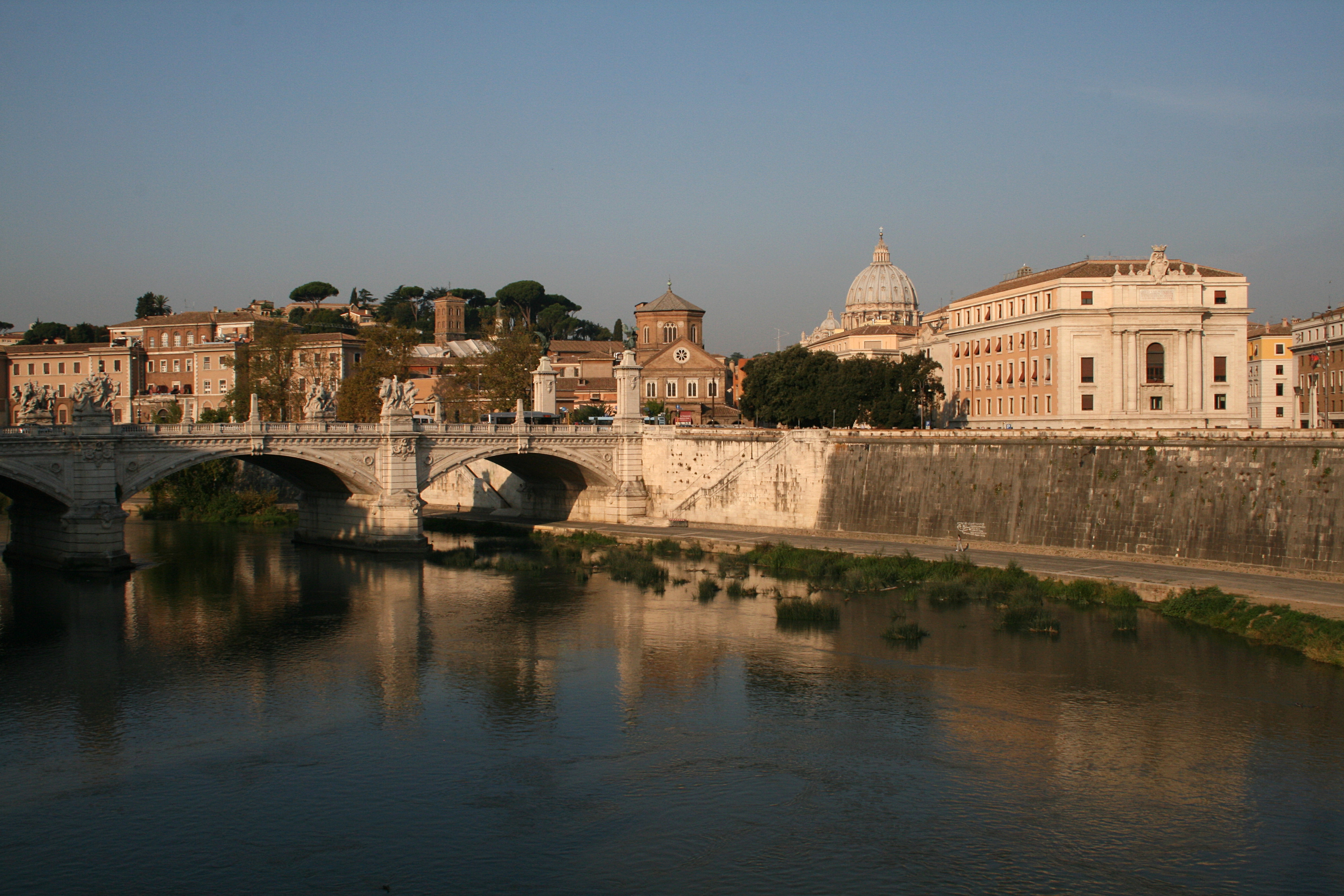
View of the Tiber looking towards Vatican City

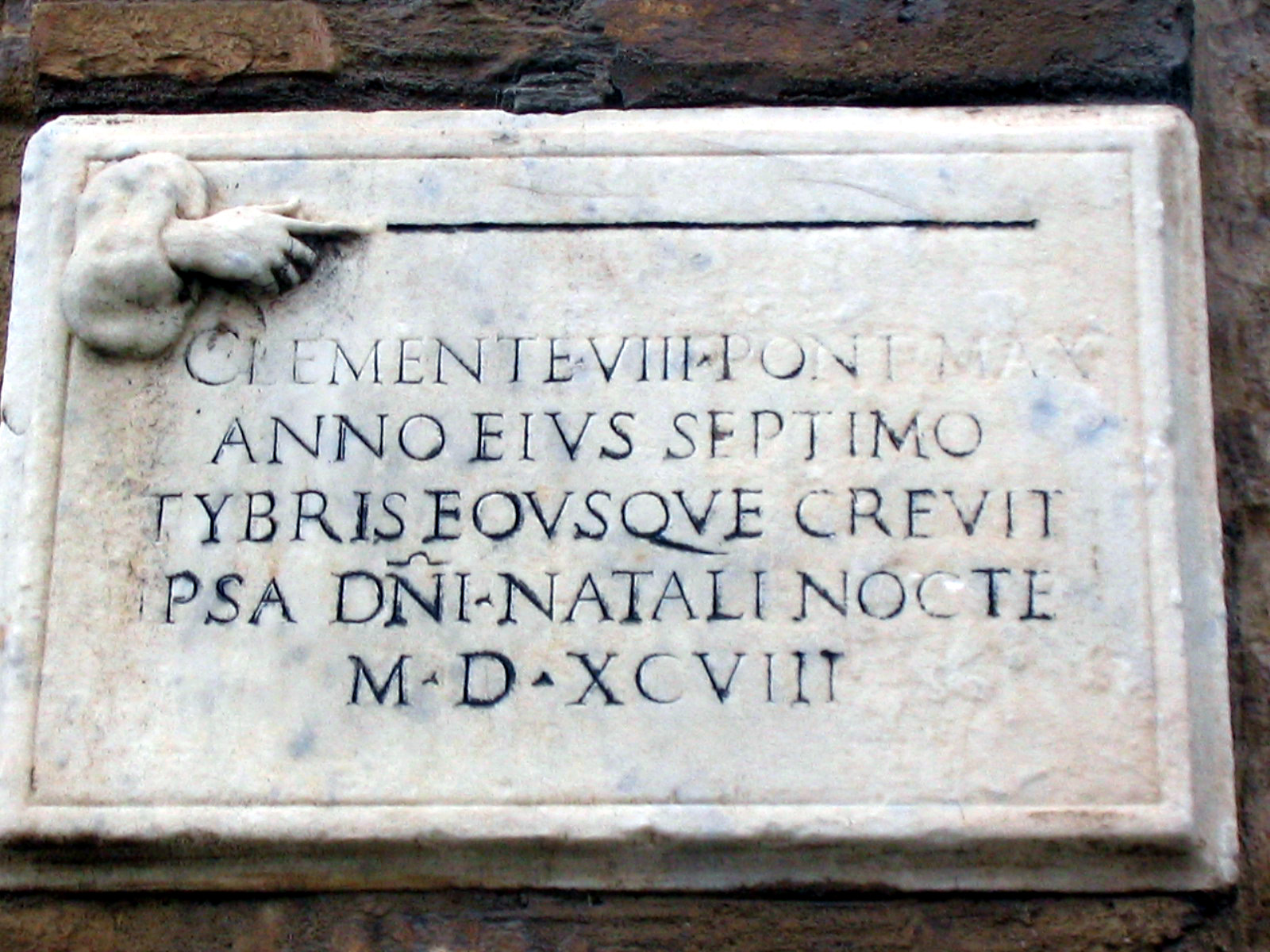
Rome flood marker, 1598, set into a pillar of the Santo Spirito Hospital near Basilica di San Pietro.

Highest level of Tiber for 40+ years, 13 December 2008, at Tiber Island.

The Tiber (/ˈtaɪbər/ TY-bər; Italian: Tevere [ˈteːvere]; Latin: Tiberis) is the third-longest river in Italy and the longest in Central Italy, rising in the Apennine Mountains in Emilia-Romagna and flowing 406 km (252 mi) through Tuscany, Umbria, and Lazio, where it is joined by the River Aniene, to the Tyrrhenian Sea, between Ostia and Fiumicino. It drains a basin estimated at 17,375 km^{2} (6,709 sq mi). The river has achieved lasting fame as the main watercourse of the city of Rome, which was founded on its eastern banks.

The river rises at Mount Fumaiolo in Central Italy and flows in a generally southerly direction past Perugia and Rome to meet the sea at Ostia. Discharge at the river mouth can vary, according to season, between 30 cubic metres per second and more than 300m^{3}/s. The Tiber has advanced significantly at its mouth, by about 3 km (2 mi), since Roman times, leaving the ancient port of Ostia Antica 6 kilometres (4 miles) inland. However, it does not form a proportional delta, owing to a strong north-flowing sea current close to the shore, due to the steep shelving of the coast, and to slow tectonic subsidence.

The Tiber watershed according to the HydroBASINS database.

== Sources ==
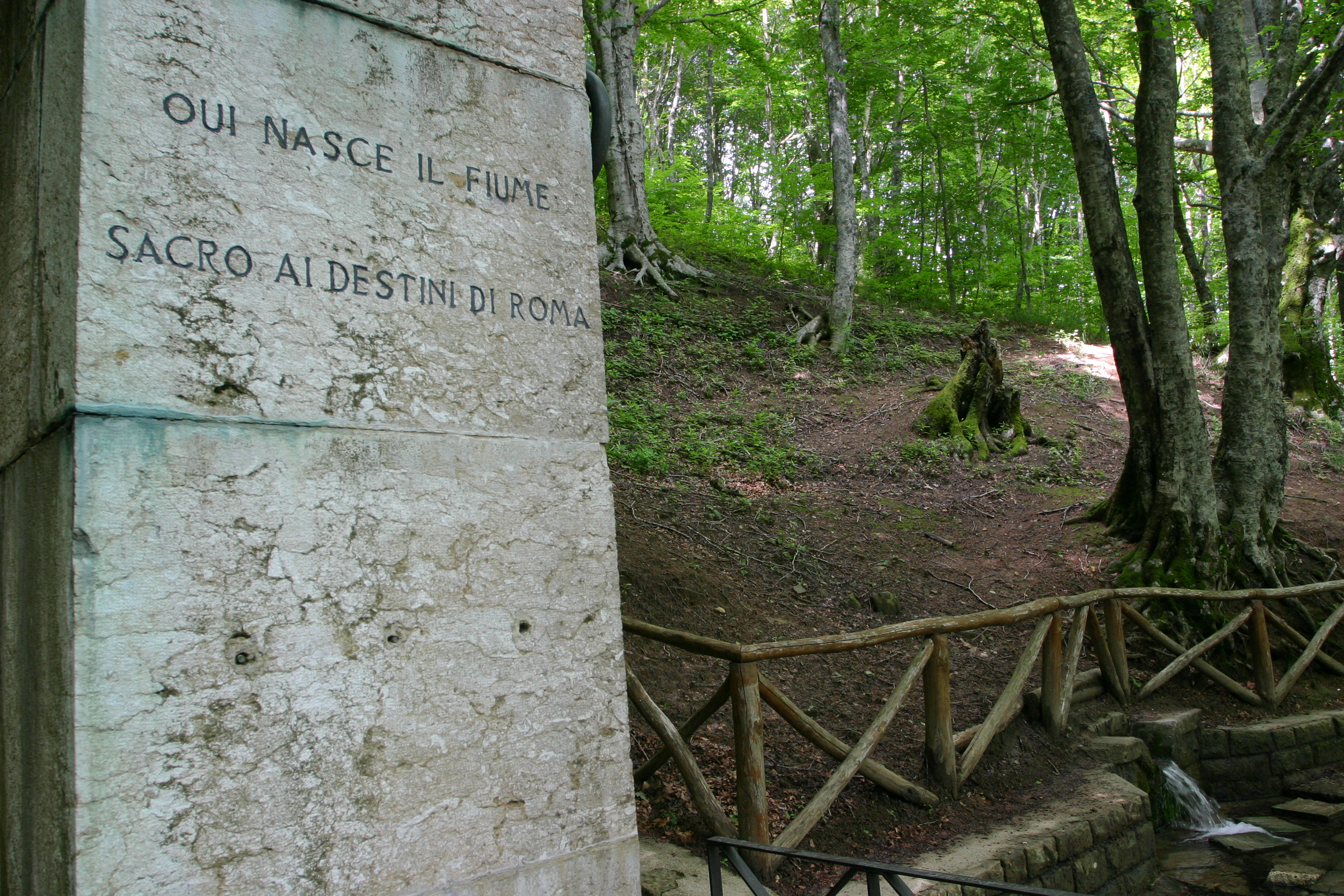
Column built in 1930s near the source of Tiber

The source of the Tiber consists of two springs 10 m (33 ft) away from each other on Mount Fumaiolo. These springs are called Le Vene. The springs are in a beech forest 1,268 m (4,160 ft) above sea level. During the 1930s, Benito Mussolini had an antique marble Roman column built at the point where the river rises, inscribed QUI NASCE IL FIUME SACRO AI DESTINI DI ROMA ("Here is born the river / sacred to the destinies of Rome"). An eagle is on the top of the column, part of its fascist symbolism. The first kilometres of the Tiber run through Valtiberina before entering Umbria.

== Etymology ==
The genesis of the name Tiber probably was pre-Latin, like the Roman name of Tibur (modern Tivoli), and may be Italic in origin. The same root is found in the Latin praenomen Tiberius. Also, Etruscan variants of this praenomen are in Thefarie (borrowed from Faliscan *Tiferios, lit. '(He) from the Tiber' < *Tiferis 'Tiber') and Teperie (via the Latin hydronym Tiber).

Legendary king Tiberinus, ninth in the king-list of Alba Longa, was said to have drowned in the River Albula, which was afterwards called Tiberis. The myth may have explained a memory of an earlier, perhaps pre-Indo-European name for the river, "white" (alba) with sediment, or "from the mountains" from pre-Indo-European word "alba, albion" mount, elevated area. Tiberis/Tifernus may be a pre-Indo-European substrate word related to Aegean tifos "still water", Greek phytonym τύφη a kind of swamp and river bank weed (Typha angustifolia), Iberian hydronyms Tibilis, Tebro and Numidian Aquae Tibilitanae. Yet another etymology is from *dubri-, water, considered by Alessio as Sicel, whence the form Θύβρις later Tiberis. This root *dubri- is widespread in Western Europe e.g. Dover, Portus Dubris.

The river was also called Rumon in antiquity, according to the 4th–5th century commentator Servius, who stated that the Tiber was named Rumon from the Latin verb ruminare, "to chew", in reference to the river's banks "gnawing" at the land. A further theory is offered by etymologist Edmond Jung (University of Strasbourg), who suggests Ficus Ruminalis: a sacred tree found growing on the bank where Romulus and Remus washed ashore.

== History ==
According to legend, the city of Rome was founded in 753 BC on the banks of the Tiber about 25 km (16 mi) from the sea at Ostia. Tiber Island, in the center of the river between Trastevere and the ancient city center, was the site of an important ancient ford and was later bridged. Legend says Rome's founders, the twin brothers Romulus and Remus, were abandoned on its waters, where they were rescued by the she-wolf, Lupa.

The river marked the boundary between the lands of the Etruscans to the west, the Sabines to the east and the Latins to the south. Benito Mussolini, born in Romagna, adjusted the boundary between Tuscany and Emilia-Romagna, so that the springs of the Tiber would lie in Romagna.

The Tiber was critically important to Roman trade and commerce, as ships could reach as far as 100 km (60 mi) upriver; some evidence indicates that it was used to ship grain from the Val Teverina as long ago as the fifth century BC. It was later used to ship stone, timber, and foodstuffs to Rome.

During the Punic Wars of the third century BC, the harbour at Ostia became a key naval base. It later became Rome's most important port, where wheat, olive oil, and wine were imported from Rome's colonies around the Mediterranean. Wharves were also built along the riverside in Rome itself, lining the riverbanks around the Campus Martius area. The Romans connected the river with a sewer system (the Cloaca Maxima) and with an underground network of tunnels and other channels, to bring its water into the middle of the city.

Wealthy Romans had garden-parks or horti on the banks of the river in Rome through the first century BC. These may have been sold and developed about a century later.

The heavy sedimentation of the river made maintaining Ostia difficult, prompting the emperors Claudius and Trajan to establish a new port on the Fiumicino in the first century AD. They built a new road, the Via Portuensis, to connect Rome with Fiumicino, leaving the city by Porta Portese (the port gate). Both ports were eventually abandoned due to silting.

Several popes attempted to improve navigation on the Tiber in the 17th and 18th centuries, with extensive dredging continuing into the 19th century. Trade was boosted for a while, but by the 20th century, silting had resulted in the river only being navigable as far as Rome.

The Tiber was once known for its floods — the Campus Martius is a flood plain and would regularly flood to a depth of 2 m (6 ft 7 in). There were also numerous major floods; for example, on 15 September 1557 the river flooded to a height of 19 m (62 ft) above sea level, over 1,000 people died. The river is now confined between high stone embankments, which were begun in 1876. Within the city, the riverbanks are lined by boulevards known as lungoteveri, streets "along the Tiber".

Because the river is identified with Rome, the terms "swimming the Tiber" or "crossing the Tiber" have come to be the shorthand term for converting to Roman Catholicism. A Catholic who converts to Protestantism, in particular Anglicanism, is referred to as "swimming the Thames" or "crossing the Thames".

In ancient Rome, executed criminals were thrown into the Tiber. People executed at the Gemonian stairs were thrown in the Tiber during the later part of the reign of the emperor Tiberius. This practice continued over the centuries. For example, the corpse of Pope Formosus was thrown into the Tiber after the infamous Cadaver Synod held in 897.

== Bridges ==
In addition to the numerous modern bridges over the Tiber in Rome, there remain a few ancient bridges (now mostly pedestrian-only) that have survived in part (e.g., the Ponte Milvio and the Ponte Sant'Angelo), or in whole (Pons Fabricius).

In addition to bridges, the Metro trains use tunnels.

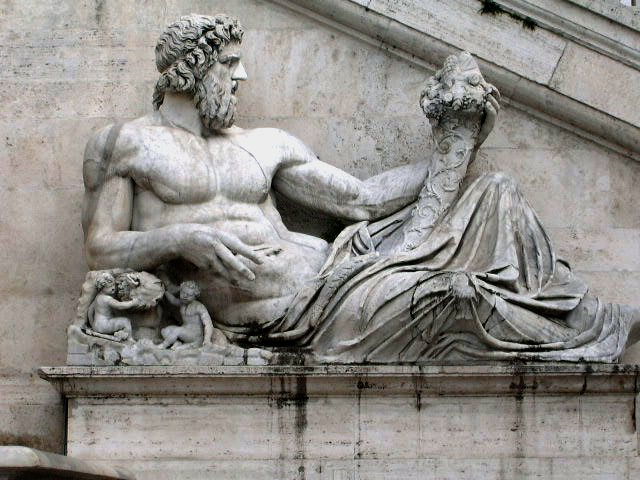
Roman representation of Tiber as a god (Tiberinus) with cornucopia at the Campidoglio, Rome

== Representations ==
Following the standard Roman depiction of rivers as powerfully built reclining male gods, the Tiber, also interpreted as a god named Tiberinus, is shown with streams of water flowing from his hair and beard.

== See also ==
- Hollywood on the Tiber
- Naumachia of Augustus
