= Pons Fabricius =

Ancient Roman bridge in Rome

Pons Fabricius Ponte Fabricio Ponte dei Quattro Capi
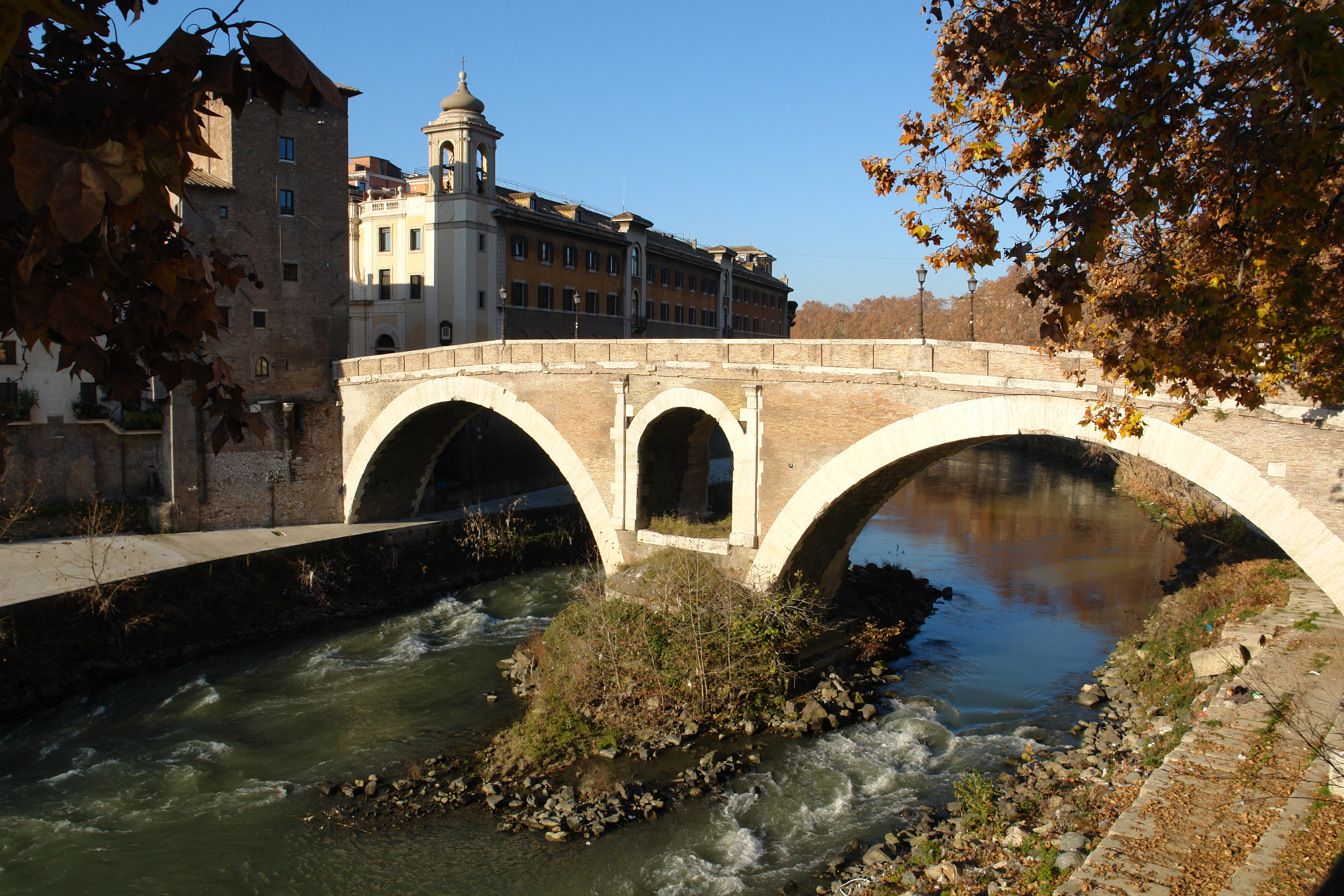
- The Pons Fabricius in 2008
- Coordinates: 41°53′28″N 12°28′42″E
- Carries: Connection Campus Martius-Tiber Island
- Crosses: Tiber
- Locale: Rome, Italy

Characteristics
- Design: Arch bridge
- Material: Stone and rock
- Total length: 62 m (203 ft)
- Width: 5.5 m (18 ft)
- Height: 55.5 feet
- Longest span: 24.5 m (80 ft)
- No. of spans: 2

History
- Construction end: 62 BC

Location
- Click on the map for a fullscreen view

The Pons Fabricius (Italian: Ponte Fabricio, "Fabrician Bridge") or Ponte dei Quattro Capi, is the oldest extant bridge in Rome, Italy. Built in 62 BC, it spans half of the Tiber River, from the Campus Martius on the east side to Tiber Island in the middle (the Pons Cestius is west of the island). Quattro Capi ("four heads") refers to the two marble pillars of the two-faced Janus herms on the parapet, which were moved here from the nearby Church of St Gregory (Monte Savello) in the 14th century.

== Bridge ==
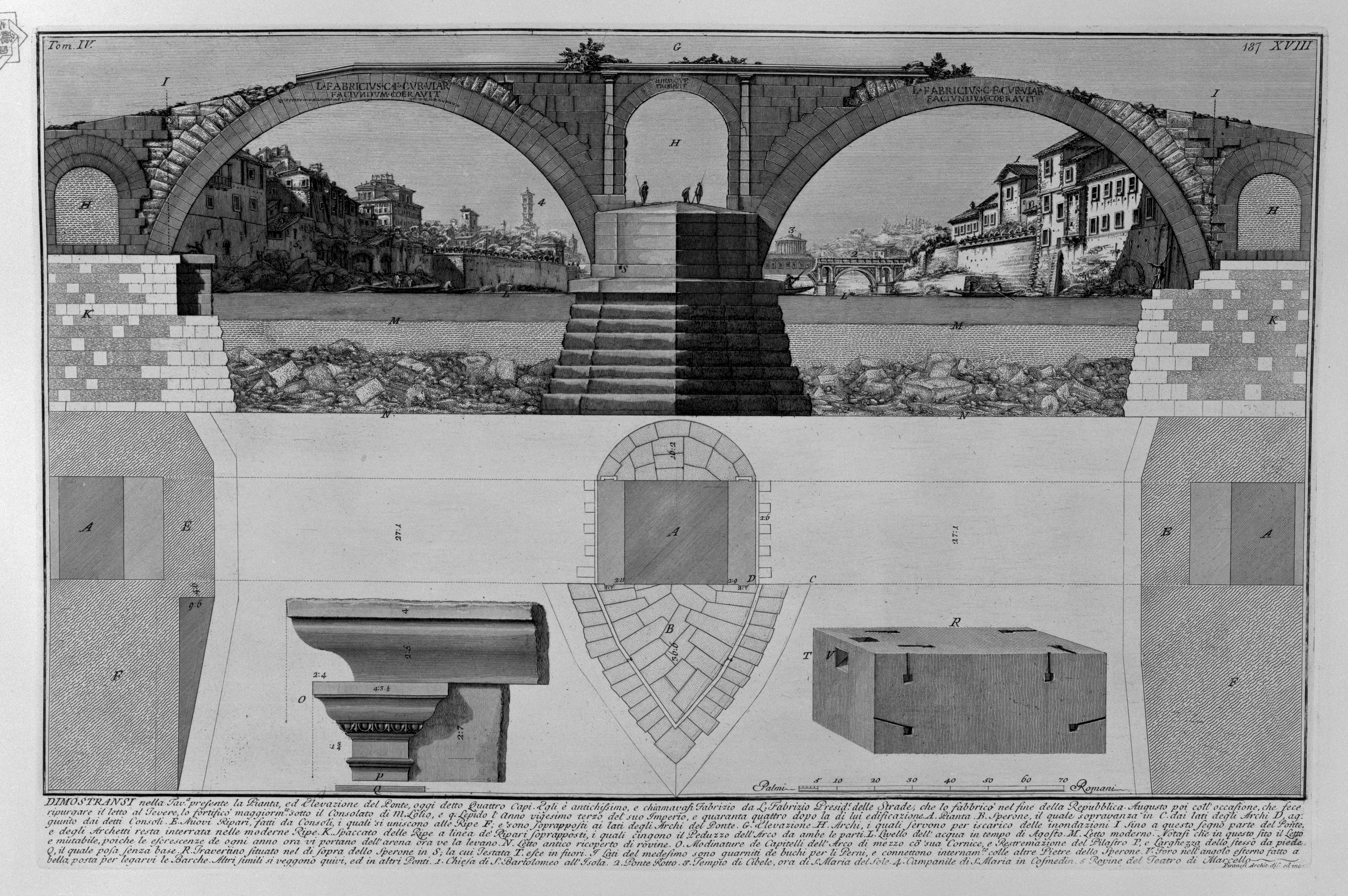
Pons Fabricius as it appears in a Piranesi engraving of 1756

According to Dio Cassius, the bridge was built in 62 BC, the year after Cicero was consul, to replace an earlier wooden bridge destroyed by fire. It was commissioned by Lucius Fabricius, the curator of the roads and a member of the gens Fabricia of Rome. Completely intact from Roman antiquity, it has been in continuous use ever since.

The Pons Fabricius has a length of 62 m, and is 5.5 m wide. It is constructed from two wide arches spanning 24 m (80 ft), supported by a central pillar in the middle of the stream. The arches of this bridge are the first ones on any Roman bridge that were not semi-circular. This is possibly caused by the semi-circle being located below the water line. Its core is constructed of tuff. Its outer facing today is made of bricks and travertine. A relief is located 6 m (20 ft) above the pier. During times of flood, this relief served as an additional waterway.

=== Inscription ===
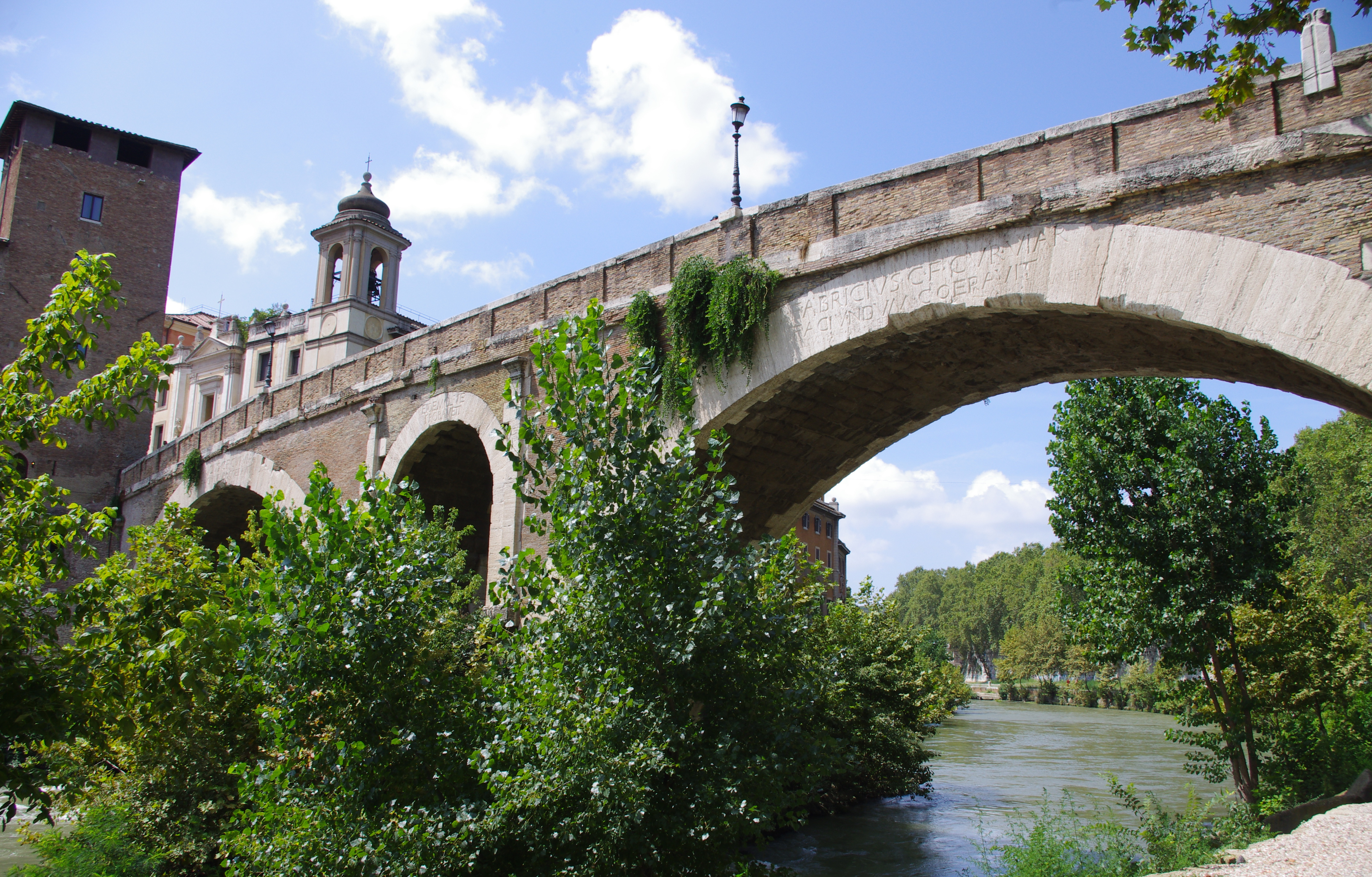
Pons Fabricius and Tiber island as seen from the Tiber river walkway

An original inscription on the travertine commemorates its builder in Latin: L . FABRICIVS . C . F . CVR . VIAR | FACIVNDVM . COERAVIT | IDEMQVE | PROBAVIT ("Lucius Fabricius, son of Gaius, superintendent of the roads, took care and likewise approved that it be built"). It is repeated four times, once on each side of each arch.

A later inscription, in smaller lettering, records that the bridge was restored under Pope Innocent XI, probably in 1679.

== See also ==
- Ponte Milvio – Ancient Roman bridge in Rome
- List of Roman bridges
- List of ancient monuments in Rome
- Roman architecture
- Roman engineering

== Sources ==
- O’Connor, Colin (1993), Roman Bridges, Cambridge University Press, p. 66, ISBN 0-521-39326-4

Preceded by Pons Cestius	Landmarks of Rome; Pons Fabricius	Succeeded by Ponte Milvio
