= Tiber Island =

Island of the Tiber river in Rome, Italy

Tiber Island Isola Tiberina
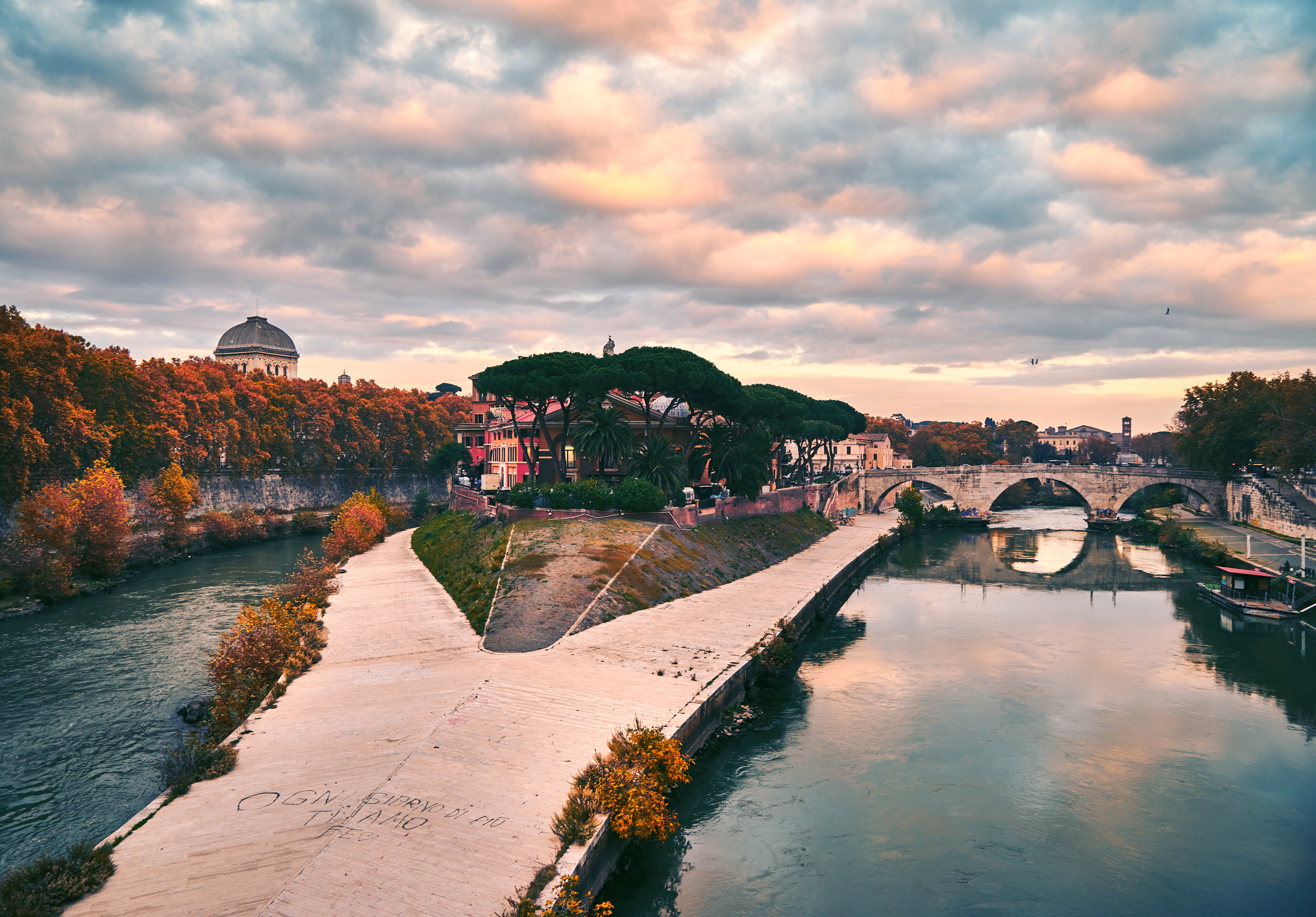
- A view of the Tiber Island.
- Coordinates: 41°53′27″N 12°28′38″E

Location
- Interactive map of Tiber Island

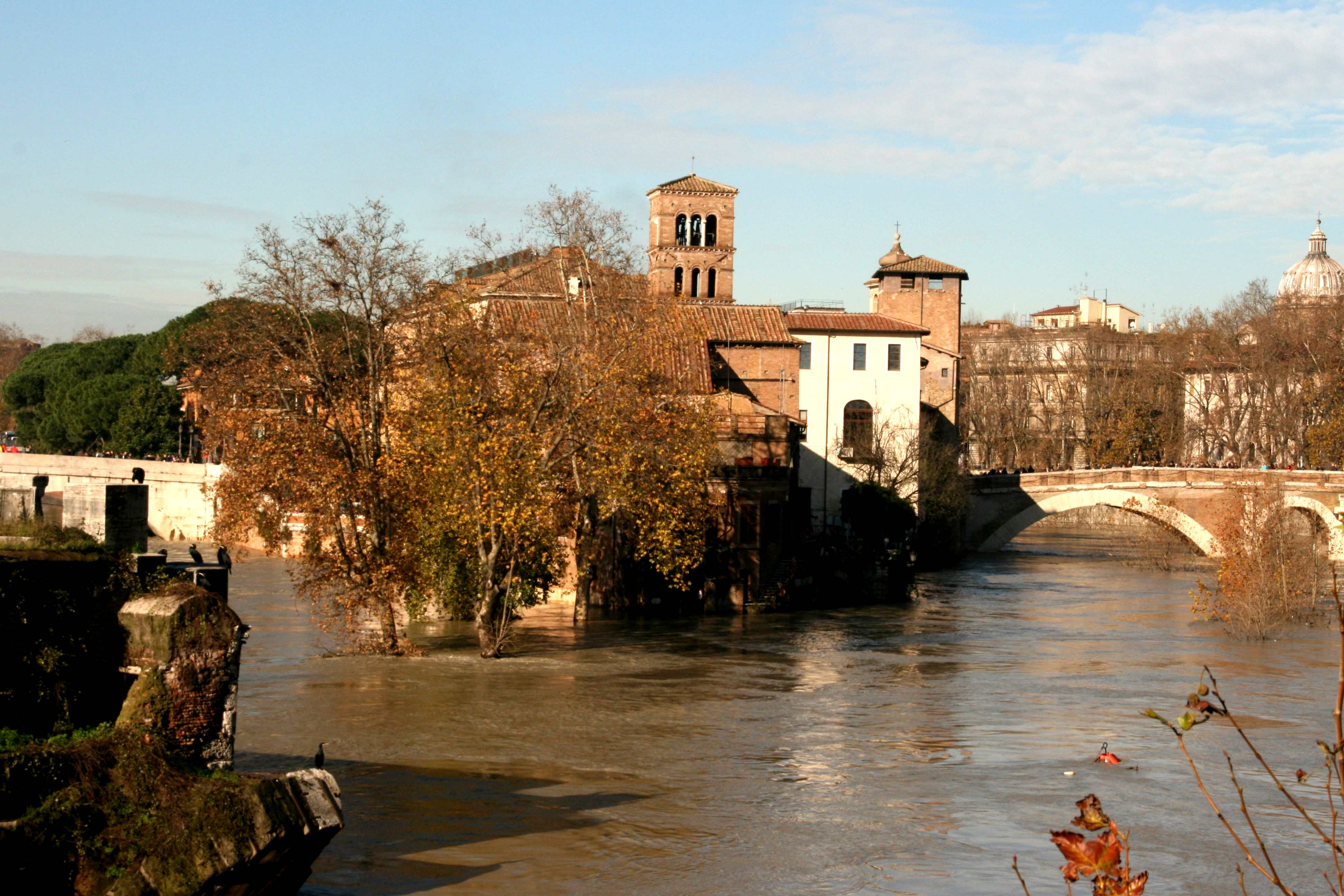
A view on 13 December 2008 when the Tiber reached its highest level in 40 years

The Tiber Island (Italian: Isola Tiberina, Latin: Insula Tiberina) is the only river island in the part of the Tiber which runs through Rome. Tiber Island is located in the southern bend of the Tiber.

The island is boat-shaped, approximately 270 metres (890 feet) long and 67 metres (220 feet) wide, and has been connected with bridges to both sides of the river since antiquity. Being a seat of the ancient temple of Asclepius and later a hospital, the island is associated with medicine and healing. The Fatebenefratelli Hospital founded in the 16th century, and the basilica church of San Bartolomeo all'Isola dating from the 10th century, are located on the island.

== History ==
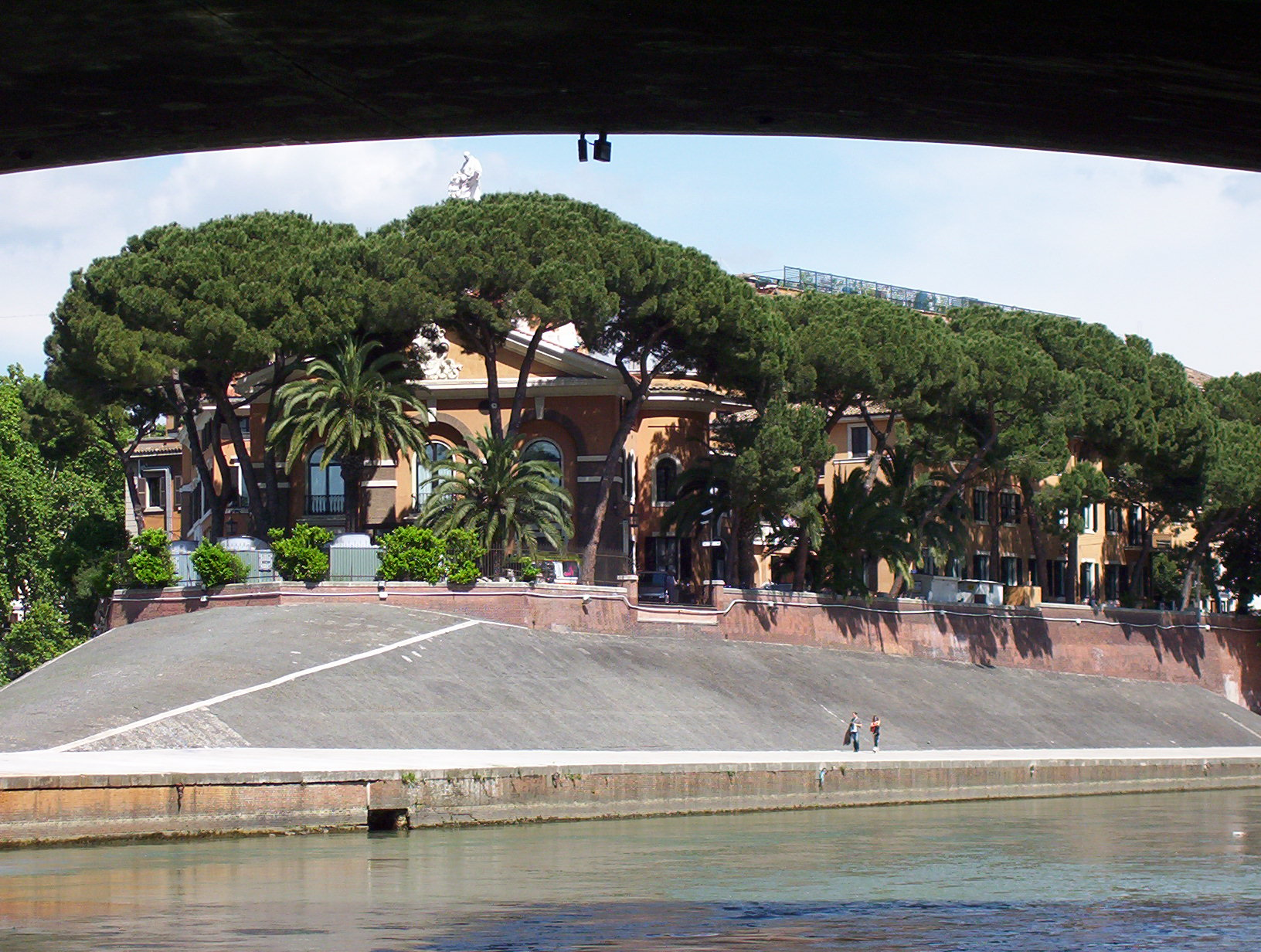
The Western end of Isola Tiberina. The travertine stone gives a distinctive trireme shape.

The island has been linked to the rest of Rome by two bridges since antiquity, and was once called Insula Inter-Duos-Pontes which means "the island between the two bridges". The Ponte Fabricio, the only original bridge in Rome, connects the island from the northeast to the Field of Mars in the rione Sant'Angelo (left bank). The Ponte Cestio, of which only some original parts survived, connects the island to Trastevere on the south (right bank).

There is a legend which says that after the fall of the hated tyrant Tarquinius Superbus (510 BC), the angry Romans threw his body into the Tiber. His body then settled onto the bottom where dirt and silt accumulated around it and eventually formed Tiber Island. Another version of the legend says that the people gathered up the wheat and grain of their despised ruler and threw it into the Tiber, where it eventually became the foundation of the island.

Prior to the 3rd century BC, Roman use of the island is not mentioned by any sources.

=== Temple of Aesculapius (3rd century BC) ===
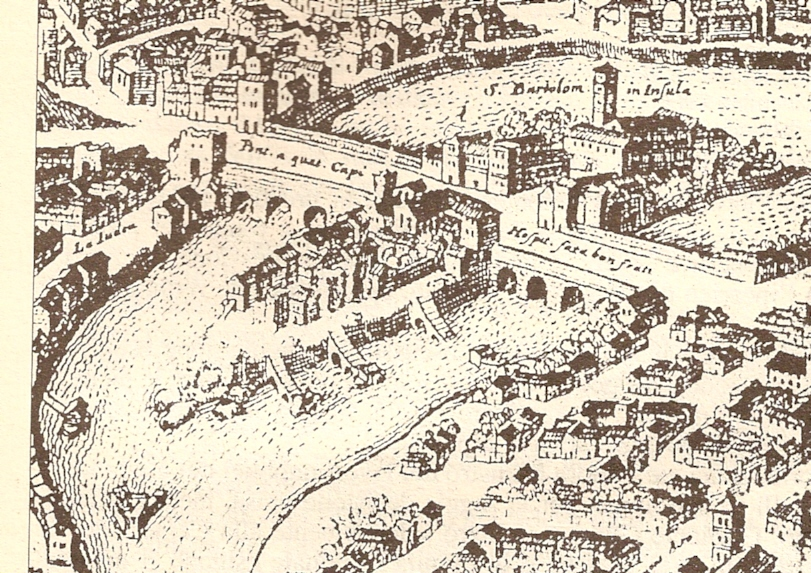
An illustration of the Tiber Island in a 1593 print.

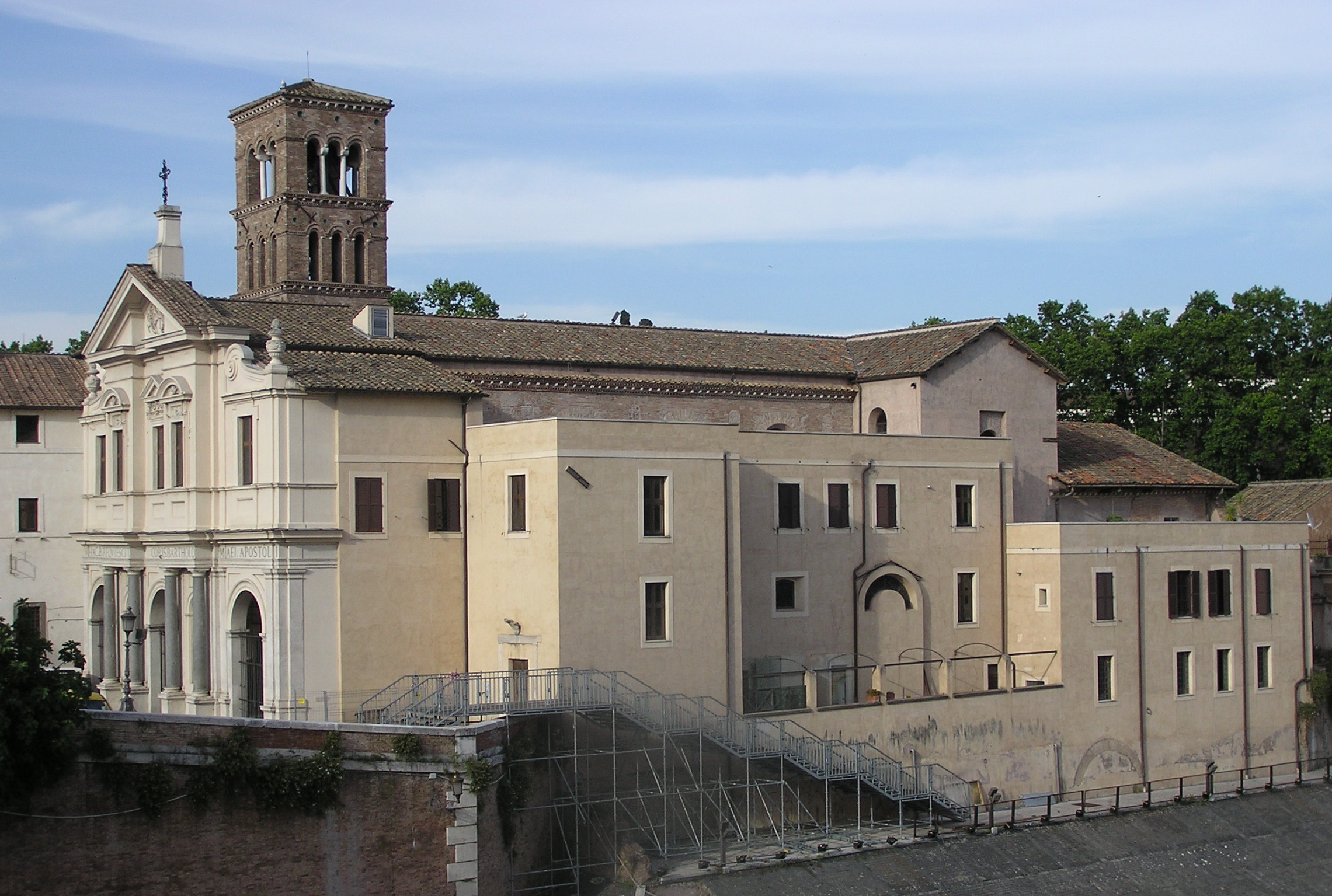
The Basilica di San Bartolomeo all'Isola on Tiber Island.

Tiber Island was once the location of an ancient temple to Aesculapius, the Greek god of medicine and healing. In 293 BC, there was a great plague in Rome. Upon consulting the Sibyl, the Roman Senate was instructed to build a temple to Aesculapius, the Greek god of healing, and sent a delegation to Epidauros to obtain a statue of the deity. The delegation went on board a ship to sail out and obtain a statue.

Following their belief system, they obtained a snake, closely associated and dear to the god, from a temple and put it on board their ship. It immediately curled itself around the ship's mast and this was deemed as a good sign by them. Upon their return up the Tiber river, the snake slithered off the ship and swam onto the island. Believing this was an incarnation of the god himself, a temple to Aesculapius was erected just where the serpent landed.

The island may have been chosen as the site for the temple to distance it from the rest of the city, as well as for access to flowing water for use in the temple.

The island eventually became so identified with the temple it supported that it was modeled to resemble a ship in reference to the story of the temple's founding. Travertine facing was added in mid or late first century by the banks to resemble a ship's prow and stern, and an obelisk was erected in the middle, symbolizing the vessel's mast. Walls were put around the island, and it came to resemble a Roman ship. Faint vestiges of Aesculapius' rod with an entwining snake are still visible on the "prow".

==== Additional Roman shrines ====
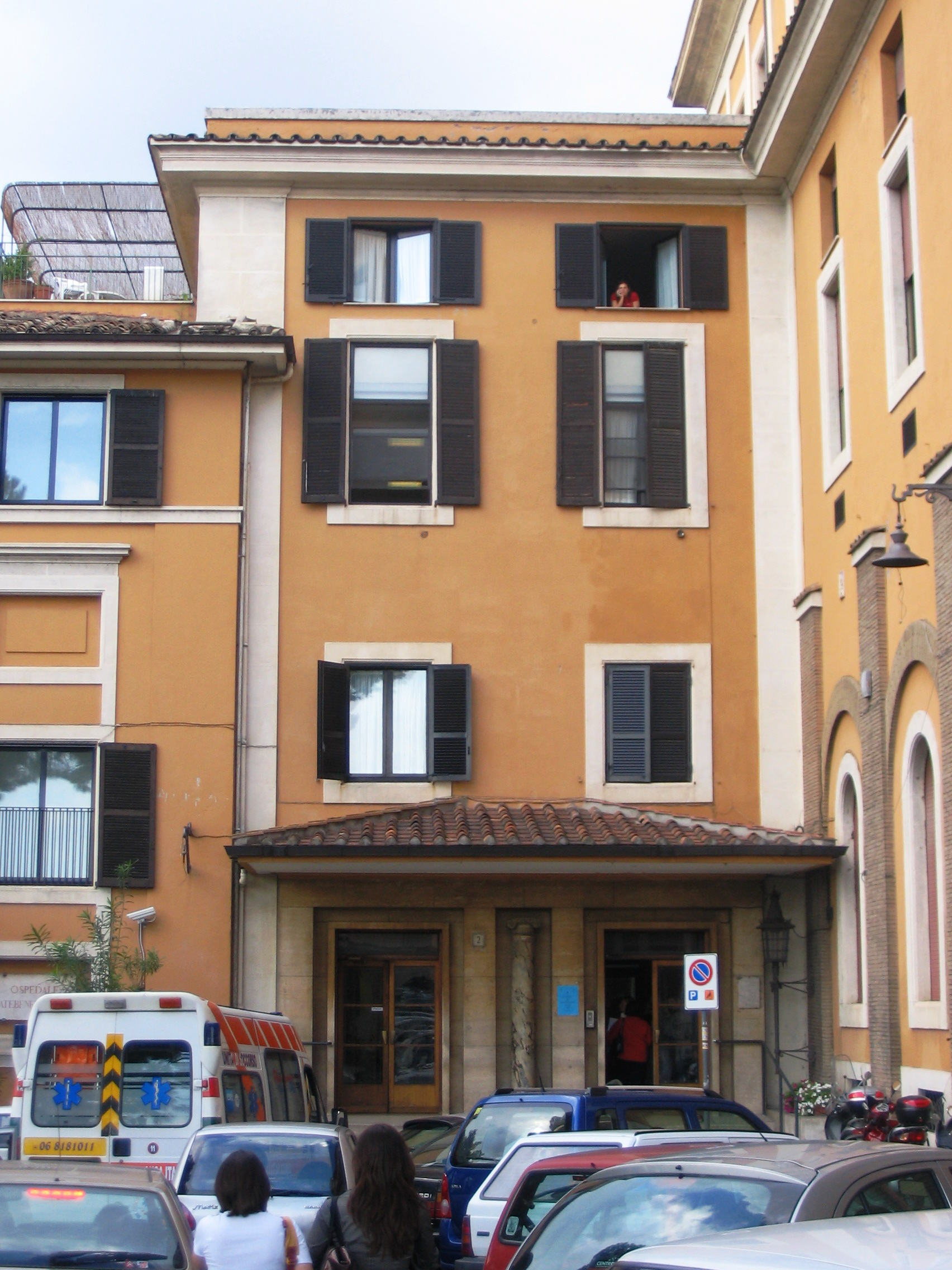
Entrance of the Fatebenefratelli Hospital (Ospedale Fatebenefratelli)

After the Temple of Aesculapius, shrines dedicated to other deities were also erected after the 2nd century BC, namely:

- Jupiter Jurarius ("guarantor of oaths")
- Semo Sancus Dius Fidius, also a witness of oath
- Gaia, yet another witness of oath
- Faunus, boundary deity
- Vejovis, god of healing
- Tiberinus, river god
- Bellona, war goddess

=== After Ancient Rome ===
In time, the obelisk was removed and replaced with a cross-topped column. After it was destroyed in 1867, Pope Pius IX had an aedicula, called "Spire", put in its place. This monument, designed by Ignazio Jacometti, is decorated with statues of four saints related to the island: St. Bartholomew the Apostle, St. Paulinus of Nola, St. Francis of Assisi and St. John of God. Parts of the obelisk are now in the museum in Naples.

In 998 Emperor Otto III had a basilica, that of San Bartolomeo all'Isola, built over the Aesculapius temple's ruins on the eastern side (downstream end) of the island. This was dedicated to his friend, the martyr Adalbert of Prague; the name of St. Bartholomew was added only later. In the early 20th century, prior to the Fascist regime's restoration of ancient place names, the Tiber Island was called the Isola di S. Bartolomeo. Likewise, Cestius' Bridge was called the Ponte S. Bartolomeo.

The island is still considered a place of healing because a hospital, founded in 1584, was built on the island and is still operating. It is staffed by the Hospitaller Order of St. John of God or "Fatebenefratelli". The hospital was not built on the same spot as the temple, but stands on the western half of the island.

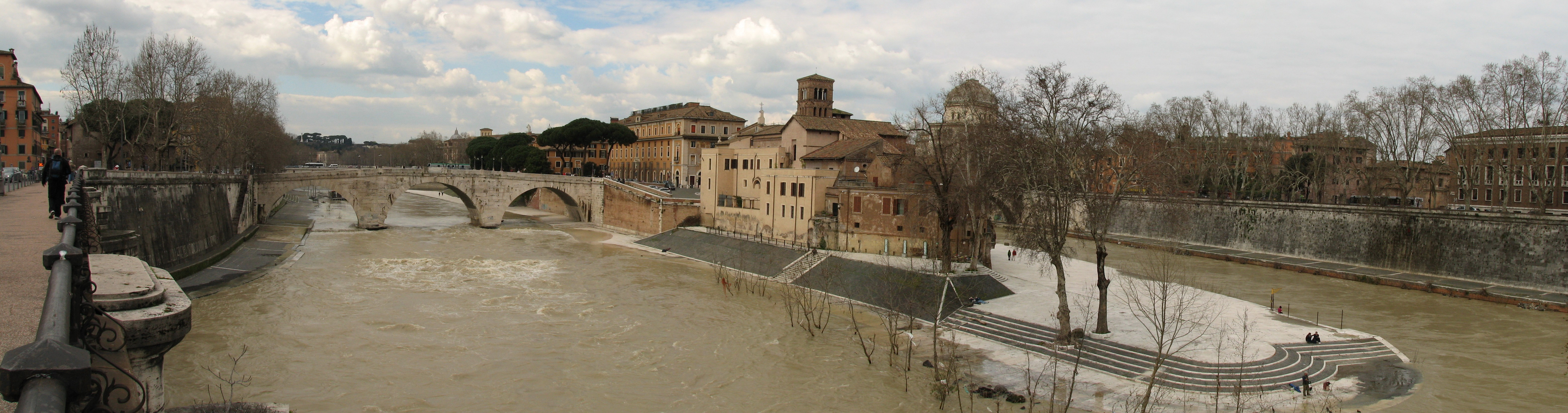
Panoramic view of the island with the Ponte Cestio

During the 1930s, almost all the houses on the island were demolished to allow for the enlargement of the hospital.

During WWII, when the Nazis occupied Rome in September 1943 and started rounding up the Jews, Dr. Borromeo, head of the hospital, invented an imaginary deadly and highly contagious illness he dubbed “Il Morbo di K” to keep the SS away and protect those Jews hiding inside the wards, just a stone's throw from the Ghetto.

== Festivals ==
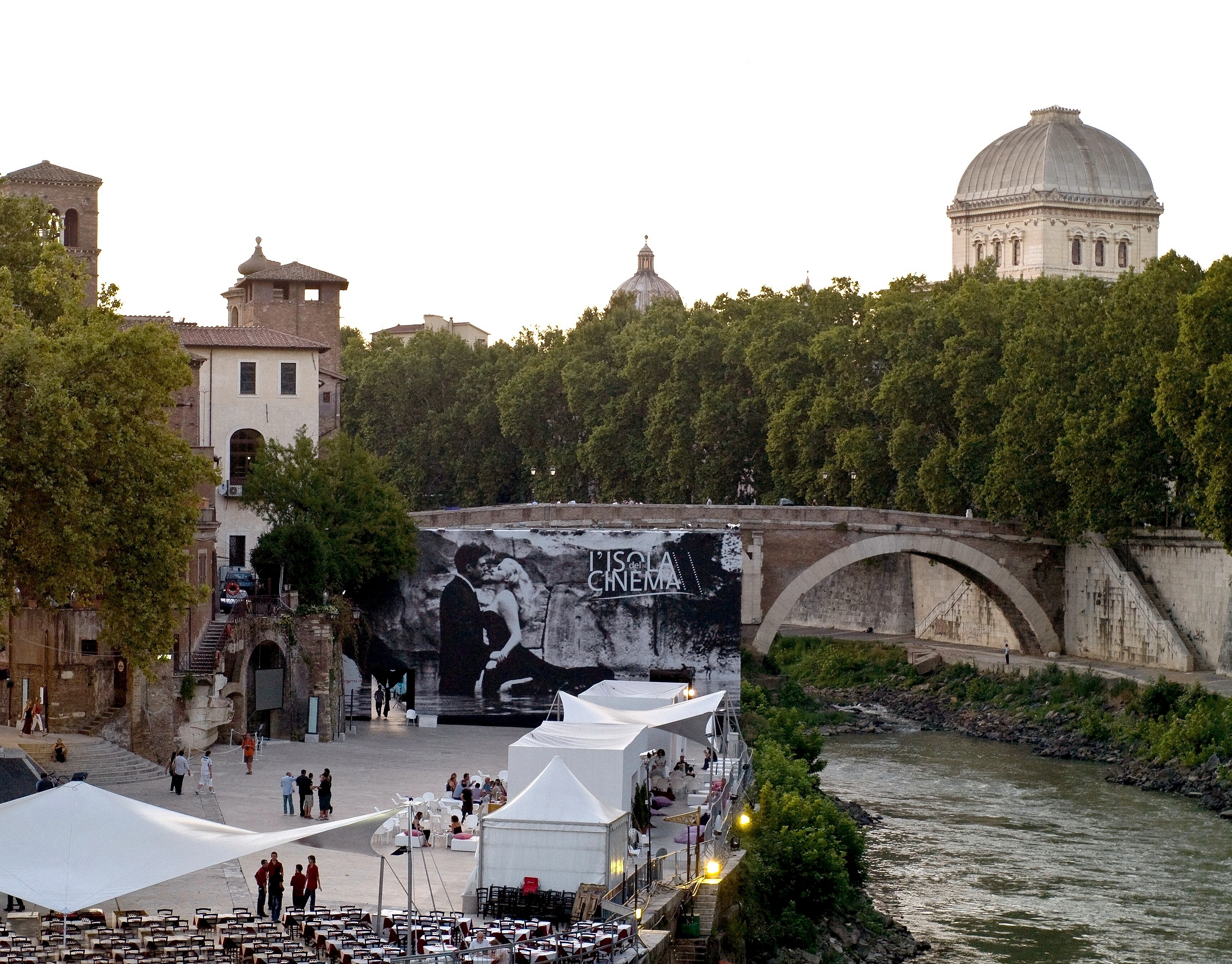
L'Isola del Cinema, 2009

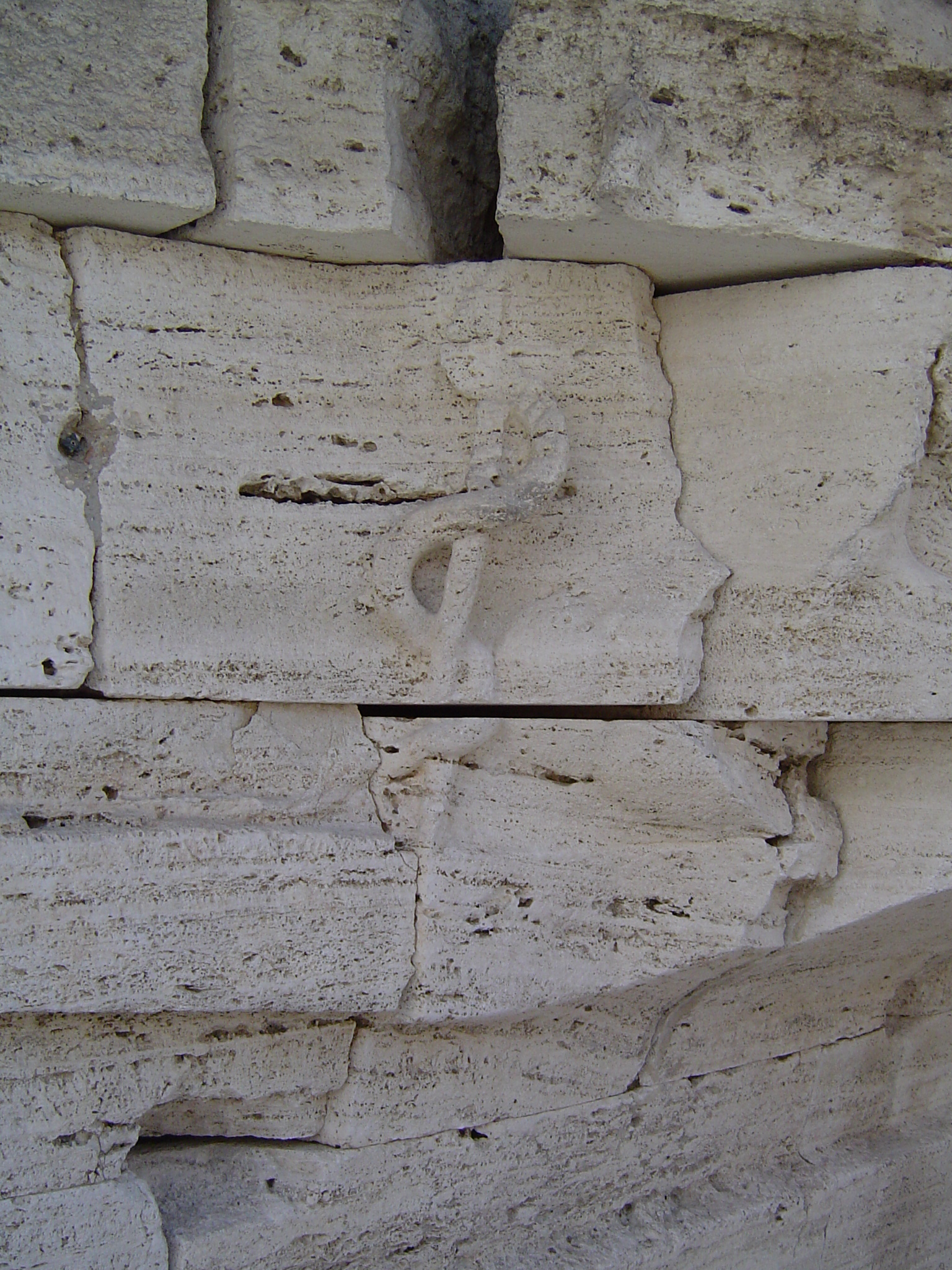
Carving of the rod of Aesculapius on the stone prow of Tiber Island

During summer, the island hosts the Isola del Cinema film festival.

== Popular culture ==
The island serves as the player's headquarters in the 2010 action-adventure stealth video game Assassin's Creed: Brotherhood.
