= Lungotevere Tor di Nona =

- Interactive map of Lungotevere Tor di Nona
- Namesake: Turris de Annona (medieval tower)
- Type: Lungotevere
- Location: Rome, Italy
- Quarter: Ponte
- Coordinates: 41.9014°N 12.4703°E
- From: Piazza di Ponte Sant'Angelo
- To: Piazza di Ponte Umberto I

Construction
- Inauguration: July 20, 1887

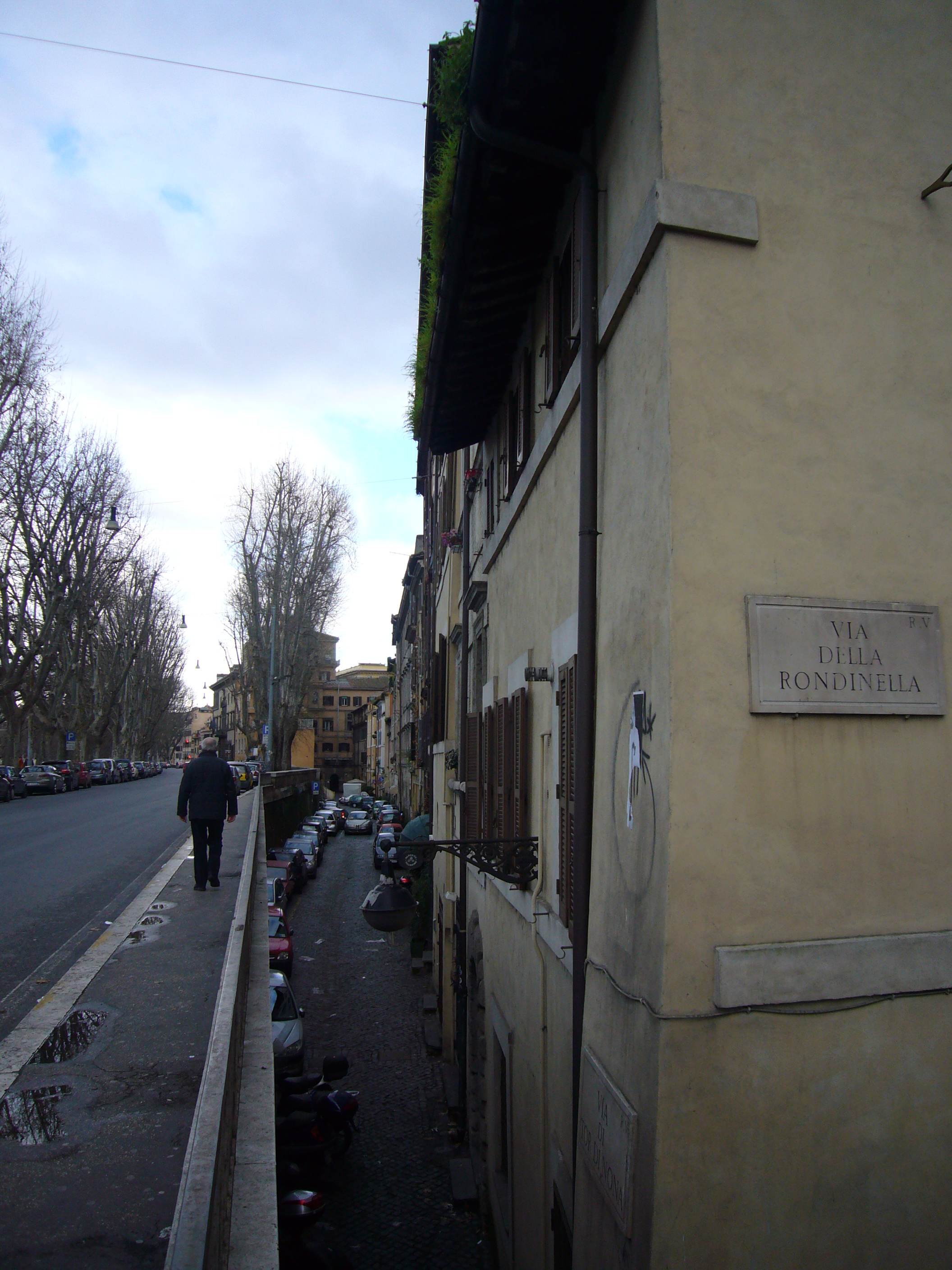
Lungotevere Tor di Nona. Below, the remains of via di Tor di Nona

Lungotevere Tor di Nona is the stretch of Lungotevere that connects Piazza di Ponte Sant'Angelo to Piazza di Ponte Umberto I in Rome, in the rione Ponte. It was named so following the resolution of the city council of 20 July 1887.

== History ==
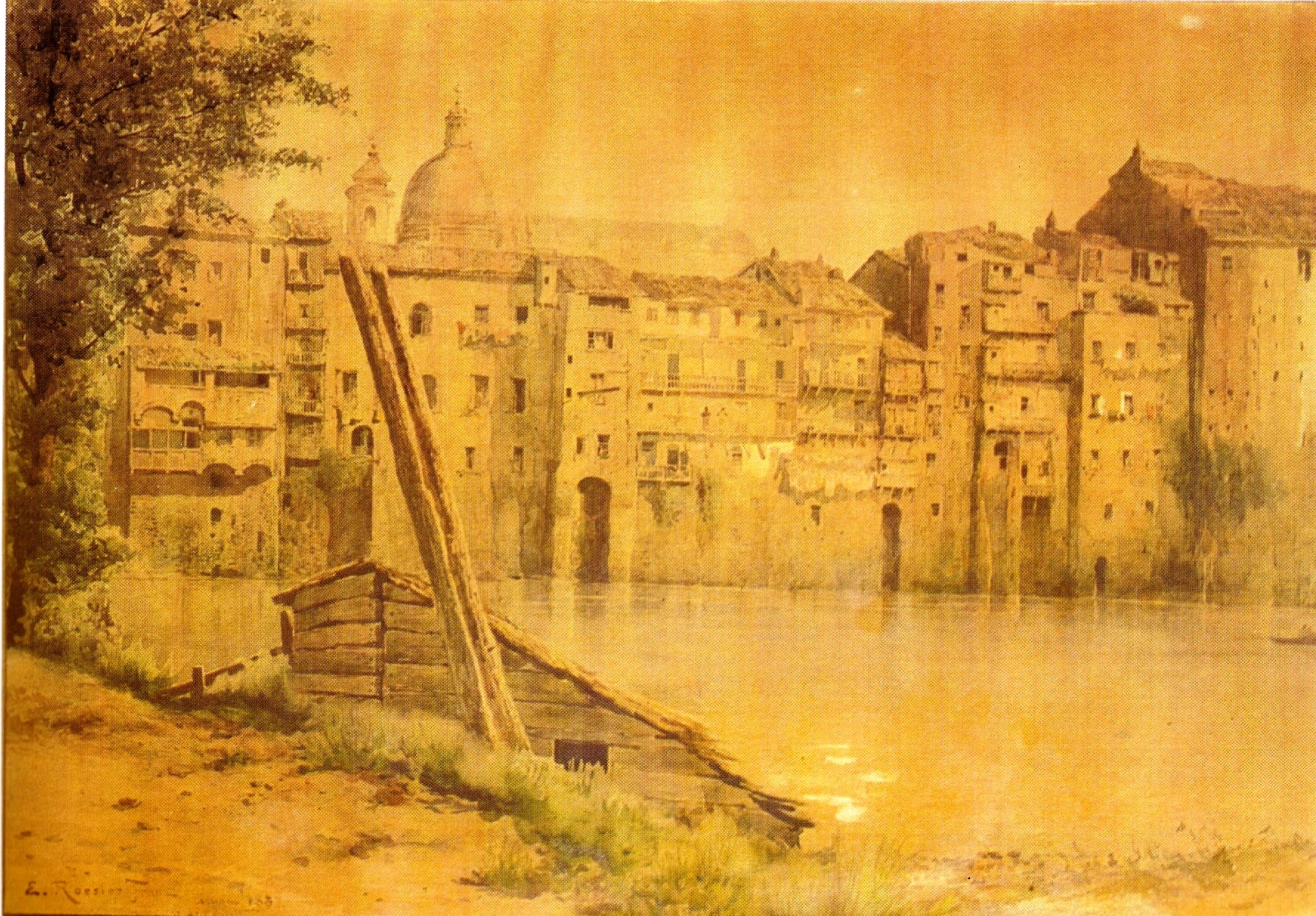
Houses in Tor di Nona c. 1880, watercolour by Ettore Roesler Franz

The Lungotevere runs against the Via di Tor di Nona, a riverside path already present in the ancient Roman road system. To river activities was clearly tied a more ancient pier-dock built before the construction of the walls, probably destined, in the age of Hadrian, to the unloading of marbles for the imperial mausoleum.

After the construction of the Aurelian Walls along the left bank of the Tiber, in which were opened several posterulae intended for river traffic, the route followed the walls' path. Roman remains of the pier were still visible at the time of 18th century engraver Giovanni Battista Piranesi and were well sketched by him, although interpreted as "Remains of the Triumphal Bridge".

In the Middle Ages the street was named after the medieval Turris de Annona, a building so named because of its use as grain storeroom: before that, the tower had been a possession of the aristocratic Orsini family, and was used as prison from the 15th century to 1660.

For the construction of the lungotevere most of the ancient street was demolished, including a building initially belonged to the Farnese family and, after 1550, to the Caetani, where often Pope Julius III lived (the building was leveled to make way for the head of the Umberto I Bridge and the square bearing the same name); of the ancient street have survived some houses, having now the Lungotevere at the height of their first floor.

In September 1889 was also demolished the theater Apollo a Tordinona, built in 1670 and designed by Carlo Fontana, who reused the abandoned prison: the building today is remembered by a marble stele designed by Cesare Bazzani.

== Bibliografia ==
- Lorenzo Bianchi, Case e torri medioevali a Roma, L'Erma di Bretschneider, 1998. About Tor di Nona, see chapt. 6 "Un isolato medioevale a Tor di Nona", pp. 343–407.
- Rendina, Claudio; Paradisi, Donatella (2004). Le strade di Roma. 3rd volume P-Z. Newton Compton Editori, Rome. ISBN 88-541-0209-1.
