= Lucenti =

Lucenti is an Italian surname. Notable people with the surname include:

- Emmanuel Lucenti (born 1984), Argentine judoka
- Giorgio Lucenti (born 1975), Italian footballer
- Gaetano Lucenti, Italian footballer
- Girolamo Lucenti (1627–1692), Italian sculptor
- Matteo Lucenti (born 1992), Italian footballer
- Rodrigo Lucenti (born 1978), Argentine judoka
