= Lungotevere degli Altoviti =

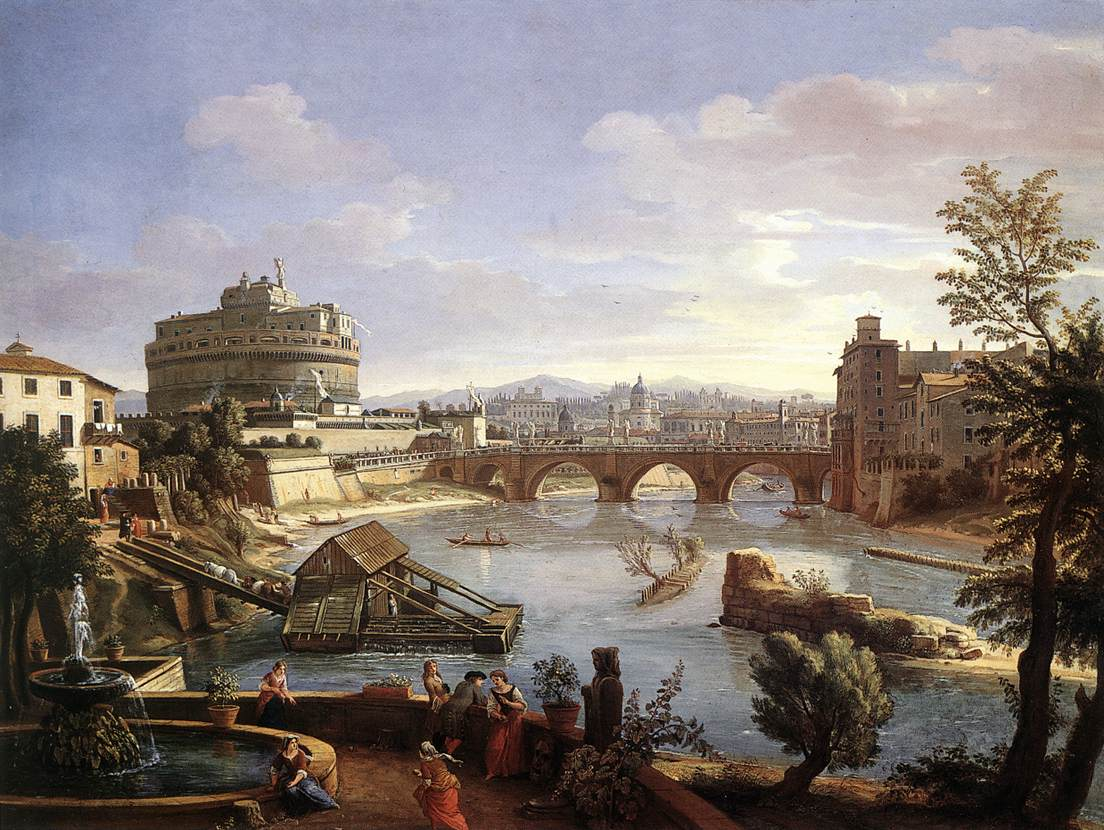
Palazzo Altoviti (right)

Lungotevere degli Altoviti is the stretch of Lungotevere that connects Piazza di Ponte Sant'Angelo to Piazza Paquale Paoli, in Rome, in the rione Ponte.

The Lungotevere is named after the noble Florentine Altoviti family, who moved into this area because it was a place populated by Tuscans. At first, it was called Lungotevere Elio. During the construction of the Lungotevere, the palace Altoviti was demolished, the residence of the family, built in 1514. Very little of the building was saved; remaining is a ceiling currently placed in Palazzo Venezia. The palace was the birthplace, in 1751, of Ennio Quirino Visconti.

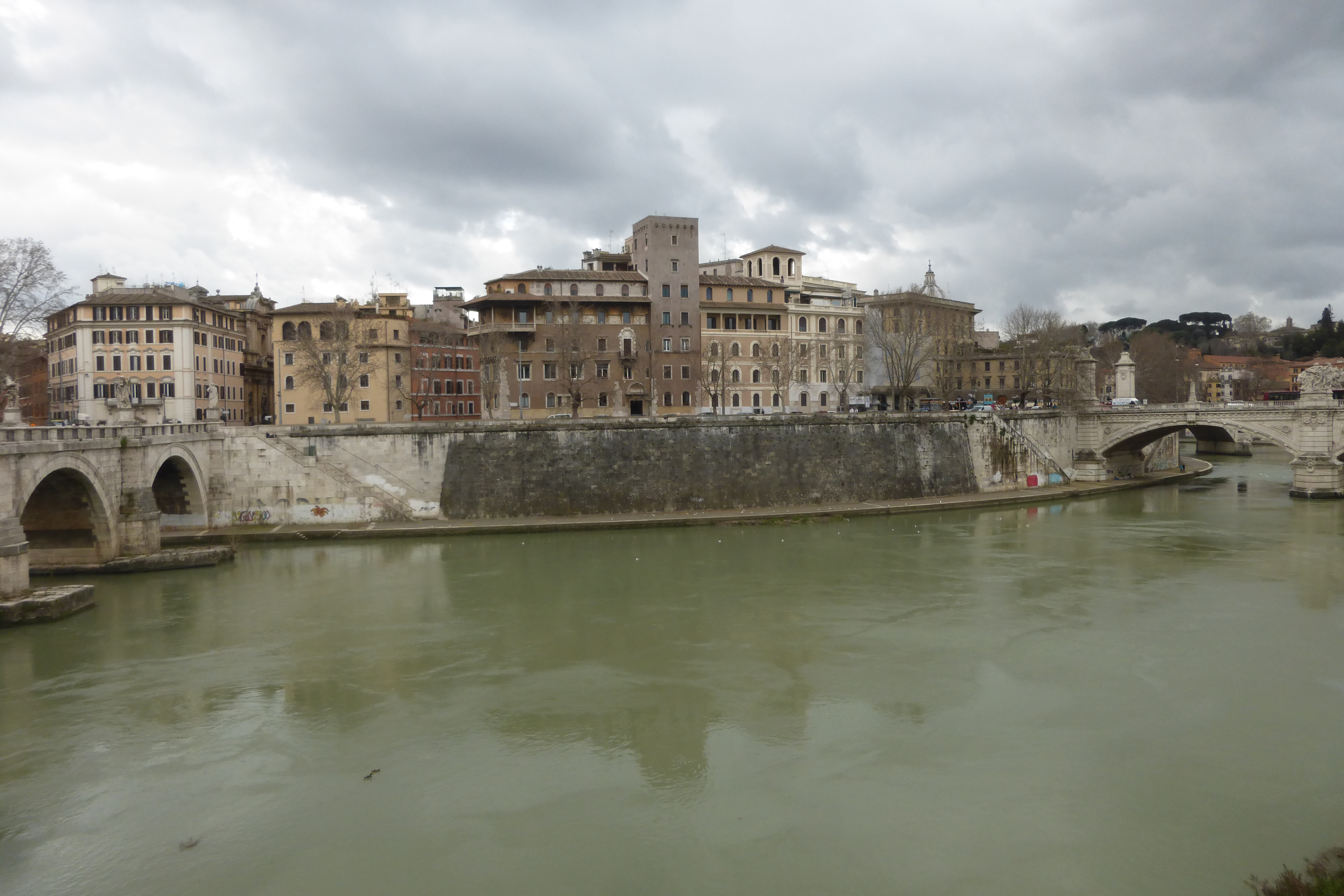
Lungotevere degli Altoviti
