= Columna Lactaria =

Landmark in ancient Rome

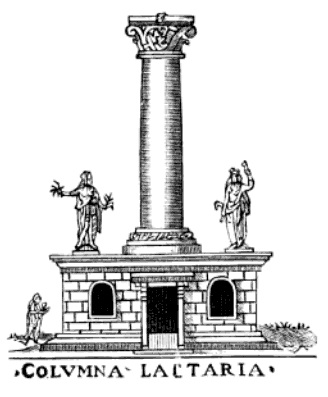
A highly conjectural drawing of the Columna Lactaria by the Italian antiquarian Bartolomeo Marliani (1488–1566)

The Columna Lactaria ("Milk Column") was a landmark in ancient Rome in the Forum Holitorium, or produce market. The Roman grammarian Festus says it was so called "because they would bring babies there to be fed with milk." It seems to have been a public charity where poor parents could obtain milk for their infants, or a central site for locating and hiring wet nurses. It has also been interpreted as a sanctioned site of child abandonment, where parents unable or unwilling to care for newborns could leave the child in the hope that it might be pitied and fostered (that is, given milk).

The Columna Lactaria was located close to the Temple of Pietas, which displayed a painting on the theme of Caritas Romana ("Roman Charity"), about a woman giving breastmilk to an aged parent. The column was probably destroyed by the construction of the Theater of Marcellus, beginning in the 40s BC.

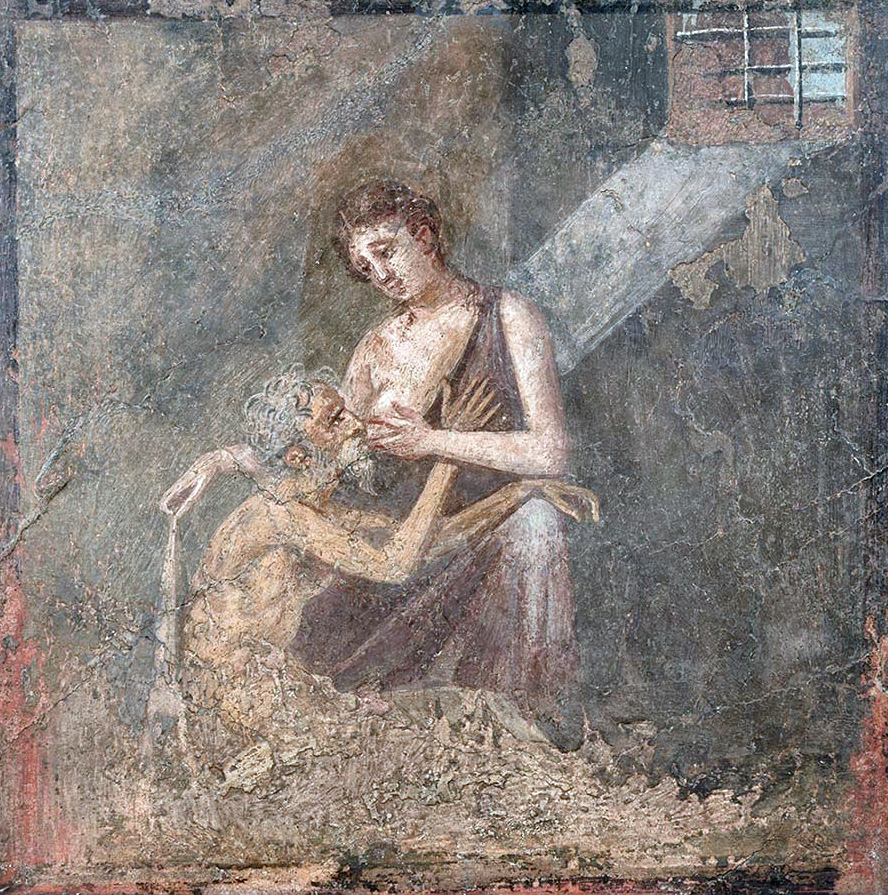
A Pompeiian version of Caritas Romana

One of the neighborhoods razed for the construction of the theater was the Vicus Sobrius, where the residents offered libations of milk to a Punic god Romanized as Mercurius Sobrius. This community may have maintained the Columna Lactaria; Robert E.A. Palmer thought that the milk-offerings of Punic cult might shed light on the significance of the column. Into the early 20th century, the piazza Montanara adjacent to the theater continued to be a place where wet nurses could be sought for hire.
