= Via dei Coronari =

Street in Rome, Italy

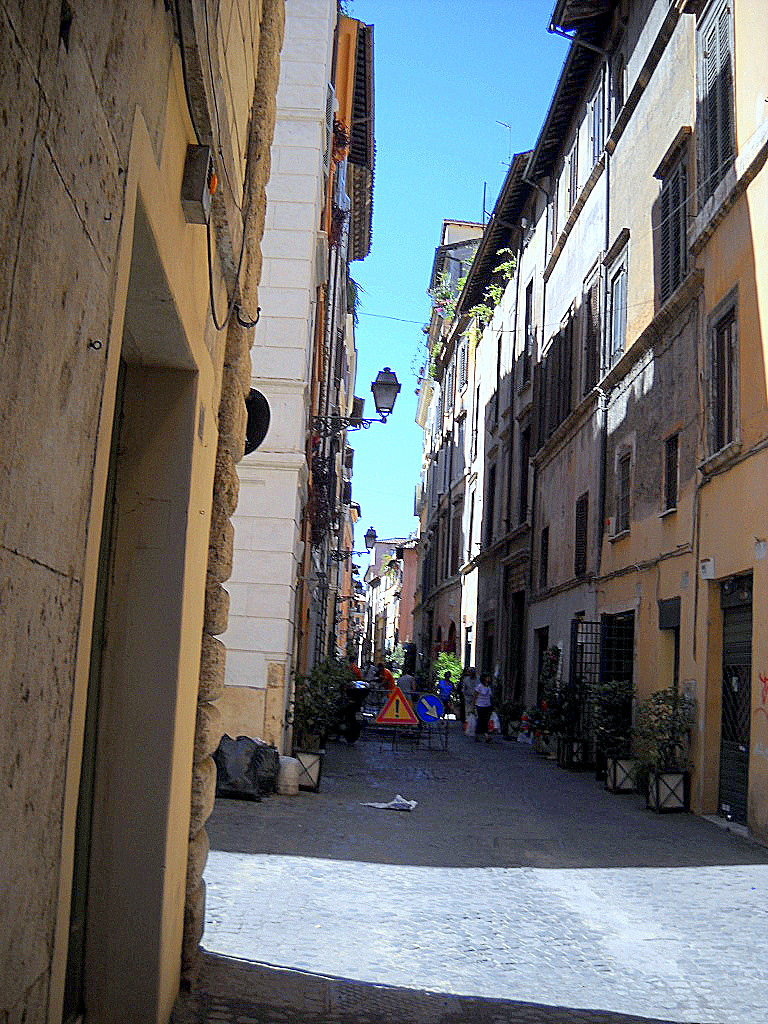
- Via dei Coronari
- Interactive map of Via dei Coronari
- Location: Rome, Italy
- Coordinates: 41°54′2″N 12°28′8″E

Via dei Coronari, nicknamed I Coronari, is a street in the historic center of Rome. The road, flanked by buildings mostly erected in the 15th and the 16th century, lies in the rione Ponte and is one of the most picturesque roads of the old city, having maintained the character of an Italian Renaissance street.

== Location ==
It is about 500m long and runs East-West, between the Largo di Tor Sanguigna and the Piazza dei Coronari. From there the Vicolo del Curato is its west extension. Behind Tor Sanguigna the straight path continues east, passing under a scenic arch into Via di S. Agostino and Via delle Coppelle. The continuity between Via dei Coronari and the latter roads was destroyed in the 1910s through the opening of Via Zanardelli.

Via dei Coronari forms the south border of the neighborhood of Tor di Nona: to the southwest it laps the small hill named Monte Giordano, topped by the Palazzo Taverna.

== History ==
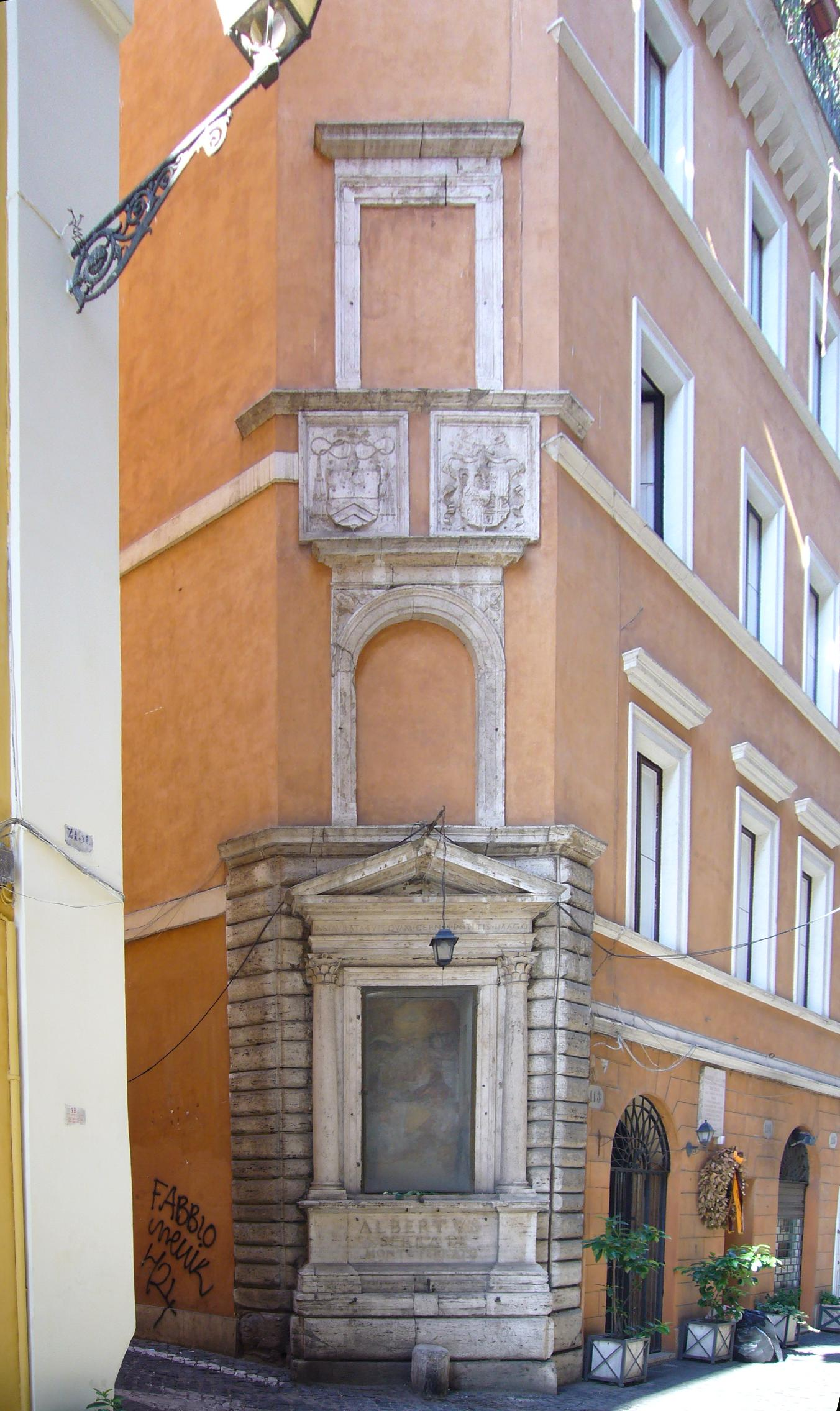
The Immagine di Ponte

The road existed already in the Roman age, when it was part of the straight road correspondent to the modern axis Via delle Coppelle – Via dei Coronari, known under the arbitrary name of Via recta ("straight road").

The street name comes from the Coronari: these, also named Paternostrari, were the sellers of rosary beads ("corone" in Italian), holy miniatures and other holy objects; they had their shops along the road, strategically situated, since the way, leading to the Pons Aelius, was part of the itinerary to the Basilica of St. Peter along which walked the majority of pilgrims, entering Rome from the Porta del Popolo.

During the middle Ages, the road linked two different neighbourhoods; to the east lay the Scorticlaria, (a toponym used between the 10th and the 15th century, which during the Middle Ages became also part of the rione's name: Ponti et Scorticlarorum) so called because of the many dealers there in leather (Latin: scortum) goods; to the West lay the neighborhood Immagine di Ponte (the "image of the Rione Ponte"), named after a wayside shrine rebuilt in the 16th century on a corner of Palazzo Serra and still in place. This was commissioned by Protonotary apostolic Alberto Serra di Monferrato to Antonio da Sangallo the Younger.

During the Renaissance, the street was smoothed and paved by pope Sixtus IV (r. 1471–84). As in other roads of the city, the pope ordered that all the porticoes which flanked the street be walled up, consequently the street lost its medieval character. High prelates, nobles and merchants, attracted by the fiscal advantages promised by the pope to those who had built there, erected their elegant houses and palaces here, whose façades were often adorned with sgraffito paintings, most of which are now faded away. Many houses bore (and some still bear) mottos incised in marble plaques, which give us a hint of the owner's philosophy of life.

In the same period, the neighborhood became home to several decent prostitutes, the cortigiane, highly educated women who were lovers of prelates and aristocrats: among them was Fiammetta Michaelis (the lover of Cesare Borgia), whose home still exists in the part of the street west of S. Salvatore in Lauro.

After the Renaissance, the street and its surroundings decayed. The well-off moved from the Renaissance quarter further north to the rione Campo Marzio, in the zone of Piazza di Spagna.

After the Italian conquest of Rome in 1870, there was a project to enlarge the road, but the mayor of Rome of that time, Ernesto Nathan, canceled it.

The road has been largely spared the demolitions which affected central Rome in the Fascist period. Nevertheless, in 1939, because of the policy of diradamento ("thinning"), carried out by the city government in the old center, which envisaged the destruction of single blocks in order to lower the population density, the street lost its unity because of demolitions north of the church of San Salvatore in Lauro and near Via Vecchiarelli.

Starting with the 1950s, the shops of the road were occupied by many junk-dealers, which with time became antique dealers, transforming the road into one of the three centers of art commerce in Rome, together with Via Giulia and Via del Babuino. Since the 2000s, many of these shops have been substituted with others, like pizzerias, gelaterias and souvenir sellers, servicing tourists en route to St. Peter.

== Notable buildings and landmarks ==
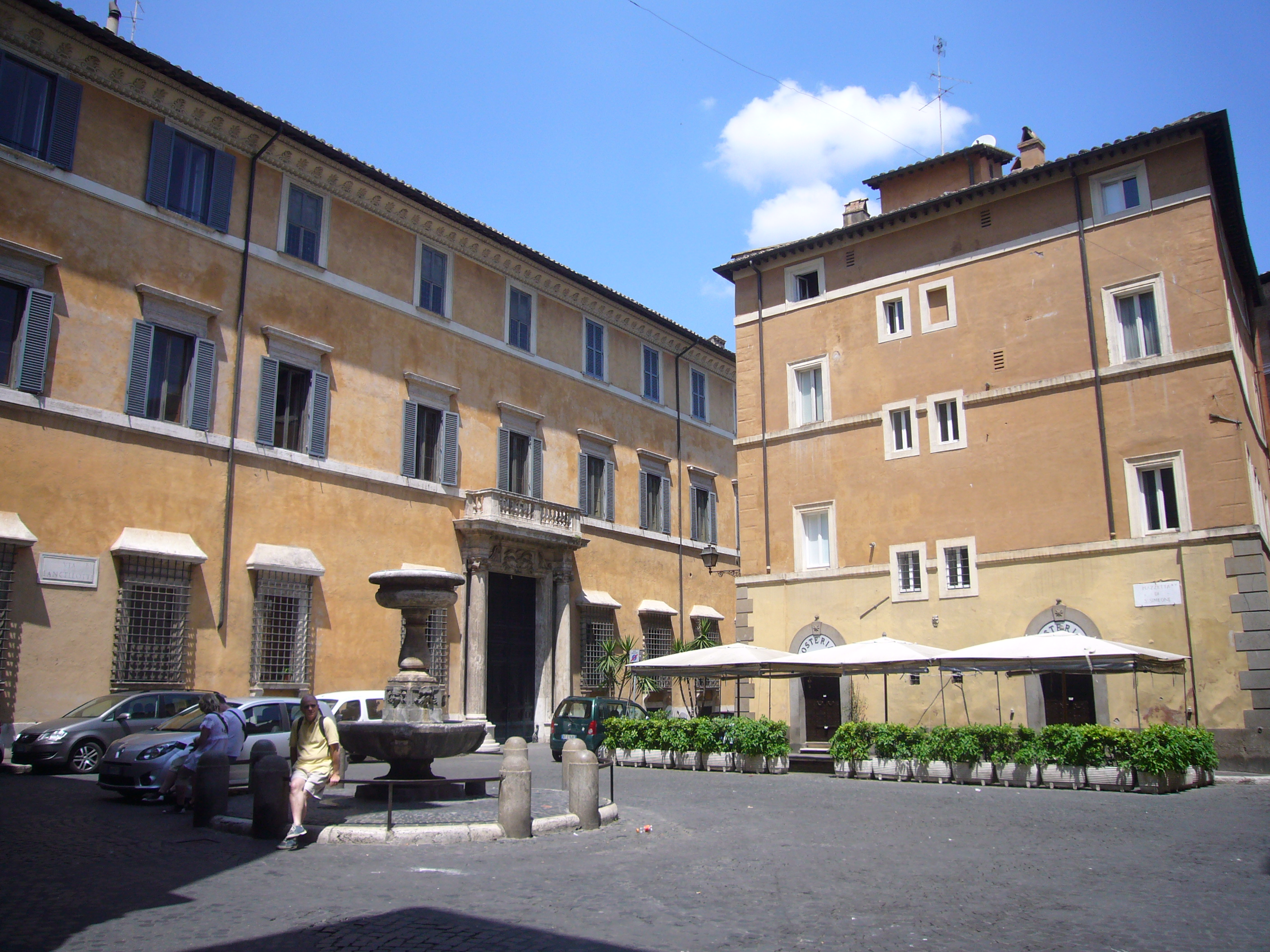
Palazzo Lancellotti (to the left), with the fountain from Piazza Montanara placed at the center of the Piazzetta di S. Simeone

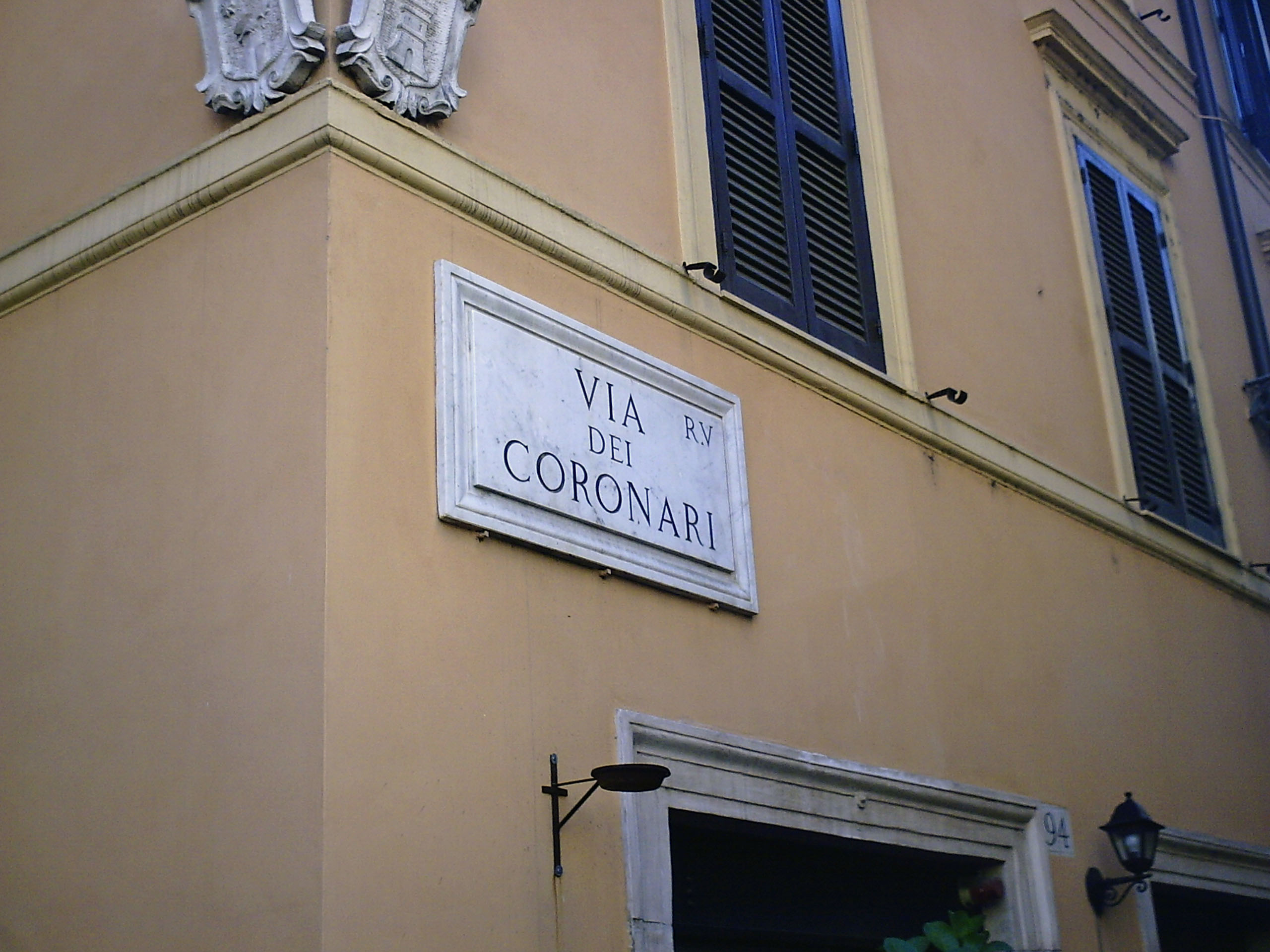
Marble plaque with the road's name

- Palazzo Lancellotti. The Lancellotti are a noble Roman family, originating from Sicily. They belong to the nobiltà nera ("black nobility") which have remained faithful to the pope after the Italian conquest of Rome in 1870. To show their fidelity, the door of the palace on the piazza di San Simeone has remained closed since that day. The building was designed by Francesco Capriani da Volterra around the middle of the 16th century, and finished by Carlo Maderno. The doorway enframement was designed by Domenichino.
- Palazzo del Drago, a noble family originating from Viterbo, erected around the middle of the 16th century;
- Palazzo dell'antico Monte di Pietà, rebuilt in 1785. The Roman Mount of Piety was founded in 1585 by Pope Sixtus V (r. 1585–90), who bought at his own expense a house here.
- Vicolo di S. Trifone, Rome's narrowest lane;
- Fountain of Piazzetta di S. Simeone, in front of Palazzo Lancellotti, originally erected in Piazza Montanara in rione Campitelli (destroyed in the 1920s) and brought here in 1973;
- Church of S. Salvatore in Lauro dei Piceni, the national church of the immigrants from Marche in Rome;
- Church of Santi Simone e Giuda, at the top of a high stair climbing Monte Giordano: desecrated in 1901, it was later used as cinema and theater;
- House of Prospero Mochi, Abbreviator at the Pope's court and general commissioner of Rome's and Borgo's fortifications during the reign of pope Paul III (r. 1534–49), erected in the 16th century. On the door's architrave is etched the owner's Latin motto: "Tua puta que tute facis" (consider yours all that you are doing).
- House of Fiammetta, the lover of Cesare Borgia, erected in the 15th century but still with medieval elements;
- Immagine di Ponte ("Image of the rione Ponte"), a 16th-century marble wayside shrine, erected around 1523: it was designed by Antonio da Sangallo the Younger, and frames a Virgin Mary by Perin del Vaga;
- House said to have been bought by Raphael (or, more probably, by his heirs) to endow his tomb in the Pantheon;
- Monte Giordano, a small artificial hill created in Roman times with the debris of the nearby Tiber harbour. In the Middle Ages, Monte Giordano was a stronghold of the noble Orsini family.

== Sources ==
- Baronio, Cesare (1697). Descrizione di Roma moderna (in Italian). M.A. and P.A. De Rossi, Roma.
- Castagnoli, Ferdinando; Cecchelli, Carlo; Giovannoni, Gustavo; Zocca, Mario (1958). Topografia e urbanistica di Roma (in Italian). Bologna: Cappelli.
- Delli, Sergio (1975). Le strade di Roma (in Italian). Rome: Newton Compton.
- Pietrangeli, Carlo (1981). Guide rionali di Roma (in Italian). Vol. Ponte (I-IV). Fratelli Palombi Editori, Roma. OCLC 10753879.
- Coarelli, Filippo (1975). Guida Archeologica di Roma (in Italian). Milan: Mondadori. ISBN 0-520-07961-2.
- Gnoli, Domenico (1990). Topografia e toponomastica di Roma medievale e moderna (in Italian). Roma: Grotta del Libro.

Preceded by Piazza Venezia	Landmarks of Rome; Via dei Coronari	Succeeded by Via del Corso
