= Santi Simone e Giuda, Rome =

Deconsecrated Catholic church in Rome, Italy

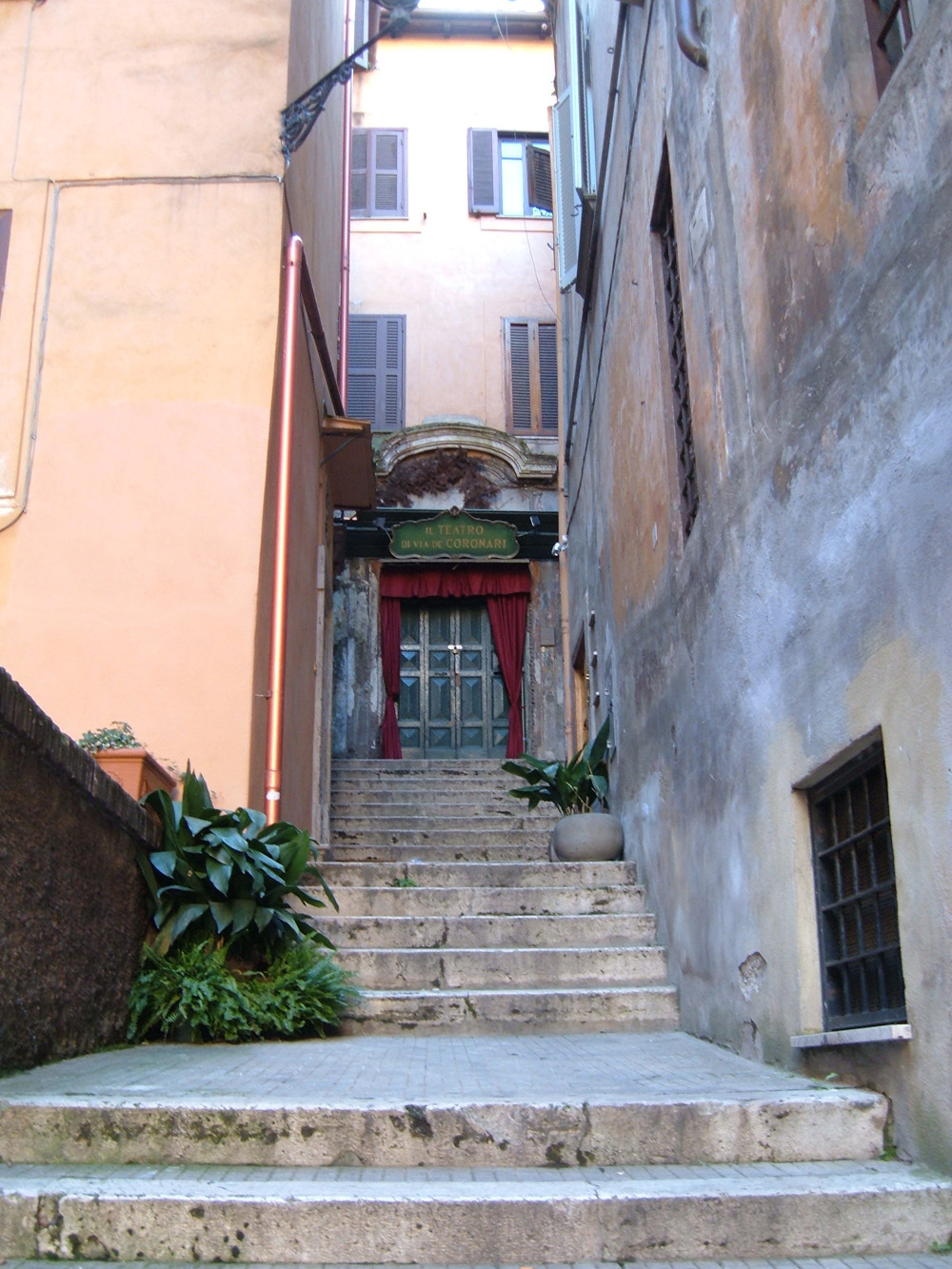
The entrance of the church at the top of Via di San Simone

Santi Simone e Giuda (Saints Simon and Jude Thaddeus, the Apostle) is a deconsecrated Catholic church in the center of Rome, Italy. It is important for historical reasons.

== Location ==
The building lies in rione Ponte, at the top of Monte Giordano, an artificial hill to the south-east of Ponte Sant'Angelo, created in the Roman era from the rubble from the nearby marble quay on the Tiber. It can be reached by a staircase which is part of Via di San Simone, a side lane of Via dei Coronari overlooking the south side of the church of San Salvatore in Lauro. The church could once also be accessed on the southwest side, from Via della Vetrina.

== History ==
The building dates back to the 12th century; it was consecrated by Pope Paschal II (r. 1099–1118), and again by Pope Innocent II (r. 1130–43) in 1143 (an inscription still exists in the church). Initially it was dedicated to Santa Maria de Monticellis (or in Monticello), in reference to Monte Giordano where the church was built and where Giordano Orsini's palace was located. Orsini was appointed cardinal by his brother Nicholas III Orsini (r. 1277–80), although it is more probable that the mount's name derives from his nephew, another Giordano Orsini, who was a senator of Rome in 1341. Hülsen reports the following information about the church: "In regard to its common name, the details conveyed by Pancirolo should be remembered: "The Monticello was so high that in 1598 while the Tiber was flooding in the surroundings on the night of our Lord's holy Christmas, it remained untouched by the flood.""

Later it was known as S. Maria de Monte Johannis Ronzonis, from Giovanni di Roncione (or Ronzone), Signore of Riano towards the middle of the 12th century and the first known owner of Monte Giordano. The church depended on San Lorenzo in Damaso in Parione. It was also known as Santa Maria de Curte (Ursinorum).

From the 16th century until its deconsecration the church was under the giuspatronato of the Orsini family.

Only after the middle of the 16th century was it dedicated to the Apostles Simon and Jude, but the name is older, since it was added in the mid-15th century to that of the Virgin Mary. During the 17th and 18th centuries the church was a parish and was restored in 1720 by Pope Clement XI Albani (r. 1700–21).

The church was deconsecrated and auctioned in 1902 by Prince Filippo Orsini. In 1905, the northern part, accessed from Via di S. Simone, became the "Alcazar" cinema, then a restaurant and finally a theater which ceased its activity in 2006. The southern part was transformed into apartments.

== Description ==
The building is located at the top of a staircase surrounded by ancient houses, one of them bearing a property plate of the Gravina branch of the Orsini family. The church's door frame dates from the 18th century restoration. Originally the building had a nave flanked by two aisles, and was decorated with several frescoes. However, after its deconsecration, all that remained was a fragment of Crucifixion from the 14th century and a Madonna con Bambino e Santi from the second half of 15th century created by the Umbro-Roman school and attributed to students of Antoniazzo Romano. Tombstones commemorating burials at the church were moved after its deconsecration to the portico of the Church of San Silvestro in Capite in the rione of Trevi.

== Sources ==
- Baronio, Cesare (1697). Descrizione di Roma moderna (in Italian). M.A. and P.A. De Rossi, Roma.
- Delli, Sergio (1988) [1975]. Le strade di Roma (in Italian). Roma: Newton Compton.
- Hülsen, Christian (1927). Le chiese di Roma nel Medio Evo (in Italian). Firenze.
- Pietrangeli, Carlo (1981). Guide rionali di Roma (in Italian). Vol. Ponte (II). Roma: Fratelli Palombi Editori. ISSN 0393-2710.
- Rendina, Claudio (2000). Le chiese di Roma (in Italian). Milano: Newton & Compton Editori. ISBN 978-88-541-1833-1.

41°54′1.2054″N 12°28′9.80″E / 41.900334833°N 12.4693889°E / 41.900334833; 12.4693889
