= List of bridges in Rome =

Ponte Garibaldi

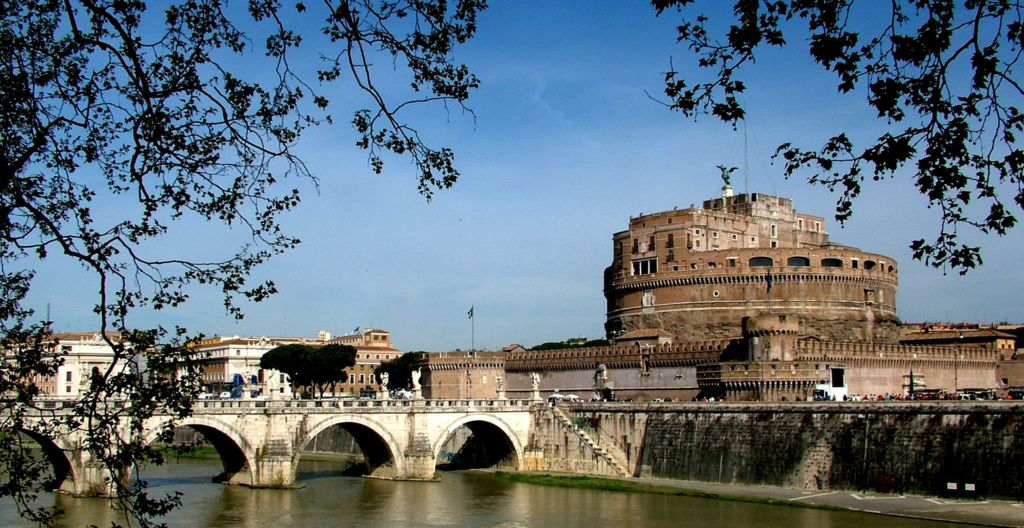
Ponte Sant'Angelo

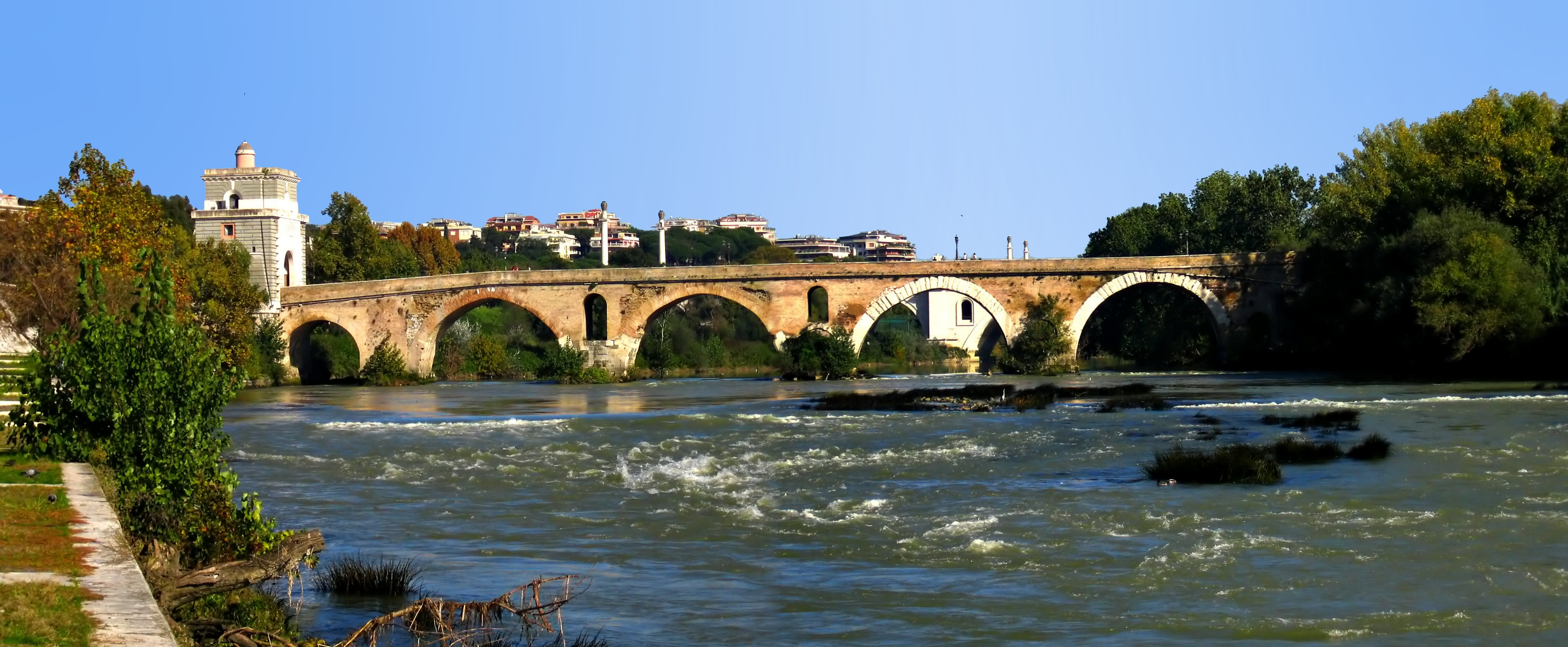
Ponte Milvio

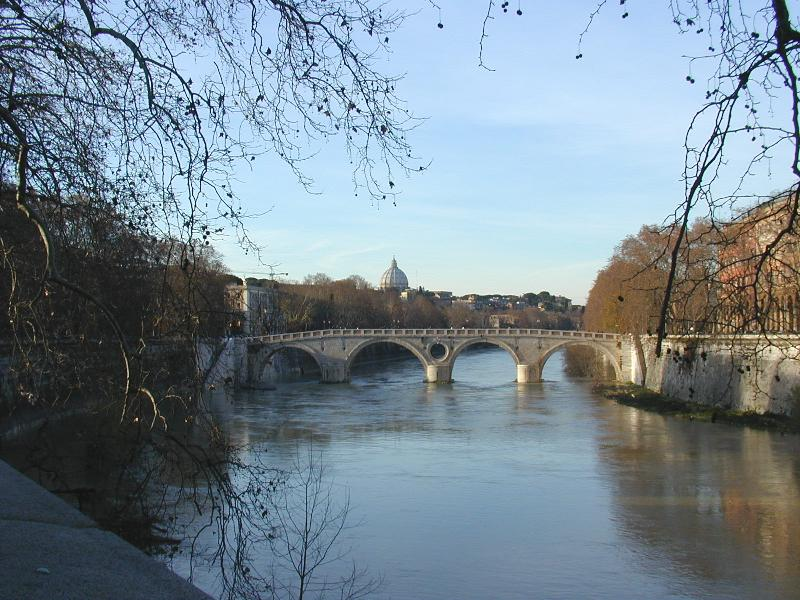
Ponte Sisto

This is an incomplete list of bridges in the city of Rome, in Italy:

- Pons Sublicius (around 642 BC)
- Ponte di Castel Giubileo (built 1951)
- Ponte di Tor di Quinto (1960)
- Ponte Cestio (1st century BC), also called Ponte San Bartolomeo
- Ponte Flaminio (1932–1951)
- Ponte Milvio (207 BC; formerly called Ponte Mollo)
- Ponte Nomentano (1st century BC)
- Ponte Duca d'Aosta (1939–1942)
- Ponte della Musica-Armando Trovajoli (2008–2011)
- Ponte Risorgimento (1911)
- Ponte Matteotti (1929; pre 1945 called Ponte delle Milizie or Ponte Littorio)
- Ponte Nenni (1971–1972)
- Ponte Regina Margherita (1886–1891, also called Ponte Margherita)
- Ponte Cavour (1891–1896)
- Ponte Umberto I (1885)
- Ponte Sant'Angelo (134, formerly called Pons Aelius (Ponte Elio))
- Ponte Vittorio Emanuele II (1886–1911; also called Ponte Vittorio)
- Ponte Principe Amedeo (1942, instead of Ponte dei Fiorentini)
- Ponte Mazzini (1904–1908)
- Ponte Sisto (1473–1479; instead of Ponte di Agrippa, also called Ponte Aurelio, Ponte Antonino or Ponte di Valentiniano, formerly called Pons fractus or Pons ruptus )
- Ponte Garibaldi (1888)
- Ponte San Bartolomeo (mid 1st century BC, formerly called Pons Cestius)
- Ponte dei Quattro Capi (62 BC, called Pons Fabricius)
- Fragments of Ponte Rotto (241 BC, formerly called Pons Aemilius (Ponte Emilio), Ponte di Lepido, Ponte lapideo, Ponte dei Senatori or Ponte Maggiore)
- Ponte Palatino (1886–1891), also called Ponte Inglese, Ponte degli inglesi
- Ponte Aventino (1914–1919; also called Ponte Sublicio)
- Ponte Testaccio (1938–1948)
- Ponte dell'Industria (1863; also called Ponte di San Paolo or Ponte di Ferro, formerly a Railway bridge)
- Ponte della Scienza (2008–2014)
- Ponte Settimia Spizzichino (2009–2012)
- Ponte Marconi (1937–1954)
- Ponte della Magliana (1930–1948)
- Ponte di Mezzocammino (1943–1951)

== See also ==
- Roman bridge
- List of tourist attractions in Rome
