= Bartolomeo Marliani =

Italian antiquarian

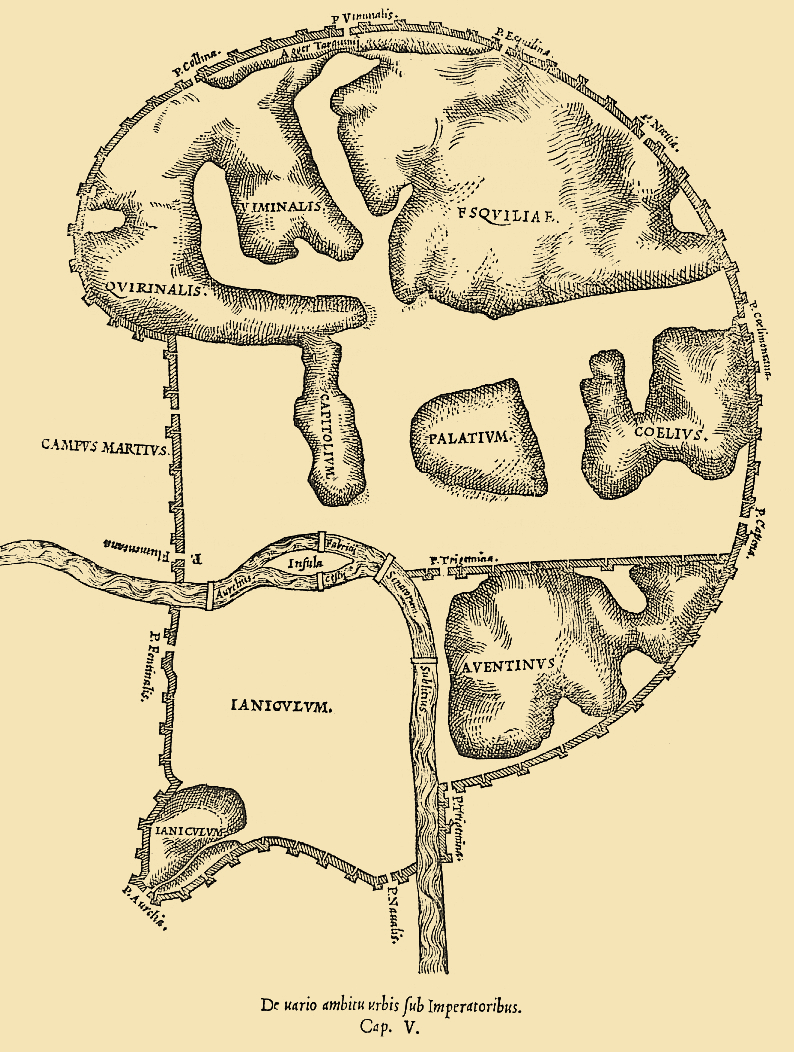
Map of Rome's city walls and gates from the 1544 edition of Antiquae Romae topographia.

Giovanni Bartolomeo Marliano (1488 - 26 July 1566) was an Italian antiquarian and topographer, most notable for his study of the topography of ancient Rome, particularly his seven-volume Antiquae Romae topographia, a complete treatment of the city's ancient topography. First published in 1534 and republished nine times, it remained the standard treatise on the city's topography until the 18th century. He lost a debate with Pirro Ligorio on the site of the Roman Forum, but was later proved right in that matter.

== Life ==
Born to Gabriele Marliani in Robbio, Bartolomeo Marliano studied ancient Greek in Milan with Stefano Negri, a pupil of the Greek humanist Demetrios Chalkokondyles. He continued his studies at the University of Padua, where he also met the future cardinal Giovanni Morone. Just before 1525 he moved to Rome, where he was made a knight of the Order of Saint Peter by Pope Paul III. After 1544 Marliani distanced himself from the papal court to concentrate wholly on his studies. He became an Augustinian friar and moved to the Tor Sanguigna near Sant'Agostino in Campo Marzio. In 1549 he published Consulum, dictatorum ..., an edition of the Fasti Capitolini, which had been discovered in the Roman Forum two years earlier - that work had nine editions, including one by Francesco Robortello, published in 1555 in Venice with a supplement of extracts by the publisher.

As well as his topographical studies, Marliani also published several works on ancient Greek writers. In 1545 he published a single edition of a text by Sophocles, though he bequeathed manuscripts of the Iliad and Odyssey and works by Aristophanes, Pindar, Strabo, Lucian, Apollonius and other ancient Greek authors to the library at Sant'Agostino (the future biblioteca Angelica). He had probably used many of these manuscripts for his private reading. A document dating to 1560 shows he belonged to the 'Confraternita degli orfani e delle orfane', a charitable institution looking after male and female orphans which was supported by cardinal Giovanni Morone, with a fellow scholar of Marliani's. He also founded the 'Compagnia di S. Apollonia' which in January 1566, a few months after Marliani's death in Rome, was confirmed in a papal bull by Pope Pius V.

== Antiquae Romae topographia ==
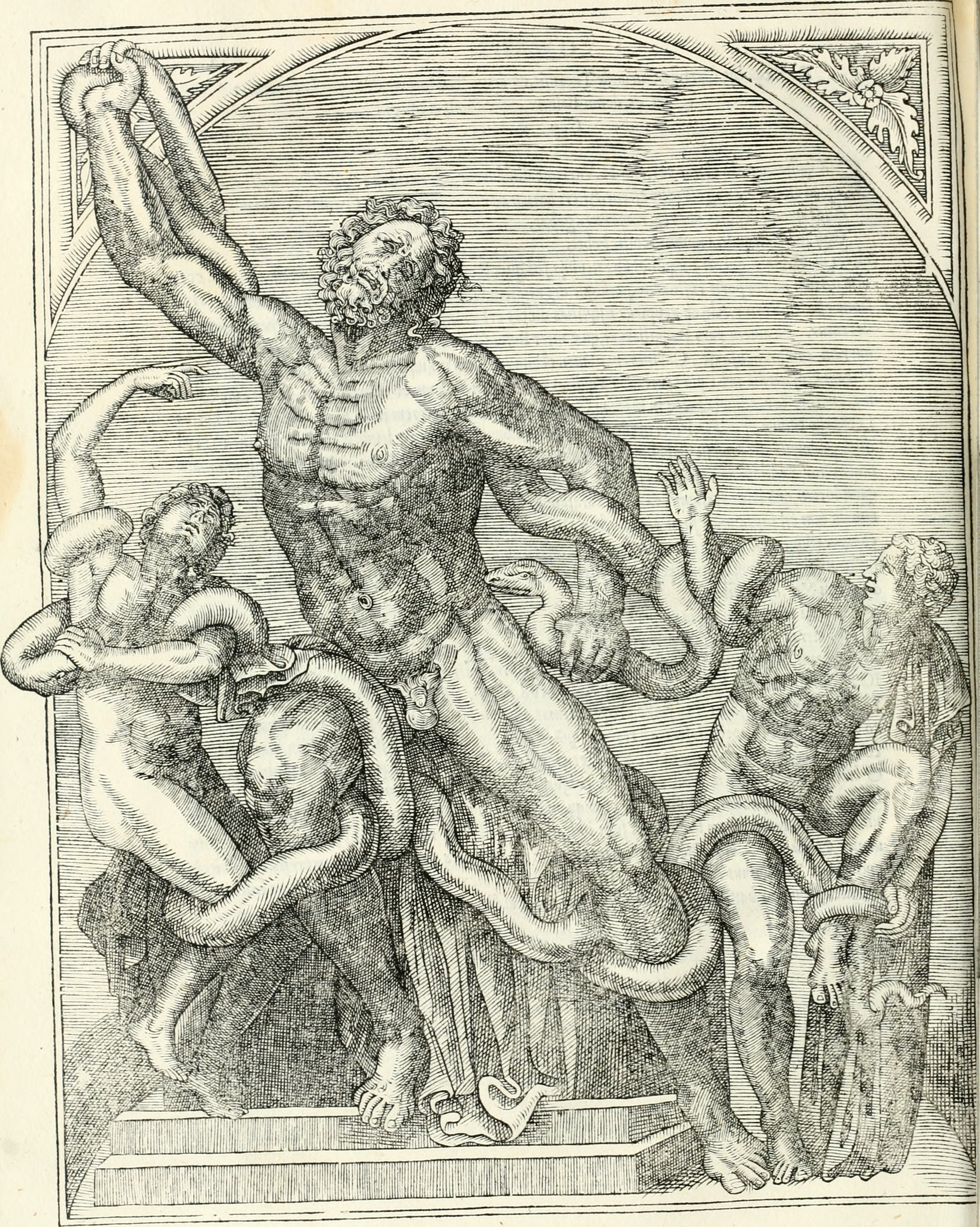
Engraving of Laocoön and His Sons from the 1544 edition of Antiquae Romae topographia

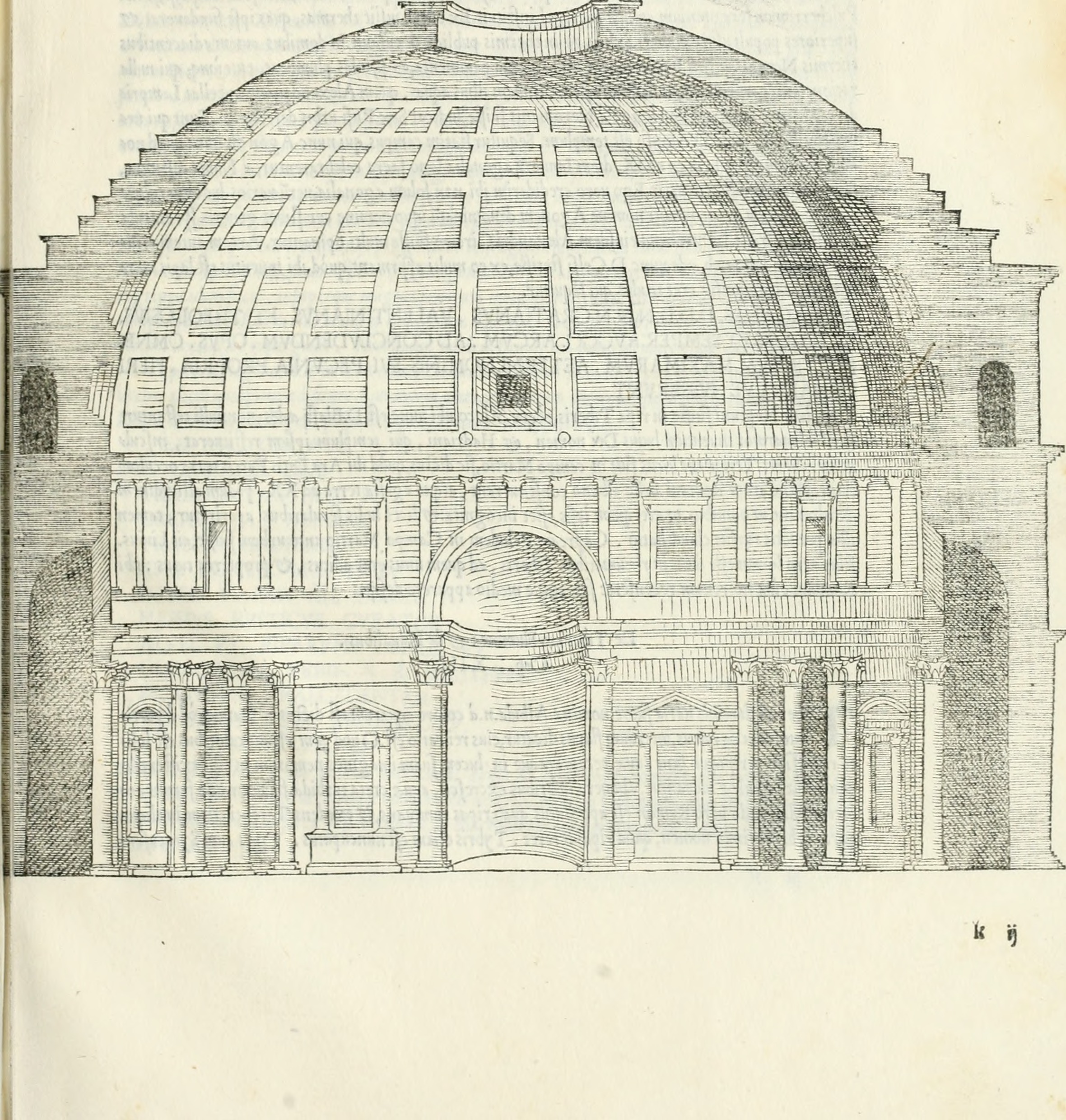
Cross-section of the Pantheon from the 1544 edition of Antiquae Romae topographia, edizione del 1544

In Rome in 1534 published Antiquae, dedicating it to cardinal Giovanni Domenico De Cupis. Marliani based it on a minute analysis of ancient literature and epigraphy and the results of contemporary excavations. The work's first edition contained several errors, which its author attributed to his being absent while it was printed, but it was enthusiastically received and republished several times, with extracts also appearing in several other works and editions of ancient authors such as Livy, Sallust and Florus.

The same year François Rabelais published a corrected version dedicated to cardinal Jean du Bellay and stamped with the lion of publisher and humanist Sebastian Gryphius. In 1538 Thomas Platter added an extract from the work to his edition of topographical works by Pomponio Leto and 'Publio Vittore' (actually a pen-name for Platter). In 1544 Marliani republished the work, adding plans, views and cross-sections of ancient buildings. Later editions were based on this second edition. A translation into Italian by Ercole Barbarasa was published in 1548 and until the 18th century Marliani's work was being reprinted in Italy and other countries.

The work accurately located the Roman Forum, but that aspect was obscured by a fierce debate with Pirro Ligorio, who in Christian Hülsen's words was a "famous architect ... but as an antiquarian [only] an ambitious dilettante". Ligorio sited it between the Campidoglio and the Palatine Hill and strongly criticised Marliani's work. This forced Marliani to add an addendum to a 1553 reprint of 'Topographia', in which a reborn Romulus claims a different site for the Roman Forum, but the author replies to him "Romulus, having just crossed the Lethe and thus forgotten all the places in the city, you swear the same nonsense as Strepsiades.“ Ligorio emphatically supported his theory using invented inscriptions and monuments and so his opinion prevailed until early 19th century excavations proved Marliani to have been correct.

== Works ==
- Antiquae Romae topographia, libri septem. Rome 1534 (original edition on Google-Books; Digitalised version from the edition by François Rabelais, Lione 1534).
- Hoc libello haec continentur Sophoclis tragici poetae vita non prius in lucem edita. Eiusdem poetae sententiae pulcherrimae. Rome 1545 (Digitalised version).
- Consulum, dictatorum censorumque Romanorum series una cum ipsorum triumphis, quae marmoribus scalpta in foro reperta est, atque in Capitolium translata. Rome 1549 (Digitalised version).
