= Statue of King Philip IV of Spain (Bernini) =

Sculpture by Gian Lorenzo Bernini and Girolamo Lucenti

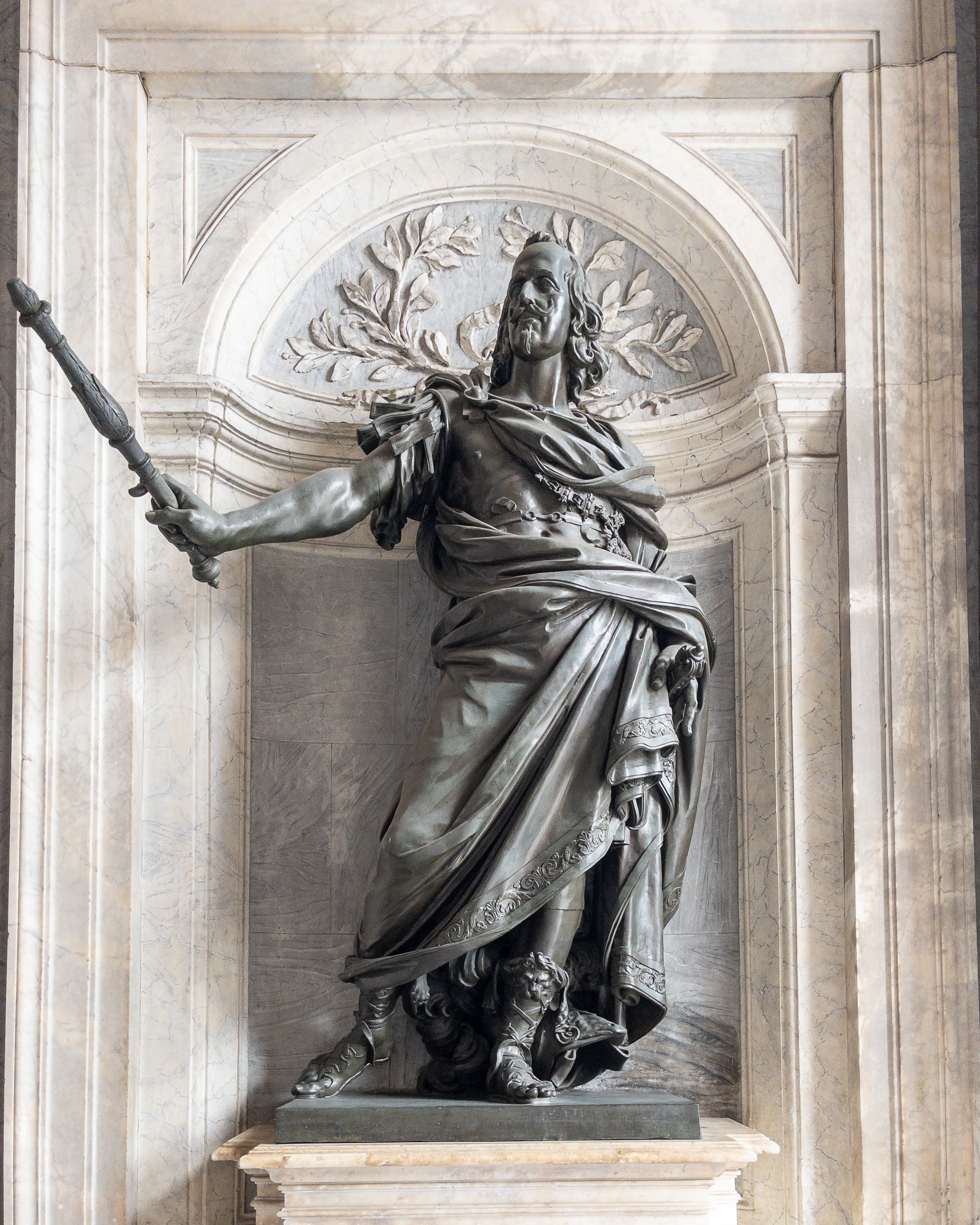
- Artist: Gian Lorenzo Bernini
- Year: 1664–1666
- Type: Sculpture
- Medium: Bronze
- Subject: Philip IV of Spain
- Location: Santa Maria Maggiore, Rome; 41°53′51″N 12°29′55″E
- Preceded by: Bust of Louis XIV
- Followed by: Elephant and Obelisk

A bronze statue of King Philip IV of Spain by Italian artists Gian Lorenzo Bernini and Girolamo Lucenti is installed in the Basilica of Santa Maria Maggiore, in Rome. Bernini developed the initial design and oversaw the project, while Lucenti created the modello and cast the bronze, but "the statue is in every way the result of a process that involved successive aesthetic and technical contributions from both artists."

== Description ==
King Philip IV is depicted as a military leader in historical attire, wearing a cuirass, cloak, and boots. He holds a scepter in his right hand while resting his left hand on the sword's hilt. His pose is captured in an exaggerated contrapposto stance, with his head turned towards the right and his gaze directed beyond the raised scepter, creating the impression that he is about to issue a command. The sculpture depicts the king as a hero, embodying the qualities of a warrior-king and protector of the Catholic church.

The statue is located in the Basilica of Santa Maria Maggiore in Rome. Upon entering the portico, the statue is against the right wall.

== History ==
The statue was first proposed in 1643, but a contract was not signed until 1664. Work began the same year and the sculpture was completed in 1666.

== Gallery ==
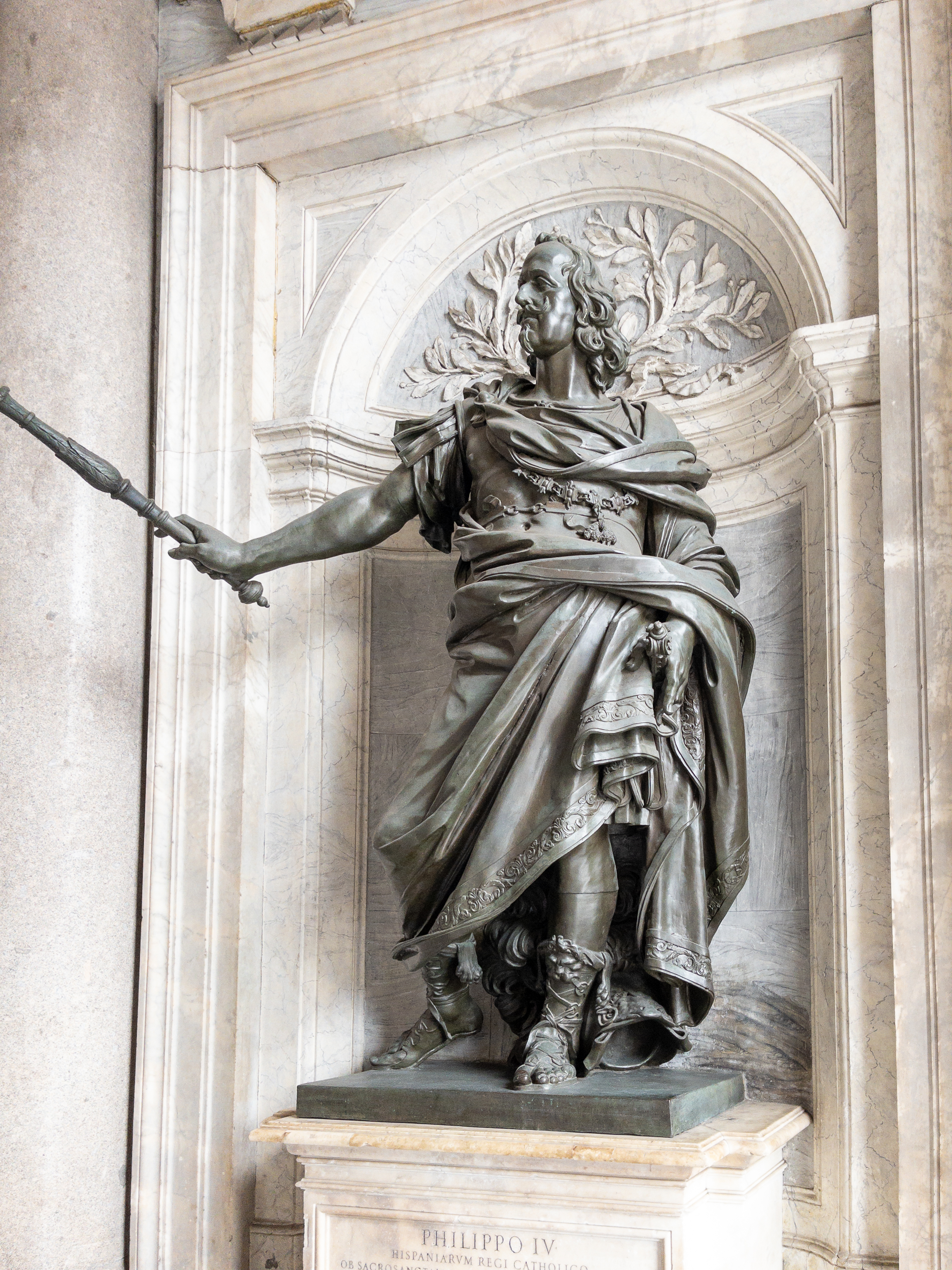

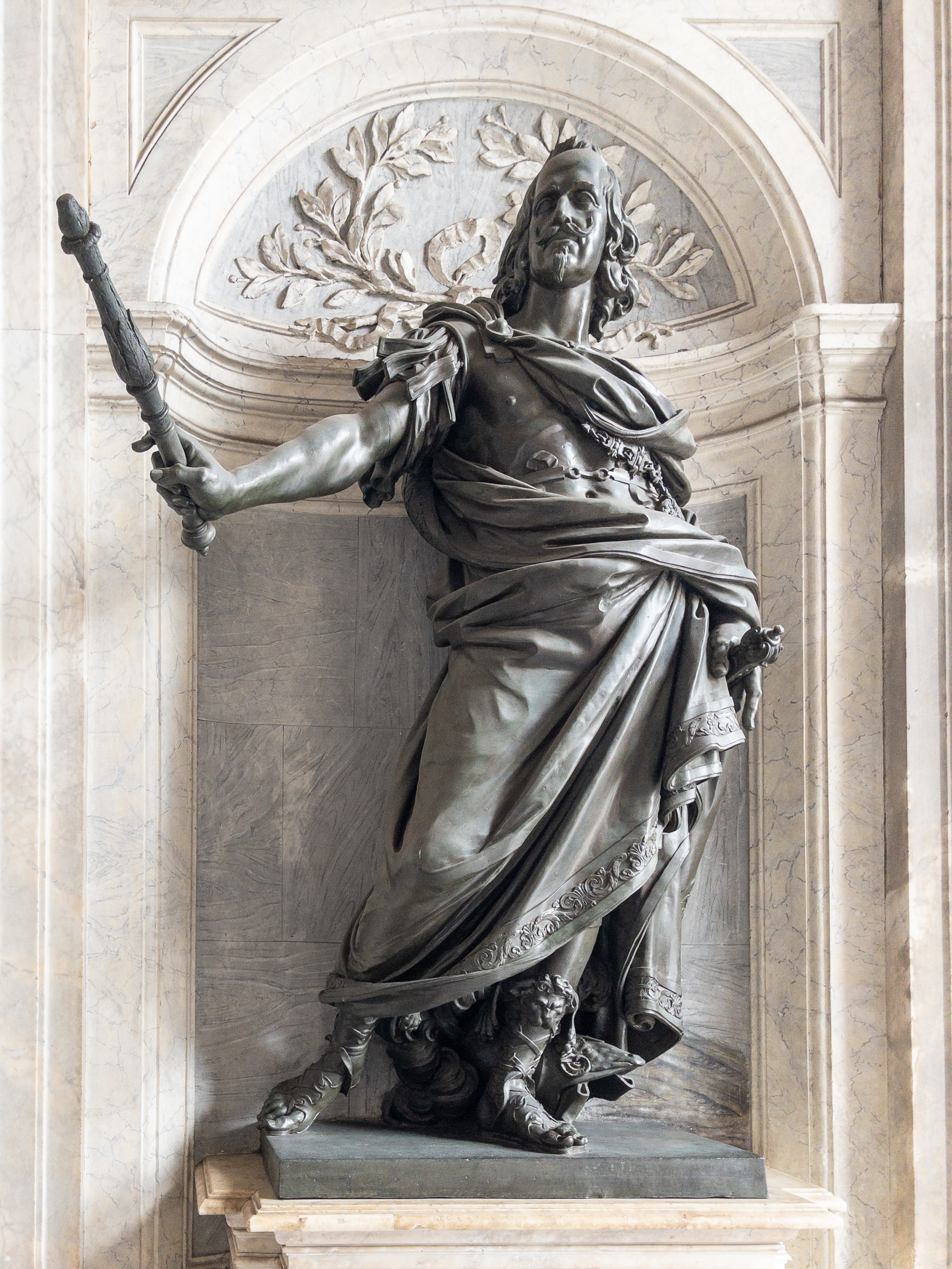

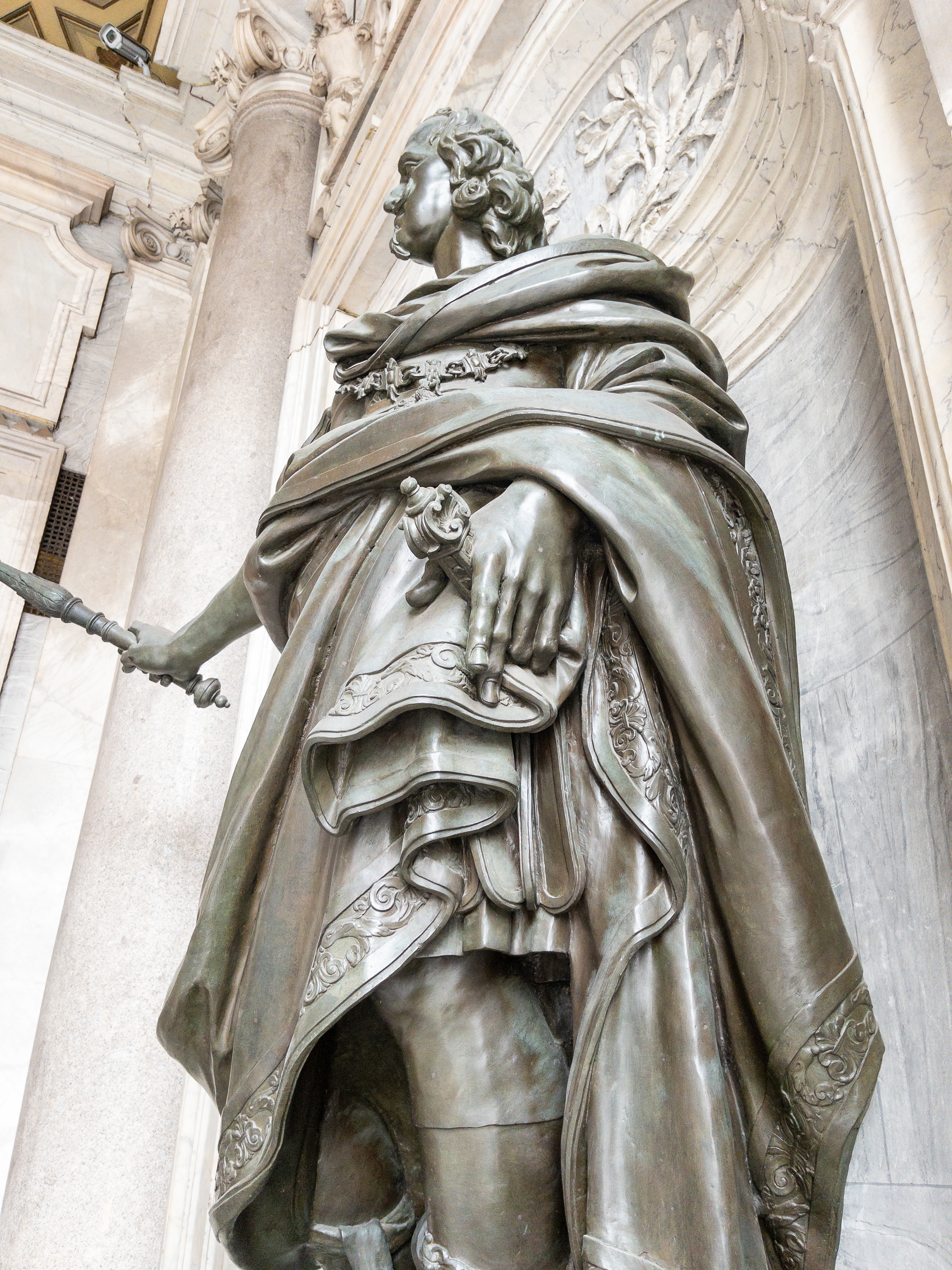

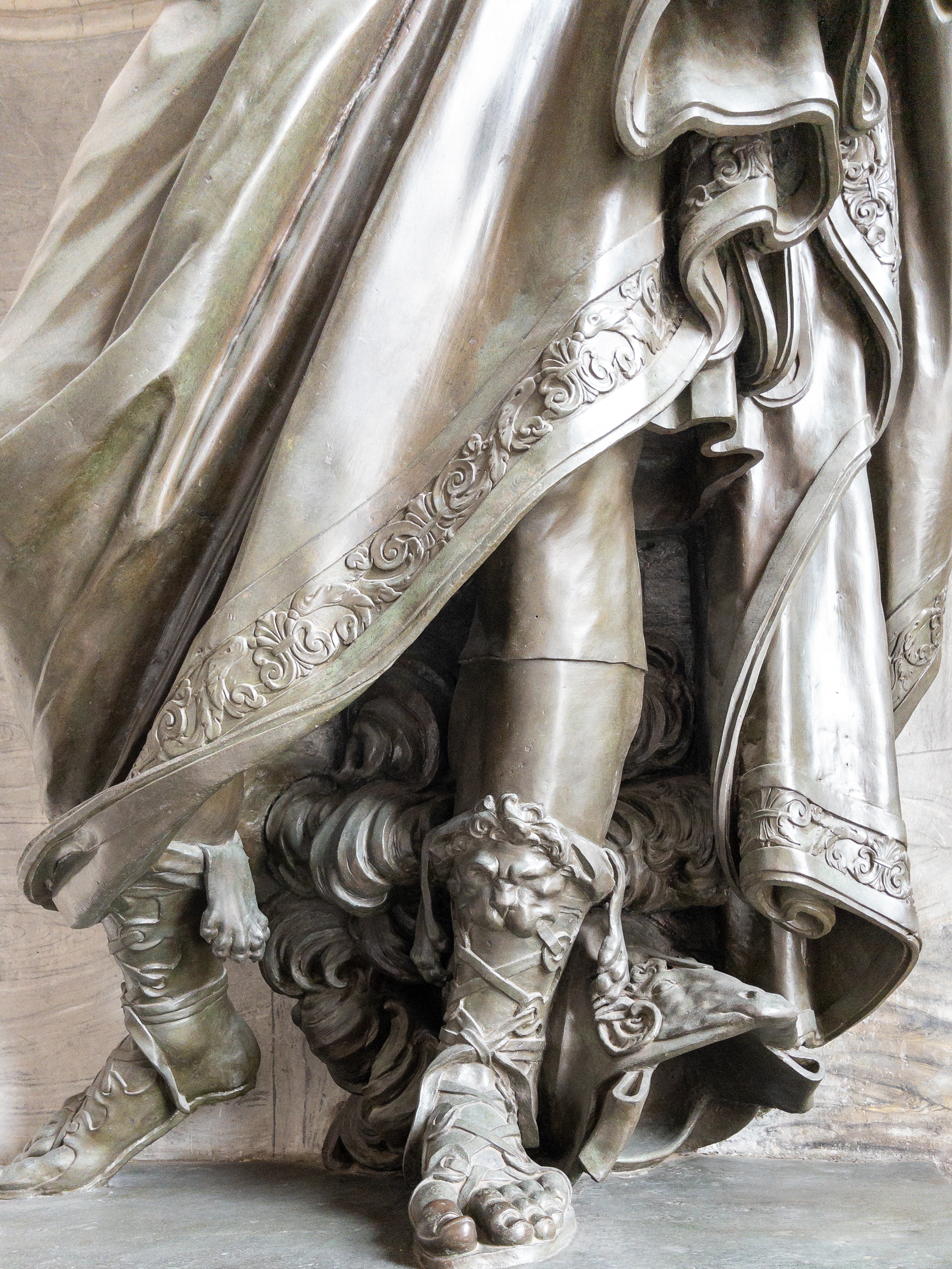

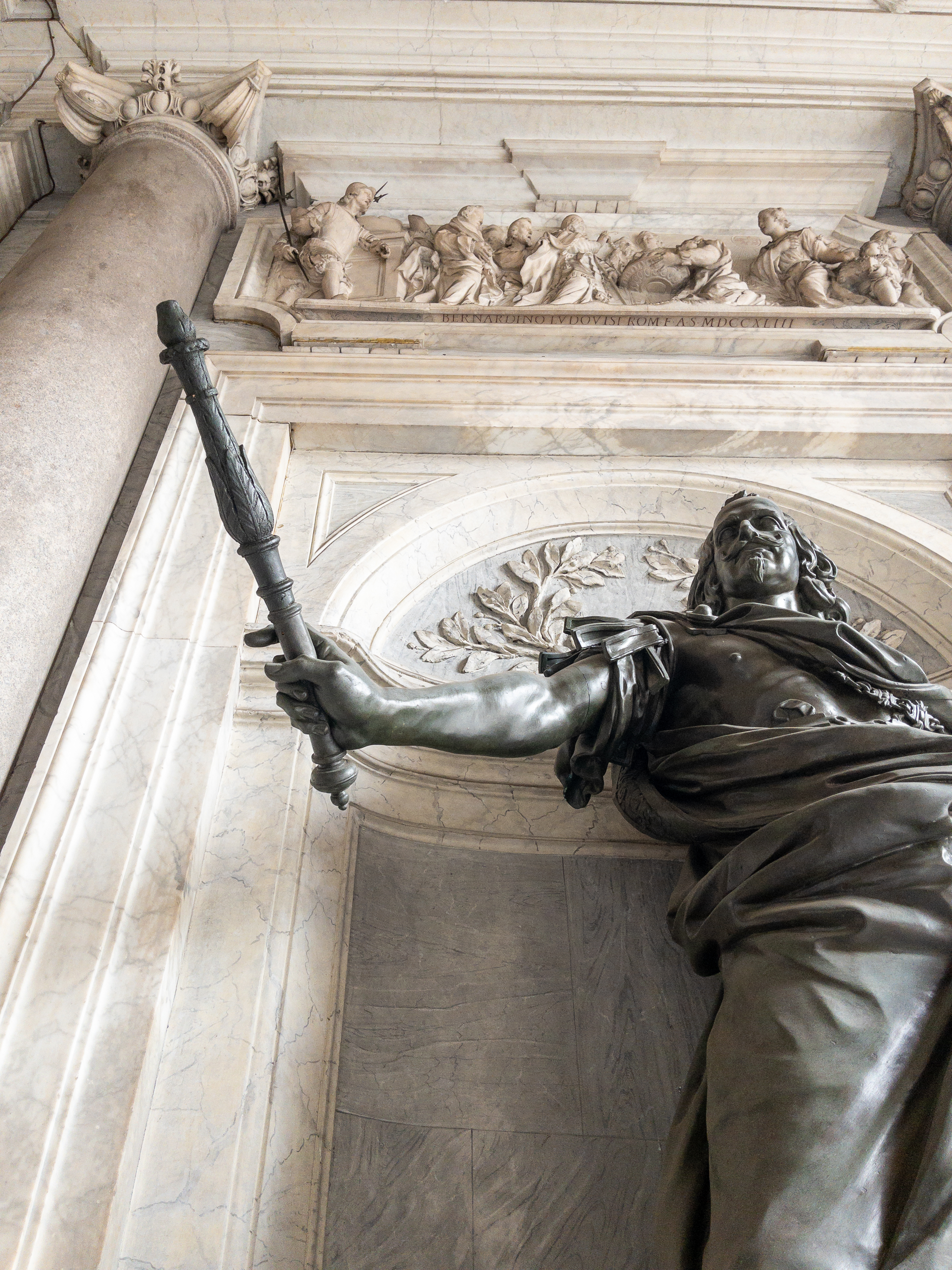

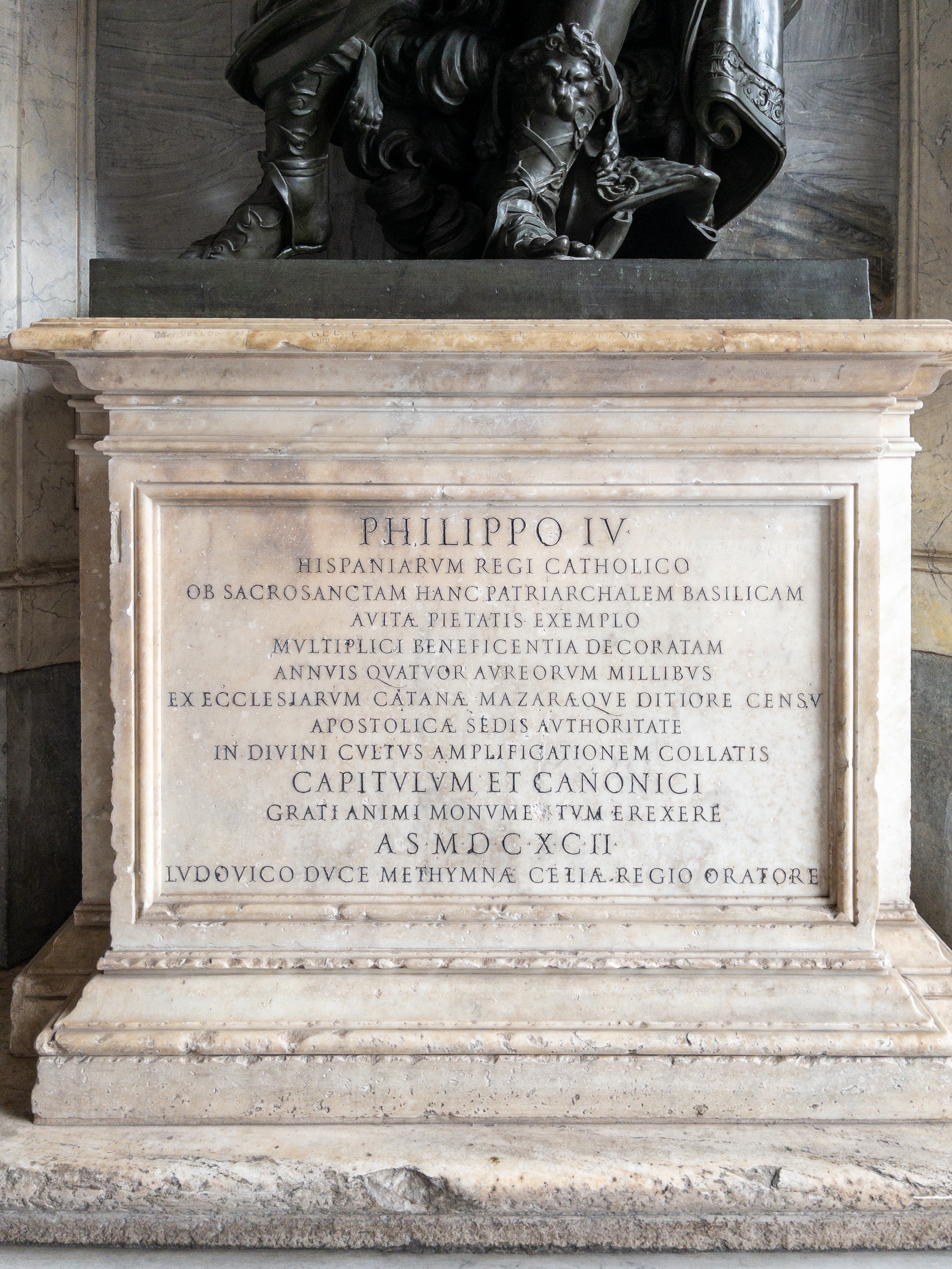

== See also ==
- List of works by Gian Lorenzo Bernini
