= Ponte (rione of Rome) =

Coordinates: 41°54′29″N 12°27′57″E

- Rione of Rome
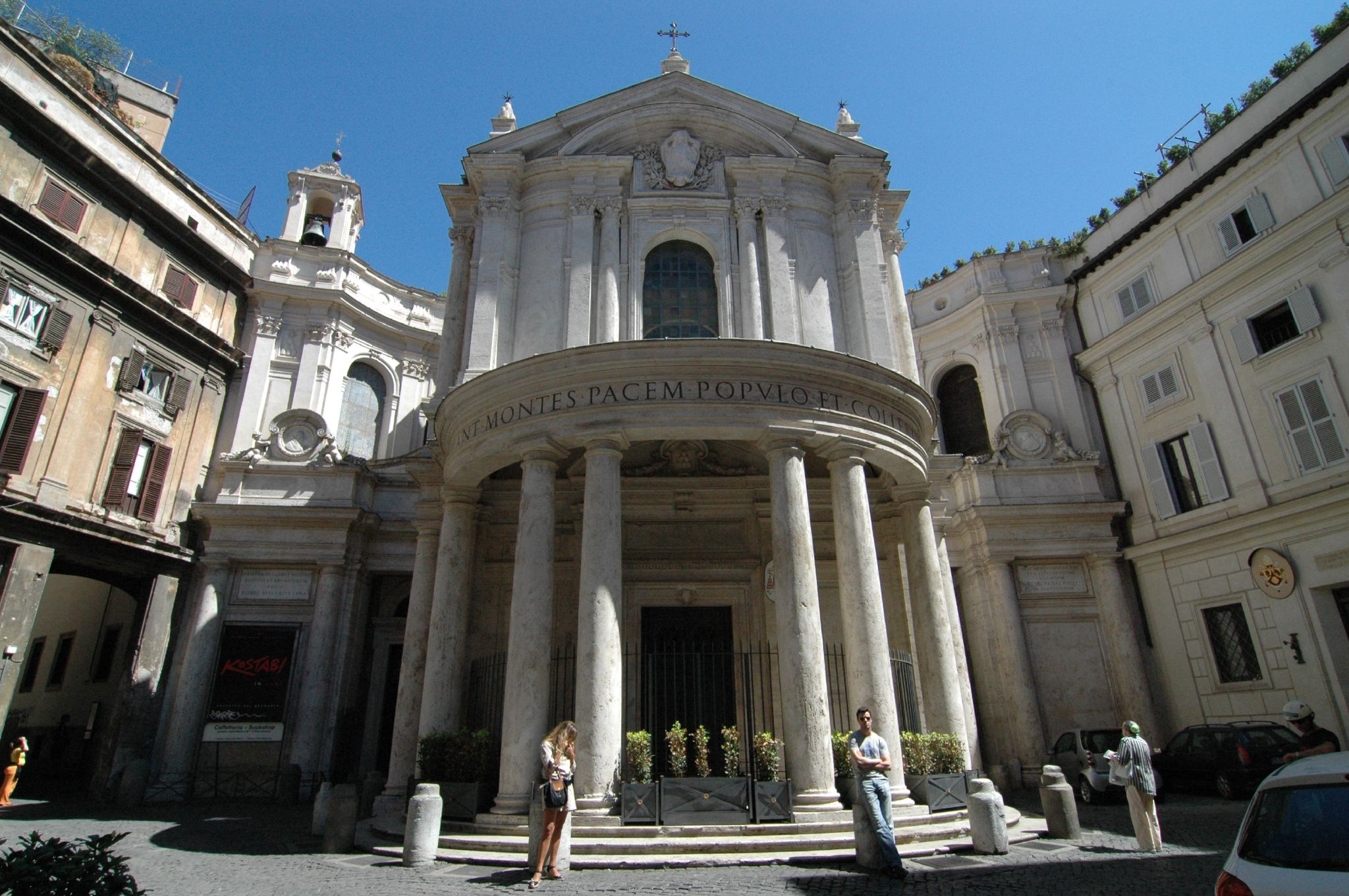
- Church of Santa Maria della Pace

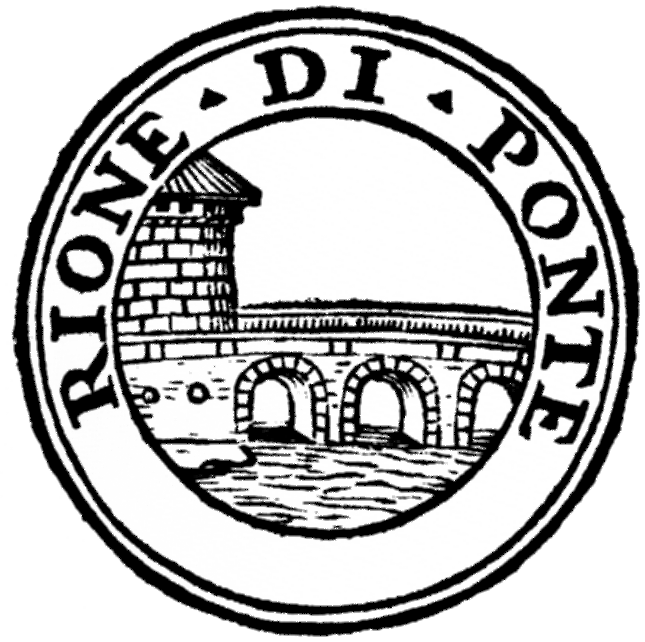
- Seal

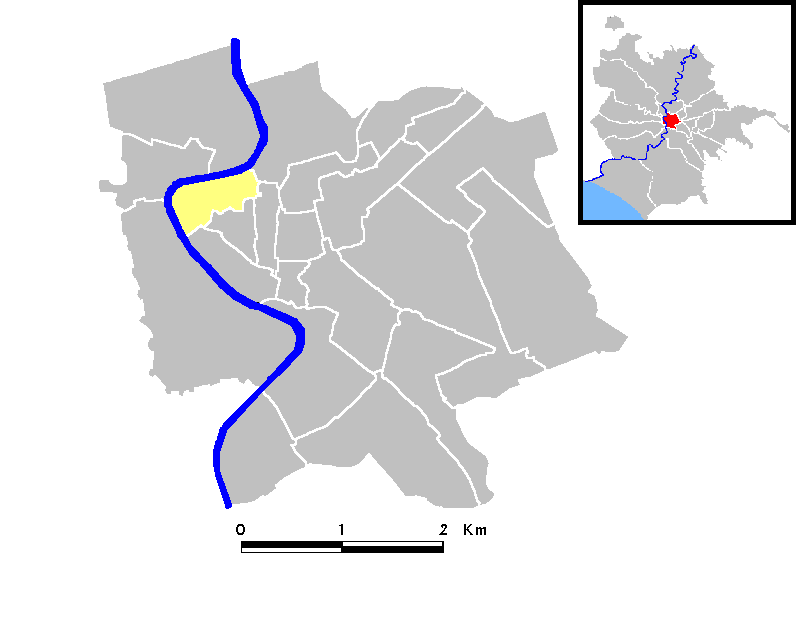
- Position of the rione within the center of the city
- Country: Italy
- Region: Lazio
- Province: Rome
- Comune: Rome
- Time zone: UTC+1 (CET)
  - Summer (DST): UTC+2 (CEST)

Ponte is the 5th rione of Rome, Italy, identified by the initials R. V, and is located in Municipio I. Its name (English: 'bridge') comes from Ponte Sant'Angelo, which connects Ponte with the rione of Borgo. This bridge was built by Emperor Hadrian (and originally was named after him Pons Aelius) in 134 AD to connect his mausoleum to the rest of the city. Though Pope Sixtus V changed the rione limits, so that the bridge belongs now to Borgo, not to Ponte anymore, the area has kept its name and a bridge as its coat of arms.

== History ==
In ancient Rome, the area belonged to the IX Augustan region called Circus Flaminius, that was a part of the Campus Martius. Nero built another bridge, that was called Neronianus or triumphalis because the Via Triumphalis, the Triumphal Way, passed over it: starting with Titus, the victorious emperors celebrating their triumphs entered Rome marching through it.

Nero's bridge was also called Pons Vaticanus (English: 'Vatican Bridge'), because it connected the Ager Vaticanus to the left bank, later Pons ruptus ('broken bridge'), because it was already ruined in the Middle Ages. In ancient Rome there was a port that was used to carry the materials for temples and great works to the Campus Martius.

The active life of the area went on during the Middle Ages and the modern period, and this activity deleted almost all signs of ancient Rome in the rione. The population increased because many people moved from the surrounding hills to Ponte, because of the lack of water in other parts of Rome, since it was then possible to drink the water of the River Tiber. Moreover, the rione was on the edge of Ponte Sant'Angelo, thus all the main streets of Rome were leading there and the area was full of pilgrims going to the Vatican. That is why it was full of inns, restaurants, shops of holy objects, etc.

During the 16th century the rione was very important for its streets, like Via Giulia and Via dei Coronari; that is why several palaces of the greatest families of Rome were built according to the projects of famous artists, thus making the area very renowned.

A common event in the area was to see a small procession led by a person dressed in black, covering his face, carrying a crucifix on his shoulders. On a wagon there was a chained condemned man kissing continuously an image of Jesus. The destination of the procession was the square in front of Ponte Sant'Angelo, where the gallows were.

Although Ponte was a quite rich area, it was the one most affected by the frequent flooding of the River Tiber.

The look of the rione changed completely after Rome became capital of reunited Italy in 1870: the embankments of the river were built to stop the flooding and new bridges were made to connect Vatican City and the rione Prati to the rest of Rome. All the narrow streets leading to the river were lost, to make space for the embankments, but it is still possible to see the typical look of the older rione in the inner parts of the area.

== Geography ==
=== Boundaries ===
To the north, Ponte borders with the stretch of the Tiber between Ponte Principe Amedeo and Ponte Umberto I, that separates it from Borgo (R. XIV) and Prati (R. XXII).

Eastward, Ponte briefly borders with Campo Marzio (R. IV), the boundary being Via del Cancello and Via dell'Orso. It also borders with Sant'Eustachio (R. VIII), which is separated from Ponte by Via dei Pianellari, Piazza di Sant'Agostino e Via di Sant'Agostino.

Southward, the rione borders with Parione (R. VI), whose boundary is defined by Piazza delle Cinque Lune, Piazza di Tor Sanguigna, Largo Febo, Via di Santa Maria dell'Anima, Via di Tor Millina, Via della Pace, Piazza del Fico, Via del Corallo, Via del Governo Vecchio, Via dei Filippini and Vicolo Cellini. To the south, Ponte also borders with Regola (R. VII), from which is separated by Via dei Banchi Vecchi, Via delle Carceri, Vicolo della Scimia and Via Bravaria, up to the Tiber.

To the west, Ponte borders with Trastevere (R. XIII), from which is separated by the stretch of the Tiber between Ponte Giuseppe Mazzini and Ponte Principe Amedeo.

== Places of interest ==
=== Palaces and other buildings ===
- Palazzo Alberini, in Via del Banco di Santo Spirito.
- Palazzo Altemps, in Piazza di Sant'Apollinare.
- Palazzo del Banco di Santo Spirito, in Via del Banco di Santo Spirito.
- Palazzo Cesi-Gaddi, in Via della Maschera d'Oro.
- Palazzo Gambirasi, in Via della Pace.
- Palazzo Lancellotti, in Via Lancellotti.
- Palazzo Milesi, in Via della Maschera d'Oro.
- Palazzo Sacchetti, in Via Giulia.
- Palazzo Taverna, in Via di Monte Giordano.
- The house and studio of Marcello Piacentini, in Via di Tor di Nona.
- Teatro Tordinona, in Via degli Acquasparta.
- Tor Sanguigna, in Piazza di Tor Sanguigna.
- Torre della Scimmia, in Via dei Portoghesi.

=== Churches ===
- San Giovanni dei Fiorentini
- Sant'Apollinare, Rome
- Santi Celso e Giuliano
- San Biagio degli Armeni (San Biagio della Pagnotta)
- San Salvatore in Lauro
- Santa Maria del Suffragio
- Santa Maria dell'Anima
- Santa Maria della Pace

Deconsecrated churches

- Oratorio del Gonfalone, Rome
- San Simeone Profeta
- San Celsino (Oratory of San Celso)
- Santi Simone e Giuda

Demolished churches

- San Salvatore in Primicerio

=== Roads ===
- Lungotevere degli Altoviti
- Lungotevere dei Fiorentini
- Lungotevere Tor di Nona
- Via dei Coronari
- Via Giulia
