= Girolamo Lucenti =

Italian sculptor

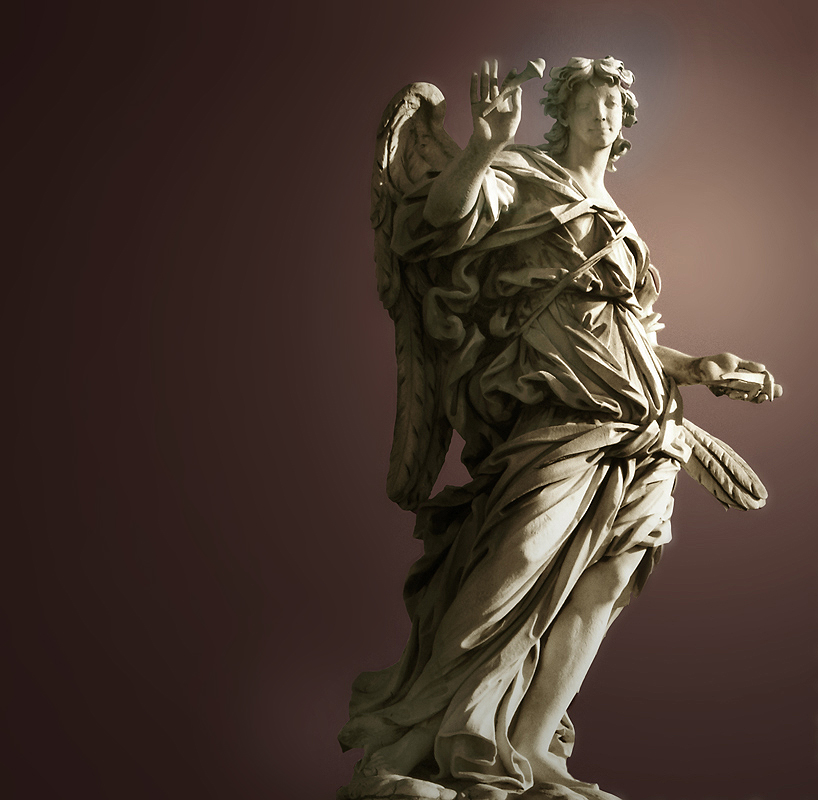
- Angel with the Nails, Ponte Sant'Angelo, Rome
- Born: 1627; Rome, Papal States
- Died: 4 April 1698 (aged 70–71); Rome, Papal States
- Education: Gian Lorenzo Bernini; Alessandro Algardi
- Known for: Sculpture
- Notable work: Statue of King Philip IV of Spain
- Movement: Baroque

Girolamo Lucenti (1627 – April 4, 1698) was an Italian sculptor of the Baroque period, active in Rome.

== Biography ==
Girolamo Lucenti was born in Rome in 1627. He learnt the craft of bronze-casting from his father, Ambrogio Lucenti (d. 1656), who worked for the Fabric of Saint Peter. He may have learnt marble carving in Bernini’s workshop, as he was one of several artists who collaborated with the master on the sculptural decoration (1647–9) of the nave and aisles of St. Peter’s, Rome, and he also worked with Bernini's rival Alessandro Algardi, since and at Algardi's death he was one of the four giovani who shared the studio. His unemotional Angel with the Nails at the Ponte Sant'Angelo is a reflection of an Algardian-restraint for an exuberant Bernini project.

Lucenti’s best-known statue is the colossal marble figure of the Angel Carrying the Column (1668–9) for the Ponte Sant’Angelo, Rome. Lucenti either misunderstood the design provided by Bernini, or lacked the necessary skill as a marble carver, as the work is awkward and lacks the easy contrapposto movement of the other statues on the bridge. Lucenti also collaborated with Bernini on the execution of the Statue of King Philip IV of Spain in Santa Maria Maggiore.

Lucenti was most successful as a die-engraver and bronze-founder. He cast artillery pieces for the Castel Sant’Angelo (1658–63 ), and worked for the Papal mint (1668–79). He cast several works in bronze for Bernini, such as the ciborium for the chapel of the Sacrament in St Peter’s, Rome (1673–4). He also worked for other artists such as Carlo Fontana, after whose designs he produced most of the bronze sculpture for the tombs of Cardinal Girolamo Gastaldi and Marquis Benedetto Gastaldi, in the choir of Santa Maria dei Miracoli, Rome (1679–86). Lucenti became a member of the Accademia di San Luca in 1654, and was knighted by Pope Clement IX c. 1669.

== Sources ==
- Wittkower, Rudolf (1980). Art and Architecture in Italy, 1600-1750. Penguin Books. p. 317.
- Ostrow, Steven F. (1991). "Gianlorenzo Bernini, Girolamo Lucenti, and the Statue of Philip IV in S. Maria Maggiore: Patronage and Politics in Seicento Rome". The Art Bulletin. 73 (1): 89–118. doi:10.2307/3045780.
- Roma e dintorni. Rome: Touring Club Italiano (TCI). 1965. pp. 182, 344, 465.
