= Ponte Umberto I =

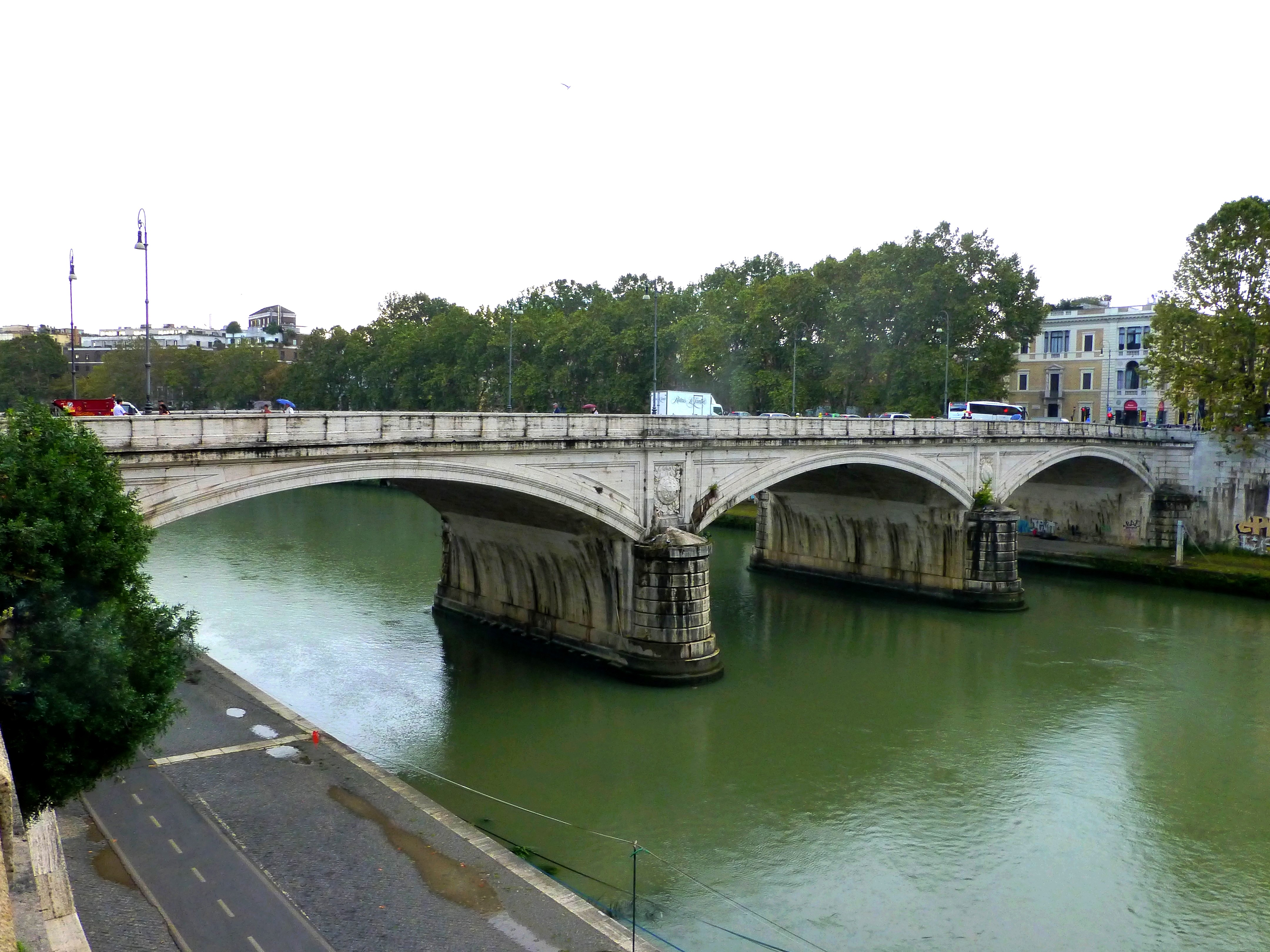
- Ponte Umberto I, Rome
- Coordinates: 41°54′10″N 12°28′16″E
- Crosses: River Tiber
- Locale: Rome, Ponte and Prati Quarters, Italy

Characteristics
- Material: Masonry
- Total length: 105 m (344.5 ft)

History
- Designer: Angelo Vescovali
- Construction start: 1885
- Construction end: 1895
- Opened: 1895

Location
- Click on the map for a fullscreen view

Ponte Umberto I, also known as Ponte Umberto, is a bridge that links Piazza di Ponte Umberto I to Piazza dei Tribunali in Rome (Italy), in the rioni Ponte and Prati.

== Description ==
The bridge was designed by architect Angelo Vescovali and built between 1885 and 1895; it was dedicated to Umberto I, King of Italy, who inaugurated the bridge together with his consort Margherita of Savoy. The bridge links the Palace of Justice (popularly known as Palazzaccio) to the area surrounding Piazza Navona.

It is made of three masonry arches covered with travertine and stone of Subiaco and is about 105 m (344 ft) long.

The bridge carries a road with 2 lanes in each direction. Unusually for a road in Italy, this road drives on the left. (Ponte Palatino also has left hand side traffic.) To prevent collisions, there is a raised section with a fence in the middle of the road.

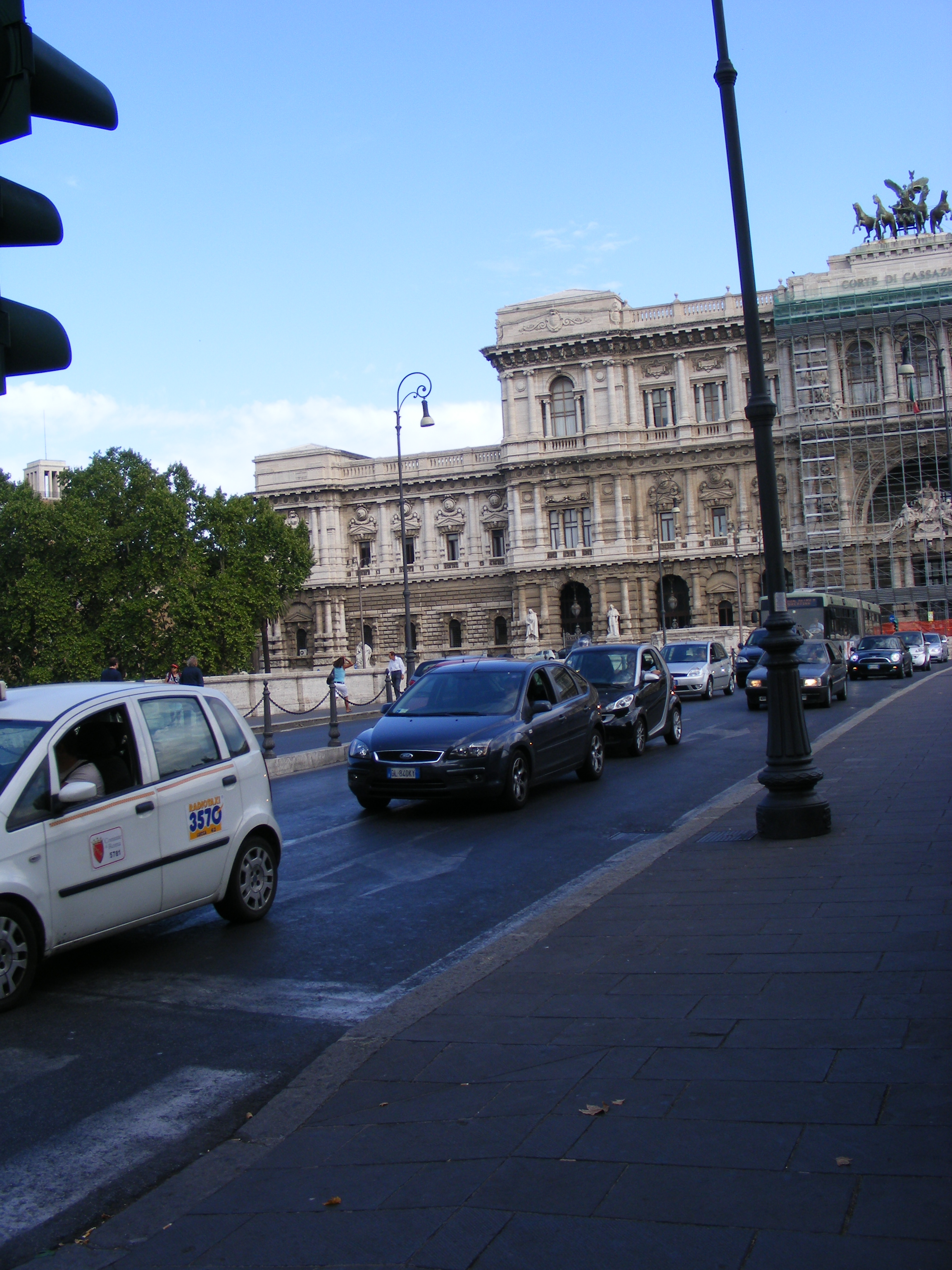
Cars on the left on the bridge

== Bibliography ==
- Ravaglioli, Armando (1997). Roma anno 2750 ab Urbe condita. Storia, monumenti, personaggi, prospettive. Rome: Tascabili Economici Newton. ISBN 88-8183-670-X.
- Rendina, Claudio (2005). Enciclopedia di Roma. Rome: Newton Compton Editori. ISBN 88-541-0304-7.
