= Tor Sanguigna =

Medieval tower in Rome, Italy

Coordinates: 41°54′02″N 12°28′22″E

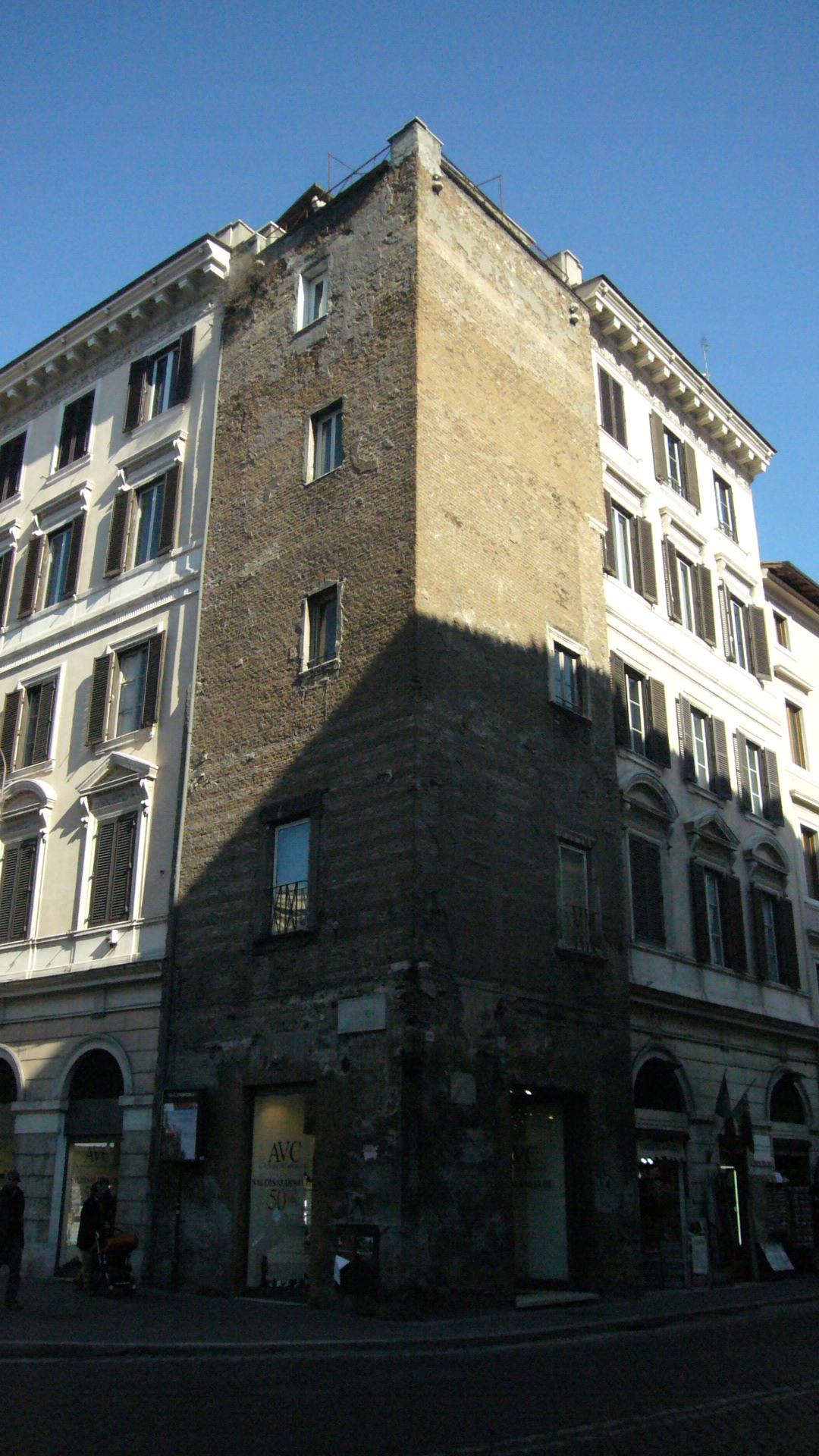

The Tor Sanguigna is one of the medieval towers of Rome, Italy, built of tufa blocks and brick sited a few metres from piazza Navona in that city's Ponte district. 'Tor Sanguigna' was already used in the Middle Ages as a toponym for the whole surrounding area between what are now via Zanardelli, via dei Coronari and Sant'Agostino church. The piazza in which the tower stands is now named after it.

== Construction ==
A small head from an ancient Roman monument is built in at first floor level and fragments of other such monuments were probably also incorporated. Remains of the original doorway's arch survive, facing onto what is now via Zanardelli, onto which four asymmetrical windows also face. On the side facing piazza Navona the tower has only two windows on the first two floors. Under the battlements can be seen stone rings - these supported wooden beams from which boiling pitch could be poured down onto attackers. Over time the graffiti adorning the tower has been lost.

== History ==
Possibly built on the site of the first tower built by the Gemini family in the 11th century, the present tower is the only survivor from the powerful Sanguigni family's historic fortress, to which pope Leo VI and other Conservatori of the Campidoglio. The Sanguigni lived there until the 15th century, going extinct in the 18th century. In the Middle Ages it was the site of bloody episodes and executions such as that of Riccardo Sanguigni, beheaded in 1406 by Paolo Orsini for siding with the Colonna. The tower became a symbol of the area, becoming linked to medieval stories and legends of crimes, violence and defenestrations. Over the 19th century the tower was completely incorporated into the surrounding palazzo, which passed to the Sagnotti family in 1860. Today only the two external sides of the tower are visible after a floor of the palazzo was raised.
