= Matteo Lucenti =

Italian footballer

Personal information
- Date of birth: 4 August 1992 (age 34)
- Place of birth: Cremona, Italy
- Height: 1.85 m (6 ft 1 in)
- Position: Centre back

Team information
- Current team: Virtus Bergamo

Youth career
- Cremonese

Senior career*
Years	Team	Apps	(Gls)
2010–2011	Cremonese	1	(0)
2011–2012	Carpenedolo	32	(2)
2012–2013	SV Turate Verbano	7	(0)
2013–2014	Darfo Boario	18	(0)
2014–2015	SSD Mapello	23	(0)
2015–2016	Ponte San Pietro	27	(0)
2016–2017	AC Vigasio	31	(2)
2017–2018	Darfo Boario	33	(2)
2018–2023	Pergolettese	85	(2)
2023–2024	Crema	30	(1)
2024–2025	Ospitaletto	25	(0)
2025–	Virtus Bergamo	34	(1)
- * Club domestic league appearances and goals as of 2 August 2026

Matteo Lucenti (born 4 August 1992) is an Italian professional footballer who plays as a centre back for Serie D club Virtus Bergamo.

== Club career ==
Born in Cremona, Lucenti started his career in Cremonese youth system, and made his first team and Serie C debut on 15 May 2011 against Sorrento. After one season on Cremonese, he played seven seasons in Serie D clubs.

He joined to Pergolettese in 2018, and won the promotion to Serie C on his first year.

== Honours ==
Pergolettese

- Serie D (Group D): 2018–19
