= Ponte Sant'Angelo =

Ancient Roman bridge in Rome

Ponte Sant'Angelo Pons Aelius
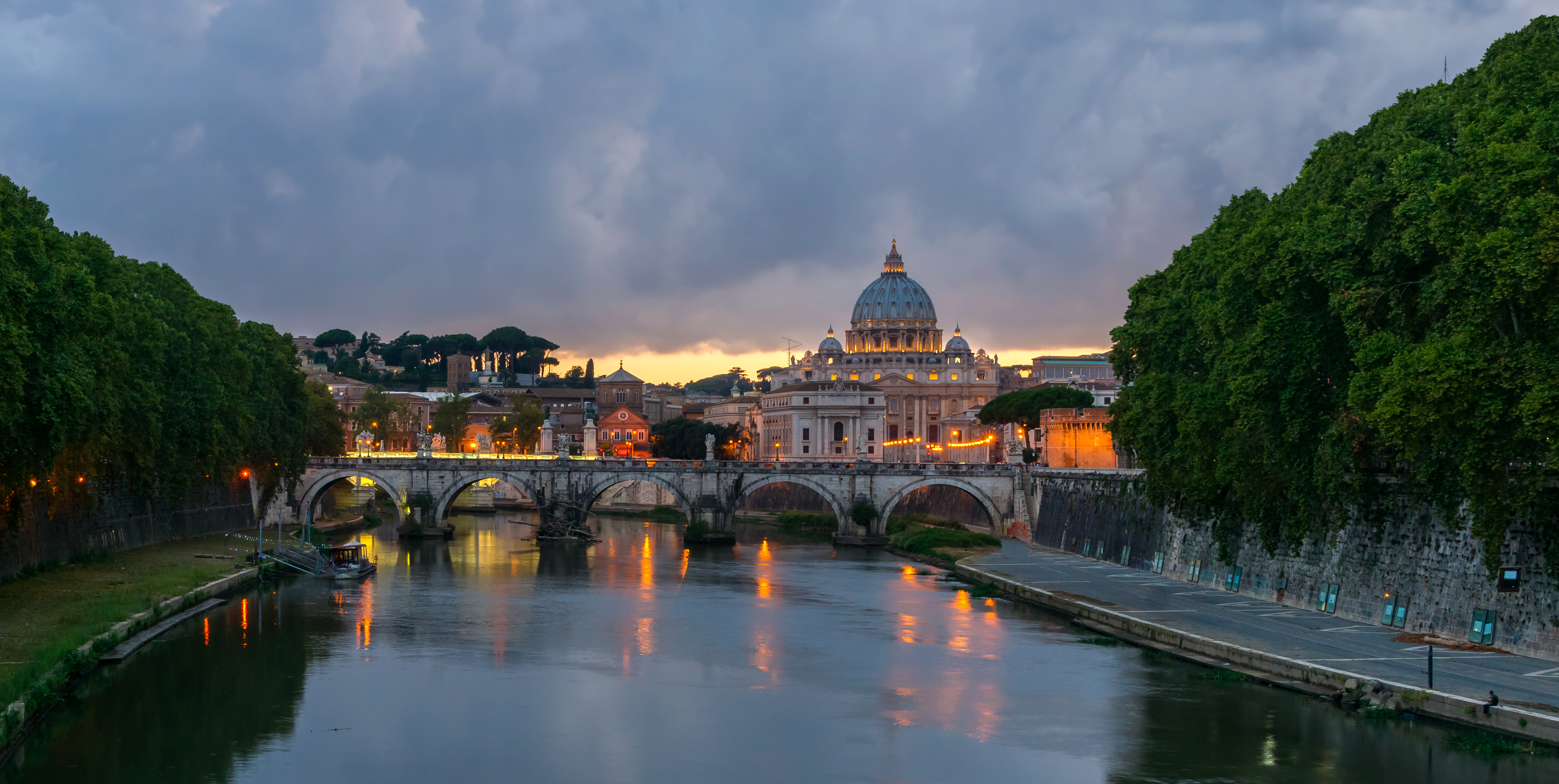
- Ponte Sant'Angelo, Rome
- Coordinates: 41°54′07″N 12°27′59″E
- Crosses: Tiber
- Locale: Rome
- Other name: Aelius Bridge

Characteristics
- Material: Masonry
- Total length: 135 m (443 ft)
- Height: 7 m (23 ft)
- No. of spans: 5

Location
- Click on the map for a fullscreen view

Ponte Sant'Angelo, originally the Aelian Bridge or Pons Aelius, is a Roman bridge in Rome, Italy, completed in 134 AD by Roman Emperor Hadrian (Publius Aelius Hadrianus), to span the Tiber from the city centre to his newly constructed mausoleum, now the towering Castel Sant'Angelo. The bridge is faced with travertine marble and spans the Tiber with five arches, three of which are Roman; it was approached by means of a ramp from the river. The bridge is now solely pedestrian and provides a scenic view of Castel Sant'Angelo. It links the rioni of Ponte (which was named after the bridge itself), and Borgo, to which the bridge administratively belongs.

== History ==
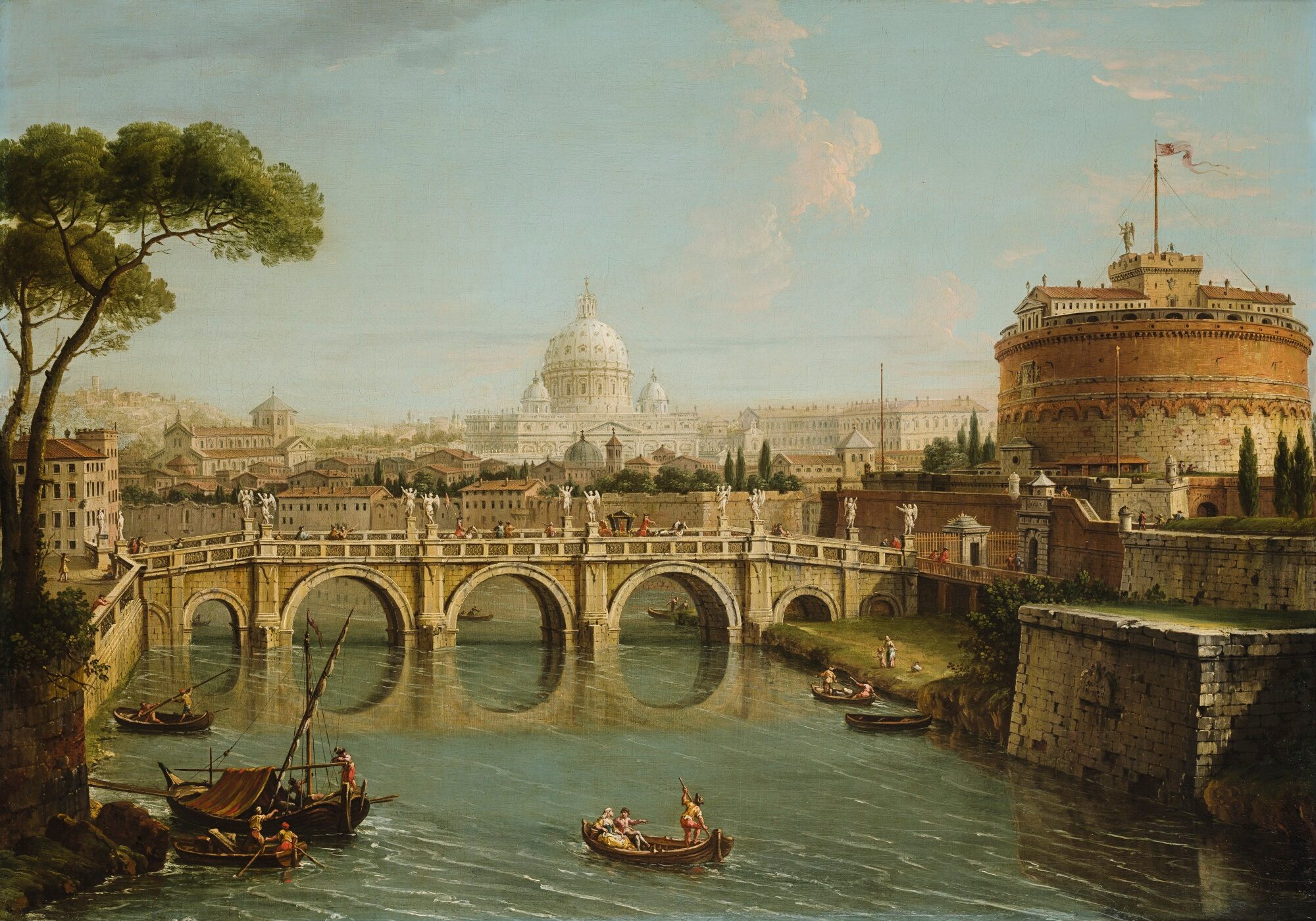
18th-century painting by Antonio Joli; note that the bridge has only three main arches, with smaller arches supporting ramps on either side. The outer arches were added in the 19th-century works that built the Lungotevere.

Starting with the early Middle Ages, the original name was forgotten: after the ruin of Nero's Bridge, pilgrims were forced to use this bridge to reach St Peter's Basilica, hence it was known also with the name of "bridge of Saint Peter" (pons Sancti Petri). In the sixth century, under Pope Gregory I, both the castle and the bridge took on the name Sant'Angelo, explained by a legend that an angel appeared on the roof of the castle to announce the end of the plague. Dante writes in his Divine Comedy that during the jubilee of 1300, due to the large number of pilgrims going and coming from Saint Peter, two separate lanes were arranged on the bridge. During the 1450 jubilee, balustrades of the bridge collapsed, due to the great crowds of the pilgrims, and many drowned in the river. In response, some houses at the head of the bridge as well as a Roman triumphal arch were pulled down in order to widen the route for pilgrims.

In 1535, Pope Clement VII allocated the toll income of the bridge to erecting the statues of the apostles Saint Peter (holding a book, with the pedestal inscription Rione XIV) by Lorenzetto, and Saint Paul (holding a broken sword and a book, with the pedestal inscription Borgo) by Paolo Romano to which subsequently the four evangelists and the patriarchs were added to other statues representing Adam, Noah, Abraham, and Moses. For centuries after the 16th century, the bridge was used to expose the bodies of those executed in the nearby Piazza di Ponte, at the left bridge head. In 1669 Pope Clement IX commissioned replacements for the aging stucco angels by Raffaello da Montelupo, commissioned by Paul III. Bernini's program, one of his last large projects, called for ten angels holding instruments of the Passion: he personally only finished the two originals of the Angel with the Superscription "I.N.R.I." and the Angel with the Crown of Thorns, but these were kept by Clement IX for his own pleasure. They are now in the church of Sant'Andrea delle Fratte, also in Rome.

At the end of the 19th century, due to the works for the construction of the Lungotevere, the two Roman ramps which linked the bridge with the two banks were demolished, and in their place two arches similar to the Roman ones were built.

For the Great Jubilee in 2000, the Lungotevere on the right bank between the bridge and the castle became a pedestrian area.

On 21 October 2019 Austrian activist Alexander Tschugguel threw five Pachamama statues, which he had stolen from a display at Santa Maria in Traspontina as part of the Amazon Synod, off of the bridge into the Tiber.

== List of angels ==
Image	Title by Sculptor	Inscription
	Angel with the Column by Antonio Raggi	Tronus meus in columna
	Angel with the Whips by Lazzaro Morelli	In flagella paratus sum
	Angel with the Crown of Thorns by Gian Lorenzo Bernini and son Paolo (original at Sant'Andrea delle Fratte, copy by Paolo Naldini)	In aerumna mea dum configitur spina
	Angel with the Sudarium (Veronica's Veil) by Cosimo Fancelli	Respice faciem Christi tui
	Angel with the Garment and Dice by Paolo Naldini	Super vestimentum meum miserunt sortem
	Angel with the Nails by Girolamo Lucenti	Aspicient ad me quem confixerunt
	Angel with the Cross by Ercole Ferrata	Cuius principatus super humerum eius
	Angel with the Superscription by Gian Lorenzo Bernini and son Paolo (original at Sant'Andrea delle Fratte, copy by Giulio Cartari	Regnavit a ligno deus.
	Angel with the Sponge by Antonio Giorgetti	Potaverunt me aceto.
	Angel with the Lance by Domenico Guidi	Vulnerasti cor meum.

== See also ==
- List of bridges in Rome
- Pons Cestius – Ancient Roman bridge in Rome
- Roman architecture
- Roman bridge
- Roman engineering

Preceded by Ponte Milvio	Landmarks of Rome; Ponte Sant'Angelo	Succeeded by Archbasilica of Saint John Lateran
