= Lungotevere dei Fiorentini =

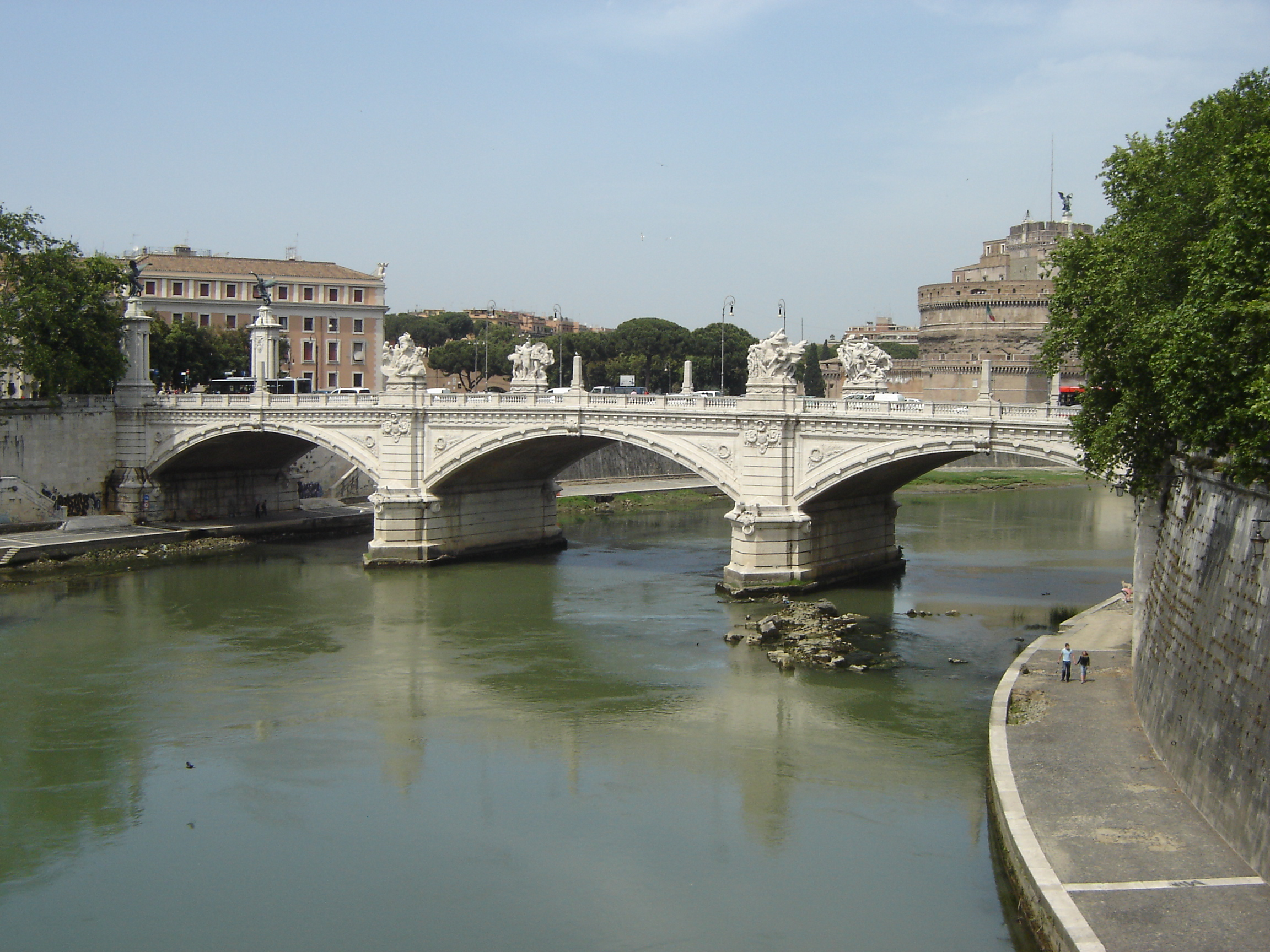
Ponte Vittorio Emanuele II; to the right, the lungotevere

Lungotevere dei Fiorentini is the stretch of the Lungotevere that connects Piazza Pasquale Paoli to Via Acciaioli, in Rome, in the rione Ponte.

The area is named after the Florentines because here, in the fifteenth century, many people moved from Florence, protected by the Medici popes Leo X and Clement VII, both coming from the Tuscan capital.

In this area the Florentines had its own tribunal, their laws, a consulate, a prison and they built their national church (the basilica of San Giovanni dei Fiorentini) and a convent, today destroyed. Moreover, in 1519 pope Leo X granted to his fellow citizens the small church of San Pantaleo juxta flumen (or San Pantaleo Affine, with meaning "ad flumen"), demolished by the Florentines to make room for the great building of San Giovanni de 'Fiorentini.

In 1863 it was built an iron bridge, also named after the Florentines, which connected the areas of the current lungoteveri dei Sangallo and Gianicolense; it was demolished in 1941, a year before the construction of the new bridge dedicated to Prince Amedeo di Savoia-Aosta, close to the previous.

== Sources ==
- Rendina, Claudio; Paradisi, Donatella. Le strade di Roma. 2nd volume E-O (2004 ed.). Newton Compton Editori, Rome. ISBN 88-541-0209-1.
