= Lungotevere Gianicolense =

- Interactive map of Lungotevere Gianicolense
- Native name: Lungotevere Gianicolense (Italian)
- Namesake: Janiculum (Gianicolo) hill
- Type: Lungotevere
- Location: Trastevere, Rome, Italy
- From: Piazza della Rovere
- Major junctions: Via della Lungara (parallel)
- To: Ponte Mazzini

Construction
- Inauguration: July 20, 1887

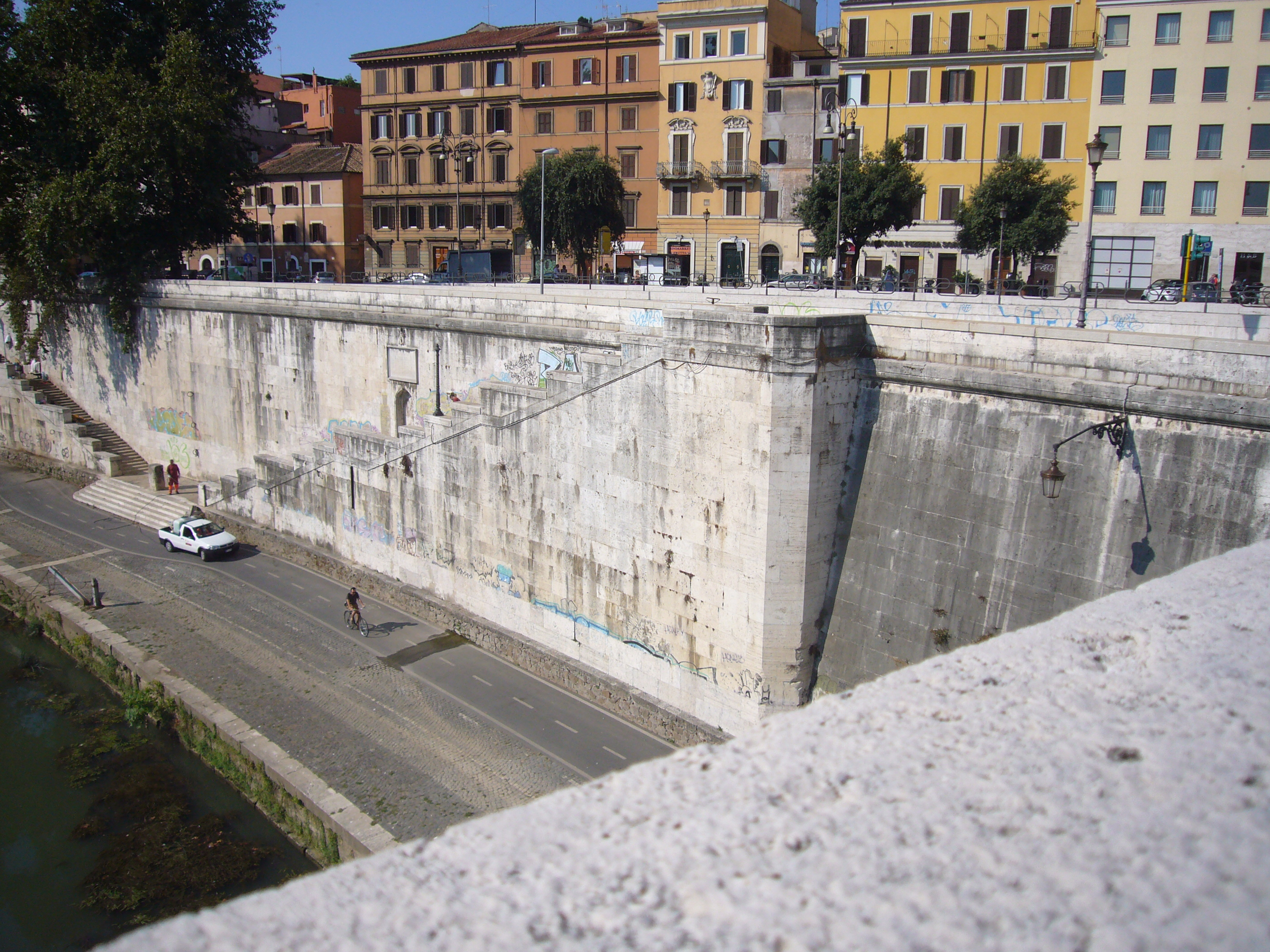
Lungotevere Gianicolense close to Piazza della Rovere, with the staircases of the former Leonine Harbour

Lungotevere Gianicolense is the stretch of Lungotevere that links Piazza della Rovere to Ponte Mazzini in Rome (Italy), in the Rione Trastevere.

The Lungotevere takes its name from the Janiculum hill, rising within the Rione; it has been established on July 20, 1887.

In the area of the present Lungotevere, not far from Palazzo Salviati, formerly rose the Leonine Harbour, erected by Pope Leo XII in 1827 and used for ships docking and goods unloading; it was destroyed in 1863.

Together with the harbour, a fountain was erected: it was transferred to Piazza Pietro d'Illiria during the building of the muraglioni (massive walls) of the Lungotevere. In its place, two drinking fountains were realized, about halfway the staircases going down to the river: they are idle since 1950.

This is one of the stretches of Lungotevere that mainly show the superelevation in respect with the historic streets along the river (in this case, Via della Lungara); another one is Lungotevere Tor di Nona.

== Bibliography ==
- Rendina, Claudio; Paradisi, Donatella (2004). Le strade di Roma. Second volume E-O. Rome: Newton Compton Editori. ISBN 88-541-0209-1.
