= Lippy =

Lippy may refer to:

== People ==
=== Nickname ===
- Philip Deignan (born 1983), Irish road racing cyclist
- Leo Durocher (1905–1991), American Major League Baseball player, manager and coach, member of the Baseball Hall of Fame
- Alexander Lipmann-Kessel (1914–1986), South African orthopaedic surgeon and Second World War medical officer
- Lippy Lipshitz (1903–1980), South African sculptor, painter and printmaker
- Dolly Vanderlip (born 1937), American former pitcher in the All-American Girls Professional Baseball League

=== Surname ===
- Bill Lippy, member of the International Jewish Sports Hall of Fame as an official/administrator
- T. S. Lippy (1860–1931), American millionaire and philanthropist who struck it rich in the Klondike Gold Rush

== Fictional characters ==
- Lippy the Lion, a Hanna-Barbera cartoon character
- Lippy, twin brother of Zippy the Pinhead, a comic strip character
- Lippy Jones, in the American miniseries Lonesome Dove and Return to Lonesome Dove

== Other uses ==
- slang for lipstick
- Forpet or lippy, an old Scottish unit of dry measure

== See also ==
- Lippi, an Italian surname
- Lipy (disambiguation), several places in Poland
