= Lungotevere dei Sangallo =

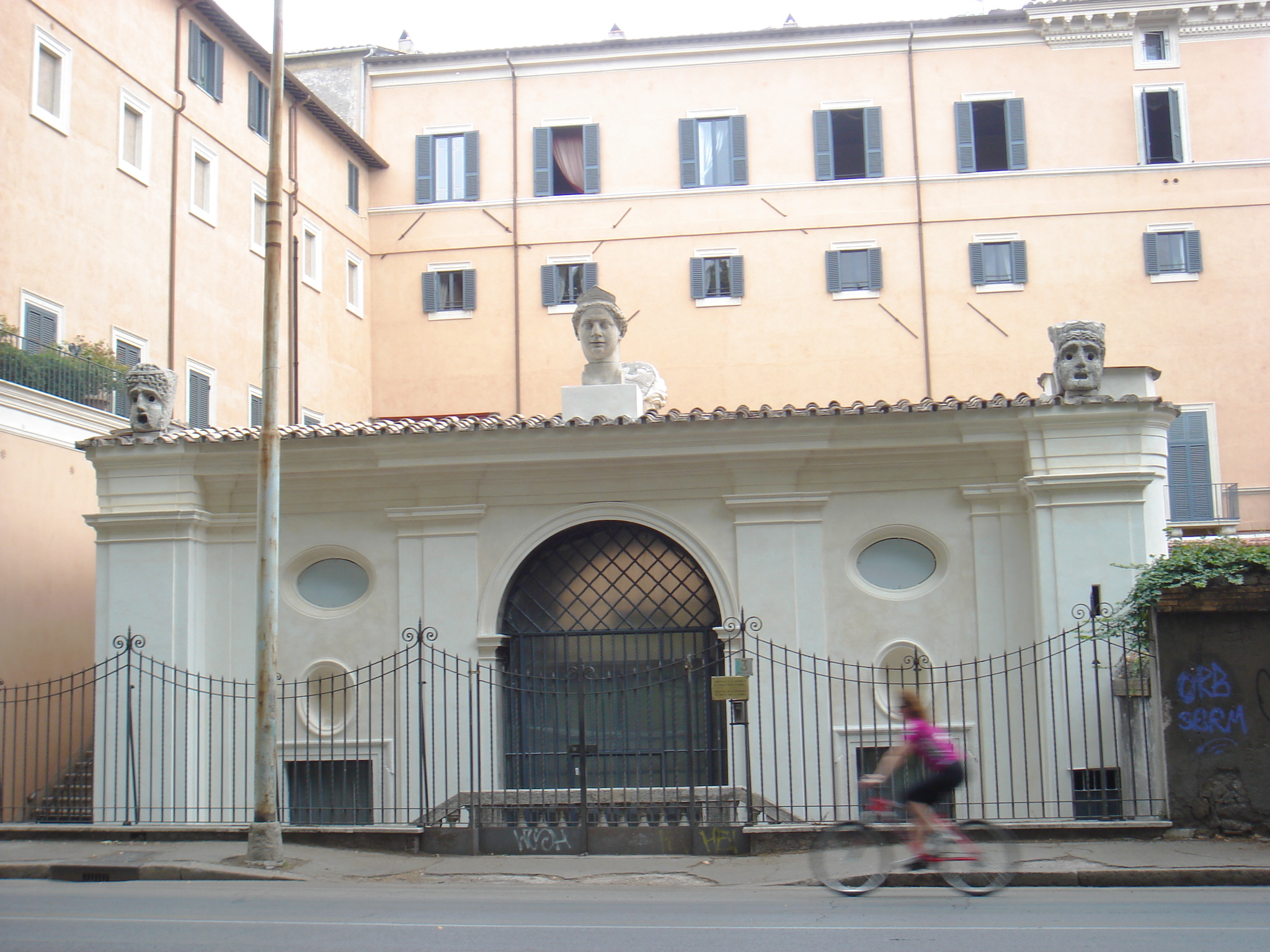
- Interactive map of Lungotevere dei Sangallo
- Namesake: The Sangallo family of architects
- Type: Lungotevere
- Location: Rome, Italy
- Quarter: Ponte and Regola
- Coordinates: 41.8967°N 12.4642°E
- From: Ponte Mazzini
- To: Ponte Principe Amedeo Savoia Aosta

Construction
- Inauguration: July 20, 1887

Lungotevere dei Sangallo is the stretch of lungotevere between ponte Mazzini and ponte Principe Amedeo Savoia Aosta, in Rome, rioni Ponte and Regola.

This lungotevere is dedicated to the four Sangallo (Antonio Giamberti, Giuliano, Francesco and Antonio Cordiani), florentine, all architects active in Rome during the Renaissance. It was instituted with law of 20 July 1887.

On the road one can see the rear of some palaces whose main facade lie along via Giulia or along adjacent blocks: the Carceri Nuove, the Oratorio del Gonfalone, Palazzo Sacchetti, via Bravarìa.

== Sources ==
- Rendina, Claudio; Paradisi, Donatella (2004). Le strade di Roma. 3rd volume P-Z. Newton Compton Editori, Rome. ISBN 88-541-0209-1.
