= Palazzo Salviati (Rome) =

Coordinates: 41.898371°N 12.463071°E

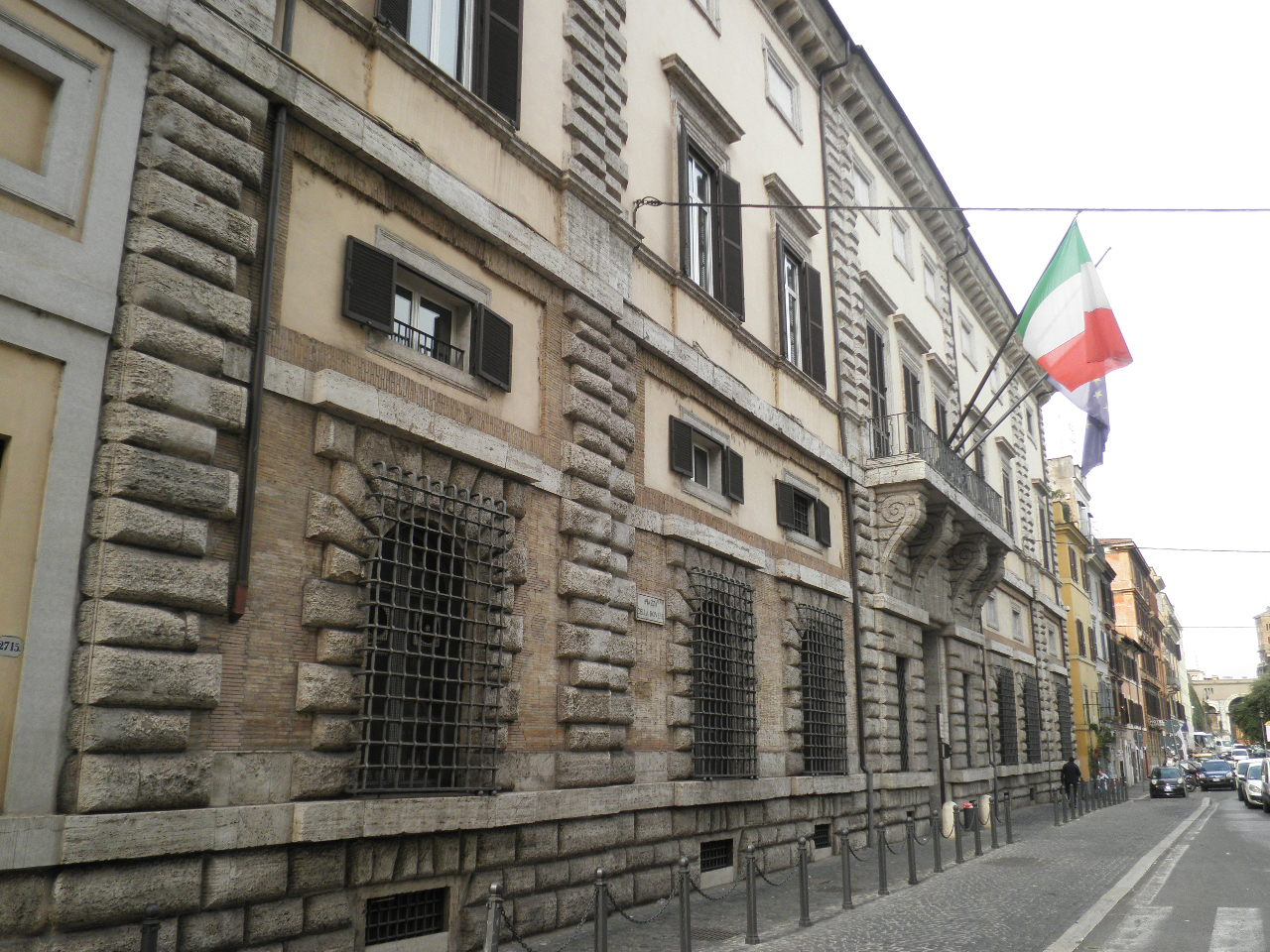
- Rome, Palazzo Salviati alla Lungara
- Interactive map of Palazzo Salviati

General information
- Location: Rome, Italy

Palazzo Salviati (formerly Adimari) is a palace in Rome (Italy), Via della Lungara 82-83.

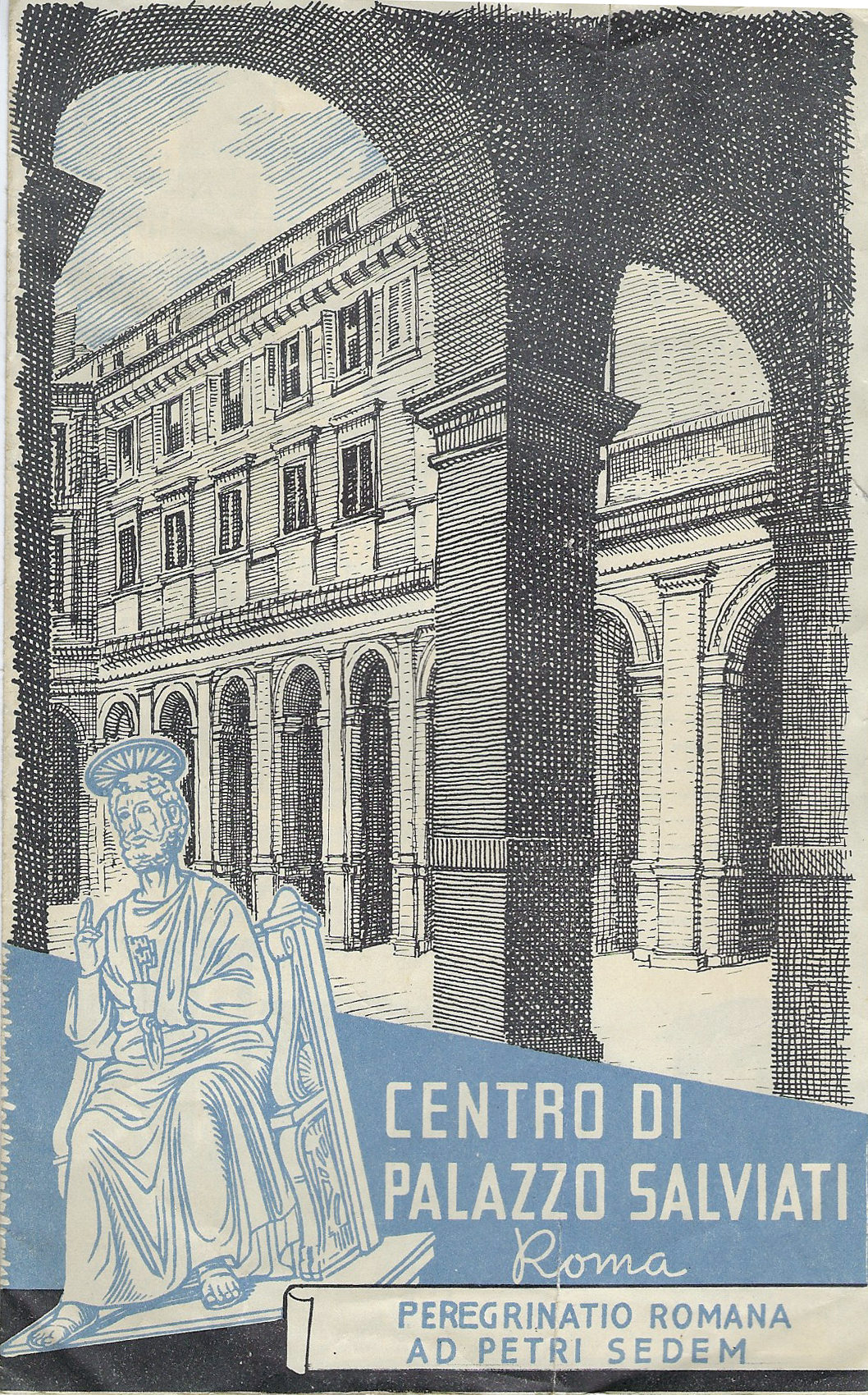
Flyer of the Palazzo Salvati as reception center for pilgrims of the Holy Year 1950

== History ==
The palace was built in the first half of 16th century by Filippo Adimari, Camerlengo of Pope Leo X, on a plot of land for vineyard owned by Orazio Farnese.

It is one of the greatest juvenile works by Giulio Romano. The long façade is symmetrically divided into five sections by vertical bossages; the big gate in the middle is surmounted by a balcony that lies on big shelves. At the first floor, Giulio Romano also designed a chapel in Bramante's style.

In 1552 the palace was sold to Cardinal Giovanni Salviati and soon after its property was transferred to his brother Bernardo Salviati, Prior of the Order of Malta; in 1569 it was refurbished by Nanni di Baccio Bigio, who completed the elevation to its present aspect and enlarged the rear. The edifice was the residence of Cardinal Fulvio Giulio della Corgna, nephew of Pope Julius III, until his death in 1583: in 1571 his famous warrior brother Ascanio della Corgna, coming back from the battle of Lepanto, died in the palace.

In 1794 the palace passed to the House of Borghese and, after other transfers of property (Paccanari, Lavaggi), in 1840 it was bought by the Papal State and used as the seat of the city archive and of a botanical garden.

After the expropriation on behalf of the Italian State in 1870, the palace housed the military court and the military college. In 1933 the courtyard was closed by a new wing. A shrine commemorates the military institution, now suppressed.

During World War II, in the period of the Nazi occupation, the rooms of the military college were used to lock in for some days (from 16 to 17 October 1943) a thousand Jews captured during the roundput in the Roman ghetto, before they were deported.

The palace now houses the Istituto Alti Studi per la Difesa, with an important library specialized in military and geopolitical disciplines.

In front of Palazzo Salviati formerly rose the Trastevere headboard of the Ponte dei Fiorentini, an iron suspension bridge built in 1863 close to the church of San Giovanni dei Fiorentini as an additional connection between the historic centre and the new quarter of Prati, then under construction. It was a toll bridge, realised by a French private company, and the toll booth rose close to Palazzo Salviati; the transit costed 20 cents (1 soldo), so the bridge was popularly known as Ponte del Soldino ("Bridge of the Little Soldo"). It was demolished in 1941 and replaced one year later by Ponte Principe Amedeo Savoia Aosta.

For some time in the 1950s, Foyer Unitas occupied a space in the Palazzo Salviati.

== Bibliography ==
- Gabriele Morolli (editor), Palazzo Salviati alla Lungara, Editalia, Rome 1991.
- Touring Club Italiano, Roma, Milan 2004, p. 585
