= Carceri Nuove =

Jail built by Pope Innocent X

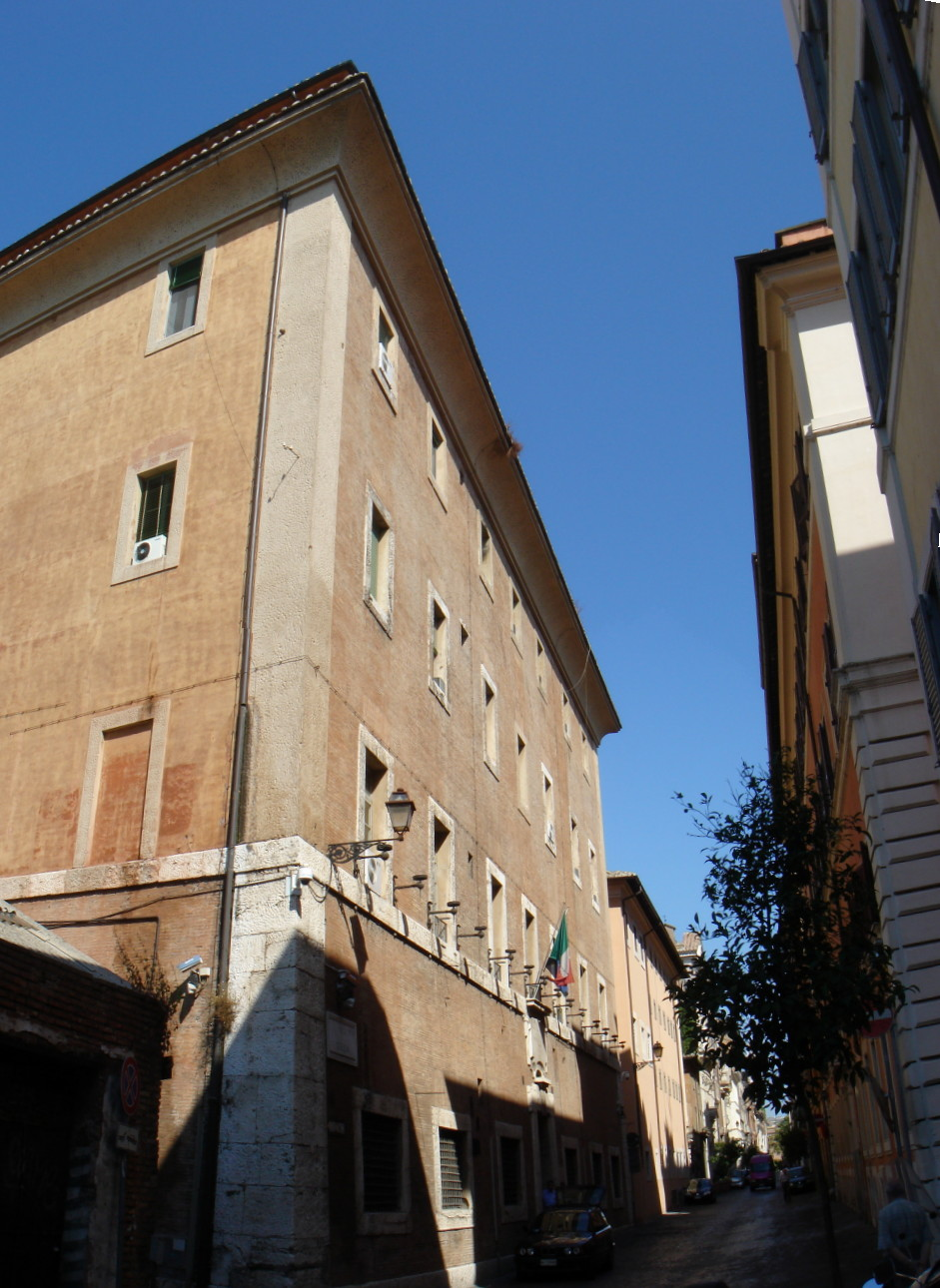
- The facade of the Carceri Nuove along Via Giulia

- Location within Rome

General information
- Type: Jail
- Architectural style: Baroque
- Location: Rome, Via Giulia 52
- Coordinates: 41°53′50″N 12°28′01″E
- Groundbreaking: 1652
- Completed: 1655
- Client: Pope Innocent X

Technical details
- Material: brick, travertine, stucco

Design and construction
- Architect: Antonio Del Grande

The Carceri Nuove ([ˈkartʃeri ˈnwɔːve]; "New Jails") was a prison built in the mid-17th century at the instigation of Pope Innocent X and his ideals of humanity and clemency. The New Jails were to replace other prisons throughout the city. This jail remained in operation until the construction of the judicial prison of Regina Coeli in Trastevere at the turn of the 20th century. The building, in 2020, housed the Direzione Nazionale Antimafia e Antiterrorismo (English: National Anti-Mafia and Counter-Terrorism Directorate).

== Location ==
The building is in Rome, in the Regola Rione, about halfway down Via Giulia (at n. 52), in an area cleared by demolitions which started in 1938 for the construction of a road between ponte Mazzini bridge and Corso Vittorio Emanuele. The road was never built because of the war. To the south the jail borders with vicolo delle prigioni and to the north with vicolo della scimia.

== History ==
The Carceri Nuove were built between 1652 and 1655 at the will of Pope Innocent X Pamphilj (r. 1644-1655) by Antonio Del Grande. The pope had seen, while he was Uditore of the Sacra Rota tribunal, the inhuman conditions in which the prisoners of Tor di Nona jail lived. Once he arrived at Papal throne, he decided to alleviate their condition by building a new prison.

The English College protested the pontifical intention to confiscate houses of the college to enlarge the prisons of Corte Savella. Virgilio Spada, "deputato sopra la Congregazione delle Carceri di casa Giulia" and brother of Cardinal Bernardino, had the survey of Corte Savella carried out and commissioned Del Grande to draw up a restructuring project, but Innocent X decided to build a new prison between Via Giulia, the Tiber and Piazza Padella. This jail replaced those that had existed until then in the city: Tor di Nona in Ponte, Corte Savella in Regola, and the jail in Borgo. The Carceri Nuove were the first examples in Rome of modern penitentiary, where the humanity of the inmates was considered important. The philosophy that created this prison was inscribed on the front door:

IVSTITIAE ET CLEMENTIAE / SECVRIORI AC MITIORI REORVM CVSTODIAE / NOVVM CARCEREM / INNOCENTIVS X PONT. MAX / POSVIT / ANNO DOMINI / MDCLV

Innocent X Pontifex Maximus erected in the year of the Lord 1655 the new prison for justice, for clemency and for a safer and more humane custody of the guilty

When the pope died in January 1655 the building was not complete, but his successor Alexander VII (r. 1655-1667) completed its construction. However, before its inauguration the building was used during the 1656 plague epidemic as a stufa (from the German word stube -something between a Roman bath and a modern sauna) where those who were in quarantine in San Pancrazio and Sant'Eusebio were washed.

The inmates were continuously assisted by members of the Archconfraternities of San Giovanni della Pigna, the Assunta at the Gesù and San Girolamo della Carità. The Carceri Nuove remained operative until the inauguration of the Regina Coeli Prison at Via della Lungara, being used for preventive custody. After that, only minors were kept there. In 1931 the edifice became the seat of the Centro per Studi Penitenziari and the Museo di Criminologia. Later the building became the seat of the United Nations Research Institute for Social Defence. Now (2020) it houses the Direzione Nazionale Antimafia e Antiterrorismo ("National Anti-Mafia and Counter-Terrorism Directorate").

== Architecture ==
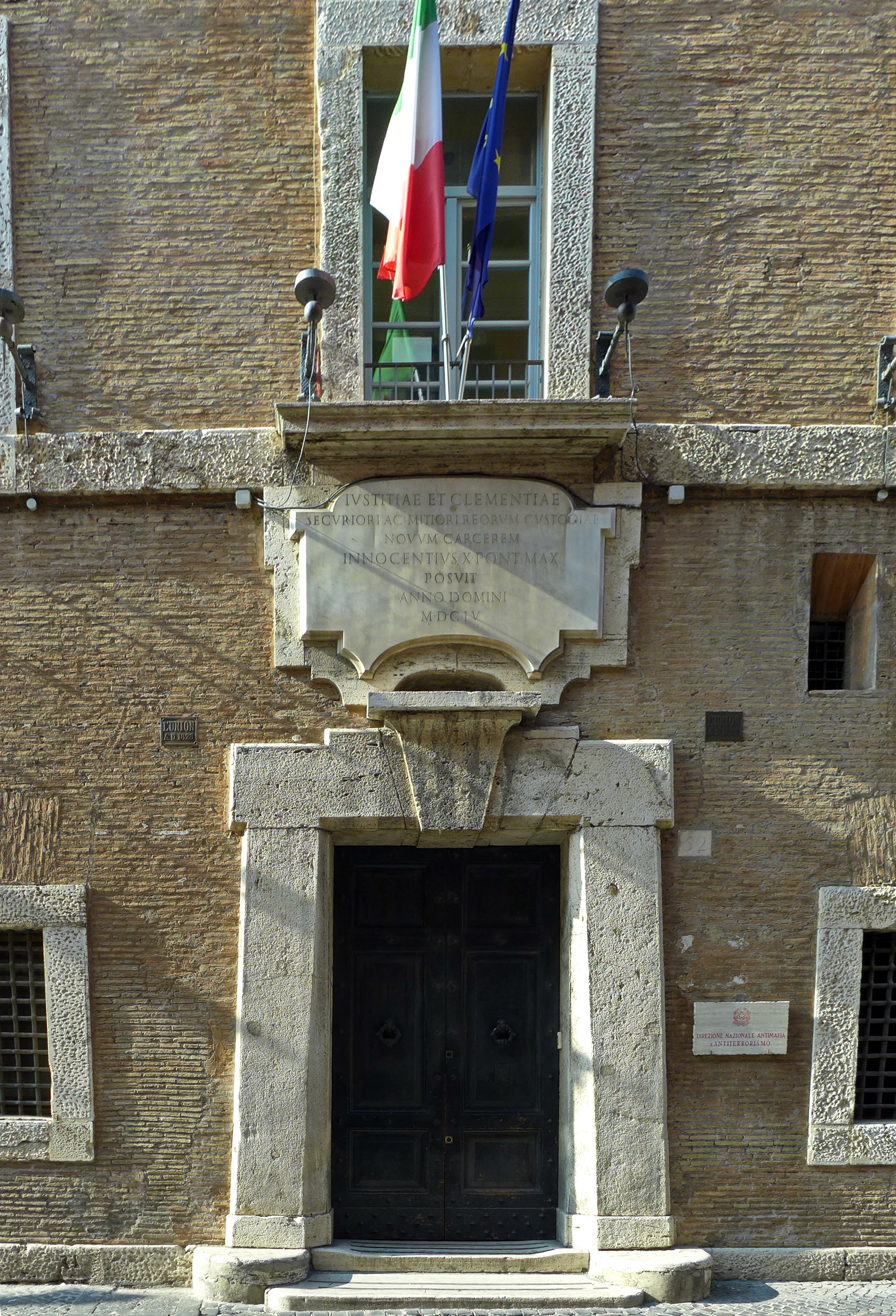
The severe portal of the Carceri Nuove on Via Giulia

The building, considered until the 18th century a model humanitarian prison, was designed by Del Grande following a detailed program of Virgilio Spada and keeping in mind the prisons of Tordinona. It was organized in two blocks: one of the representations and the parlors, on Via Giulia, and the other of the dungeons towards the Tiber; the two bodies are connected by a gallery open on the side courtyards. It is possible that the planimetric shape - similar to a sword coming out of a hilt - represents an allegory either of the justice of Pope Innocent or of Virgilio Spada ("Sword" in English) himself, superintendent of the construction.

The building is built with bricks with overhang in rustic travertine or stucco. It has 4 floors with 6 windows each on the main facade along Via Giulia. On the ground floor the windows are rectangular and equipped with grilles. At the center of the ground floor there is a strongly tapered portal with at the center of the lintel a large bugna surmounted by the inscription cited above. The imposing building is concluded by a large groove cornice.

=== Interior layout ===
The jail had two courtyards, a large staircase, and five floors. On the ground floor were the rooms where men and women were interrogated, the lodgings of the caretakers, the chancellery, the services, a courtyard for exercise, two larghe (large rooms) for those accused of serious crimes, two punishment chambers, a juvenile prison and a chapel.

On the first floor there were: two larghe for prisoners already sentenced, detained for debt and those accused of minor crimes; rooms for civilians accused of petty crimes; a room for Jews; the archive and a second chapel.

On the second floor lay a room reserved for the so-called visita graziosa ("gracious visit") of the commission for the welfare of inmates set up in 1435 by Pope Eugene IV: then there was the chaplain's room, the conforteria (the place where those condemned to death received the comforts of religion), a chapel for those condemned to the death penalty and an isolation room for those sick of mange.

The third and fourth floors were occupied by seventeen dungeons, each one bearing the name of a saint. They were accessed through very low doors, and each one was illuminated by a narrow window at the top protected by a double grille. The dungeons were reserved for inmates before and during the trial.

In the women's sector there were three larghe on the first floor and three dungeons on the second floor, the chapel, the infirmary and the apartment of the Priora.

Until the pontificate of Leo XII (r. 1823-1829) the prisons had also chambers for the clergymen; afterwards, these were imprisoned in special rooms in Castel Sant'Angelo. In 1824 a large kitchen was built on the ground floor, while the women's prison was extended to the second floor.

In 1842 the Carceri Nuove housed 680 inmates, 600 men and 80 women.

== Bibliography ==
- Baronio, Cesare (1697). Descrizione di Roma moderna (in Italian). M.A. and P.A. De Rossi, Roma.
- Pietrangeli, Carlo (1979). Guide rionali di Roma (in Italian). Vol. Regola (III) (2 ed.). Roma: Fratelli Palombi Editori.
- Tafuri, Manfredo (1988). "Antonio Del Grande". Dizionario Biografico degli Italiani (in Italian). Vol. 36.
- Paita, Almo (1998). La vita quotidiana a Roma ai tempi di Gian Lorenzo Bernini (in Italian). Milano: Rizzoli. ISBN 8817172308.
