= Lippi =

Lippi is an Italian surname. Notable people with the surname include:

- Annibale Lippi (16th century, d. after 18 November 1581), architect, son of Nanni di Baccio Bigio
- Antonio Lippi (1900–1957) Italian high speed aviator
- Claudio Lippi (born 1945), Italian television presenter, actor and singer
- Claudio Lippi (journalist) (1970–2013), Italian journalist
- Filippino Lippi (1457–1504), Italian painter, son of Filippo
- Filippo Lippi (c.1406–1469), Italian painter
- Giovanni Lippi (c.1507–1768), architect, best known as Nanni di Baccio Bigio
- Lorenzo Lippi (1606–1665), Italian painter and poet
- Marcello Lippi (born 1948), Italian football manager
- Roberto Lippi (1926–2011), Italian racing driver
- Rosina Lippi (born 1956), American writer

== See also ==
- Fra Lippo Lippi, an 1855 dramatic monologue written by the Victorian poet Robert Browning
