= Santa Croce alla Lungara =

Church building in Rome, Italy

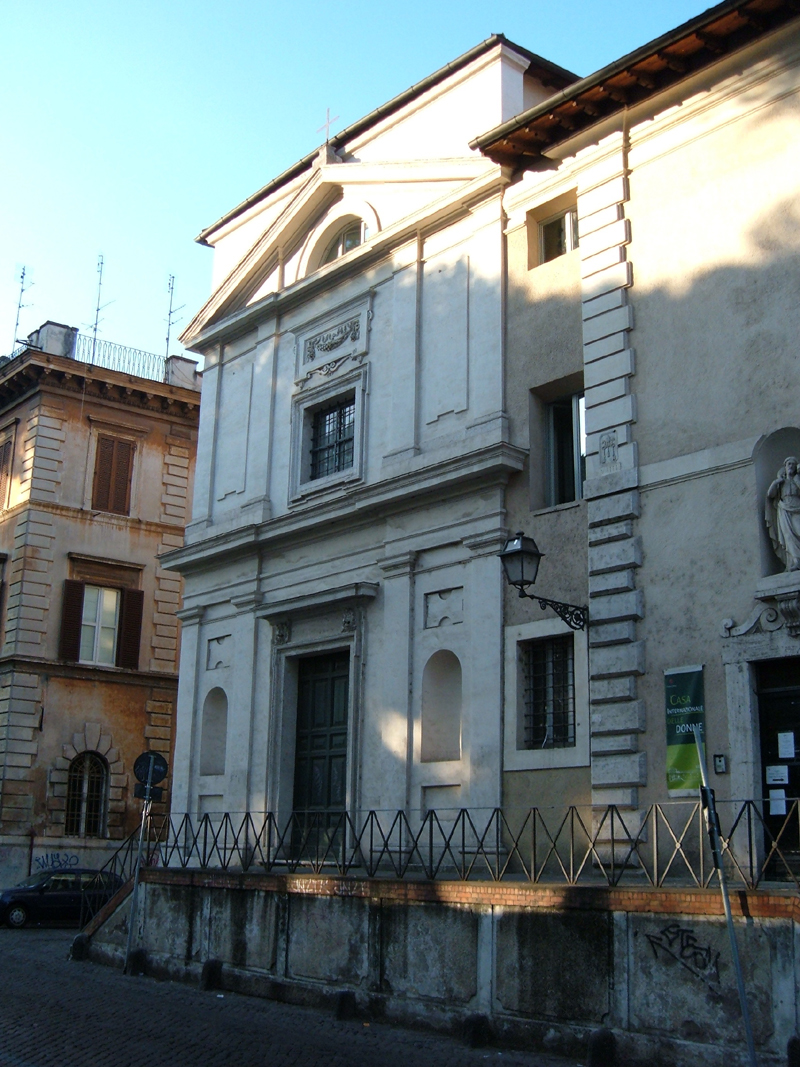
- Façade
- Click on the map for a fullscreen view
- 41°53′40″N 12°27′58″E
- Location: Rome
- Country: Italy
- Denomination: Catholic
- Tradition: Latin

Architecture
- Architectural type: Church
- Completed: 1619

Administration
- District: Lazio
- Province: Rome

Santa Croce alla Lungara is a church in Rome (Italy), in the Rione Trastevere, facing on Via della Lungara. It is also called Santa Croce delle Scalette', due to the presence of a double flight of stairs (Italian: scale) giving access from the street; or Buon Pastore, since in the 19th century the church and the annexed cloister were entrusted to the Sisters of the Good Shepherd of Angers.

The church was built in 1619 thanks to the subsidies of the Duke of Bavaria and of Cardinal Antonio Barberini, the brother of Pope Urban VIII; the cloister dates back to 1615 and was founded by the carmelite Domenico di Gesù e Maria "in order to take the indecent women away from sin" (Armellini).

The interior of the church shows a single nave and has been altered in the 19th century with a quite neoclassical style. The high altar housed a painting portraying Jesus bearing the cross, now replaced with a Crucifix by Francesco Troppa; the same author also painted the Annunciation on the right altar. Another noteworthy work is Mary Magdalene by Ciccio da Napoli.

The annexed cloister, enlarged in the 19th century by Virginio Vespignani, always maintained its function as a redemption or rehabilitation house; in 1950, when the nuns left the institute, the building became a detachment of the women's prison for misdemeanors. This use ended in 1979 and now the cloister houses the Casa Internazionale delle Donne.

== Bibliography ==
- M. Armellini, Le chiese di Roma dal secolo IV al XIX, Rome 1891
- C. Rendina, Le Chiese di Roma, Newton & Compton Editori, Milan 2000, p. 79-82
- G. Carpaneto, Rione XIII Trastevere, in VV.AA, I rioni di Roma, Newton & Compton Editori, Milan 2000, Vol. III, pp. 831–923
- Casa Internazionale delle Donne, official site
