= Lungotevere della Farnesina =

Street in Rome, Italy

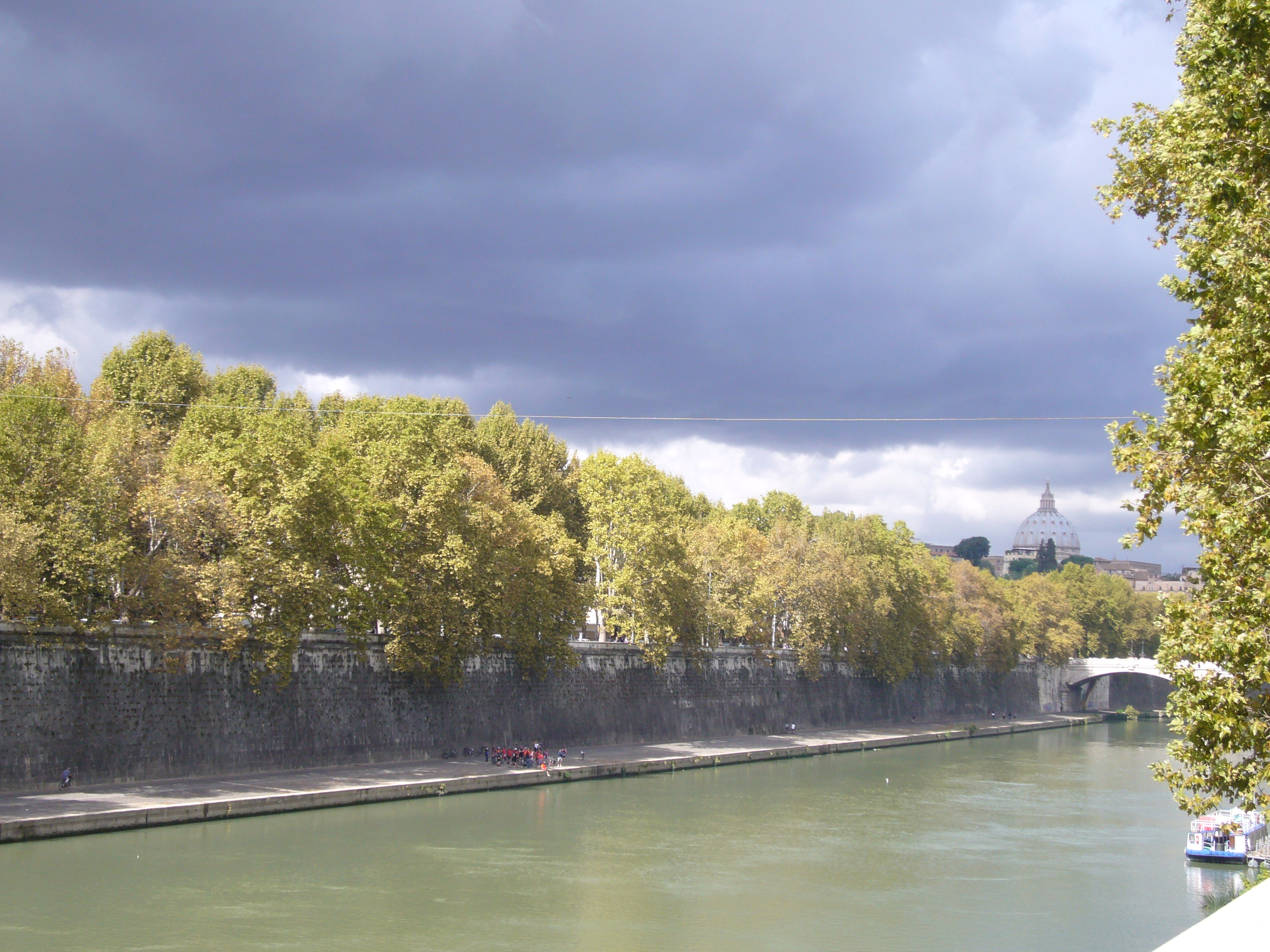
Lungotevere della Farnesina

Lungotevere della Farnesina is the stretch of Lungotevere that links Piazza Trilussa to Ponte Giuseppe Mazzini in Rome (Italy), in the Rione Trastevere.

The Lungotevere takes its name from villa Farnesina, the present seat of the Accademia dei Lincei.

The works for the building of the Lungotevere, in 1879, brought to light the sepulchre of Gaius Sulpicius Platorinus, dating back to the 1st century; after being reconstructed, it was moved to the National Roman Museum within the Baths of Diocletian.

== Bibliography ==
- Rendina, Claudio; Paradisi, Donatella (2004). Le strade di Roma. 2nd Volume E-O. Rome: Newton Compton Editori. ISBN 88-541-0209-1.
