= San Biagio della Pagnotta =

- Church of Saint Blaise of the Loaf
- Chiesa di San Biagio degli Armeni
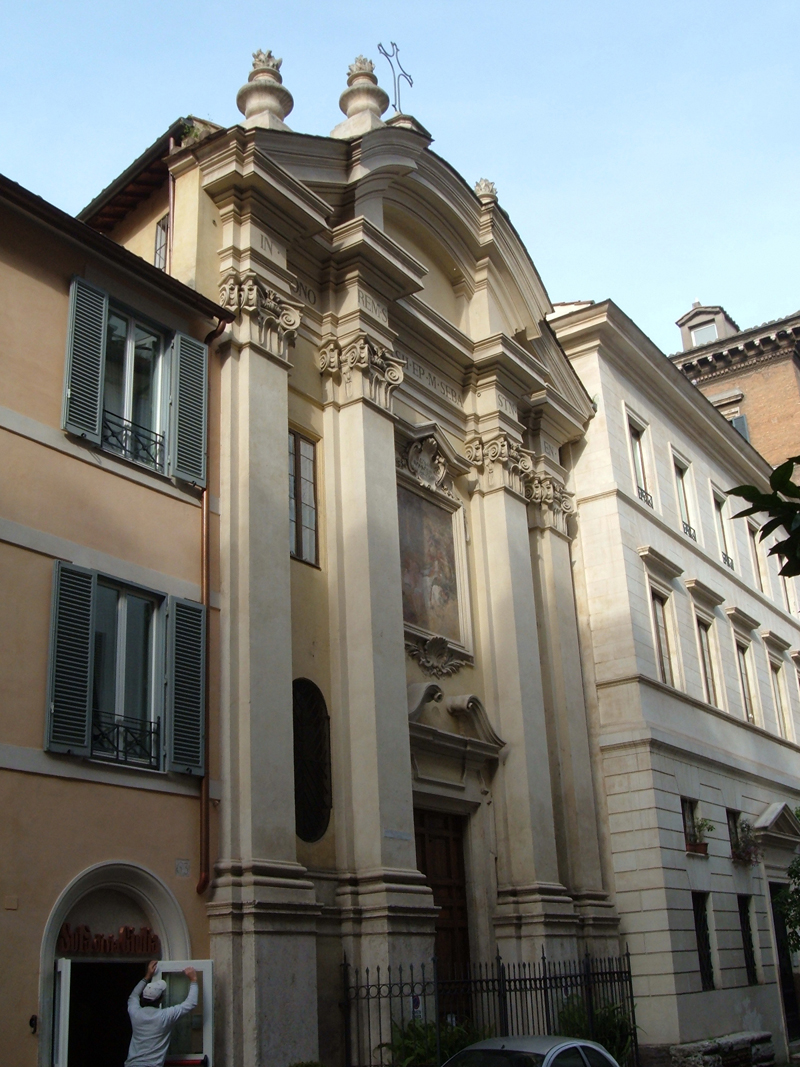
- Click on the map for a fullscreen view
- 41°53′54″N 12°27′58″E
- Location: 64 Via Giulia, Ponte, Rome
- Country: Italy
- Language: Armenian
- Denomination: Armenian Catholic Church
- Tradition: Armenian Rite

History
- Status: national church
- Dedication: Blaise of Sebaste

Architecture
- Functional status: active
- Architectural type: Baroque
- Groundbreaking: 11th century
- Completed: 1832

Administration
- Diocese: Rome

San Biagio della Pagnotta or San Biagio degli Armeni is a church in Rome, in the Ponte district, on via Giulia, near Palazzo Sacchetti. It is dedicated to Saint Blaise and is the national church of the Armenian community in Rome.

== History ==
The church is frequently recorded in medieval catalogues. It originated before the 10th century, but is first recorded in a 1072 inscription preserved inside it, which records that Domenico, abbot of the adjoining monastery (now a hotel), rebuilt the church under pope Alexander II.

The church was rebuilt in the 18th century, including its present facade by Giovanni Antonio Perfetti - at its top is a fresco of Saint Blaise's miracle. The interior was rebuilt in the first part of the 19th century by Filippo Navone. It houses the relic of the throat of Saint Blaise as well as a Pietro da Cortona painting of angels adoring the Holy Sacrament and a painting of the Madonna delle Grazie which was Canonically crowned in 1671. In 1836 Pope Gregory XVI gave the church to the Armenians as their national church.

== Bibliography ==
- Mariano Armellini, Le chiese di Roma dal secolo IV al XIX, Roma 1891, pp. 355–357
- Christian Hulsen, Le chiese di Roma nel Medio Evo, Firenze 1927, pp. 214–216
- Filippo Titi, Descrizione delle Pitture, Sculture e Architetture esposte in Roma, Roma 1763, p. 421
- Claudio Rendina, Le Chiese di Roma, Newton & Compton Editori, Milano 2000
- Claudia Cerchiai, Rione V Ponte, in AA.VV, I rioni di Roma, Newton & Compton Editori, Milano 2000, Vol. I, pp. 335–382
