= Giacomo Rocca =

Italian painter

Giacomo Rocca (or Giacomo della Rocca) (died between 1592 and 1605) was an Italian painter of the late Renaissance or Mannerist period. He was a pupil of Daniele da Volterra, and aided in the completion of frescoes for the first chapel on the right of Santa Maria degli Angeli in Rome. Rocca's biography is sketched in Giovanni Baglione's Le vite de' pittori, scultori et architetti dal pontificato di Gregorio XIII del 1572 in fino a tempi di Papa Urbano VIII nel 1642.

== Works ==
- Frescoes in the Ricci Chapel, San Pietro in Montorio
- Prophets and Sibyls and Subjects in the Old Testament, frescoes at the Galleria and the Palazzo Sacchetti chapel in Rome
- Roman Triumphs, frescoes (worked with Michele degli Alberti) at the Palazzo dei Conservatori, Rome
