= Sangallo =

Sangallo is the surname of a Florentine family, several members of which became distinguished in the fine arts, including:

- Giuliano da Sangallo (1445–1516), Italian sculptor, architect and military engineer
- Antonio da Sangallo the Elder (c. 1453 – 1534), younger brother of Giuliano
- Francesco da Sangallo (1493–1570), the son of Giuliano
- Bastiano da Sangallo (1481–1551), a nephew of Giuliano and Antonio
- Antonio da Sangallo the Younger (1484–1546), a nephew of Giuliano and Antonio
