= Villa Medici =

Historic house in Rome, Italy

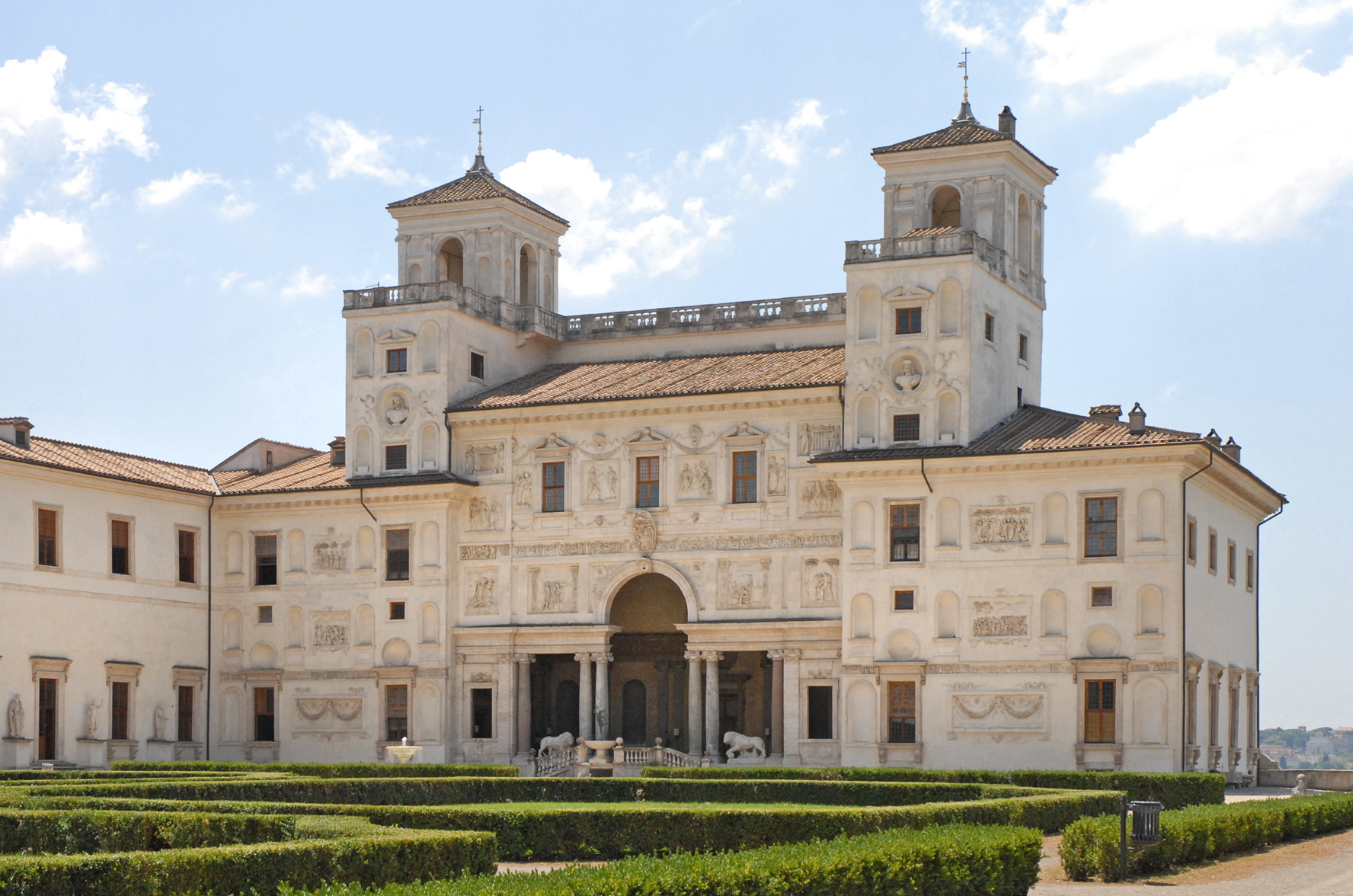
- Villa Medici in Rome
- Click on the map for a fullscreen view

General information
- Type: Museum
- Location: Rome, Italy
- Coordinates: 41°54′28.8″N 12°28′58.8″E
- Current tenants: French Academy in Rome
- Completed: 1544
- Owner: Government of France

Design and construction
- Architect: Annibale Lippi

The Villa Medici (Italian pronunciation: [ˈvilla ˈmɛːditʃi]) is a sixteenth-century Italian Mannerist villa and an architectural complex with 7-hectare Italian garden, contiguous with the more extensive Borghese gardens, on the Pincian Hill next to Trinità dei Monti in the historic centre of Rome, Italy.

The Villa Medici, founded by Ferdinando I de' Medici, Grand Duke of Tuscany and now property of the French State, has housed the French Academy in Rome and has welcomed winners of the Prix de Rome since 1803, to promote and represent artistic creation in all its fields, an instance being the musical evocation of its garden fountains features in Ottorino Respighi's Fountains of Rome.

The Villa Medici lies within the historic district of Rome, inside the perimeter walls built by Emperor Aurelian in the third century, and the Gianicolense walls built by Pope Urban VIII in 1643, which was declared a World Heritage Site by the United Nations Educational, Scientific and Cultural Organization (UNESCO) in 1980, though it is not specifically identified amongst the mostly Roman-era monuments of that listing, and it is not part of the UNESCO World Heritage Site the "Medici Villas and Gardens in Tuscany," ascribed in 2013.

== History ==
In ancient times, the site of the Villa Medici was part of the gardens of Lucullus, which passed into the hands of the Imperial family with Messalina, who was murdered in the villa.

In 1564, when the nephews of Cardinal Giovanni Ricci of Montepulciano acquired the property, it had long been abandoned to viticulture. The sole dwelling was the Casina of Cardinale Marcello Crescenzi, who had maintained a vineyard here and had begun improvements to the villa under the direction of the Florentine Nanni Lippi, who had died however before work had proceeded far. The new proprietors commissioned Annibale Lippi, the late architect's son, to continue work, with involvement of Michelangelo that is traditional lore, but undocumented.

In 1576, the property was acquired by Cardinal Ferdinando de' Medici, who finished the structure to designs by Bartolomeo Ammanati. The Villa Medici became the first among Medici properties in Rome, intended to give concrete expression to the ascendancy of the Medici among Italian princes and assert their permanent presence in Rome. Under the Cardinal's insistence, Ammanati incorporated into the design Roman bas-reliefs and statues that were coming to sight with almost every spadeful of earth, with the result that the facades of the Villa Medici, as it now was, became a virtual open-air museum. A series of grand gardens recalled the botanical gardens created at Pisa and at Florence by the Cardinal's father Cosimo I de' Medici, sheltered in plantations of pines, cypresses and oaks. Ferdinando de' Medici had a studiolo, a retreat for study and contemplation, built to the north east of the garden above the Aurelian wall. Now, these rooms look onto Borghese Gardens but would then have had views over the Roman countryside. These two rooms were only uncovered in 1985 by the restorer Geraldine Albers: the concealing whitewash had protected and conserved the superb fresco decoration carried out by Jacopo Zucchi in 1576 and 1577.

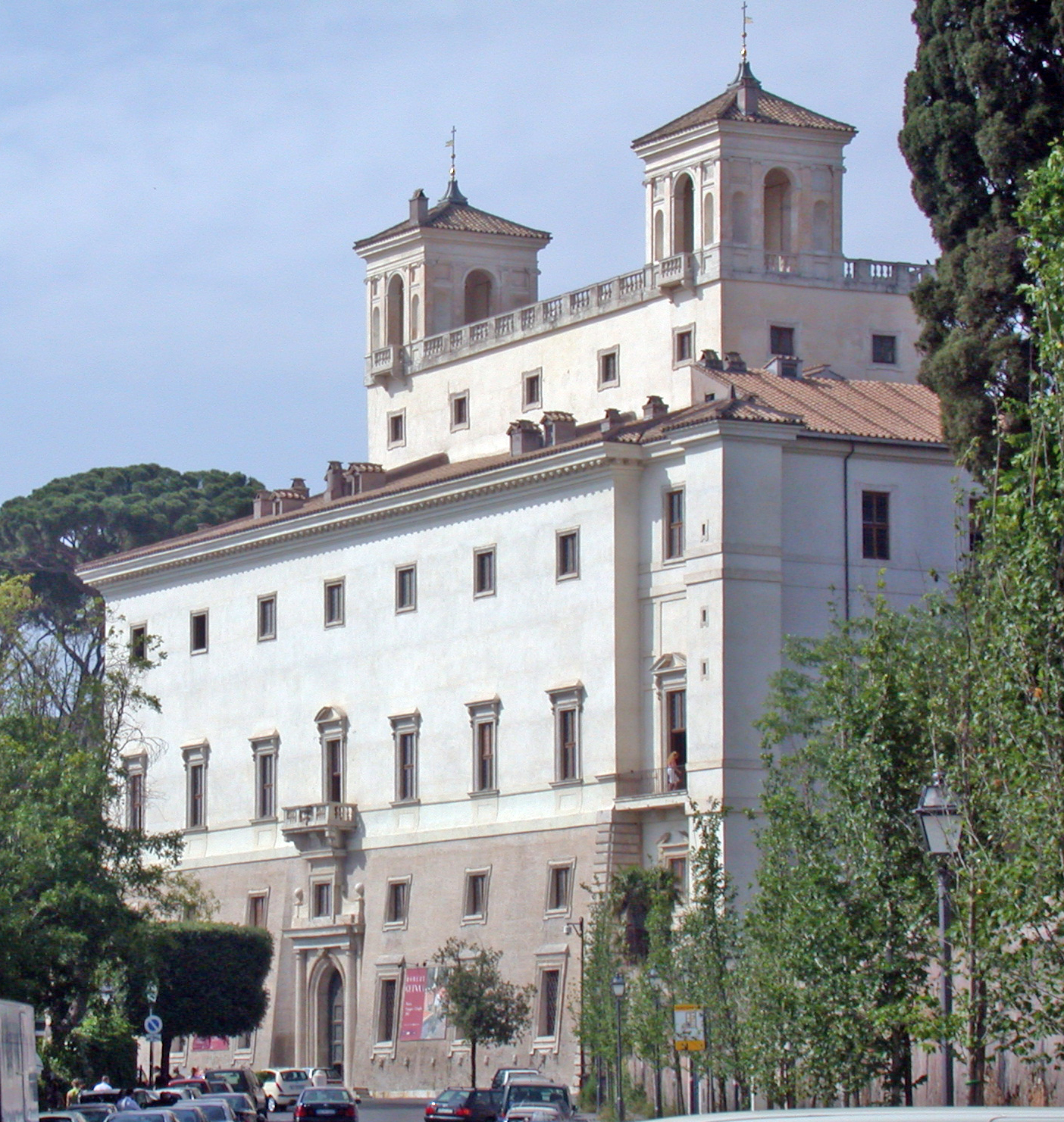
Villa Medici seen from the Piazza Trinità dei Monti above the Spanish Steps.

Among the striking assemblage of Roman sculptures in the villa were some one hundred seventy pieces bought from two Roman collections that had come together through marriage, the Capranica and the della Valle collections. An engraving detailing the arrangement of statues before 1562 was documented by Galassi Alghisi. Three works that arrived at the Villa Medici under Cardinal Fernando, ranked with the most famous in the city: the Niobe Group and the Wrestlers, both discovered in 1583 and immediately purchased by Cardinal Ferdinando, and the Arrotino. When the Cardinal succeeded as Grand Duke of Tuscany in 1587, his elder brother having died, he satisfied himself with plaster copies of his Niobe Group, in full knowledge of the prestige that accrued to the Medici by keeping such a magnificent collection in the European city whose significance far surpassed that of their capital. The Medici lions were completed in 1598, and the Medici Vase entered the collection at the Villa, followed by the Venus de' Medici by the 1630s; the Medici sculptures were not removed to Florence until the eighteenth century. Then, the antiquities from the Villa Medici formed the nucleus of the collection of antiquities in the Uffizi, and Florence began to figure on the European Grand Tour.

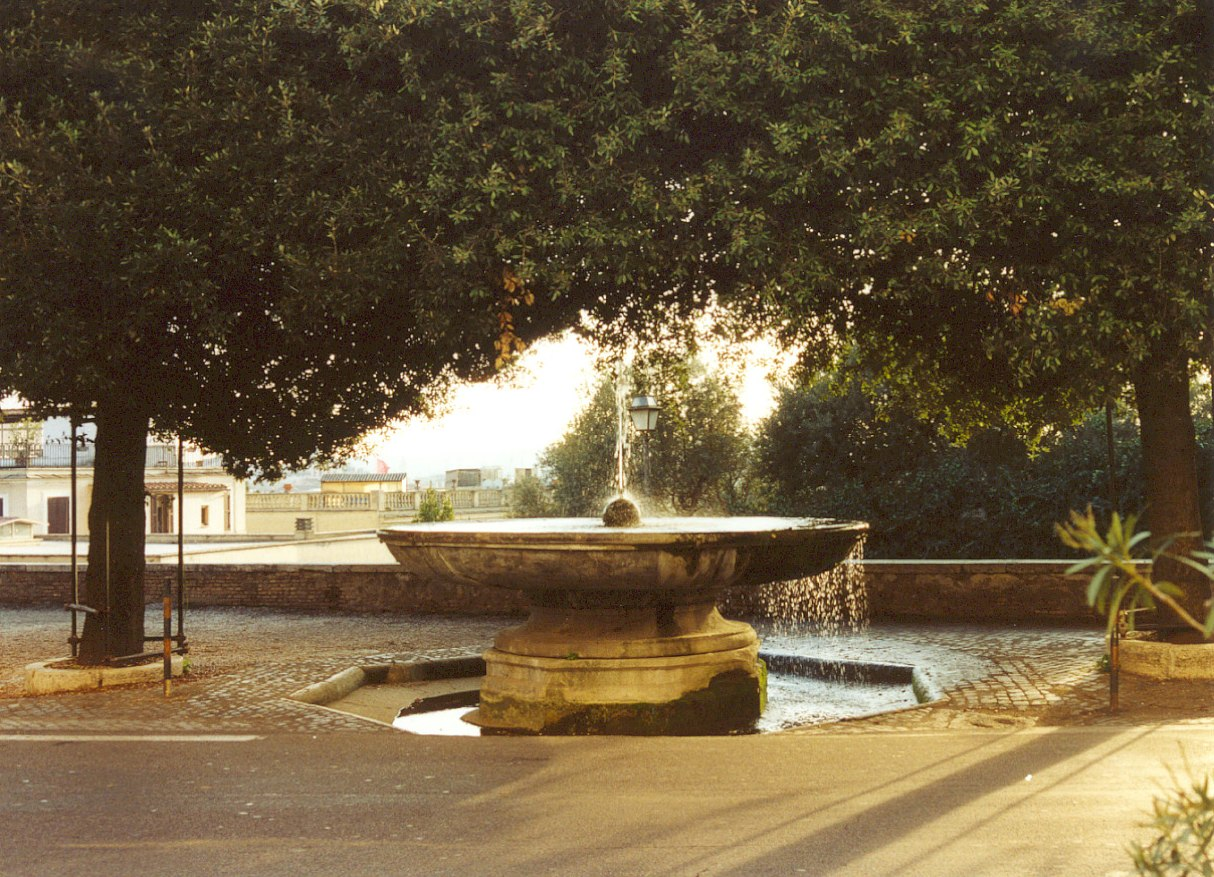
The fountain in 2002.

The fountain in front of the Villa Medici is formed from a red granite vase from ancient Rome. It was designed by Annibale Lippi in 1589. The view from the Villa looking over the fountain towards St Peter's in the distance has been much painted, but the trees in the foreground have now obscured the view.

Like the Villa Borghese that adjoins them, the villa's gardens were far more accessible than the formal palaces such as Palazzo Farnese in the heart of the city. For a century and a half the Villa Medici was one of the most elegant and worldly settings in Rome, the seat of the Grand Dukes' embassy to the Holy See. When the male line of the Medici died out in 1737, the villa passed to the house of Lorraine and, briefly in Napoleonic times, to the Kingdom of Etruria. In this manner, Napoleon Bonaparte came into possession of the Villa Medici, which he transferred to the French Academy at Rome. Subsequently, it housed the winners of the prestigious Prix de Rome, under distinguished directors including Ingres and Balthus, until the prize was withdrawn in 1968.

In 1656, Christina, Queen of Sweden was said to have fired one of the cannons on top of the Castel Sant'Angelo without aiming it first. The wayward ball hit the villa, destroying one of the Florentine lilies that decorated the facade.

== French Academy in Rome ==
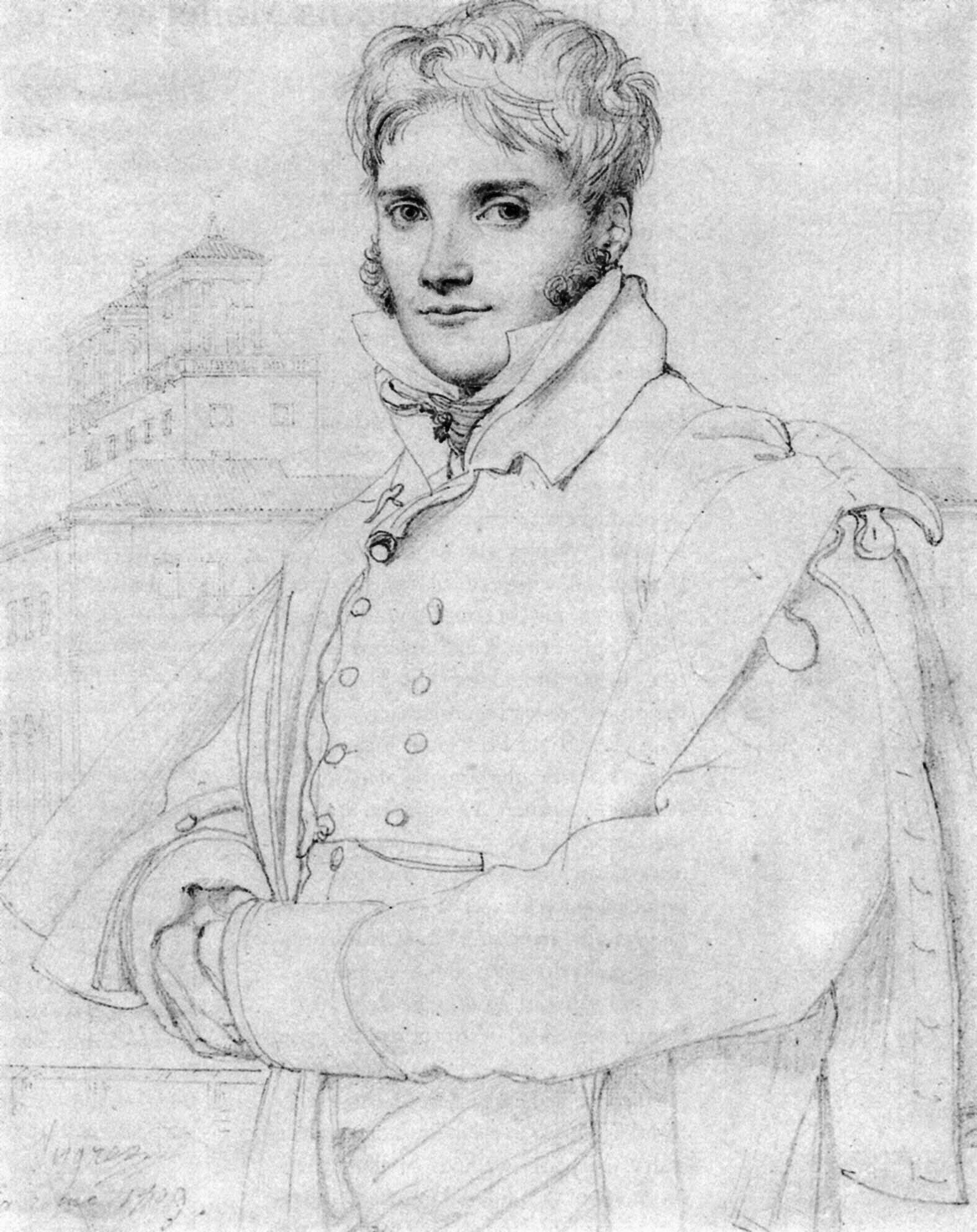
Portrait by Ingres of fellow student Merry-Joseph Blondel in front of the Villa in 1809.

In 1803, Napoleon Bonaparte moved the French Academy in Rome to the Villa Medici to preserve an institution once threatened by the French Revolution. At first, the villa and its gardens were sad, and they had to be renovated to house the winners of the Prix de Rome. In this way, he hoped to retain for young French artists the opportunity to see and copy the masterpieces of antiquity and the Renaissance. The young architect Auguste-Henri-Victor Grandjean de Montigny undertook the renovation.

The competition was interrupted during the First World War, and Benito Mussolini confiscated the villa in 1941, forcing the Academy of France in Rome to withdraw until 1945. Between 1961 and 1967, the artist Balthus, then at the head of the Academy, carried out a vast restoration campaign of the palace and its gardens, providing them with modern equipment. Balthus participated “hands-on” in all the phases of the construction. Where the historic décor had disappeared, Balthus proposed personal alternatives. He invented a décor that was a homage to the past and, at the same time, radically contemporary.

The competition and the Prix de Rome were abolished in 1968 by André Malraux, the French Minister of Culture. The Académie des Beaux-Arts in Paris and the Institut de France then lost their guardianship of the Villa Medici to the Ministry of Culture and the French State. From that time on, pensionnaires (residencies) were no longer restricted to artists practicing the traditional disciplines (painting, sculpture, architecture, metal engraving, precious-stone engraving, musical composition, etc.) but included to new or previously neglected artistic fields (art history, archaeology, literature, stagecraft, photography, movies, video, art restoration, writing and even cooking.) Artists are no longer recruited by a competition but by application, and their stays generally vary from six to eighteen months.

The mysterious melancholic decor Balthus created for Villa Medici has become, in turn, historic and was undergoing a critical restoration campaign in 2016. Work continued under the direction of the previous director, Richard Peduzzi, and the Villa Medici resumed organizing exhibitions and shows created by its artists in residence.

The Academy continues its programme of inviting young artists, who receive a stipend to spend twelve months in Rome, exhibiting their work. These artists-in-residence are known as pensionnaires. The French word ‘pension’ refers to the room & board these, generally young and promising, artists receive. The Villa Medici hosts several guest rooms, and when pensionnaires or other official guests do not use these, they are open to the general public.

== Architectural influence ==
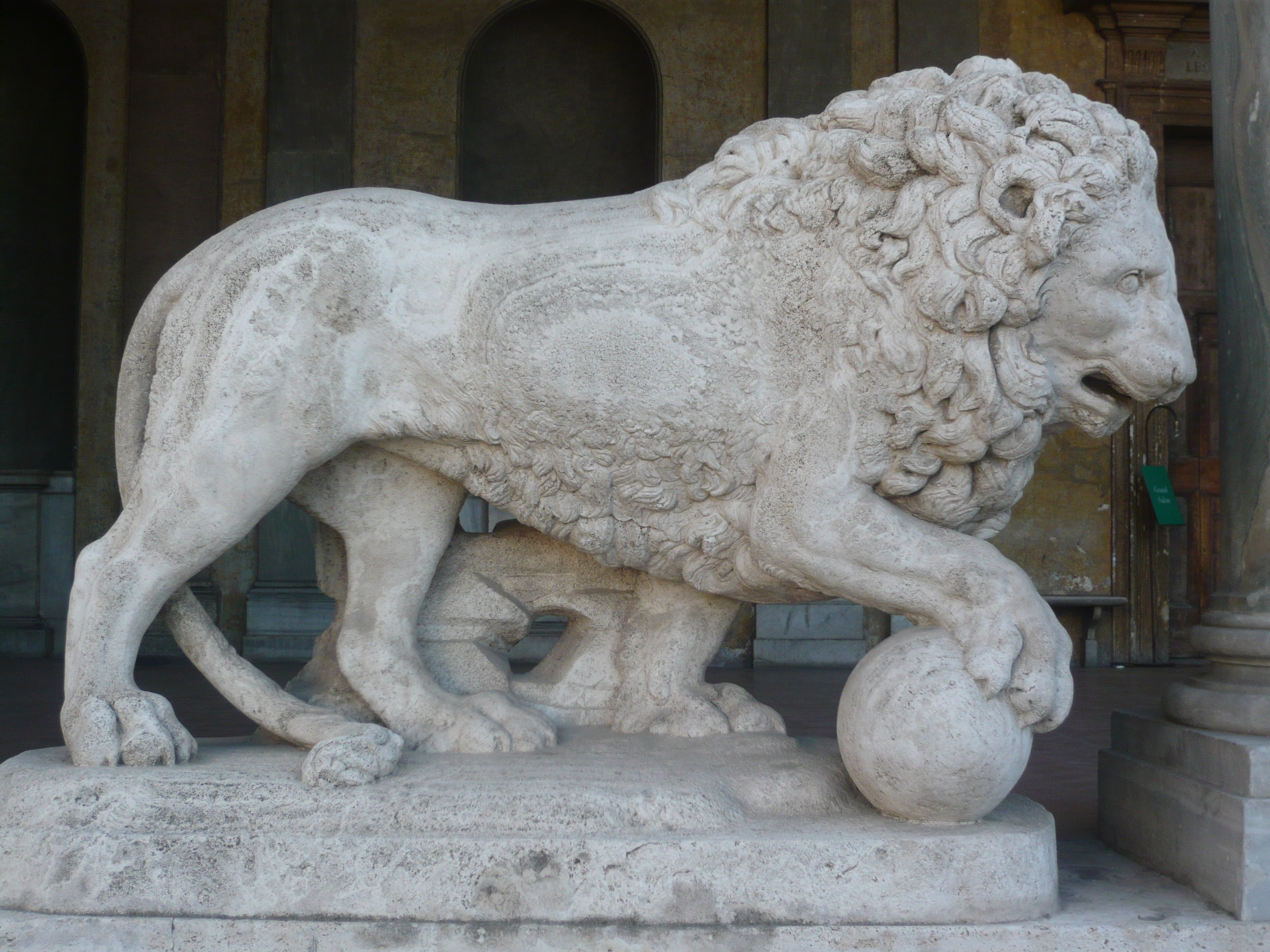
Marble copy by Augustin Pajou of one of the Medici Lions at the villa's Loggia dei leoni.

Several structures base their style on the villa. Architect Edward Lippincott Tilton designed the Hotel Colorado in Glenwood Springs, Colorado in 1893. Philanthropist James H. Dooley had a mansion called Swannanoa built on Rockfish Gap, Virginia in 1912. The NYC architectural firm Schultze and Weaver modeled the Breakers Hotel in Palm Beach, Florida after the Villa for the hotel's second reconstruction, which took place between 1925 and 1926.

The marble Medici lions by the stairs to the courtyard inspired Bernard Foucquet's bronze lions at the Lejonbacken (lion slope) on the northern side of the Royal Palace in Stockholm from 1700 to 1704.

== See also ==
- Villa Medicea di Cafaggiolo
- Villa Medici at Careggi
- Villa Medici in Fiesole
- Villa Medicea di Pratolino

== Notes ==
Preceded by Villa Doria Pamphili	Landmarks of Rome; Villa Medici	Succeeded by Villa Torlonia, Rome
