= Ponte Giuseppe Mazzini =

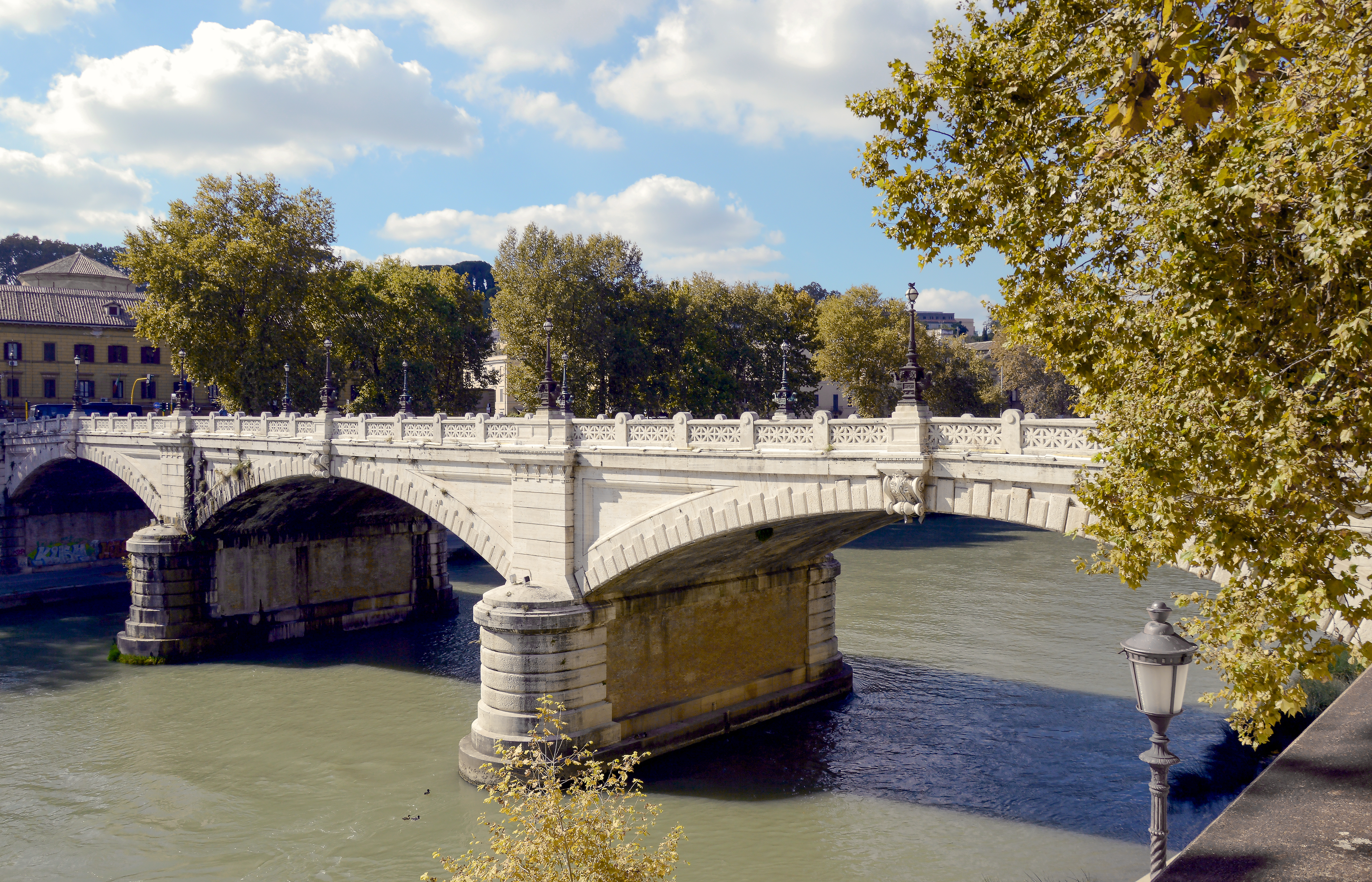
- Coordinates: 41°53′46.18″N 12°27′57.35″E
- Crosses: Tiber
- Locale: Rome

Characteristics
- Material: Masonry
- Total length: 106 metres (348 ft)

History
- Engineering design by: Viani, Moretti
- Construction start: 1904
- Inaugurated: 1908

Location
- Click on the map for a fullscreen view

Ponte Giuseppe Mazzini, also known as Ponte Mazzini, is a bridge that links Lungotevere dei Sangallo to Lungotevere della Farnesina in Rome (Italy), in the Rioni Regola and Trastevere.

== Description ==
The bridge was designed by engineers Viani and Moretti and built between 1904 and 1908; it was dedicated to Giuseppe Mazzini, one of the makers of Italian unification. The bridge links Via della Lungara to via Giulia; it was formerly called Ponte Gianicolense, in remembrance of the ancient bridge with the same name.

It shows three masonry arches and is 106 metres (348 ft) long.

== Bibliography ==
- Ravaglioli, Armando (1997). Roma anno 2750 ab Urbe condita. Storia, monumenti, personaggi, prospettive. Rome: Tascabili Economici Newton. ISBN 88-8183-670-X.
- Rendina, Claudio (2005). Enciclopedia di Roma. Rome: Newton Compton Editori. ISBN 88-541-0304-7.
