= Lipy =

Lipy may refer to the following places:

- Lipy, Lubusz Voivodeship (west Poland)
- Lipy, Pomeranian Voivodeship (north Poland)
- Lipy, Świętokrzyskie Voivodeship (south-central Poland)
