= Regola =

Coordinates: 41°53′41″N 12°28′16″E

- Rione of Rome
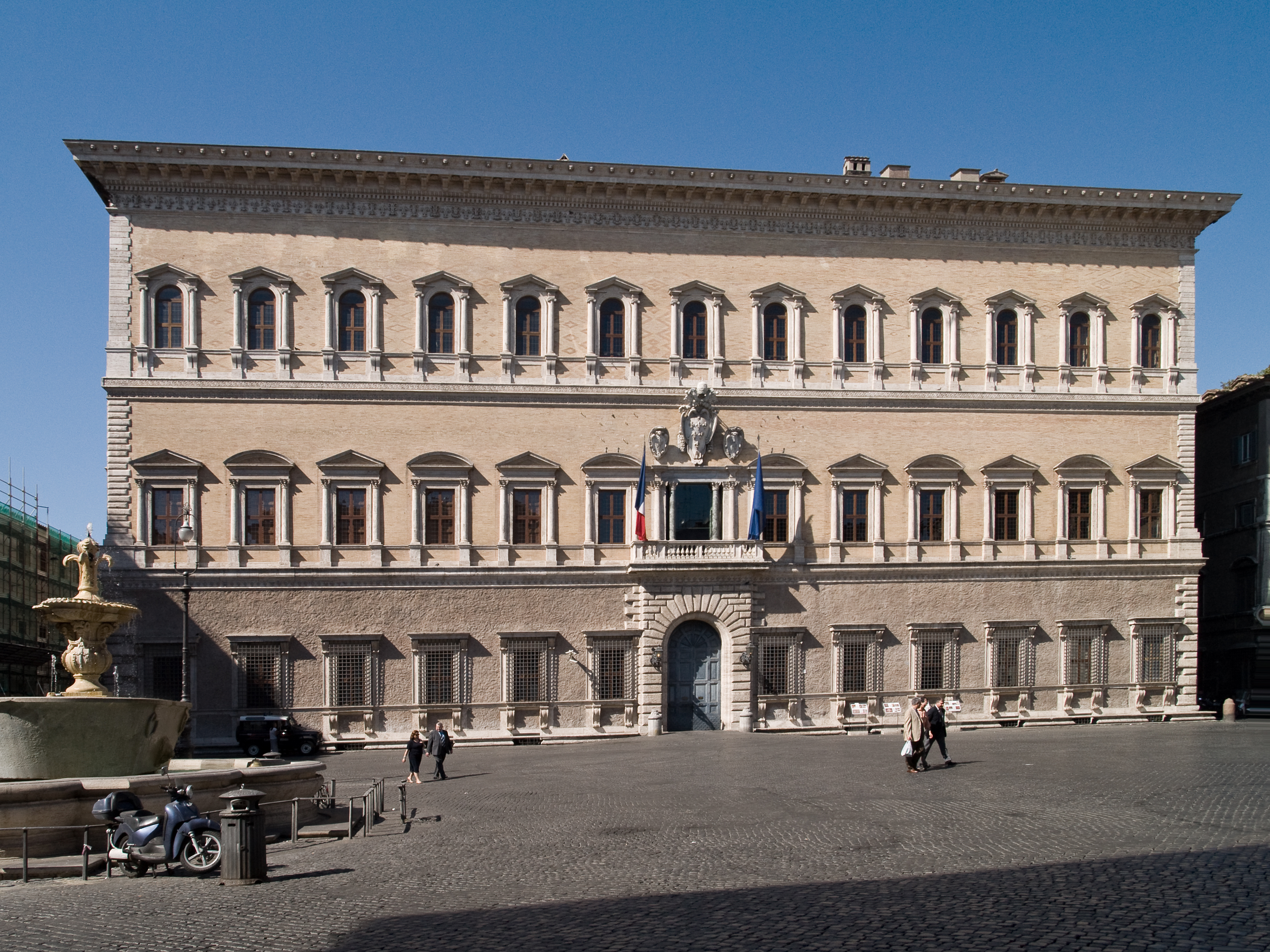
- Palazzo Farnese

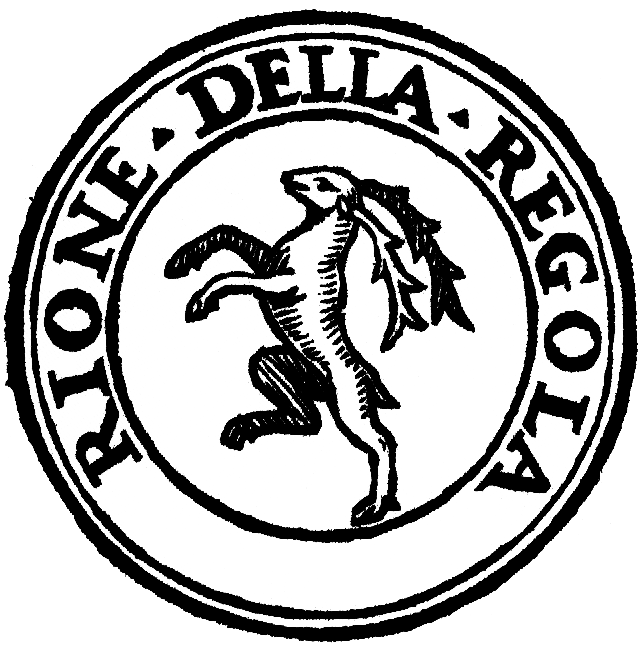
- Seal

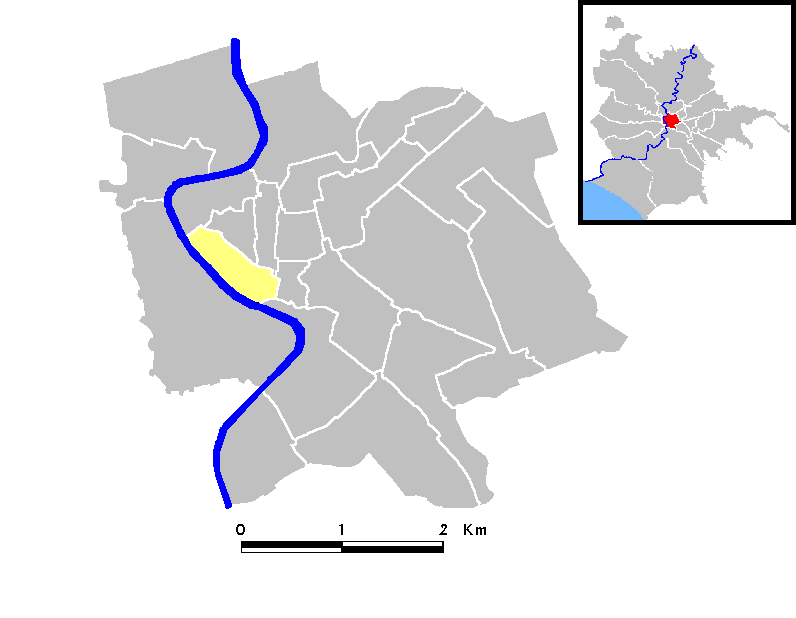
- Position of the rione within the center of the city
- Country: Italy
- Region: Lazio
- Province: Rome
- Comune: Rome
- Demonym: Regolanti
- Time zone: UTC+1 (CET)
  - Summer (DST): UTC+2 (CEST)

Regola is the 7th rione of Rome, Italy, identified by the initials R. VII, and belongs to the Municipio I. The name comes from Arenula (the name is recognizable in the modern Via Arenula), which was the name of the soft sand (rena in Italian) that the river Tiber left after the floods, and that built strands on the left bank.

The inhabitants of the rione are called Regolanti. They were nicknamed mangiacode ('tail-eaters'), after the typical dish coda alla vaccinara, which was a specialty of the many vaccinari ('butchers') of the rione.

The seal of the rione represents a rampant deer with a turquoise background.

== History ==
During the Roman Empire, the area belonged to the Campus Martius. In particular, in the modern Regola there was the trigarium, the stadium where the riders of the triga (a cart with three horses) used to train.

When Emperor Augustus divided Rome into 14 regions, the modern Regola belonged was included in the IX region called Circus Flaminius. In the Middle Ages it entered the fourth of the seven new ecclesiastic regions, even if at that time the limits of the rioni were not very clear.

Because of the very frequent floods of the river Tiber, the area was unhealthy and it was drained at the end of the Middle Ages.

In 1586, when rione Borgo was established, the number of the rioni increased to 14, and Regola became the 7th, with the name of Arenulae et Chacabariorum.

In 1875, after the walls to stop the floods of the Tiber were built, the look of the area changed completely, removing all the things that grew up close to the river during the centuries.

Though small, the rione contains many kinds of buildings: palaces, hospitals, churches, embassies, ancient prisons and poor houses.

== Geography ==
=== Boundaries ===
To the north, Regola borders with Ponte (R. V), from which is separated by Via Bravaria, Vicolo della Scimia, Via delle Carceri and Via dei Banchi Vecchi; with Parione (R. VI), whose border is marked by Via dei Banchi Vecchi, Via del Pellegrino, Via dei Cappellari, Campo de' Fiori, Via dei Giubbonari; and with Sant'Eustachio (R. VIII), the boundary being outlined by Via dei Giubbonari, Piazza Benedetto Cairoli, Via Arenula and Via di Santa Maria del Pianto.

To the east, it borders with Sant'Angelo (R. XI), from which is separated by Via di Santa Maria del Pianto and Piazza delle Cinque Scole, up to the Tiber. The Tiber itself briefly outlines the boundary with Ripa (R. XII), alongside the Tiber Island.

Southward and westward, Regola borders with Trastevere (R. XIII), from which is separated by the stretch of the Tiber between Ponte Giuseppe Mazzini and Ponte Garibaldi.

== Places of interest ==
=== Palaces and other buildings ===
- Palazzo Cisterna, in Via Giulia.
- Palazzo Falconieri, in Via Giulia.
- Palazzo Farnese, in Piazza Farnese, seat of the French embassy.
- Palazzo Fusconi-Pighini, in Piazza Farnese.
- Palazzo Piacentini, in Via Arenula, seat of the Ministry of Justice.
- Palazzo del Monte di Pietà, in Piazza del Monte di Pietà.
- Palazzo Spada and Galleria Spada, in Piazza Capo di Ferro.
- Palazzo Cenci, in Via Beatrice Cenci.
- Palazzetto Cenci, in Piazza Cenci.

=== Churches ===
- Sant'Eligio degli Orefici
- Santa Maria in Monticelli
- Santissima Trinità dei Pellegrini
- San Salvatore in Onda
- Santo Spirito dei Napoletani
- Santa Caterina da Siena a Via Giulia
- Santa Maria dell'Orazione e Morte
- Santi Giovanni Evangelista e Petronio
- San Paolo alla Regola
- San Tommaso ai Cenci
- Santa Maria del Pianto
- San Salvatore in Campo
- Santa Maria della Quercia
- Santa Brigida
- San Girolamo della Carità
- Santa Caterina della Rota
- San Tommaso di Canterbury
- Santa Maria in Monserrato degli Spagnoli
- Santa Lucia del Gonfalone

=== Education ===
Public libraries in Regola include the Biblioteca Centrale dei Ragazzi.
