= Nanni di Baccio Bigio =

Italian architect

Giovanni Lippi (1507? – 1568), known by the pseudonym Nanni di Baccio Bigio, was an Italian architect who lived during the 16th century.

== Works ==
A versatile architect, he had originally set out to be a sculptor working under Raffaello da Montelupo. After arriving in Rome, he made a good copy of Michelangelo's Pietà. Michelangelo disliked him while Nanni worked to supplant Michelangelo. Nanni also took over the reconstruction of the Bridge of Santa Maria from Michelangelo in 1551, but his work proved to be inadequate and the bridge was destroyed in the 1557 flood.

He worked primarily in Rome where he designed the Palazzo Salviati alla Lungara in the style of Giuliano da Sangallo, he directed the reconstruction of the Castel Sant'Angelo, and built the Porta del Popolo.

In addition, he completed the Palazzo Sacchetti in via Giulia and contributed to the fortifications of Fano and Civitavecchia. In Monte San Savino, he contributed to the construction of the Palazzo di Monte and the Loggie dei Mercanti following the designs of Andrea Sansovino and built the Porta Fiorentina following the designs of Giorgio Vasari, and decorated with frescos representing the so-called Madonna delle Vertighe tra Santi (Madonna of the Peaks among Saints). He also built the Palazzo Lante for the Medici.

== Personal life ==
Nanni was born in Florence circa 1507.

In 1568, he died in Rome. He was the father of Annibale Lippi, also an architect, who died after 1581.
