= Annibale Lippi =

Italian architect

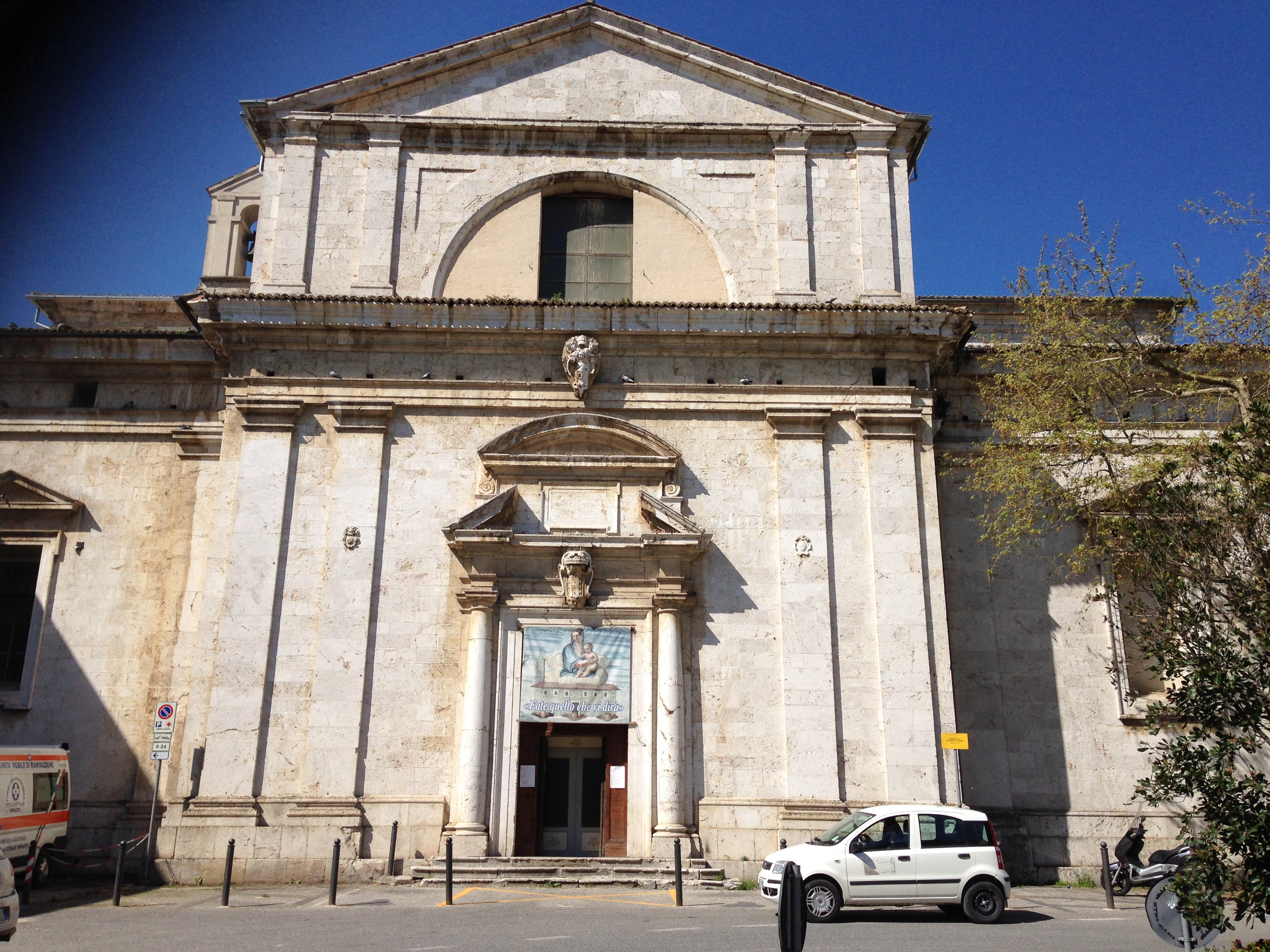
Church of Madonna di Loreto in Spoleto

Annibale Lippi (16th century-Rome, after 18 November 1581) was an Italian architect active during the second half of 16th century. He was son of the sculptor and architect Nanni di Baccio Bigio. Pupil of Francesco Salviati, his only certain works are the church of Our Lady of Loreto at Spoleto, built around 1572, where he adopts a Vignola style, the churches of Santa Maria a Monte Cavallo and Santa Maria della Pietà a Piazza Colonna, both in Rome. The Villa Medici in Rome, who used to be assigned to it, is probably due to his father, but he worked there during the construction. In Rome Lippi restored the Palazzo dei Convertendi at Piazza Scossacavalli in Borgo, when this was bought by Cardinal Francesco Commendone (1523–84), and gave to the building its definitive facade. In 1578 he appeared among the members of the Accademia dei Virtuosi at Pantheon. He died after 18 November 1581 when, already ill, wrote his testament, and was buried in the family tomb in Trinità dei Monti in Rome.

== Sources ==
- Gigli, Laura (1992). Guide rionali di Roma (in Italian). Vol. Borgo (III). Roma: Fratelli Palombi Editori. ISSN 0393-2710.
