= Ponte Principe Amedeo Savoia Aosta =

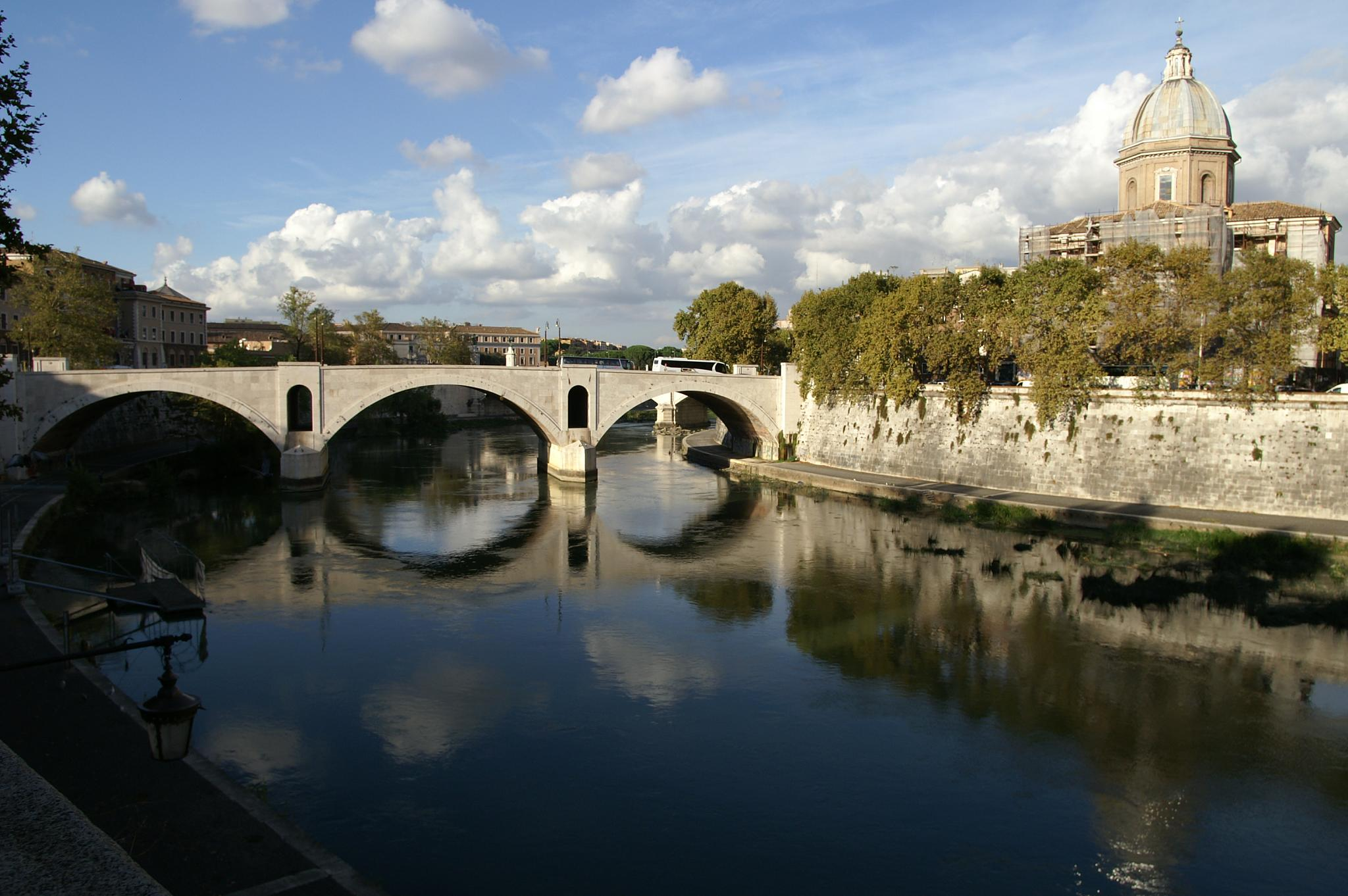
- Ponte Principe Amedeo Savoia Aosta, Rome
- Coordinates: 41°53′59″N 12°27′48″E
- Crosses: River Tiber
- Locale: Rome, Ponte, Trastevere and Borgo rioni, Italy

Characteristics
- Material: Brick and marble
- Total length: 1,097 m (3,599.1 ft)
- Width: 20 m (65.6 ft)

History
- Construction start: 1939
- Construction end: 1942
- Opened: 1942

Location
- Click on the map for a fullscreen view

Ponte Principe Amedeo Savoia Aosta, also known as Ponte Principe or Ponte PASA after its acronym, is a bridge that links Lungotevere dei Sangallo to Piazza Della Rovere in Rome (Italy), in the Rioni Ponte, Trastevere and Borgo.

== Description ==
The bridge has 3 brick arcades covered with white marble. Between the arcades there are two single-lancet windows with rounded arches. The arcades divide the Tiber into 3 branches by 2 pillars that vaguely look like ships.

It links the Basilica of San Giovanni dei Fiorentini and the area of Corso Vittorio Emanuele II to the tunnel that brings to Via Aurelia through Via di Gregorio VII.

== History ==
The bridge is dedicated to Prince Amedeo of Savoy-Aosta, Viceroy of Italian Ethiopia.

The bridge was begun in 1939, to replace the Ponte dei Fiorentini. It was completed in 1942, after 34 months and several interruptions.

The building of the bridge was committed to the Company Stoelker, while the design was realised by the Municipality of Rome.
