= Via della Lungara =

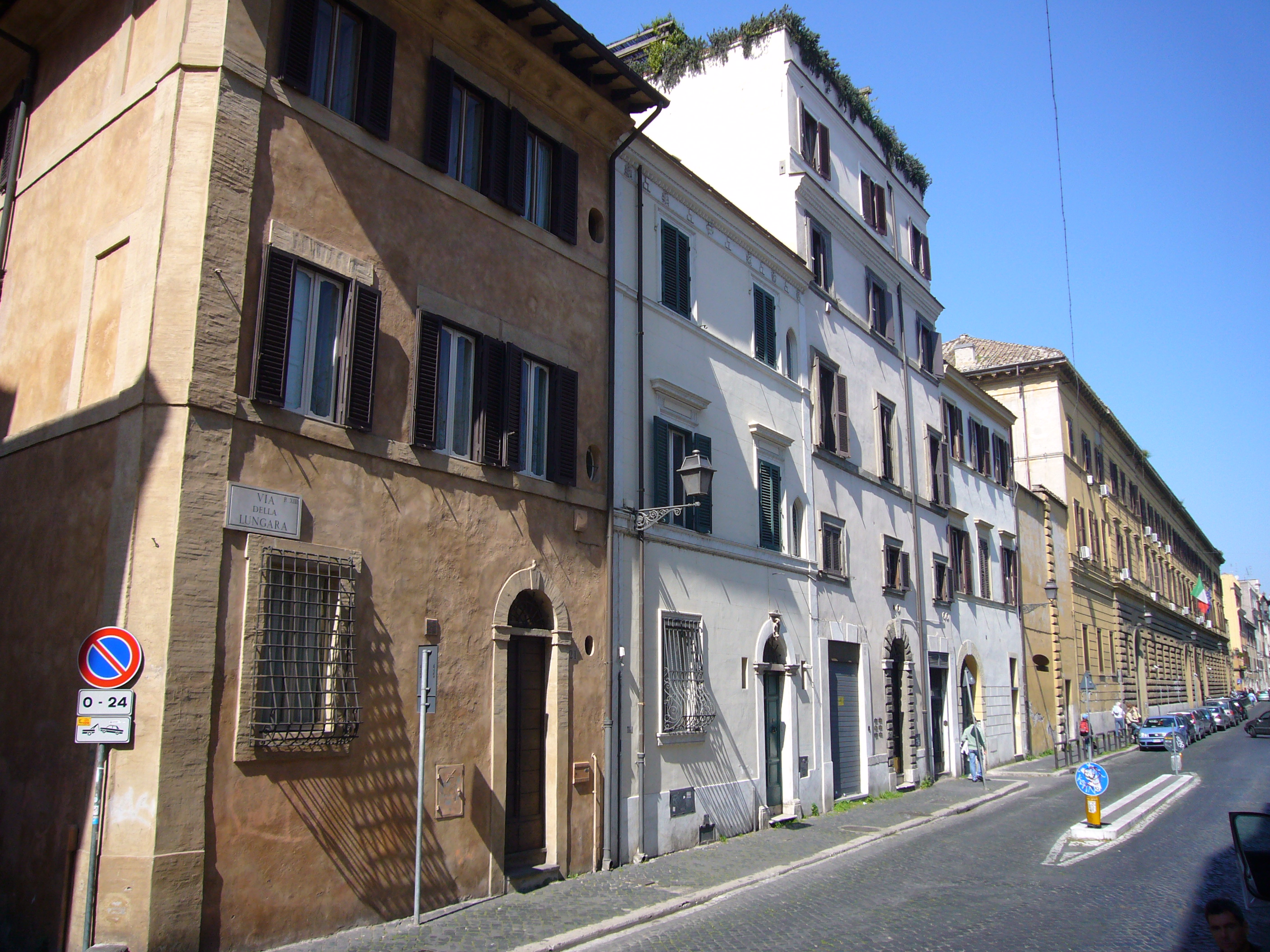
Via della Lungara al Buon Pastore at the corner with Via San Francesco di Sales

Via della Lungara is a street that links Via di Porta Settimiana to Piazza della Rovere in Rome (Italy), in the Rione Trastevere.

== History and name ==
In the 16th century, Pope Julius II opened the new via recta ("straight road") that cut through the open land south of the Vatican into Trastevere to join the Ponte Sisto, and continued all the way to the Ripa Grande at the southern edge of Rome. The original name of the street was Sub Janiculensis or Sub Jano, while the pilgrims coming to Rome to visit St. Peter's Basilica called it Via Sancta. It was later known as Via Julia, just like the street of the same name on the opposite bank of the Tiber, although Pope Julius II didn't create the street (this credit goes to Pope Alexander VI), but just adapted it.

Finally, the name was changed to Via della Lungara, that refers to its great length.

== Monuments ==
Since 1728, in Via della Lungara rose the mental hospital of Santa Maria della Pietà, an extension of the Ospedale di Santo Spirito. The hospital was enlarged in 1867 and then demolished during the building of the Lungotevere.

=== Religious architectures ===
- San Giacomo alla Lungara
- Santi Leonardo e Romualdo
- Santa Croce alla Lungara
- San Giuseppe alla Lungara

=== Civil architectures ===
- Palazzo Corsini alla Lungara
- Villa Farnesina
- Palazzo Salviati
- Prison of Regina Coeli

== In popular culture ==
Via della Lungara is connected to an ancient Roman adage:

A via de la Lungara ce sta 'n gradino
chi nun salisce quelo nun è romano,
nun è romano e né trasteverino

(In Via della Lungara there is a step:
he, who doesn't scale it, is not a Roman man,
he is not a Roman nor a Trastevere man)

It refers to the three steps giving access to the Prison of Regina Coeli: the adage means that an authentic Roman should have lived the hard experience of jail and then descended "the step of the Coeli".

== Bibliography ==
- Rendina, Claudio; Paradisi, Donatella (2004). Le strade di Roma. Second volume E-O. Rome: Newton Compton Editori. ISBN 88-541-0209-1.
- Karmon, David (2011). The Ruin of the Eternal City: Antiquity and Preservation in Renaissance Rome. Oxford University Press. ISBN 0199766894.
