= Outline of Rome =

Capital of Italy

Flag of Rome

Coat of arms of Rome

The following outline is provided as an overview of and topical guide to Rome:

Rome – capital of Italy and a special comune (named Comune di Roma Capitale). Rome also serves as the capital of the Lazio region. With 2,876,076 residents in 1,285 km2 (496.1 sq mi), it is also the country's most populated comune. It is the fourth-most populous city in the European Union by population within city limits. It is the center of the Metropolitan City of Rome, which has a population of 4.3 million residents. Rome is located in the central-western portion of the Italian Peninsula, within Lazio (Latium), along the shores of the Tiber.

The Vatican City is an independent city-state enclaved within Rome, the only existing example of a state within a city: for this reason, Rome has been often defined as the capital of two states. Rome is a very old city, founded over 28 centuries ago, and it was the center of power of the ancient Roman civilization.

== General reference ==
- Pronunciation: /roʊm/ ROHM; Italian: Roma [ˈroːma], Latin: Rōma
- Common English name(s): Rome
- Official English name(s): City of Rome
- Adjectival(s): Roman
- Demonym(s): Roman

== Geography of Rome ==
Geography of Rome

- Rome is:
  - a city
    - capital of Italy
    - capital of Lazio
    - capital of the Metropolitan City of Rome
- Population of Rome: 2,873,494
- Area of Rome:
- Atlas of Rome
- Topography of ancient Rome

=== Location of Rome ===
Rome (Italy)
- Rome is situated within the following regions:
  - Northern Hemisphere and Eastern Hemisphere
  - Eurasia
    - Europe (outline)
      - Western Europe
      - Southern Europe
        - Italian Peninsula
          - Italy (outline)
            - Central Italy
              - Lazio
                - Rome metropolitan area
                  - Metropolitan City of Rome Capital
- Time zone(s): Central European Time (UTC+01), Central European Summer Time (UTC+02)

=== Environment of Rome ===
- Climate of Rome
  - Climate of Ancient Rome

=== Landforms of Rome ===
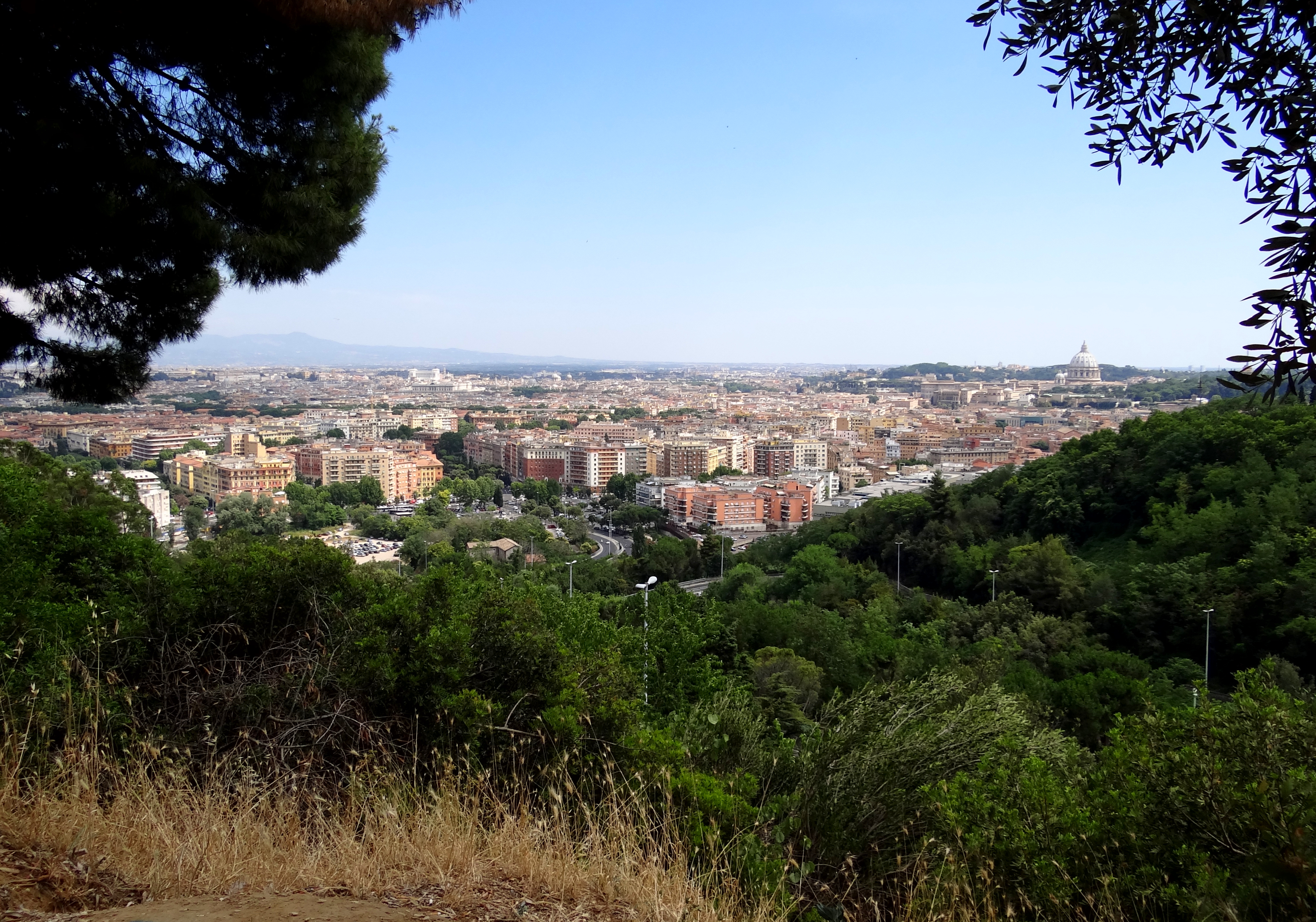
The view of the central parts of Rome and The Vatican as seen from Monte Mario

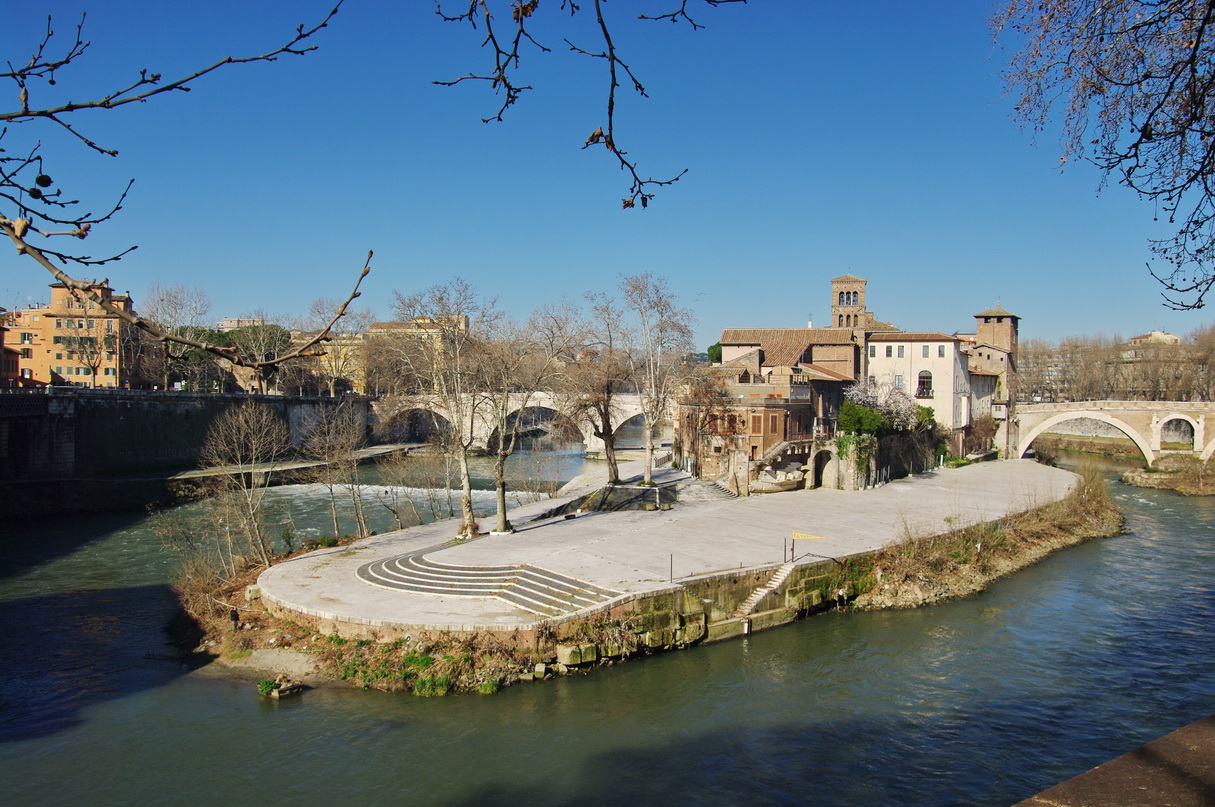
The Tiber Island

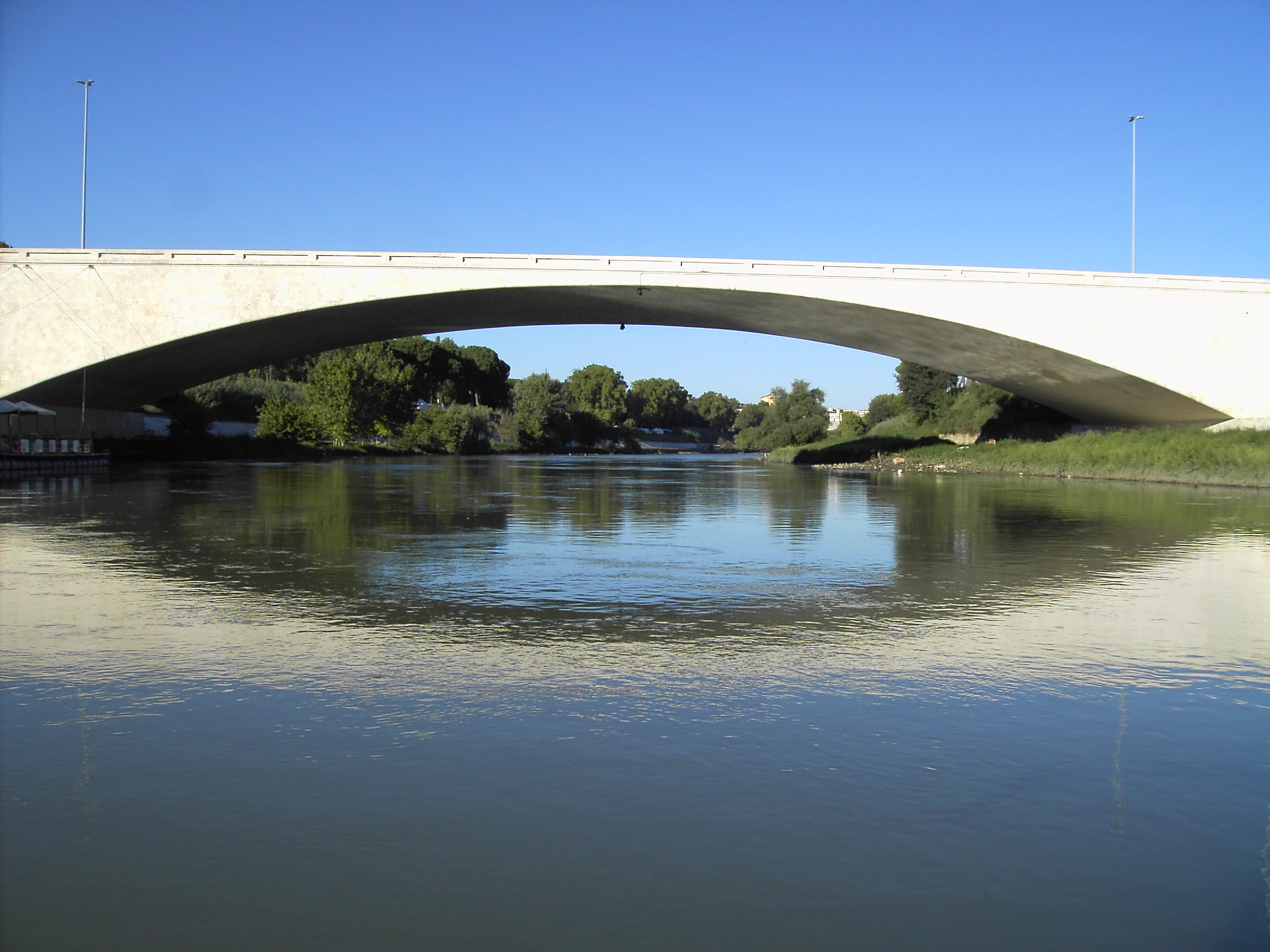
The Tiber

- Hills in Rome
  - Janiculum – second tallest hill in Rome.
  - Monte Mario – highest hill in Rome.
  - Monte Sacro
  - Monte Testaccio
  - Parioli
  - Pincian Hill
  - Seven hills of Rome
    - Aventine Hill (Latin, Aventinus; Italian, Aventino)
    - Caelian Hill (Cælius, Celio)
    - Capitoline Hill (Capitolinus, Campidoglio)
    - Esquiline Hill (Esquilinus, Esquilino)
    - Palatine Hill (Palatinus, Palatino)
    - Quirinal Hill (Quirinalis, Quirinale)
    - Viminal Hill (Viminalis, Viminale)
  - Vatican Hill
  - Velian Hill
- Islands of Rome
  - Tiber Island
- Rivers in Rome
  - Tiber River

=== Areas of Rome ===
- Ager Romanus
- Historic district of Rome
- Areas within Rome that are not actually part of Rome
  - Vatican City (outline) – only example of a country inside a city. The sovereign territory of the Holy See of the Catholic Church.
- Seven hills of Rome

==== Administrative subdivisions of Rome ====
Administrative subdivisions of Rome

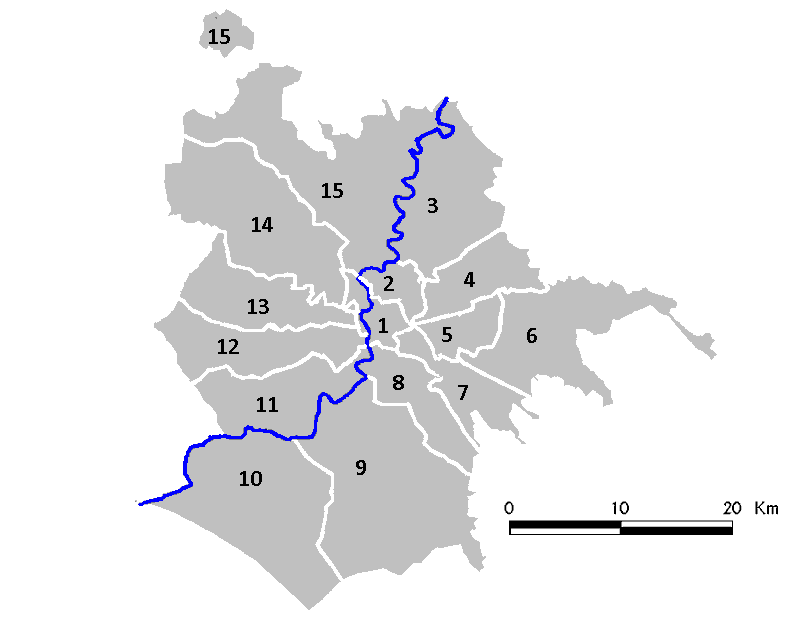
Municipi of Rome

- Municipi of Rome
  - Municipio I - Historical Center-Prati
  - Municipio II - Parioli/Nomentano-San Lorenzo
  - Municipio III - Monte Sacro
  - Municipio IV - Tiburtina
  - Municipio IX - EUR
  - Municipio V - Prenestino/Centocelle
  - Municipio VI - Roma Delle Torri
  - Municipio VII - San Giovanni/Cinecittà
  - Municipio VIII - Appia Antica
  - Municipio X - Ostia
  - Municipio XI - Arvalia Portuense
  - Municipio XII - Monte Verde
  - Municipio XIII - Aurelia
  - Municipio XIV - Monte Mario
  - Municipio XV - Cassia Flaminia

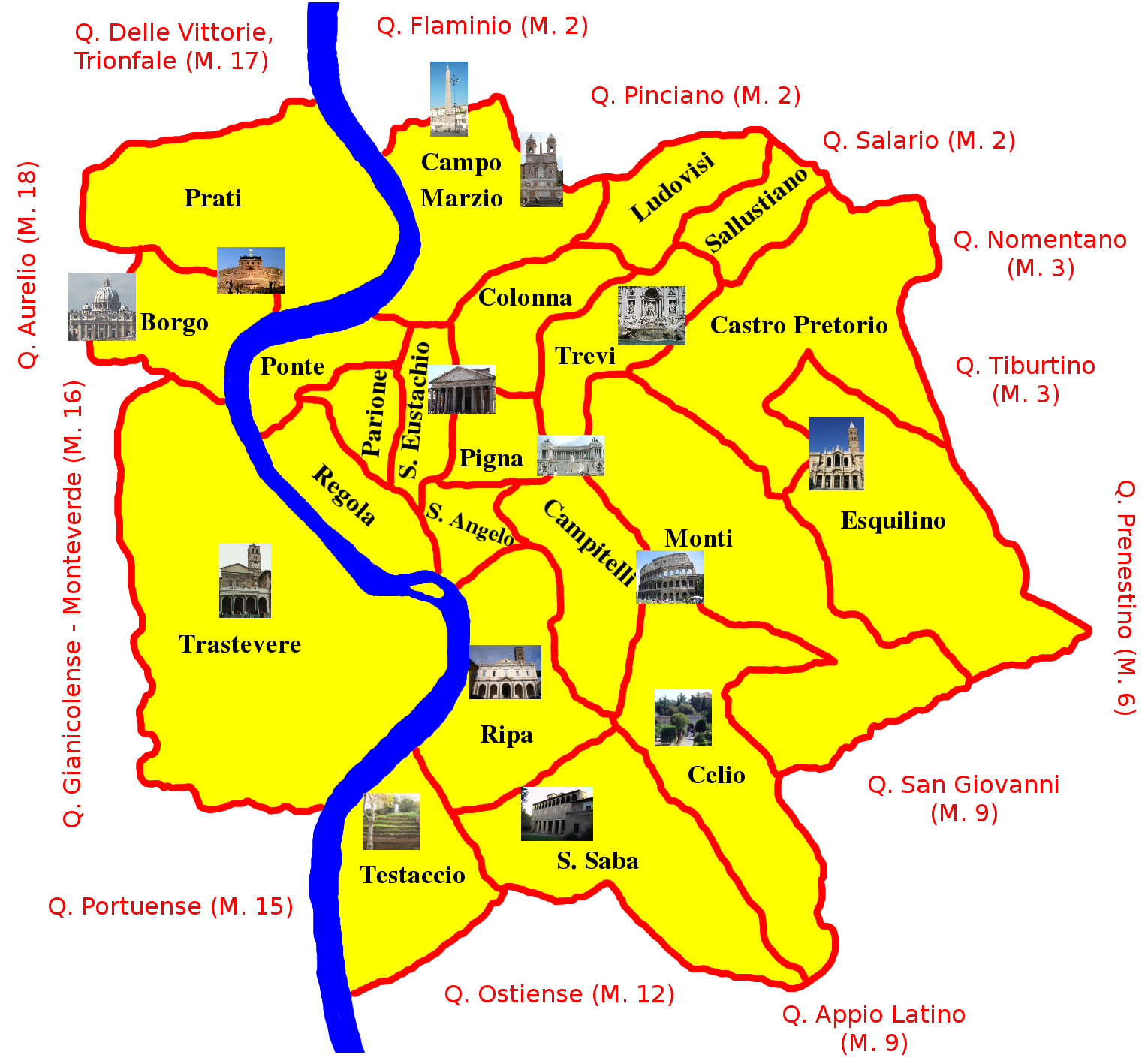
A map of the center of Rome ("centro storico", roughly equal to the walled city) with its rioni

- Rioni of Rome
  - Borgo – lies next to Vatican City
  - Campitelli – includes the Hills of Capitol and Palatine
  - Campo Marzio
  - Castro Pretorio
  - Celio – includes Hill
  - Colonna
  - Esquilino – includes Esquiline Hill
  - Ludovisi
  - Monti – includes the Hills of Quirinal and Viminal
  - Parione
  - Pigna
  - Ponte
  - Prati
  - Regola
  - Ripa – includes the Hill of Aventine
  - Sallustiano
  - San Saba
  - Sant'Angelo
  - Sant'Eustachio
  - Testaccio
  - Trastevere – includes the so-called "8th Roman Hill" of the Gianicolo
  - Trevi

=== Locations in Rome ===
- Tourist attractions
  - Museums in Rome
  - Shopping areas and markets

==== Ancient monuments in Rome ====
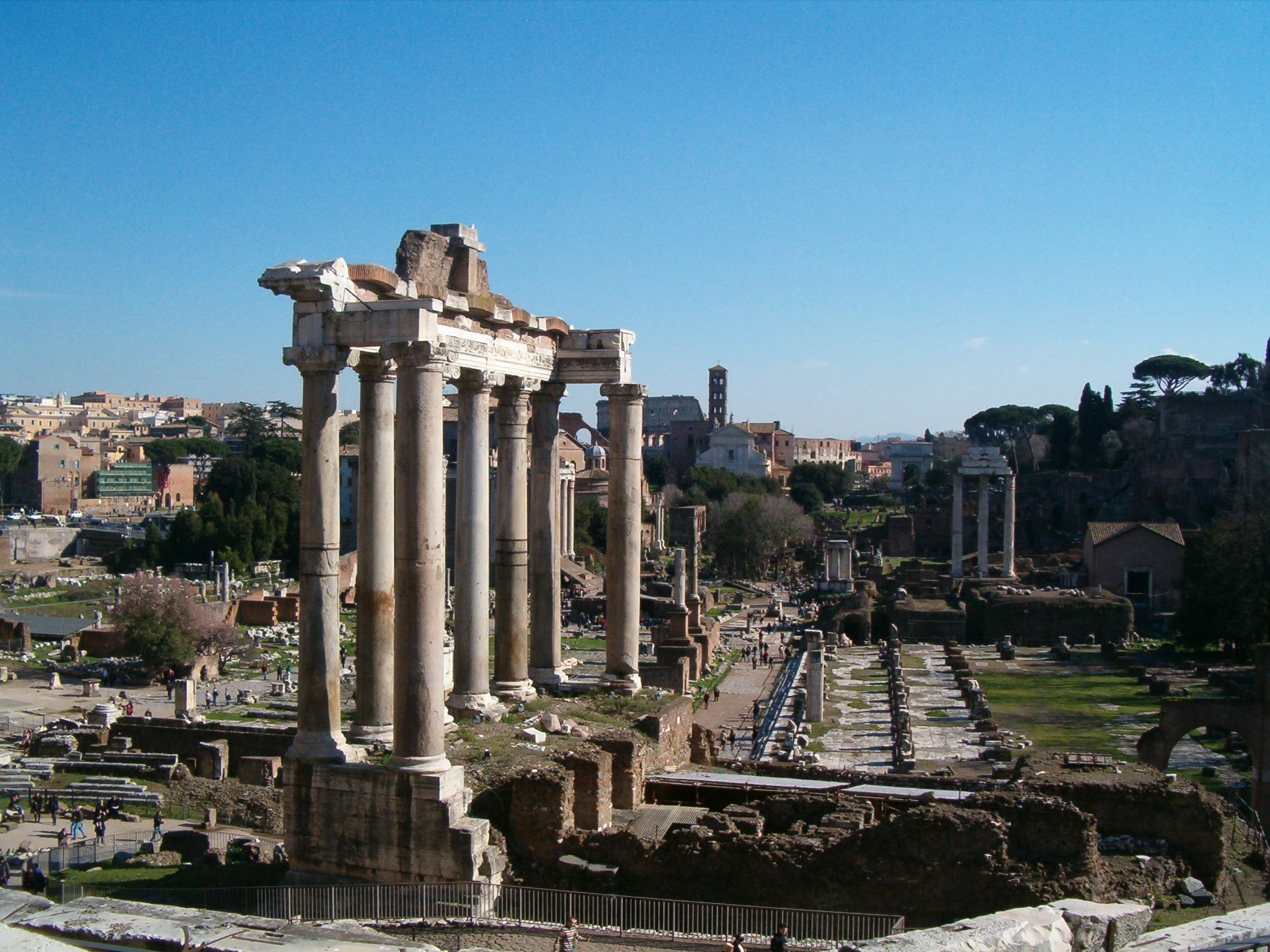
Temple of Saturn

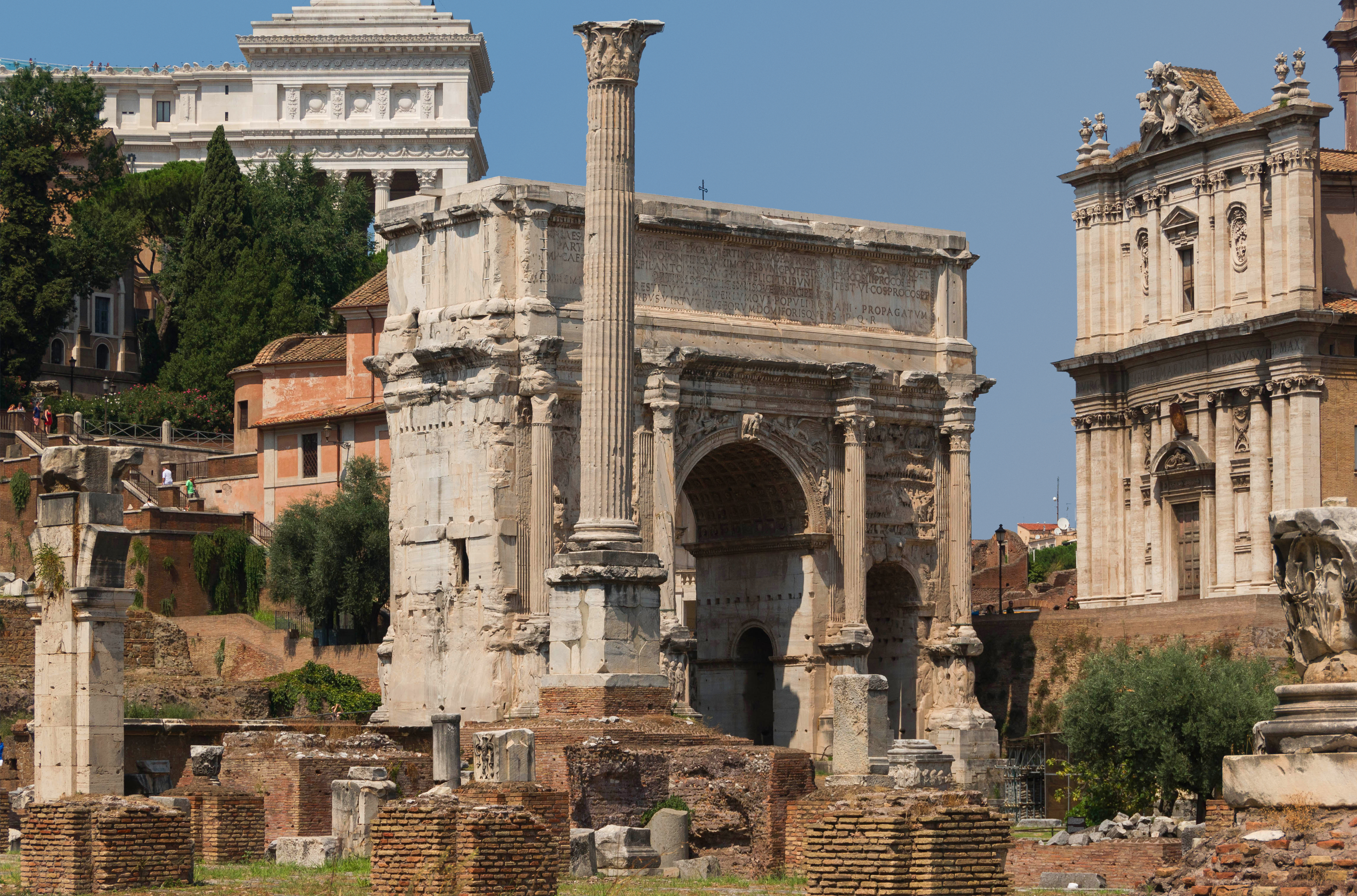
Arch of Septimius Severus

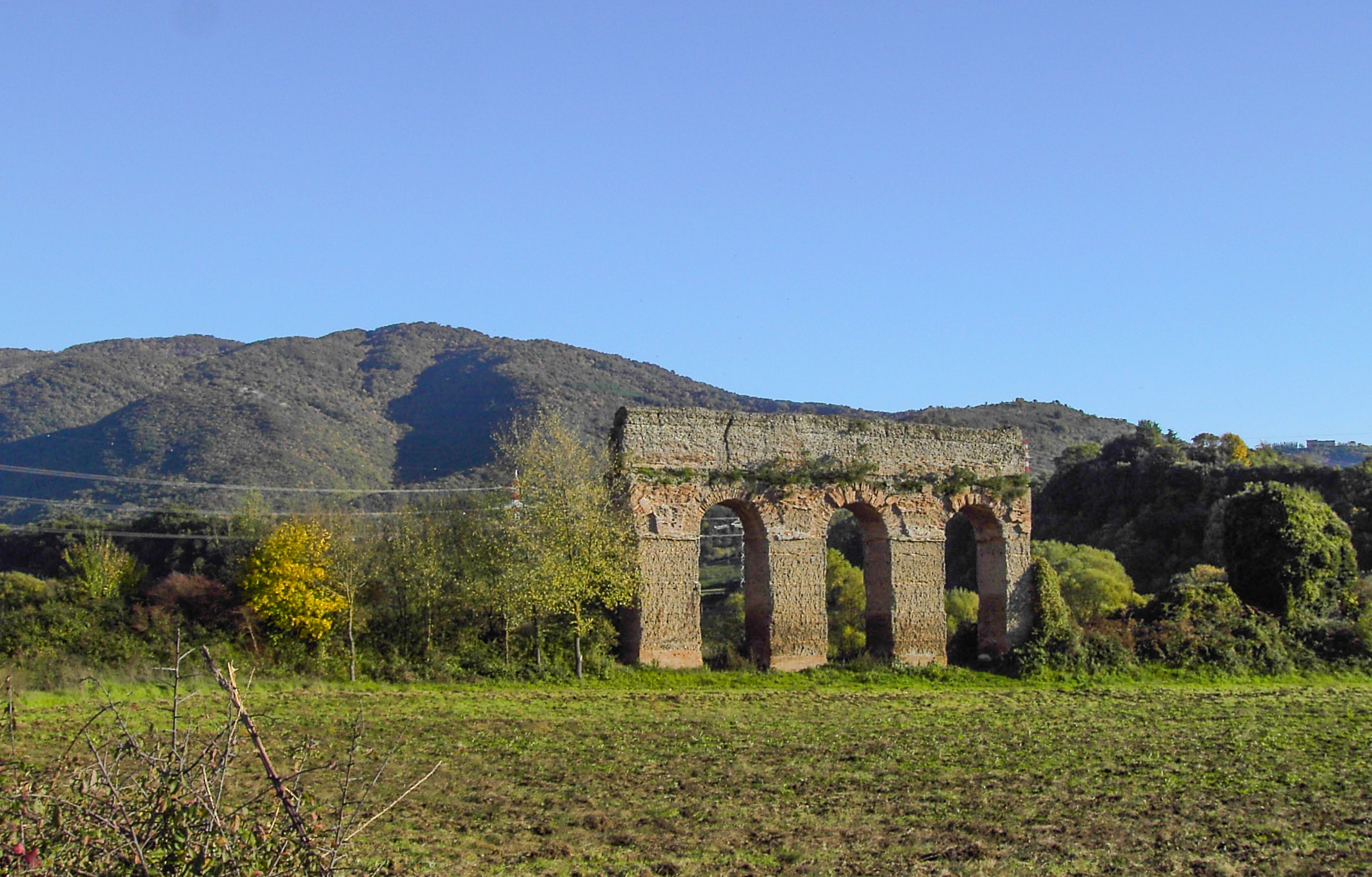
Aqua Anio Novus

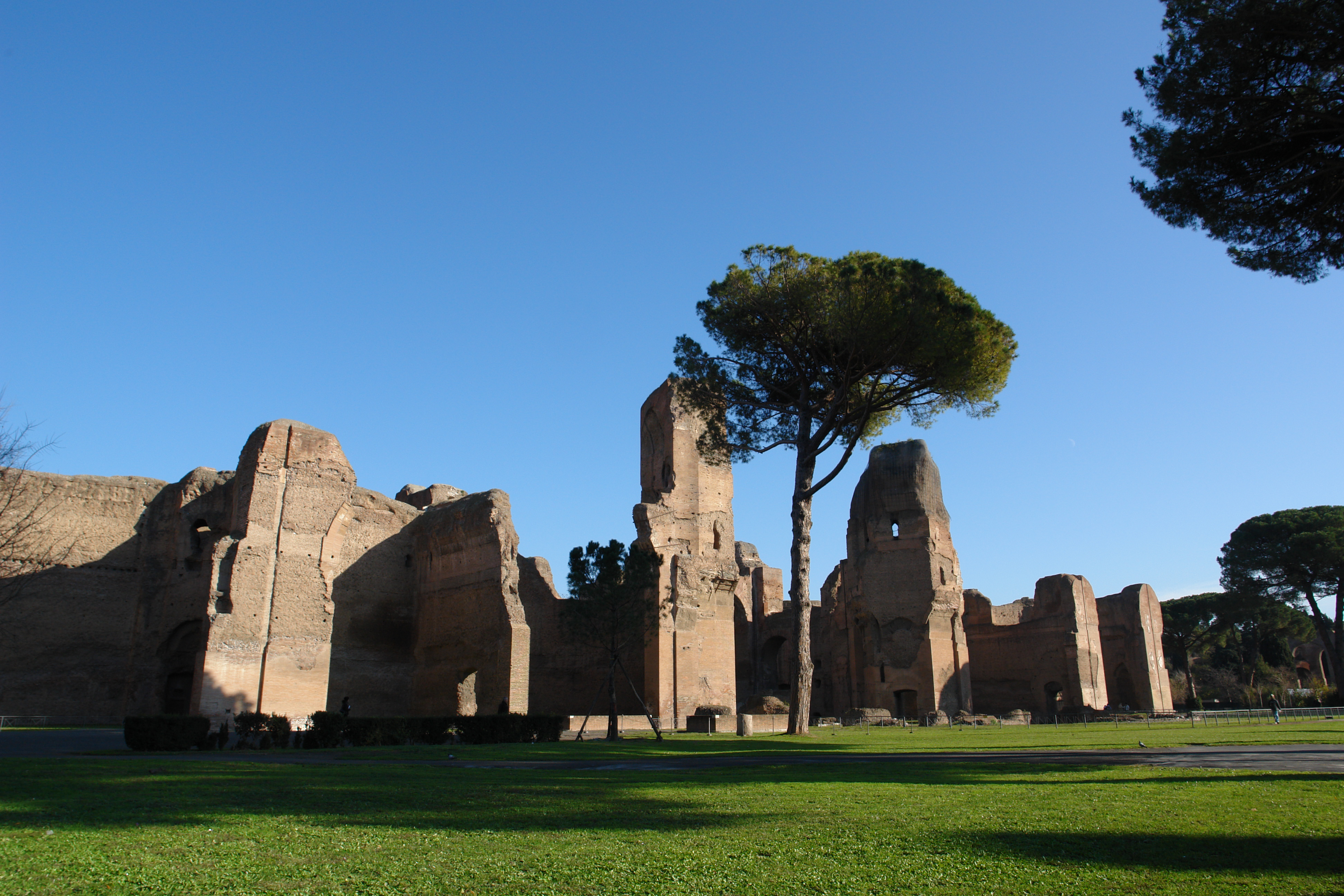
The Baths of Caracalla

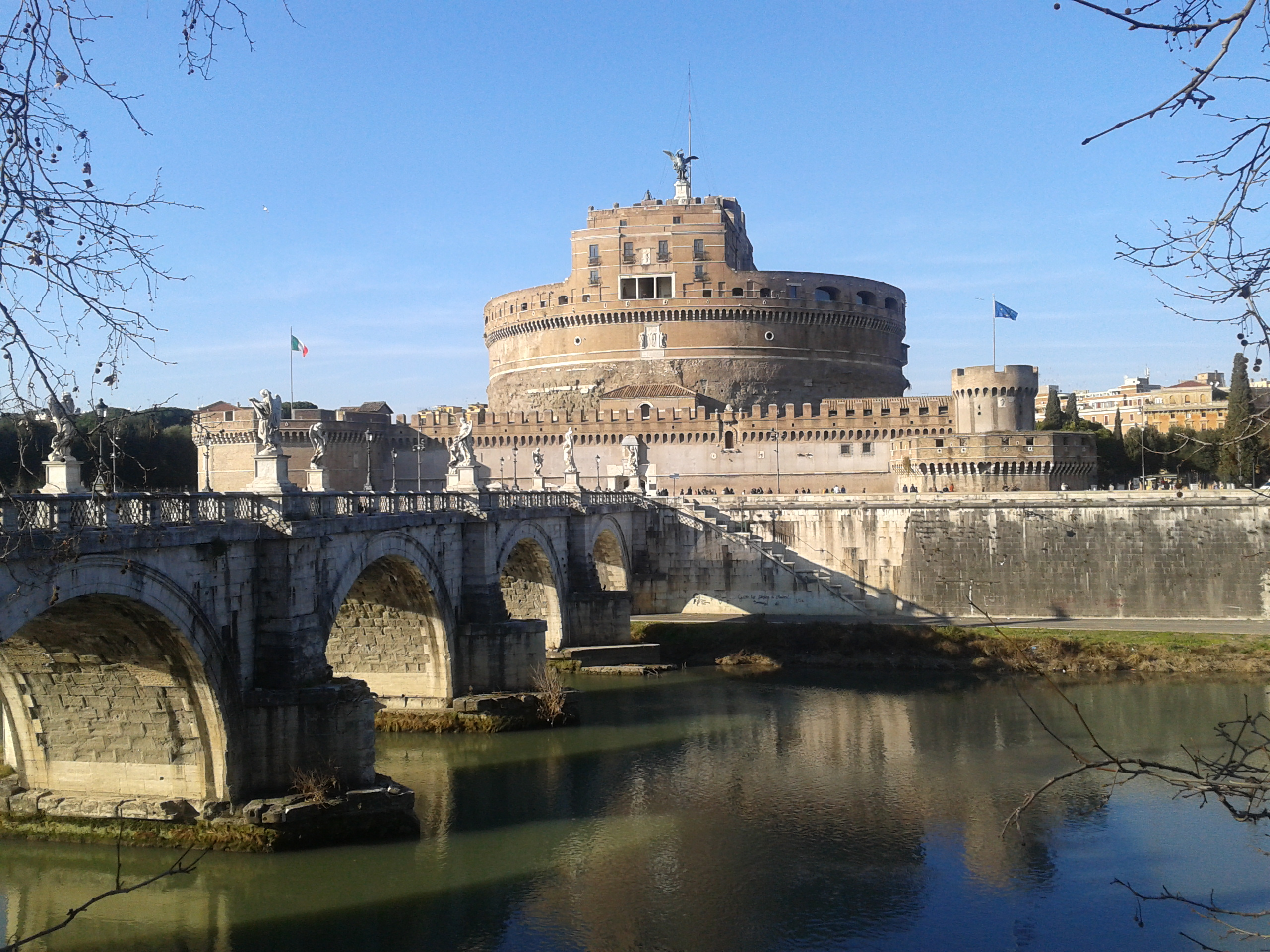
The Castel Sant'Angelo

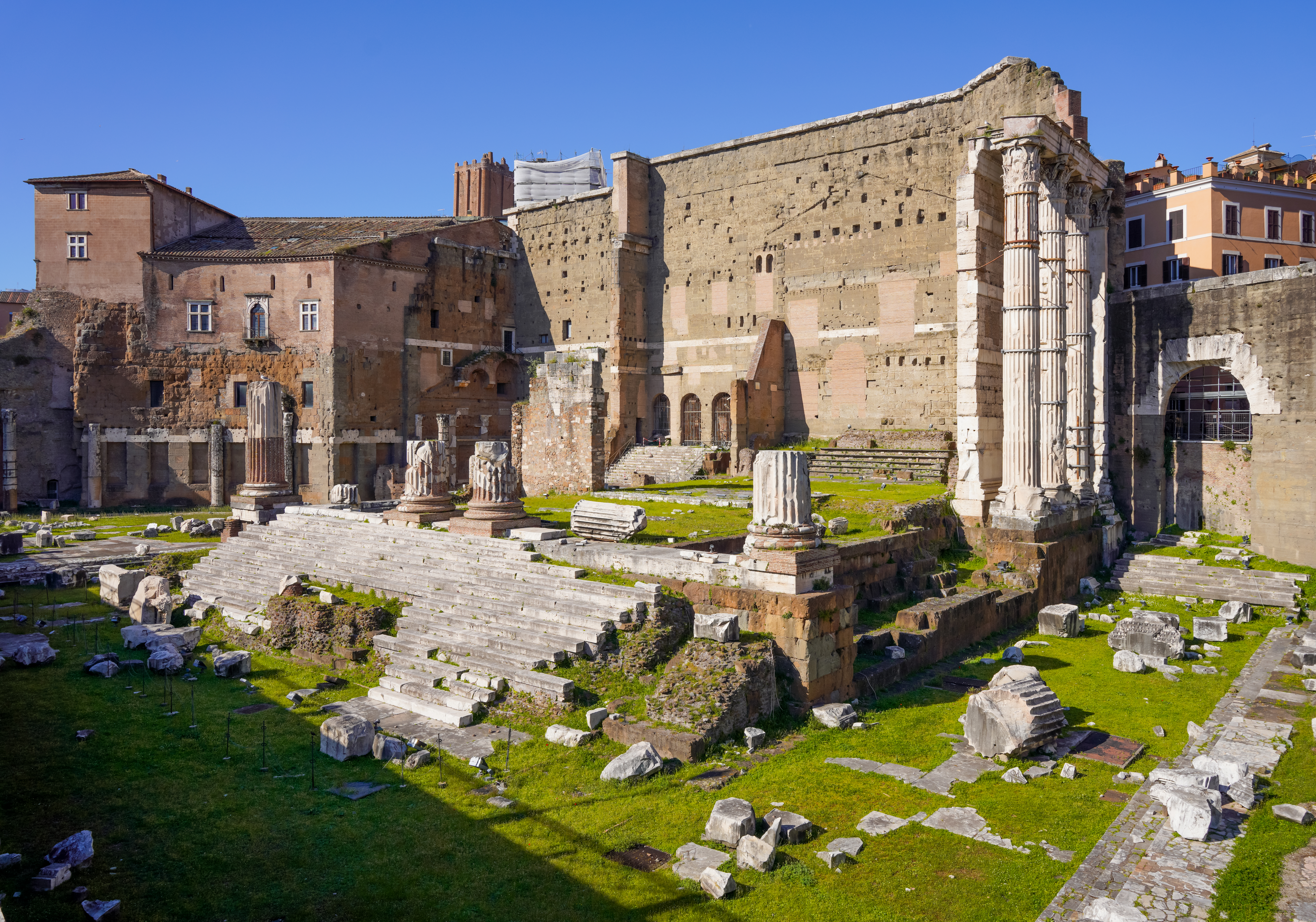
Ruin of Forum of Augustus

The Roman Forum

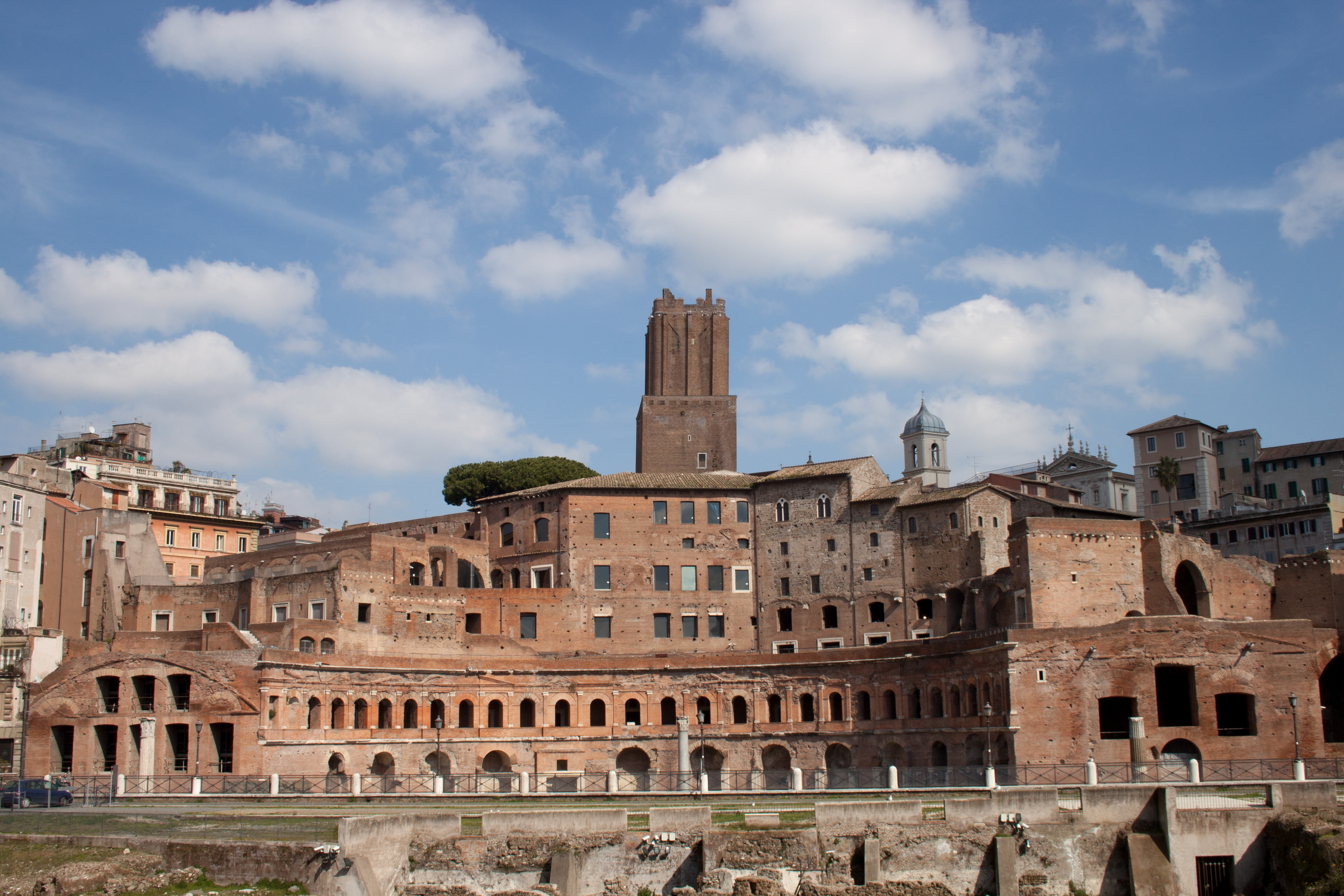
Trajan's Market

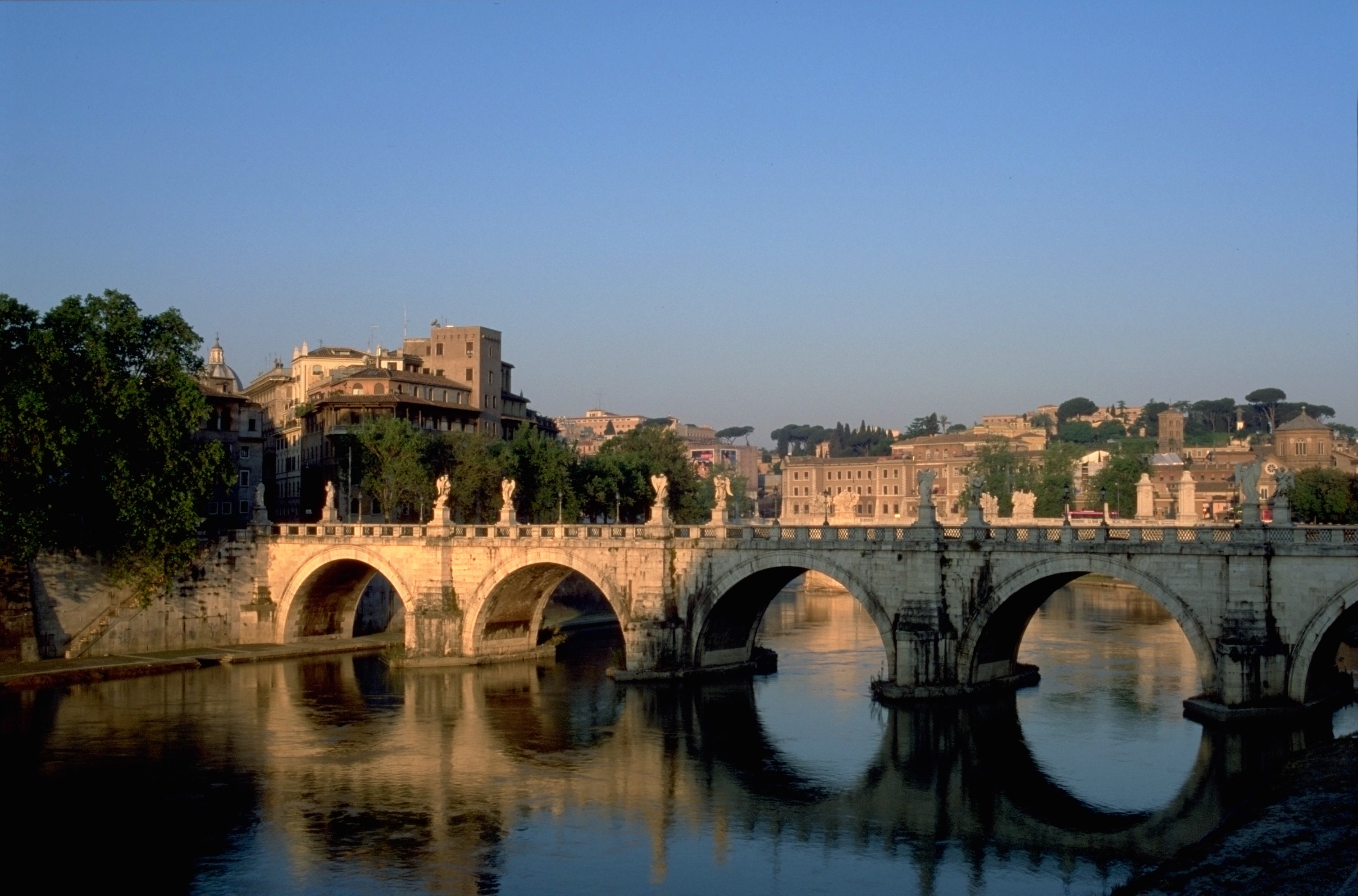
Ponte Sant'Angelo

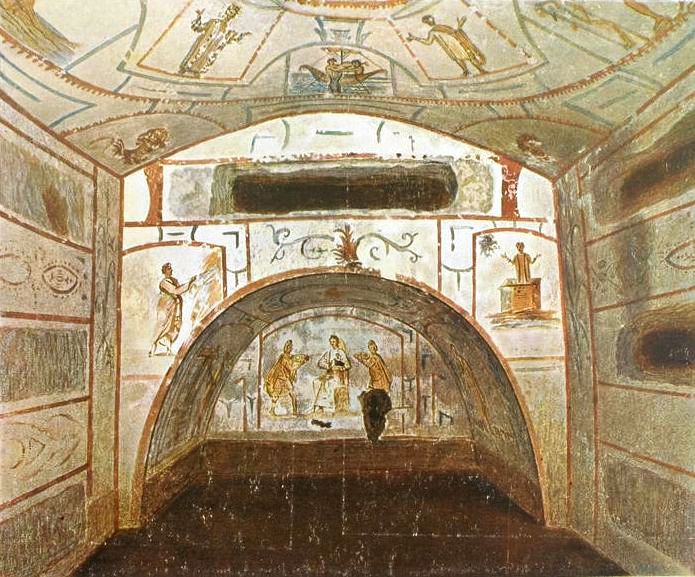
Catacombs of Marcellinus and Peter

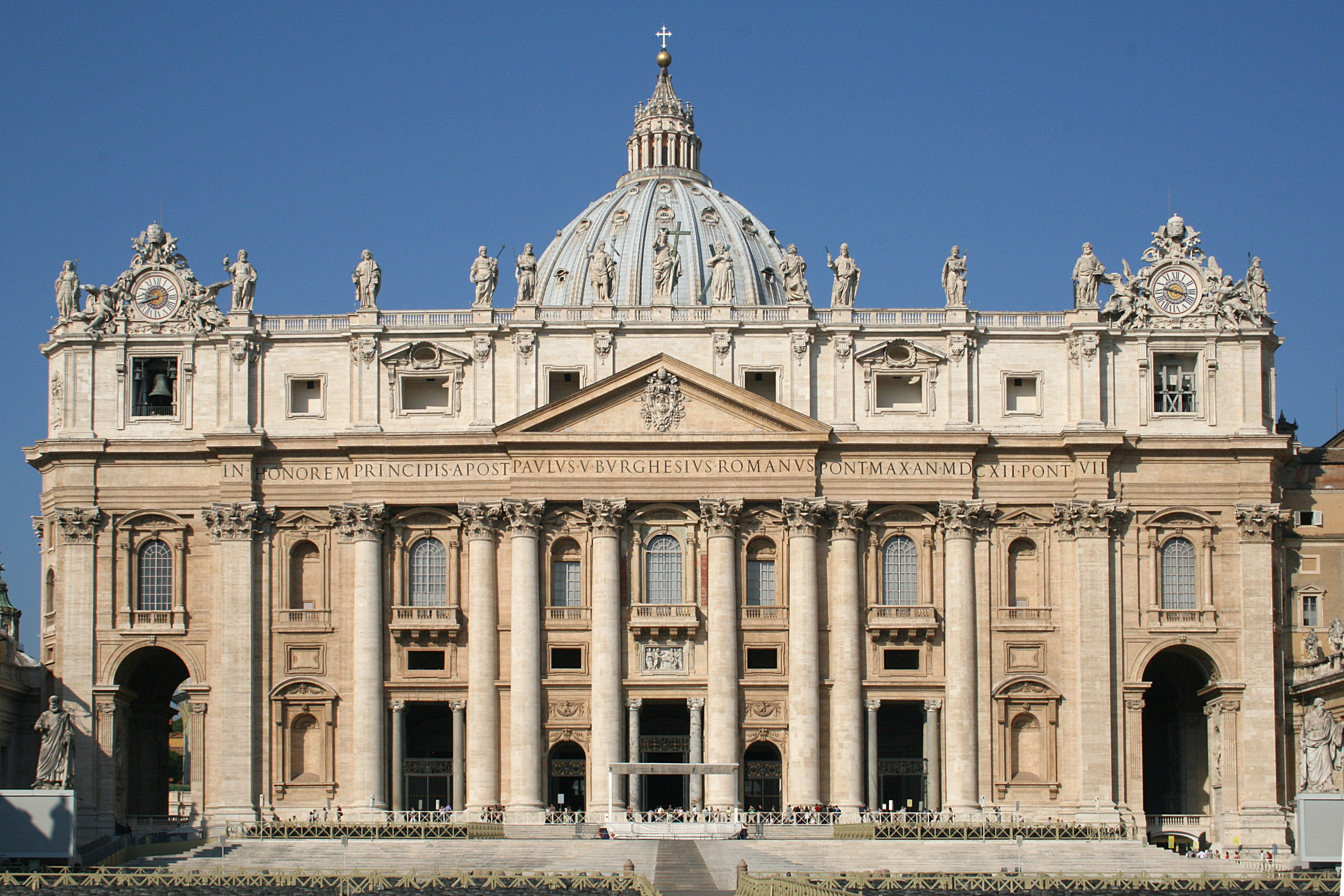
St. Peter's Basilica

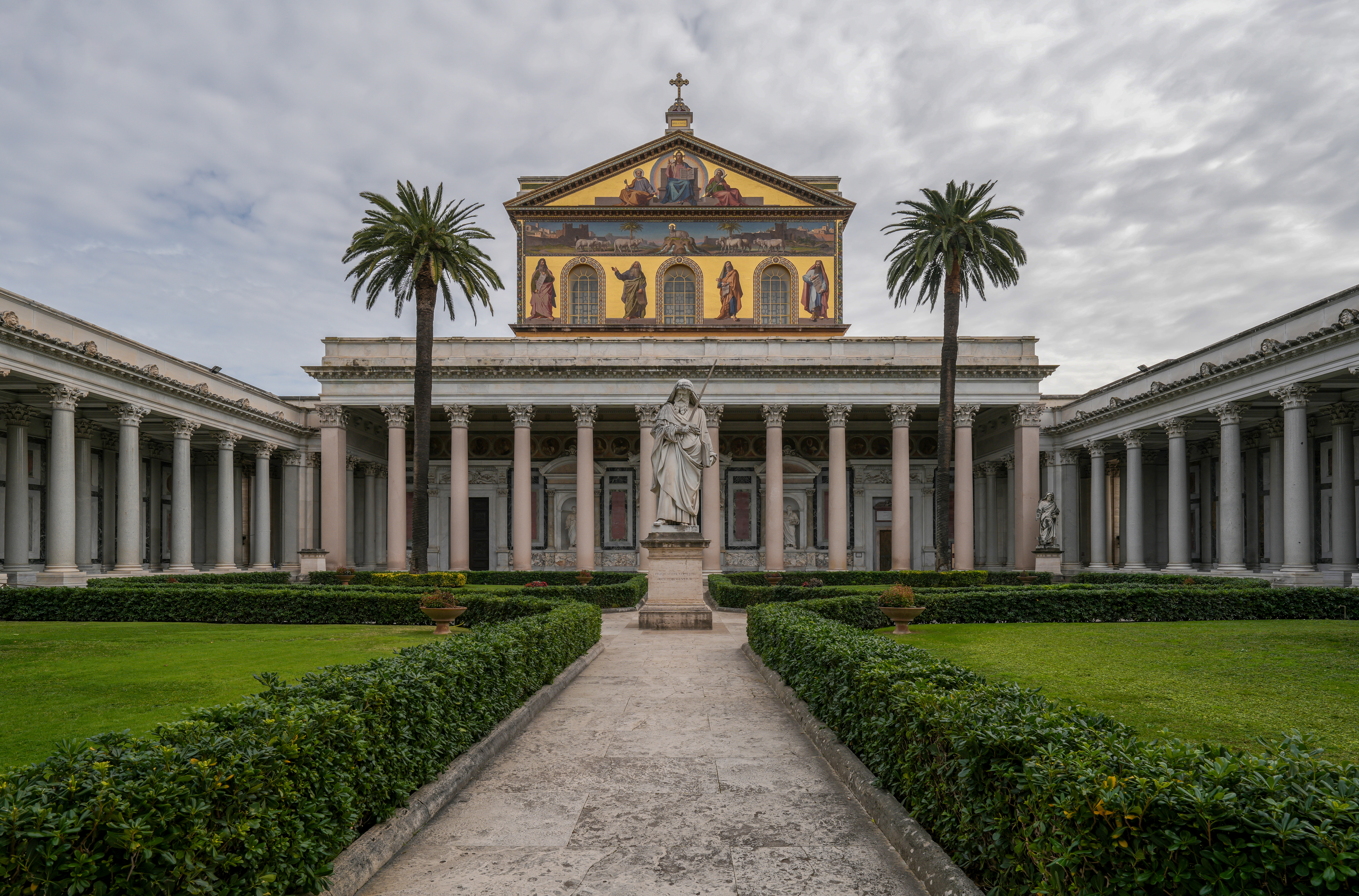
The Basilica of Saint Paul Outside the Walls

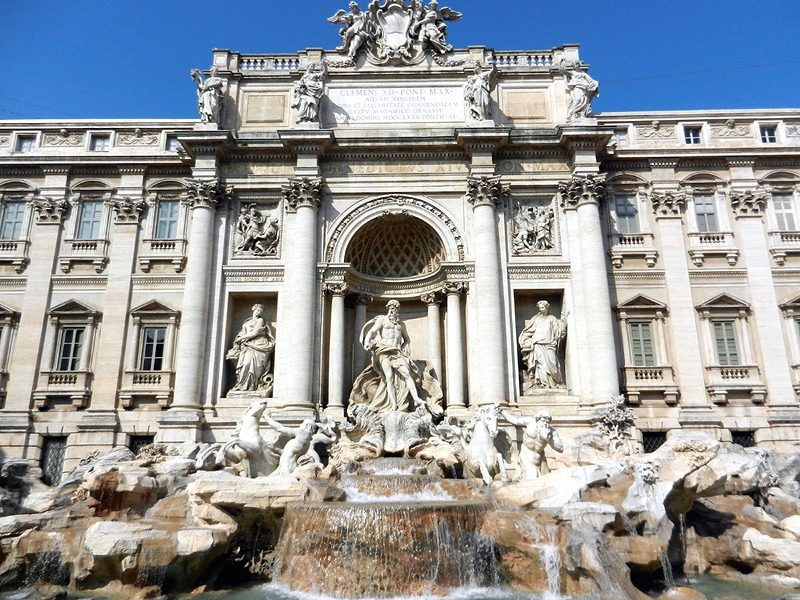
The Trevi Fountain

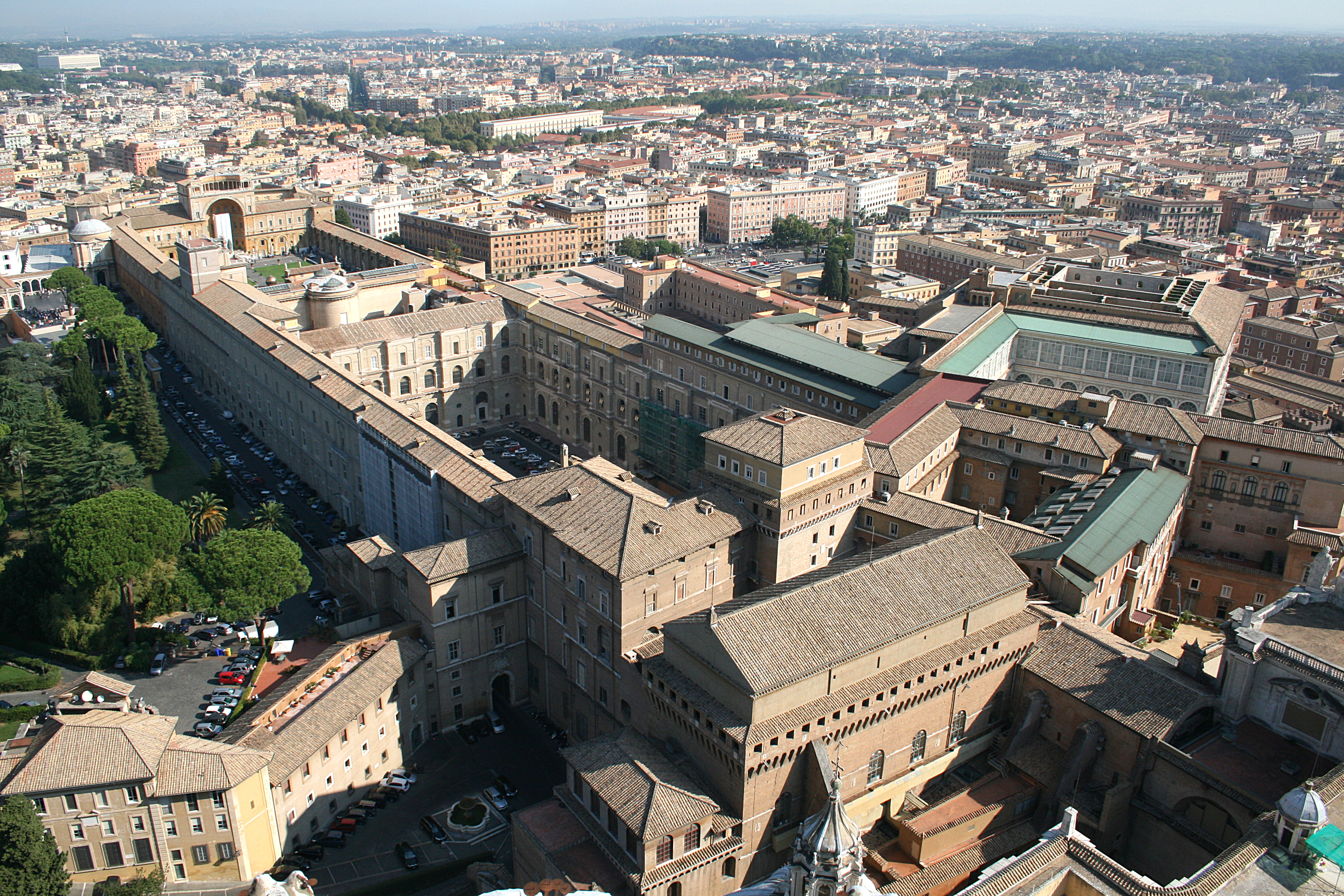
The Vatican Museums

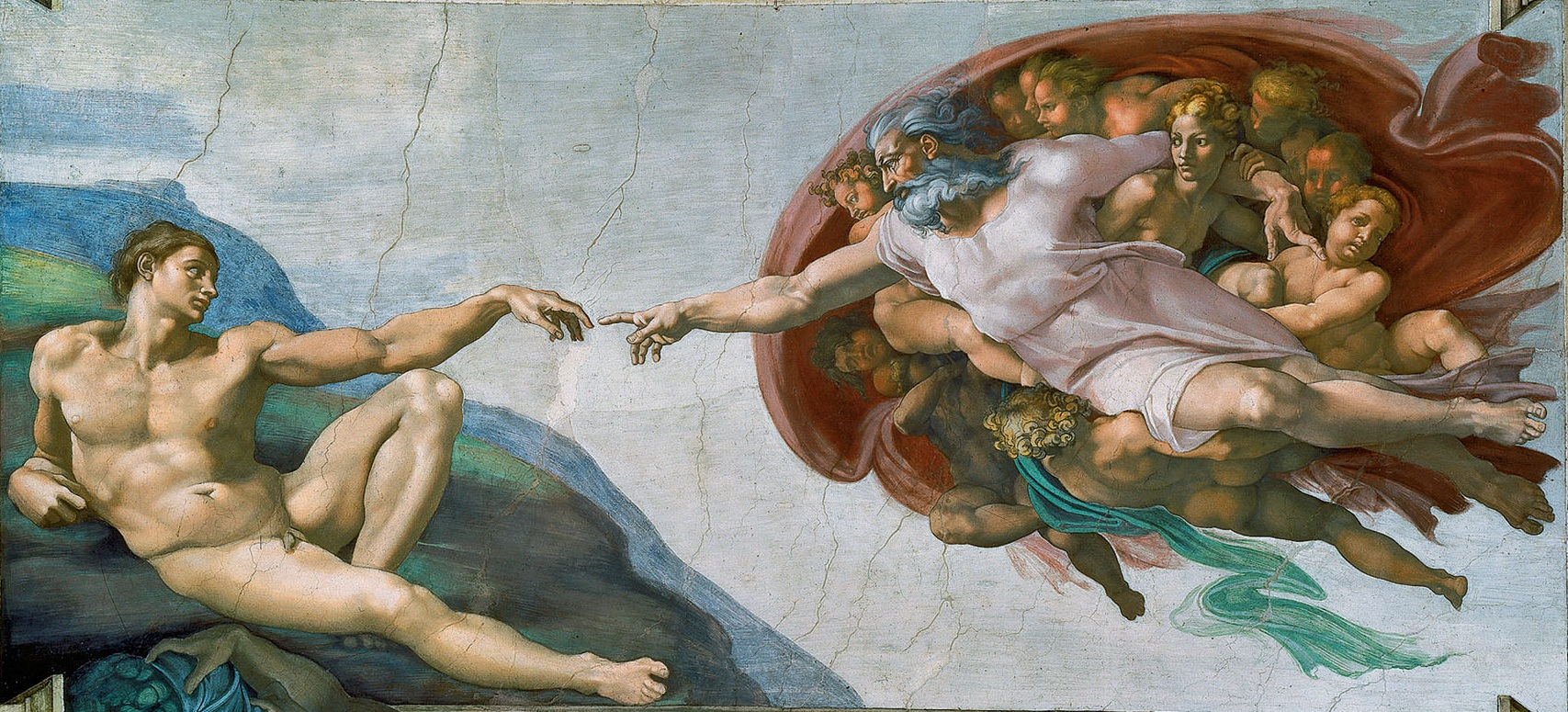
The Creation of Adam, part of the Sistine Chapel's ceiling

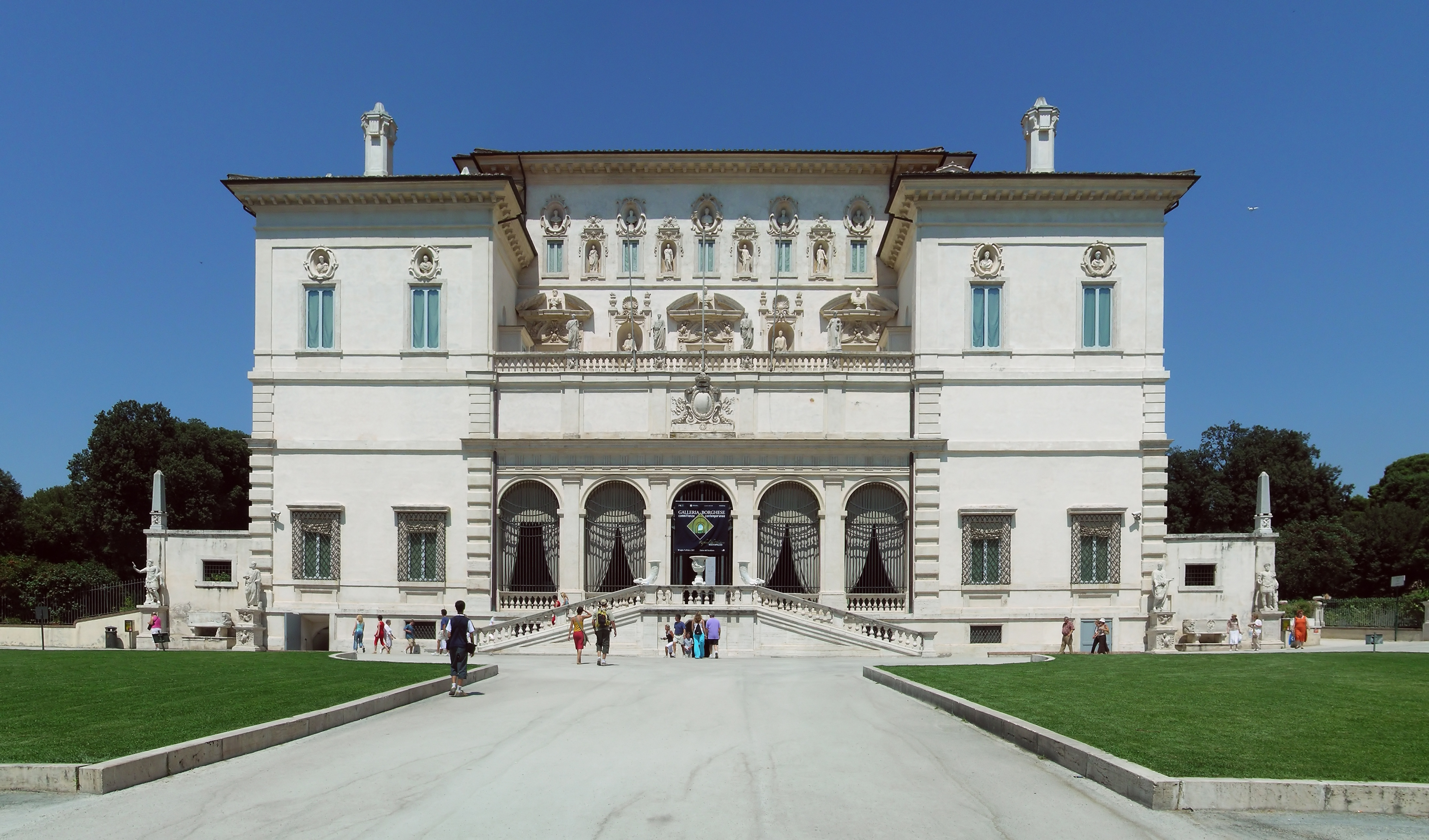
The Galleria Borghese

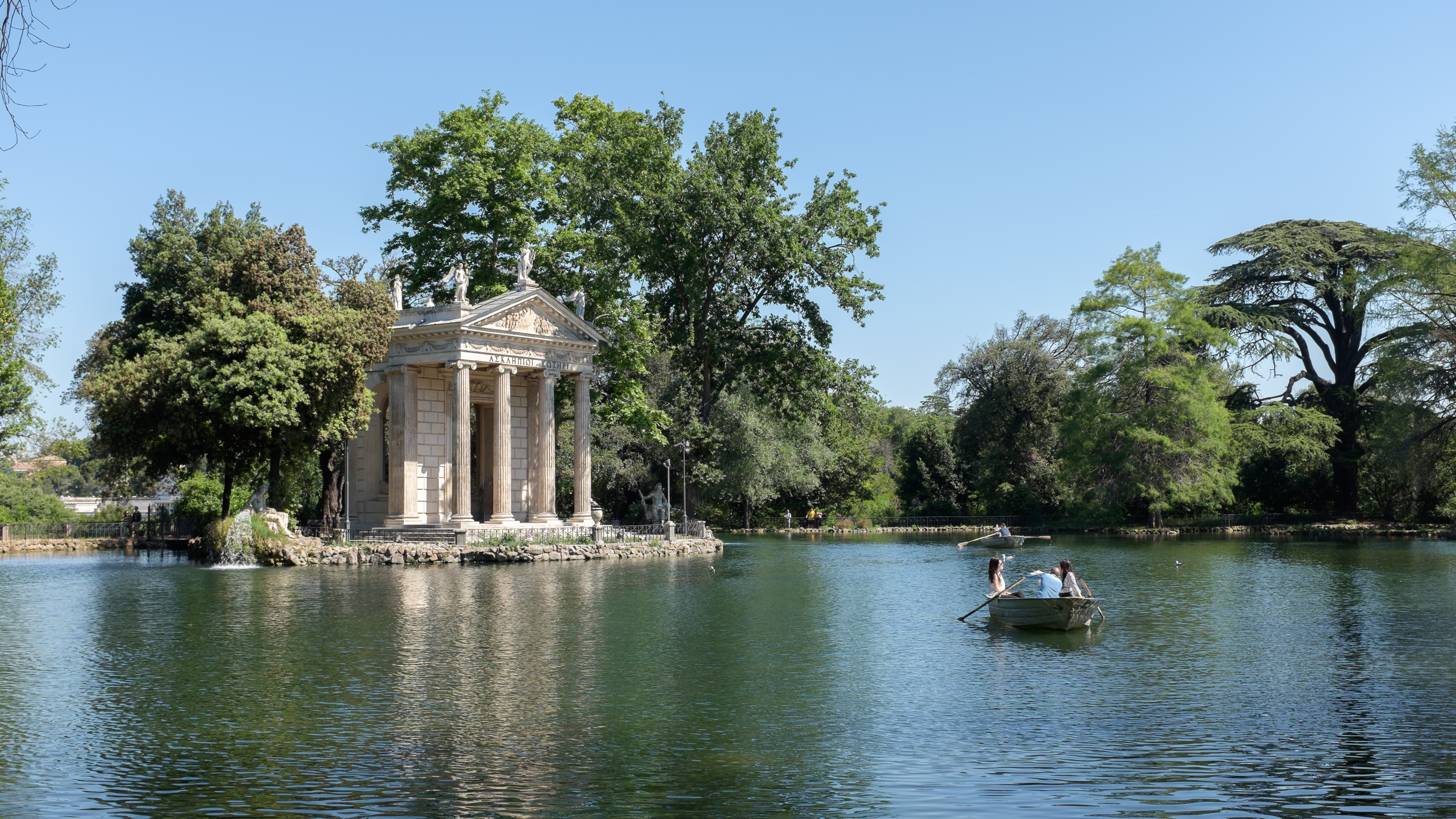
The Villa Borghese gardens

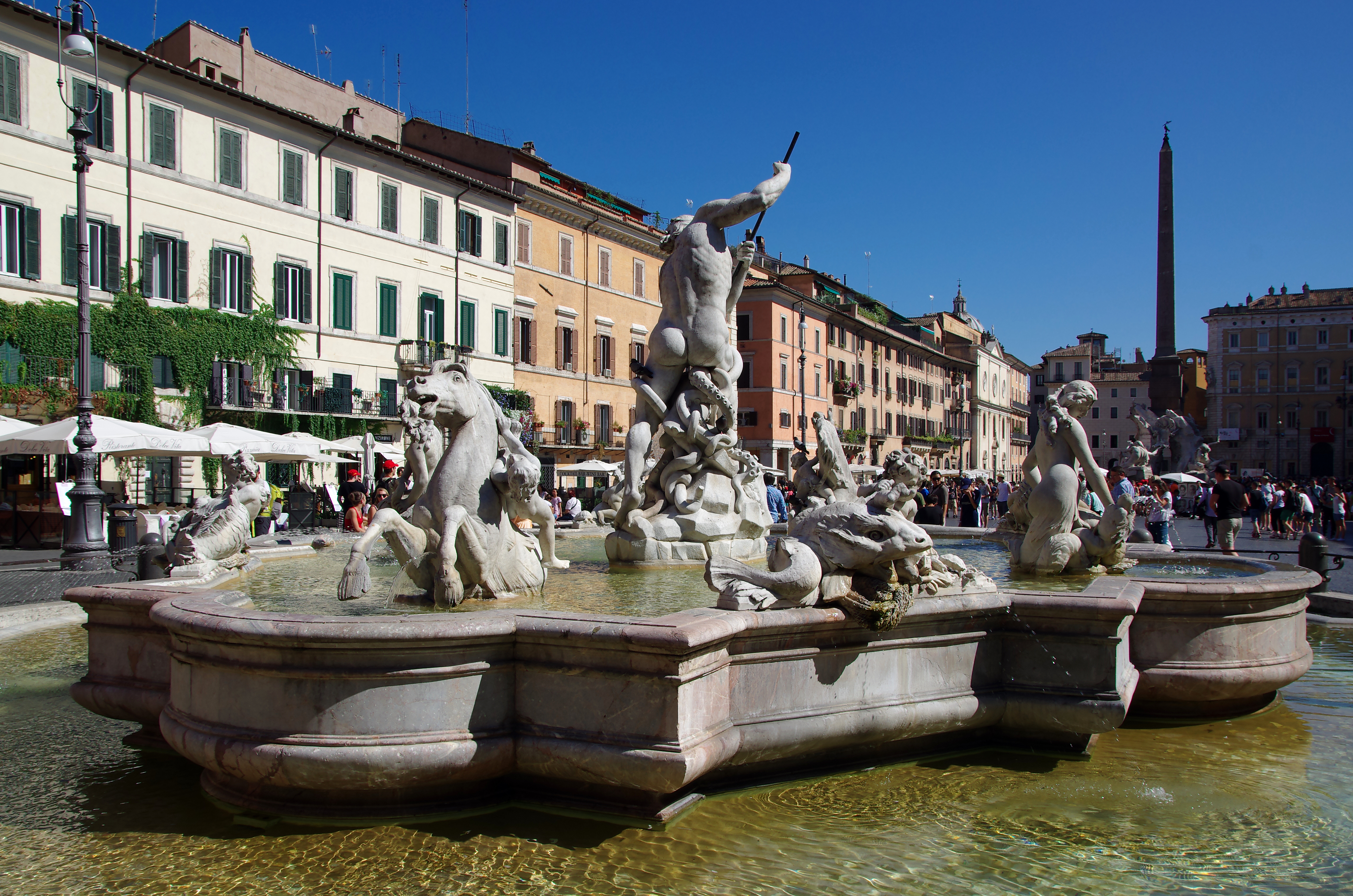
Piazza Navona

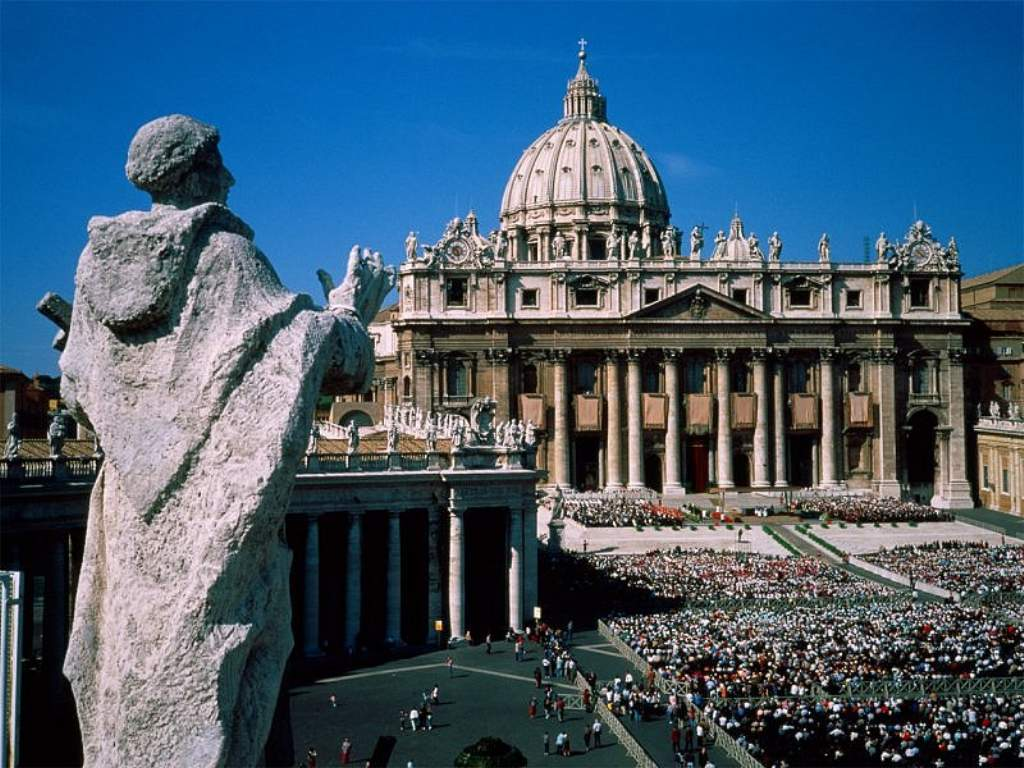
St. Peter's Square

Ancient monuments in Rome

- Amphitheater of Caligula
- Amphitheatrum Castrense
- Ancient obelisks in Rome
  - Flaminio Obelisk
  - Lateran Obelisk
  - Obelisk of Montecitorio
- Ancient temples in Rome
  - Pantheon
  - Temple of Castor and Pollux
  - Temple of Hercules Victor
  - Temple of Peace, Rome
  - Temple of Portunus
  - Temple of Saturn
  - Temple of Venus Genetrix
  - Temple of Vesta
- Ancient triumphal arches in Rome
  - Arch of Constantine
  - Arch of Septimius Severus
- Ancient villas in Rome
  - Villa of Livia
  - Villa of the Quintilii
  - Villa dei Sette Bassi
- Aqueducts in the city of Rome
  - Aqua Appia
  - Aqua Claudia
  - Aqua Marcia
- Ara Pacis
- Aurelian Walls
- Baths of Caracalla
- Baths of Titus
- Baths of Trajan
- Castel Sant'Angelo
- Circus Maximus
- Colosseum
- Column of Marcus Aurelius
- Comitium
- Domus Aurea
- Domus Transitoria
- Equestrian Statue of Marcus Aurelius
- Forum Boarium
- Forum of Augustus
- Gardens of Maecenas
- Gardens of Sallust
- House of Augustus
- Imperial fora
- Ludus Magnus
- Mausoleum of Augustus
- Pyramid of Cestius
- Roman Forum
  - Monuments of the Roman Forum
- Sant'Omobono Area
- Servian Wall
- Stadium of Domitian
- Theatre of Marcellus
- Theatre of Pompey
- Trajan's Column
- Trajan's Market

==== Bridges in Rome ====
Bridges of Rome

- Pons Cestius
- Pons Fabricius
- Ponte Milvio
- Ponte Sant'Angelo
- Ponte Sisto

==== Catacombs ====
Catacombs of Rome

- Catacomb of Callixtus
- Catacombs of Generosa
- Catacombs of Marcellinus and Peter
- Catacombs of San Sebastiano
- Catacombs of San Valentino

==== Churches in Rome ====
Basilicas and churches of Rome

- St. Peter's Basilica
  - Sistine Chapel
- Archbasilica of Saint John Lateran
- Basilica of San Clemente al Laterano
- Basilica di Santa Maria Maggiore
- Basilica of Santa Maria in Ara Coeli
- Basilica of Saint Paul Outside the Walls
- Church of the Gesù
- San Carlo alle Quattro Fontane
- Santa Croce in Gerusalemme
- Santa Maria degli Angeli e dei Martiri
- Santa Maria in Cosmedin
- Santa Maria in Trastevere
- Santa Prassede
- Santa Sabina
- Sant'Ivo alla Sapienza
- Santa Maria della Vittoria
- Santa Maria del Popolo
- San Pietro in Vincoli

==== Fountains in Rome ====
Fountains in Rome

- Fountain of Moses
- Fountain of the Four Rivers
- Fountains of St. Peter's Square
- Trevi Fountain
- Triton Fountain

==== Museums in Rome ====
Museums in Rome

- Vatican Museums
- Galleria Borghese
- Galleria Nazionale d'Arte Antica
- Doria Pamphilj Gallery
- Museum of Roman Civilization
- Capitoline Museums
- National Roman Museum
- National Museum of Oriental Art

==== Palaces in Rome ====
Palaces in Rome

- Palazzo Barberini
- Palazzo Chigi
- Palazzo Colonna
- Palazzo Corsini
- Palazzo Farnese
- Quirinal Palace
- Palazzo Pamphilj

==== Parks and gardens in Rome ====
Parks and gardens in Rome

- Appian Way Regional Park
- Orange Garden
- Parco Adriano
- Parco degli Acquedotti
- Park of the Caffarella
- Rome Rose Garden
- Villa Ada
- Villa Borghese gardens
- Villa Doria Pamphili
- Villa Torlonia

==== Public squares in Rome ====
Piazzas in Rome

- Campo de' Fiori
- Largo di Torre Argentina
- Piazza Barberini
- Piazza Bocca della Verità
- Piazza Colonna
- Piazza d'Aracoeli
- Piazza del Popolo
- Piazza della Minerva
- Piazza della Repubblica
- Piazza di Monte Citorio
- Piazza Navona
- Piazza di Spagna
- Piazza Venezia
- St. Peter's Square

==== Streets of Rome ====
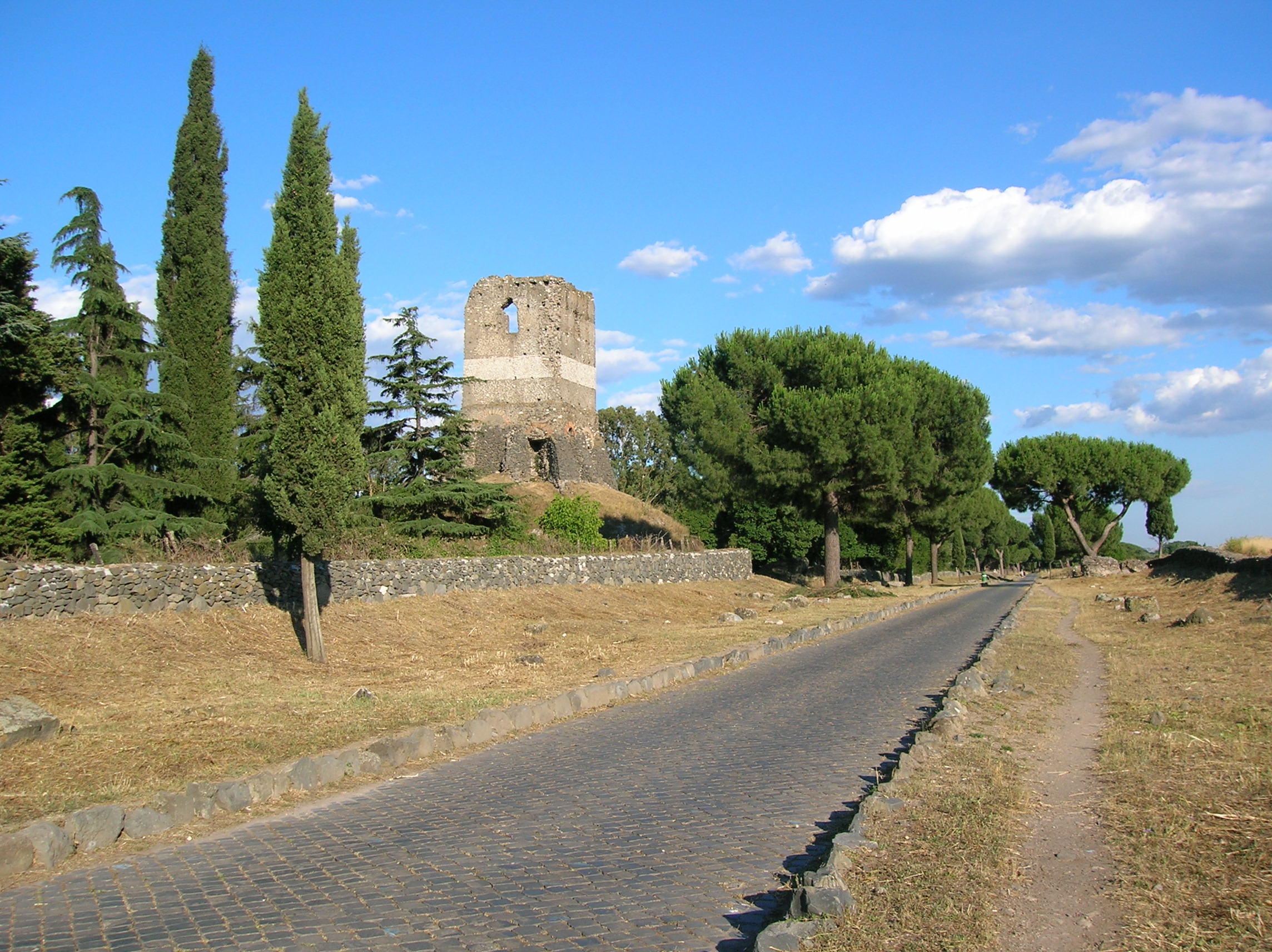
Via Appia antica

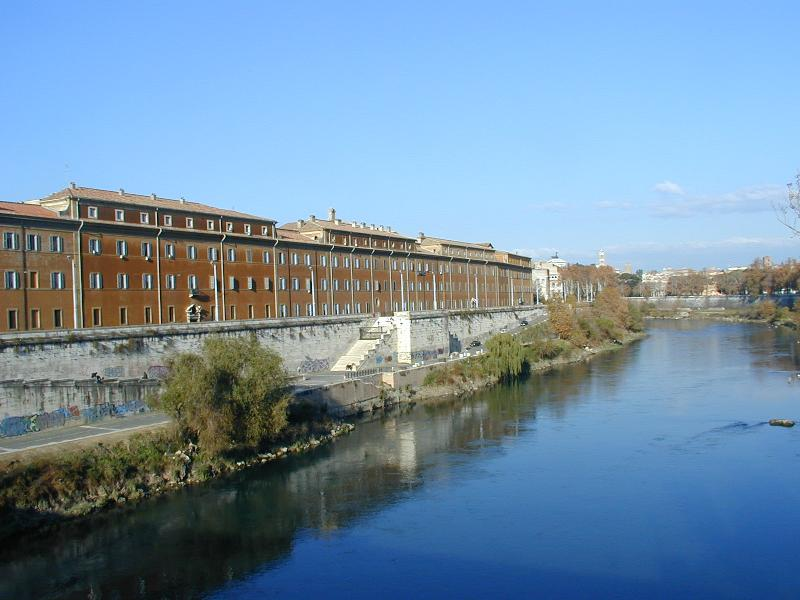
Lungotevere Ripa, overlooked by the complex of San Michele a Ripa

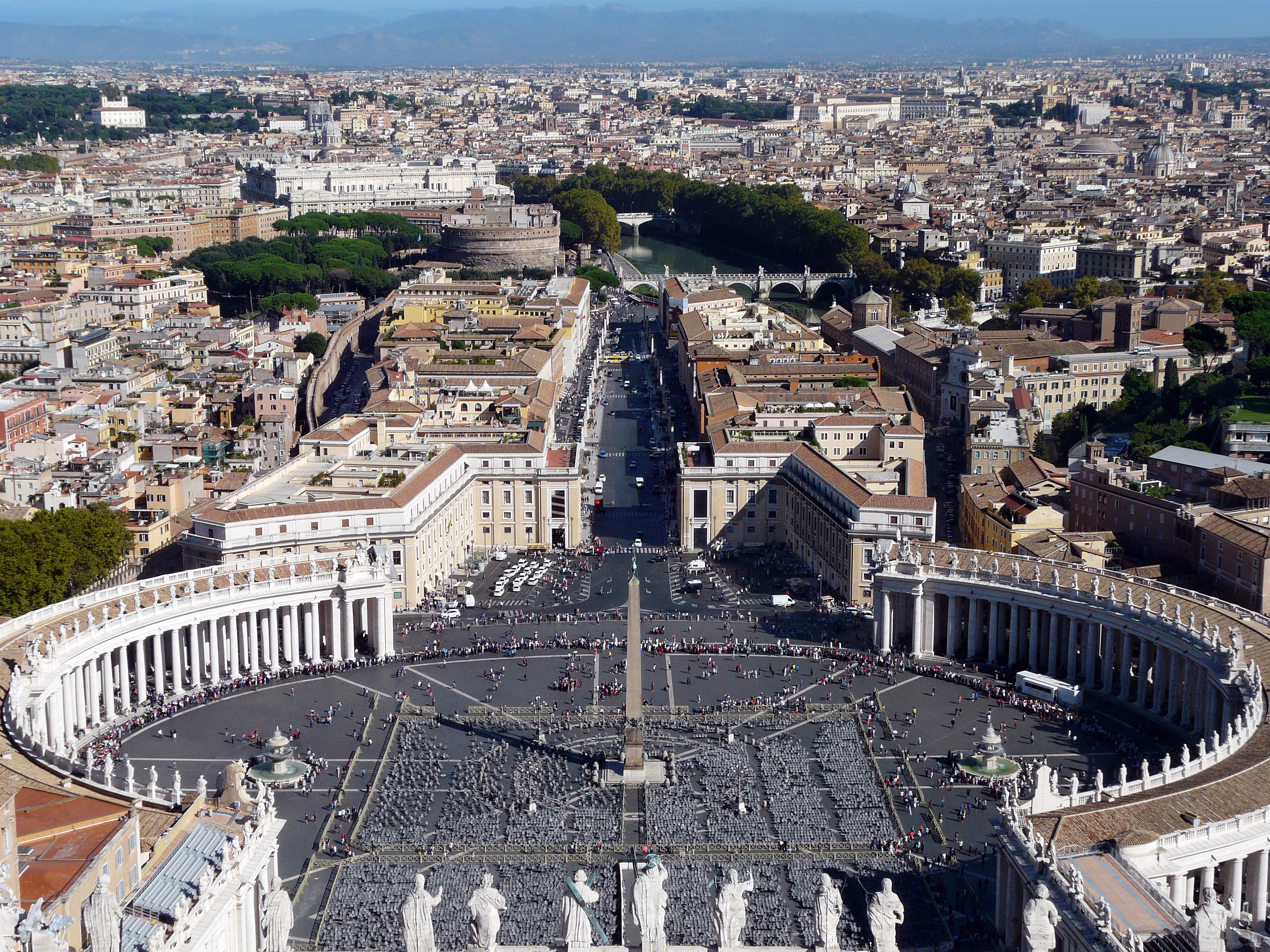
Via della Conciliazione, which connects Saint Peter's Square to the Castel Sant'Angelo

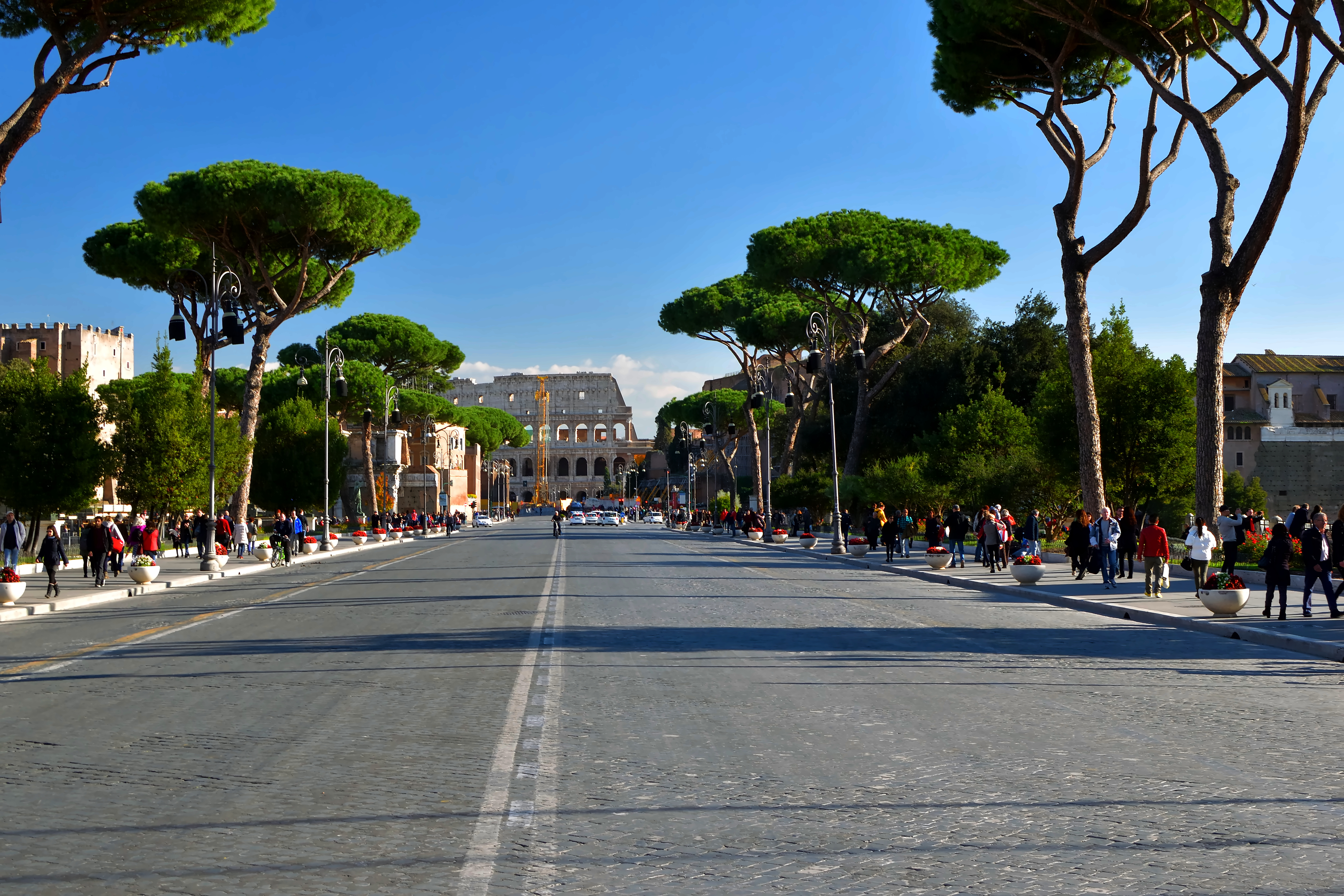
Via dei Fori Imperiali

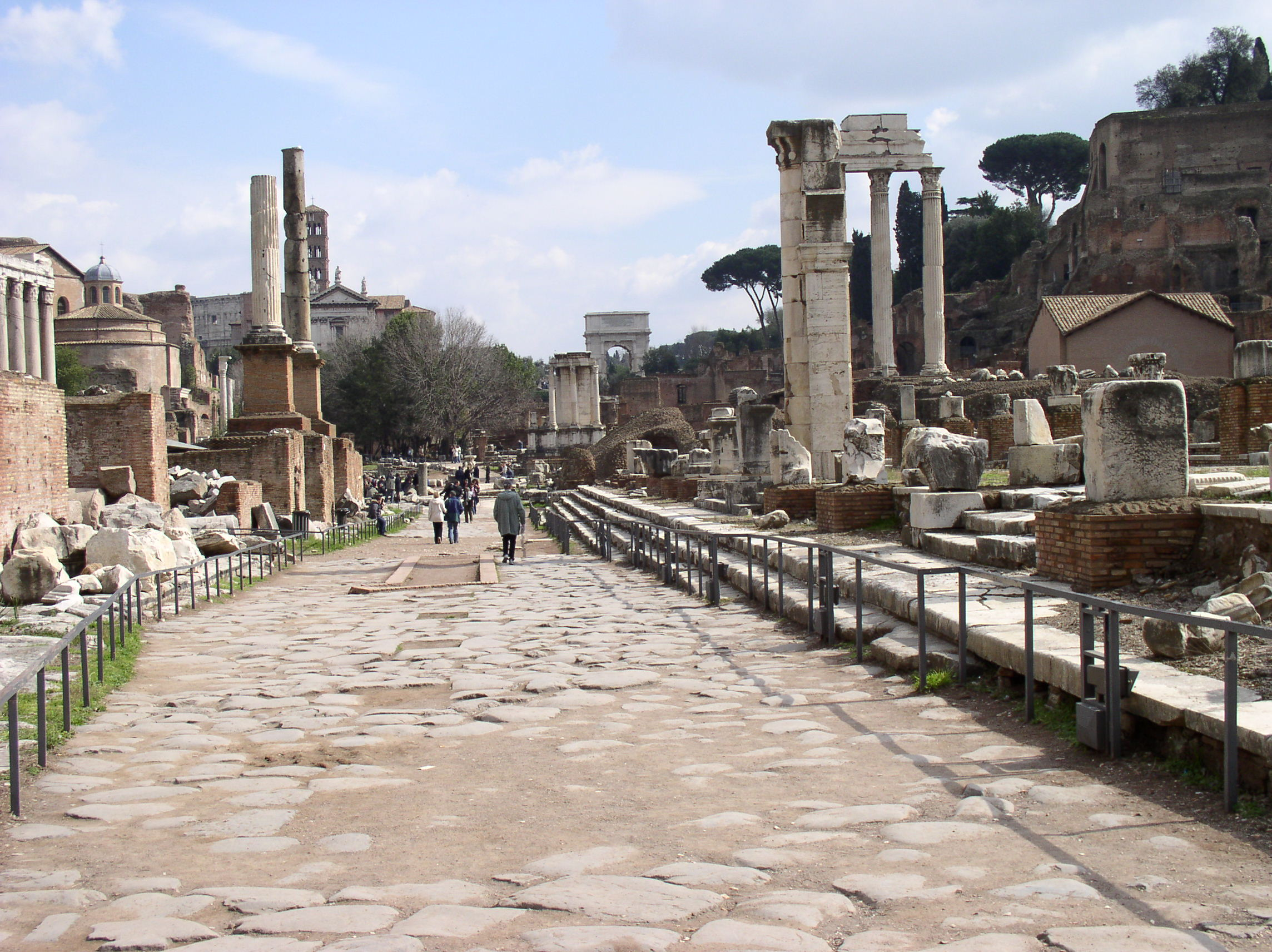
Via Sacra

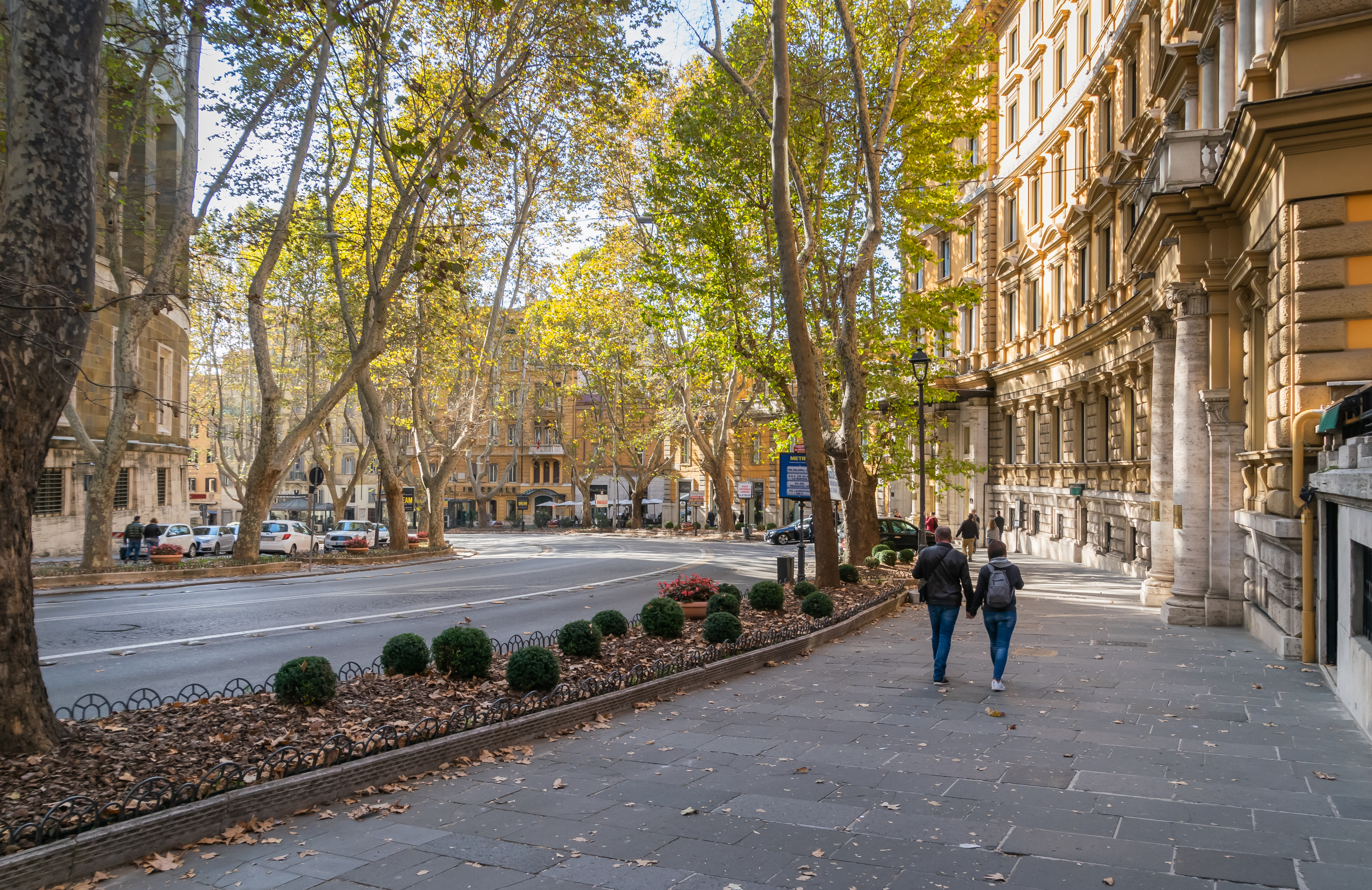
Via Veneto

Streets in Rome

- Appian Way
- Clivus Capitolinus
- Corso di Francia
- Corso Vittorio Emanuele II
- Lungoteveres in Rome
  - Lungotevere on the right bank of the Tiber
    - Lungotevere Maresciallo Diaz
    - Lungotevere Maresciallo Cadorna
    - Lungotevere Della Vittoria
    - Lungotevere Guglielmo Oberdan
    - Lungotevere delle Armi
    - Lungotevere Michelangelo
    - Lungotevere dei Mellini
    - Lungotevere Prati
    - Lungotevere Castello
    - Lungotevere Vaticano
    - Lungotevere in Sassia
    - Lungotevere Gianicolense
    - Lungotevere della Farnesina
    - Lungotevere Raffaello Sanzio
    - Lungotevere degli Anguillara
    - Lungotevere degli Alberteschi
    - Lungotevere Ripa
    - Lungotevere Portuense
    - Lungotevere degli Artigiani
    - Lungotevere Vittorio Gassman
    - Lungotevere di Pietra Papa
    - Lungotevere degli Inventori
    - Lungotevere della Magliana
  - Lungotevere on the left bank of the Tiber
    - Lungotevere dell'Acqua Acetosa
    - Lungotevere Salvo D'Acquisto
    - Lungotevere Grande Ammiraglio Thaon di Revel
    - Lungotevere Flaminio
    - Lungotevere delle Navi
    - Lungotevere Arnaldo da Brescia
    - Lungotevere in Augusta
    - Lungotevere Marzio
    - Lungotevere Tor di Nona
    - Lungotevere degli Altoviti
    - Lungotevere dei Fiorentini
    - Lungotevere dei Sangallo
    - Lungotevere dei Tebaldi
    - Lungotevere dei Vallati
    - Lungotevere De' Cenci
    - Lungotevere dei Pierleoni
    - Lungotevere Aventino
    - Lungotevere Testaccio
    - Lungotevere di San Paolo
    - Lungotevere Dante
- Via Cavour
- Via Condotti
- Via Cristoforo Colombo
- Via del Corso
- Via della Conciliazione
- Via dei Coronari
- Via dei Fori Imperiali
- Via Nazionale
- Via Sacra
- Via Veneto

=== Demographics of Rome ===
Demographics of Rome

== Government and politics of Rome ==
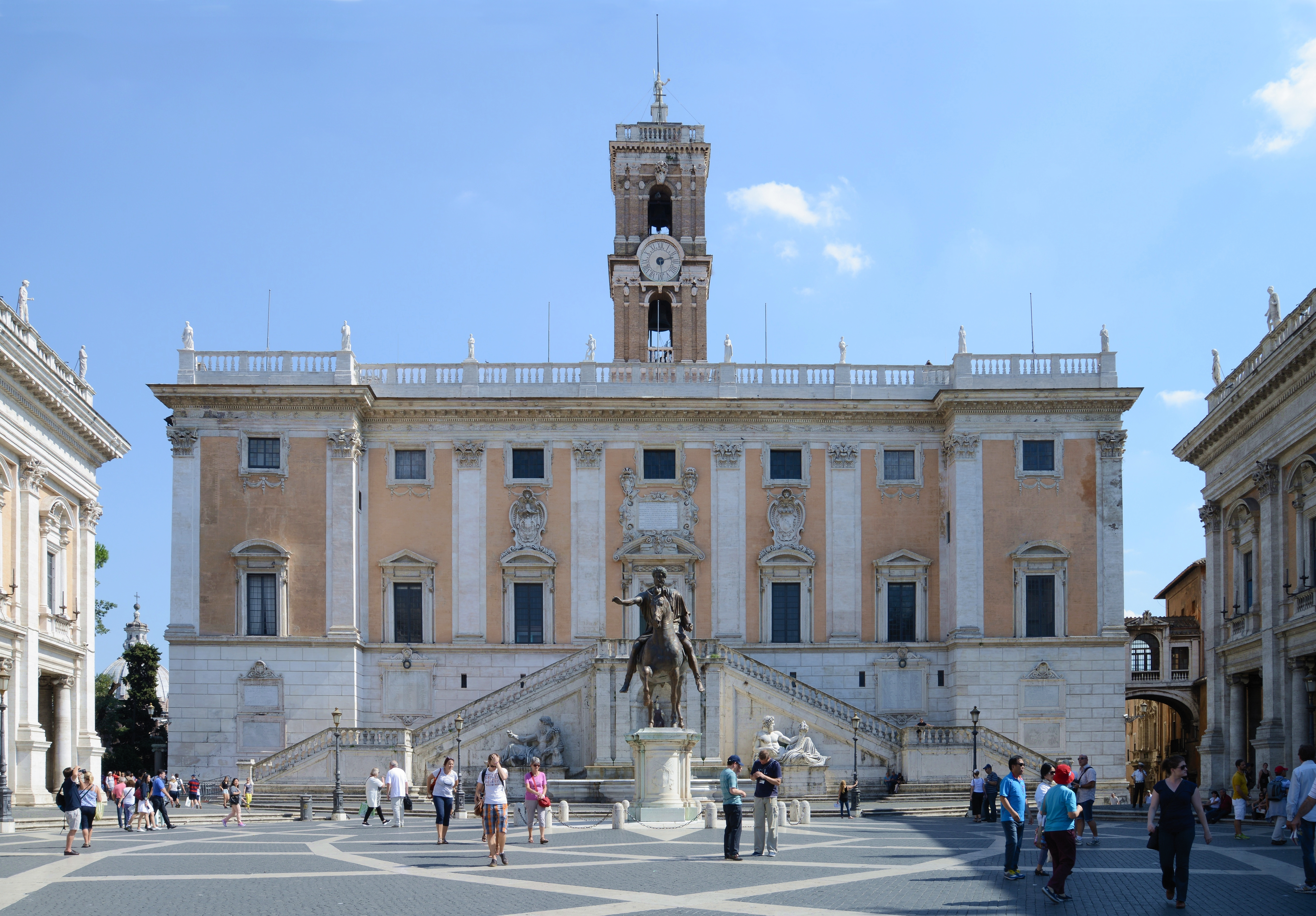
Palazzo Senatorio, seat of the local government

Government of Rome

- Administrative subdivision of Rome
- Metropolitan City of Rome Capital
  - Mayor of Rome

=== Law and order in Rome ===
- Carabinieri
  - Corazzieri

=== Military in Rome ===
- Granatieri di Sardegna Mechanized Brigade

== History of Rome ==
History of Rome

- Timeline of Roman history
- Timeline of the city of Rome

=== History of Rome, by period or event ===
Timeline of the city of Rome

- Rome during the Roman Kingdom (c. 753-509 BC)
  - Founding of Rome (circa 752 BC)
    - Founding myth: Romulus and Remus
  - Overthrow of the Roman monarchy (509 BC) – expulsion of the last king of Rome, Lucius Tarquinius Superbus, and the establishment of the Roman Republic.
- Rome during the Roman Republic (509-27 BC)
  - Siege of Rome (508 BC) – Rome is besieged by the city of Clusium
  - Sack of Rome (390 BC) – Rome is sacked by the Senones, after the Battle of the Allia
- Rise of Rome (circa 100 BC to the 4th century AD)
  - Rome during the Roman Empire (27 BC-285 AD)
    - List of Roman emperors
    - Great Fire of Rome (64 AD)
- Rome during the Western Roman Empire (285-476AD)
  - Sack of Rome (410) – Rome is besieged and sacked by Alaric, King of the Visigoths
  - Sack of Rome (455) – Rome is besieged and sacked by Genseric, King of the Vandals
  - Deposition of Romulus Augustulus (476) – marked the end of the Western Roman Empire, and the beginning of the European Middle Ages
- Rome during the Kingdom of Odoacer (476–493)
- Rome during the Ostrogothic Kingdom (493–553)
  - Siege of Rome (537–538) – Belisarius defends the city against the Ostrogoths
  - Siege of Rome (546) – Rome is besieged, sacked and depopulated by Totila, King of the Ostrogoths, Rome during the Gothic War
  - Siege of Rome (549–550) – Rome is besieged and captured by Totila, King of the Ostrogoths, Rome during the Gothic War
- Rome during the Eastern Roman Empire (553–754)
- Rome during the Papal States (754–1870)
  - Siege of Rome (756) – Rome is besieged by the Lombard prince Aistulf
  - Arab raid against Rome (846) – Saracen raiders plundered the outskirts of the city of Rome, sacking the basilicas of Old St Peter's and St Paul's-Outside-the-Walls, but were prevented from entering the city itself by the Aurelian Wall.
  - Sack of Rome (1084) – Rome is sacked by the Normans under Robert Guiscard
  - Roman Renaissance – mid-15th to the mid-16th centuries
    - Banquet of Chestnuts
    - Sack of Rome (1527) – Rome is sacked by the mutinous troops of Charles V, Holy Roman Emperor, marking the end of the Roman Renaissance.
  - Annexation of Rome by France – the French invaded, under the rule of Napoleon Bonaparte, establishing the Department of Rome. Rome became a canton within the Arrondissement of Rome.
- Rome during the Kingdom of Italy (1870–1946)
  - Capture of Rome – Rome was captured by Italian forces in September 1870, ending the Risorgimento, and establishing Rome as the capital of the Kingdom of Italy. It marked both the final defeat of the Papal States under Pope Pius IX and the unification of the Italian peninsula under King Victor Emmanuel II of the House of Savoy.
  - Lateran Treaty – treaty signed between Italy and the Catholic Church in 1929. It settled the Roman Question, established the Holy See as a sovereign entity, and recognized Vatican City as an independent state and the sovereign territory of the Holy See, within Rome.
    - Holy See – headquartered in its sovereign territory, Vatican City.
    - Vatican City (outline) – established in 1929 in the Lateran Treaty as the sovereign territory of the Holy See. It becomes an enclave, within Rome.
- Rome during the Italian Republic (1946–present)

=== History of Rome, by subject ===
- List of popes
- History of sports in Rome
  - History of racing in Rome
    - Rome Grand Prix

== Culture in Rome ==
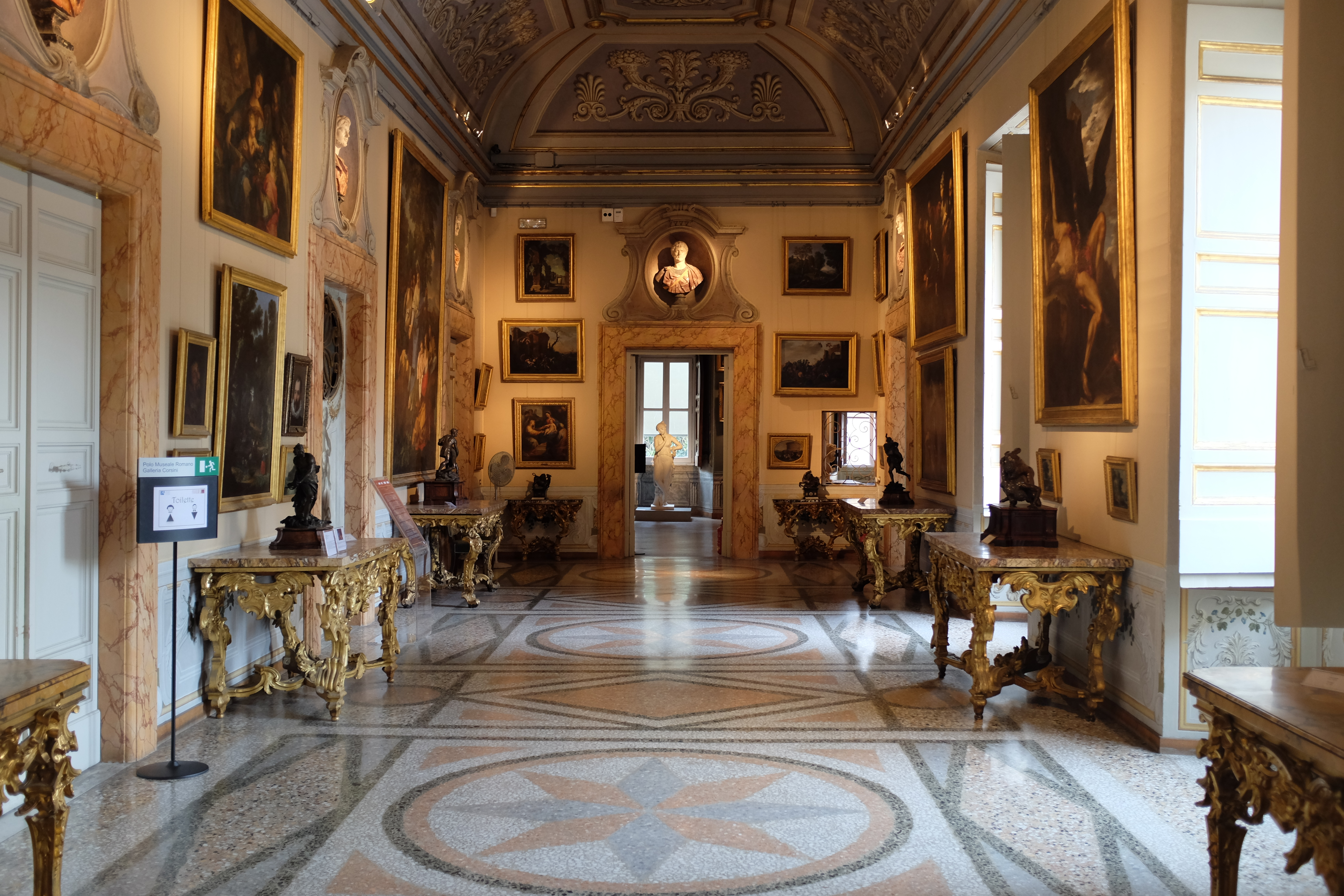
Art exhibition in the Palazzo Corsini

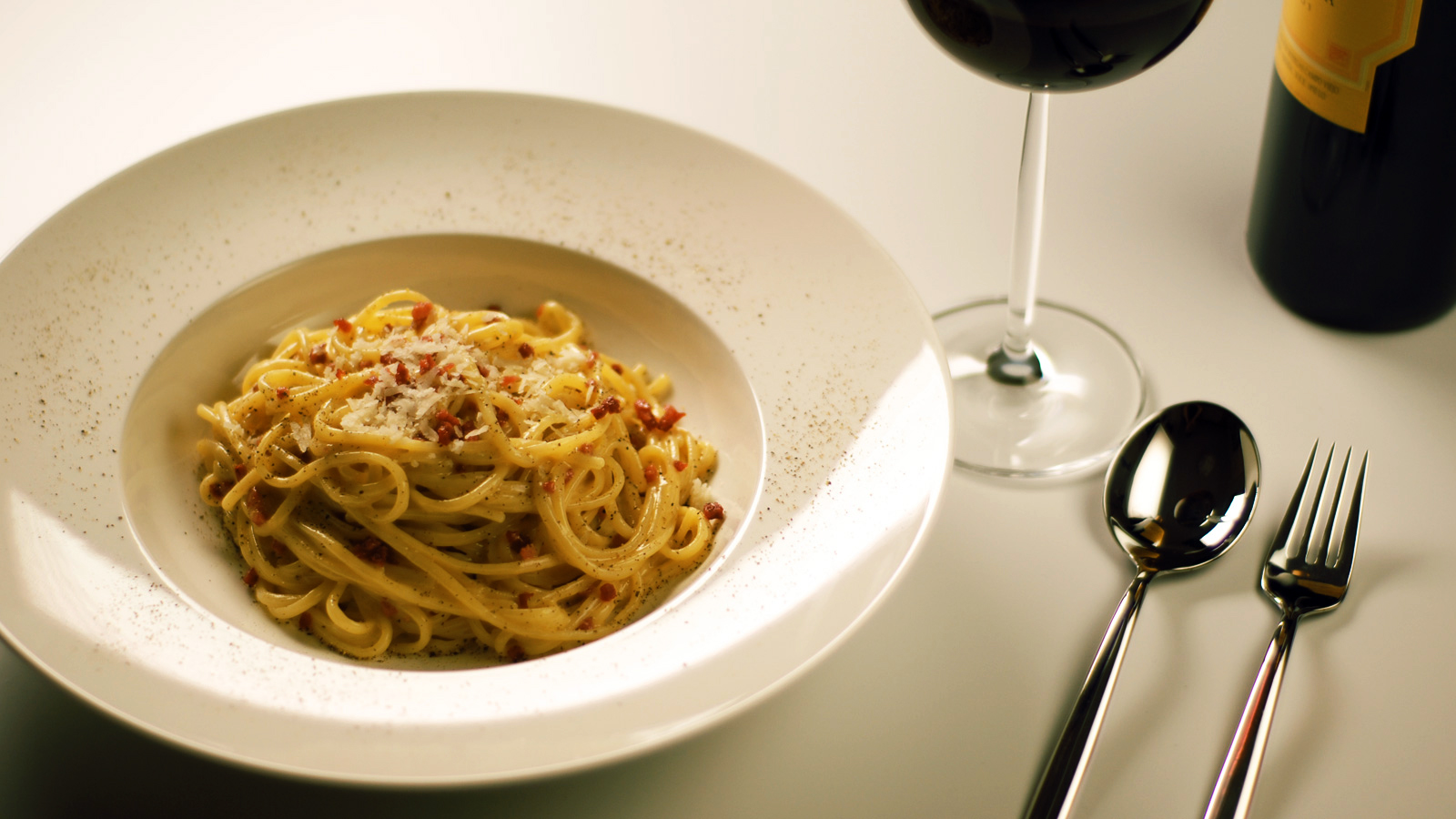
Carbonara, an Italian pasta dish from Rome

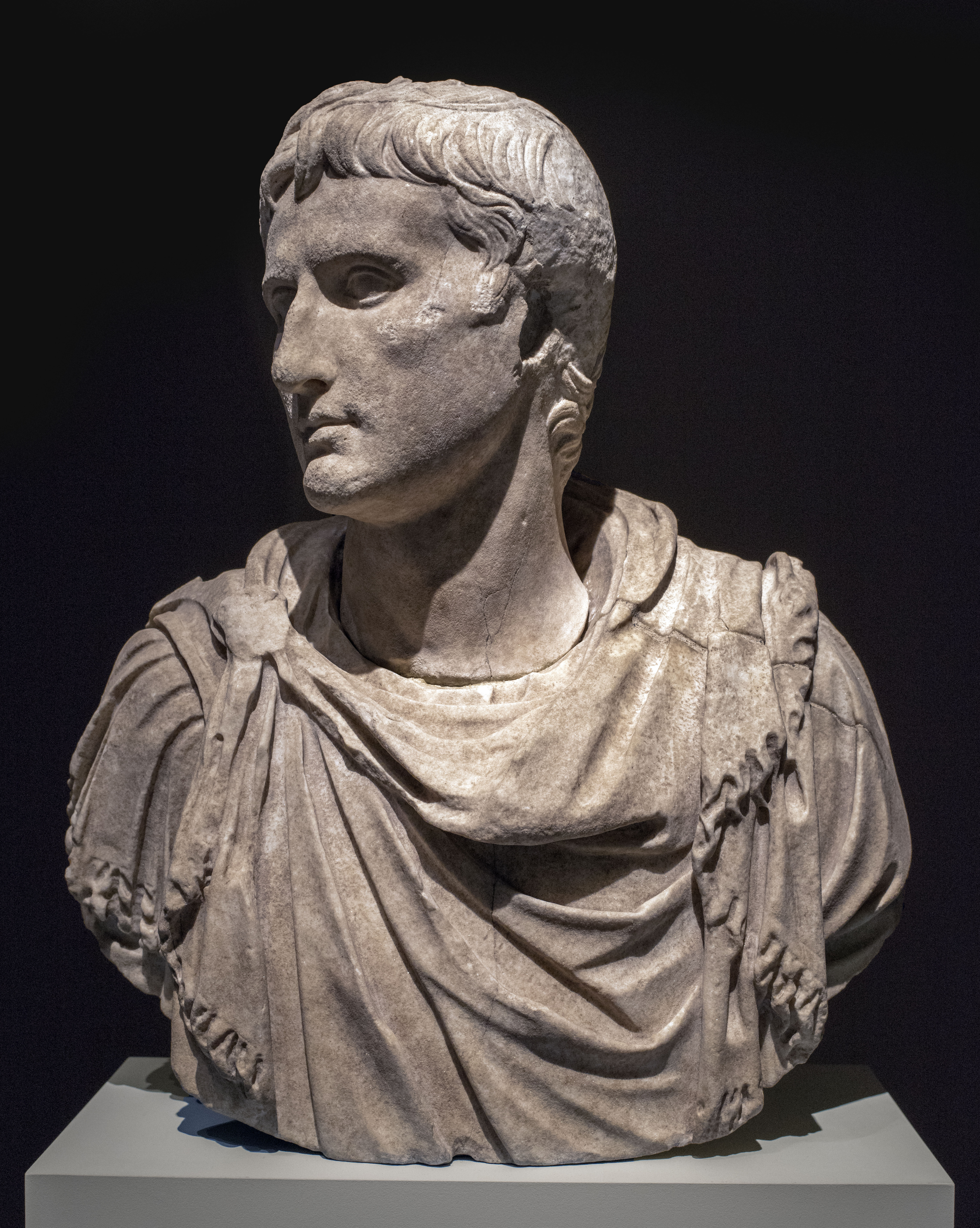
Bust of Augustus, a fine example of Roman portraiture

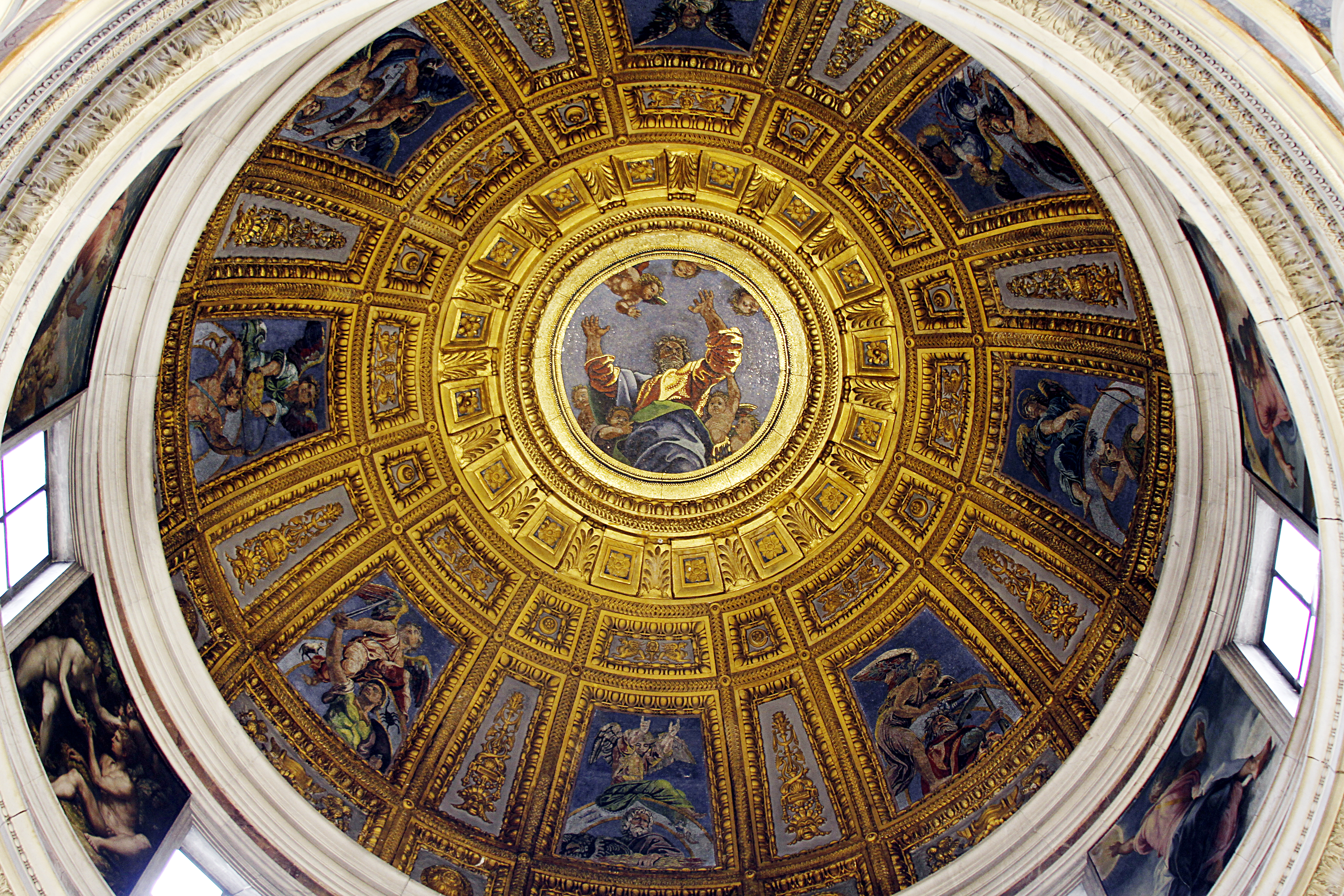
Chigi Chapel, the dome with mosaics by the Renaissance artist Raphael

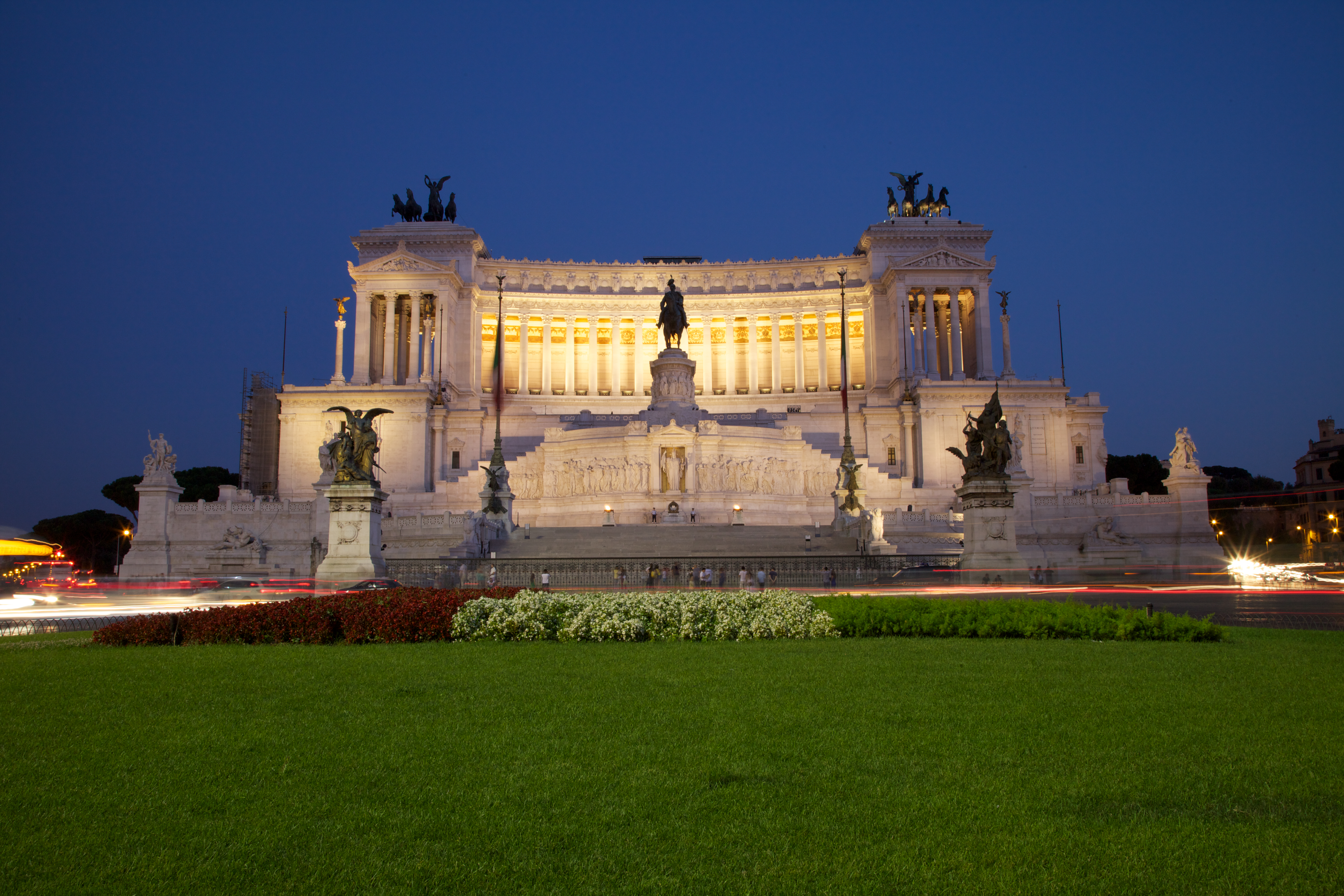
Altare della Patria, the best-known symbol of Roman neoclassical architecture

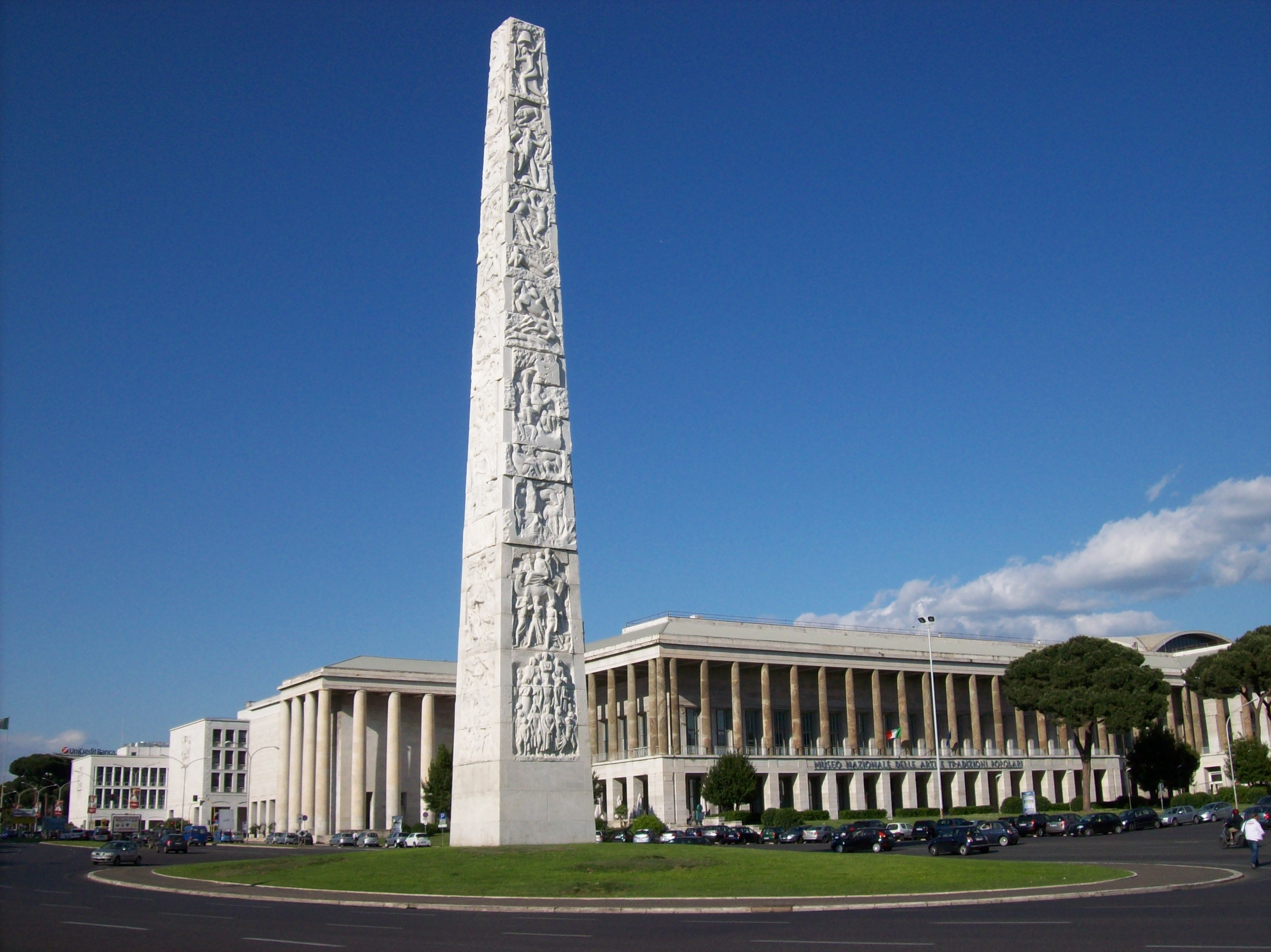
EUR, Rome, Guglielmo Marconi square

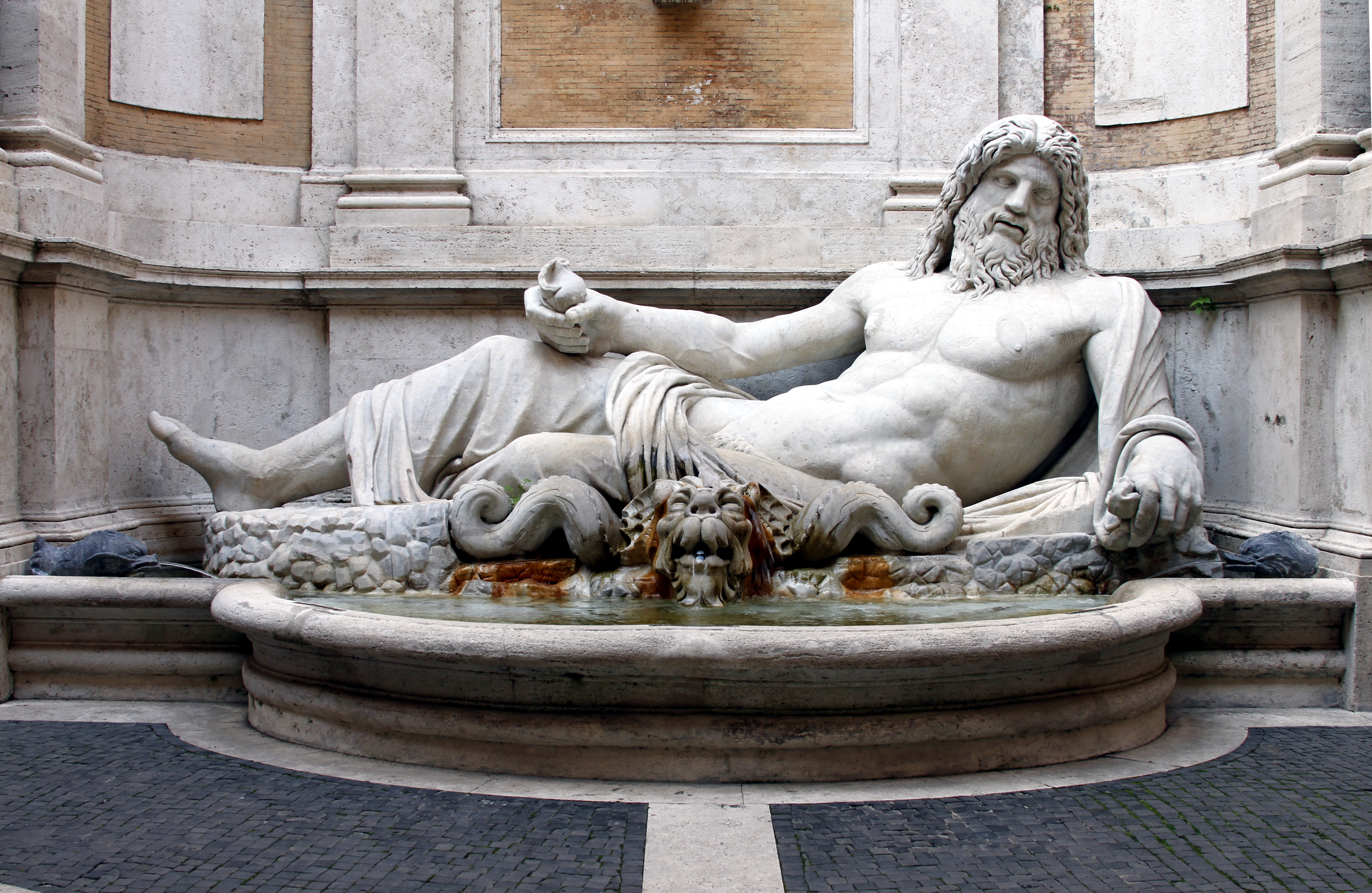
Marforio, one of the talking statues of Rome

Culture of Rome

- Culture of ancient Rome
- Cuisine of Rome
  - Ancient Roman cuisine
- Events in Rome
  - Festa della Repubblica
- Language of Rome
- People from Rome

=== Arts in Rome ===
Arts in Rome

- Roman art
  - Ancient Roman pottery
  - Roman portraiture
  - Roman sculpture
  - Roman wall painting (200 BC–AD 79)
  - Rome-themed paintings
    - Ancient Rome
    - Apollo Belvedere
    - Augustus of Prima Porta
    - Ecstasy of Saint Teresa
    - Laocoön and His Sons
    - Modern Rome
      - Pompeian Styles
  - Roman Renaissance
  - Scuola Romana
  - Prix de Rome
  - Rome Quadriennale
  - Rome Prize

==== Architecture of Rome ====
Architecture of Rome

- Ancient Roman architecture
  - Ancient monuments
    - Aqueducts
    - Arches
    - Bridges
    - Catacombs
    - Defensive walls
    - Obelisks
    - Talking statues
    - Theatres
    - Tombs
- Fascist architecture in Rome
  - EUR, Rome (Esposizione Universale Roma) – Construction of the EUR began in 1936 in anticipation for Mussolini's World Fair in 1942 to mark the 20th anniversary of the Italian fascist era
  - Palazzo della Civiltà Italiana – A famous edifice of the EUR
- Tallest buildings in Rome

==== Cinema of Rome ====
Cinema of Rome

- Cinecittà
- Films set in ancient Rome
- Films set in Rome
- Rome Film Festival

==== Music of Rome ====
Music in Rome

- Music of ancient Rome
- Roman School
- Accademia Filarmonica Romana
- Accademia Nazionale di Santa Cecilia
- Parco della Musica
- Teatro dell'Opera di Roma

==== Theatre of Rome ====
Theatre in Rome

- Theatre of ancient Rome
- Theatres and opera houses in Rome

=== Religion in Rome ===
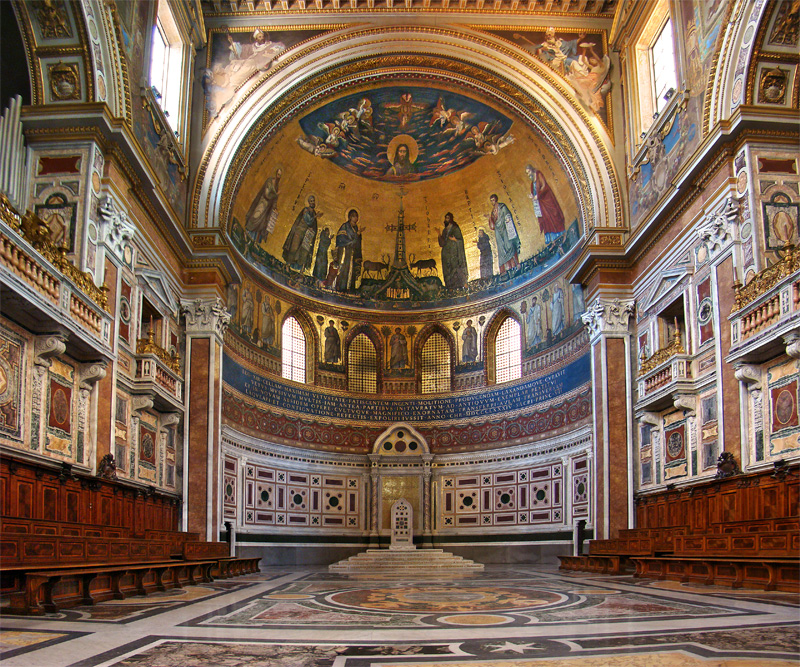
The cathedra of the Pope in the apse of Archbasilica of Saint John Lateran, Rome

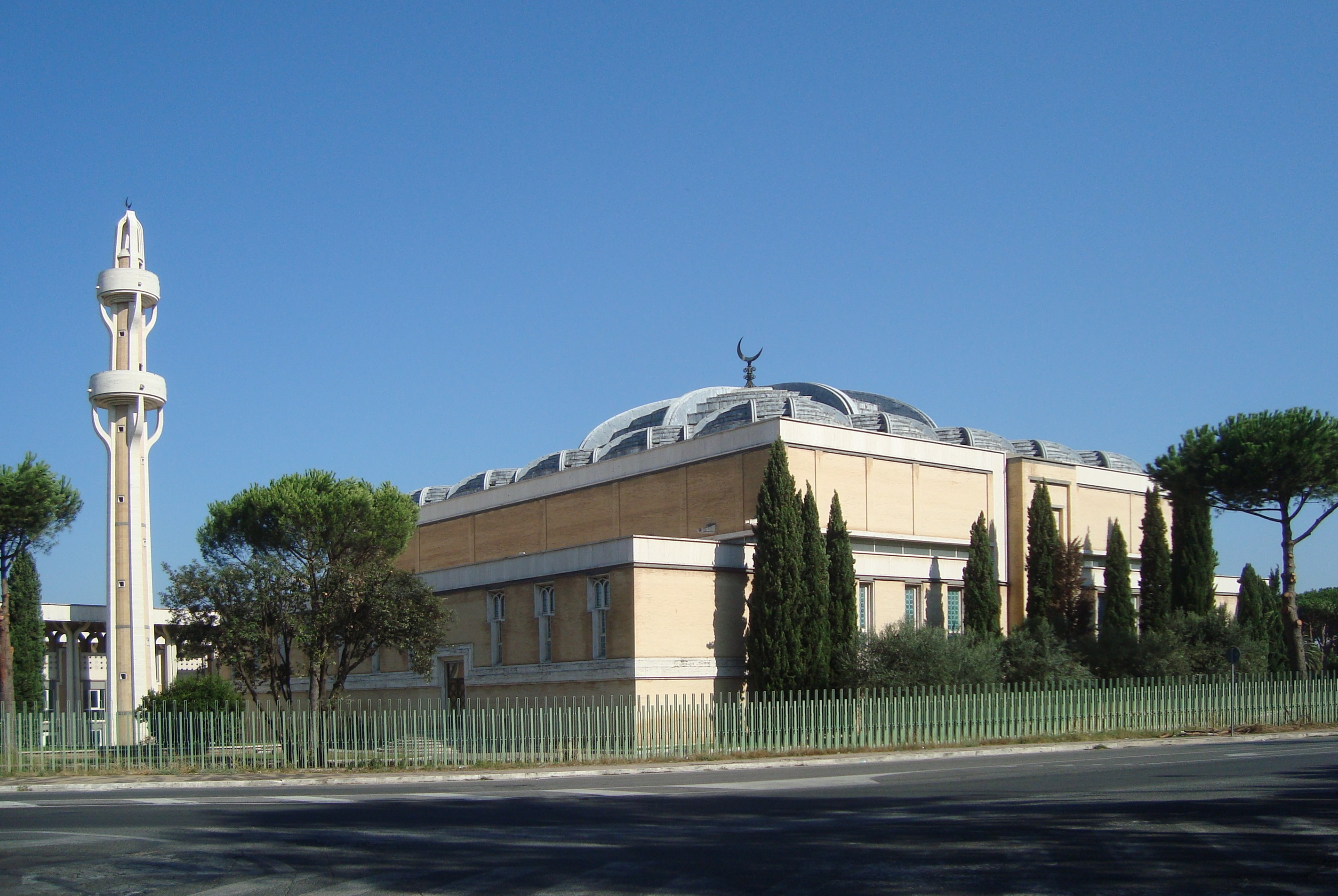
Mosque of Rome, the largest mosque outside the Islamic world

Religion in Rome

- Religion in ancient Rome
- Catholicism in Rome
  - Pope (Bishop of Rome)
    - Primacy of the Bishop of Rome
  - Diocese of Rome
  - National churches in Rome
- Islam in Rome
  - Mosque of Rome
- Roman mythology

==== Churches in Rome ====
- Seven Pilgrim Churches of Rome
- Titular churches in Rome

=== Sports in Rome ===
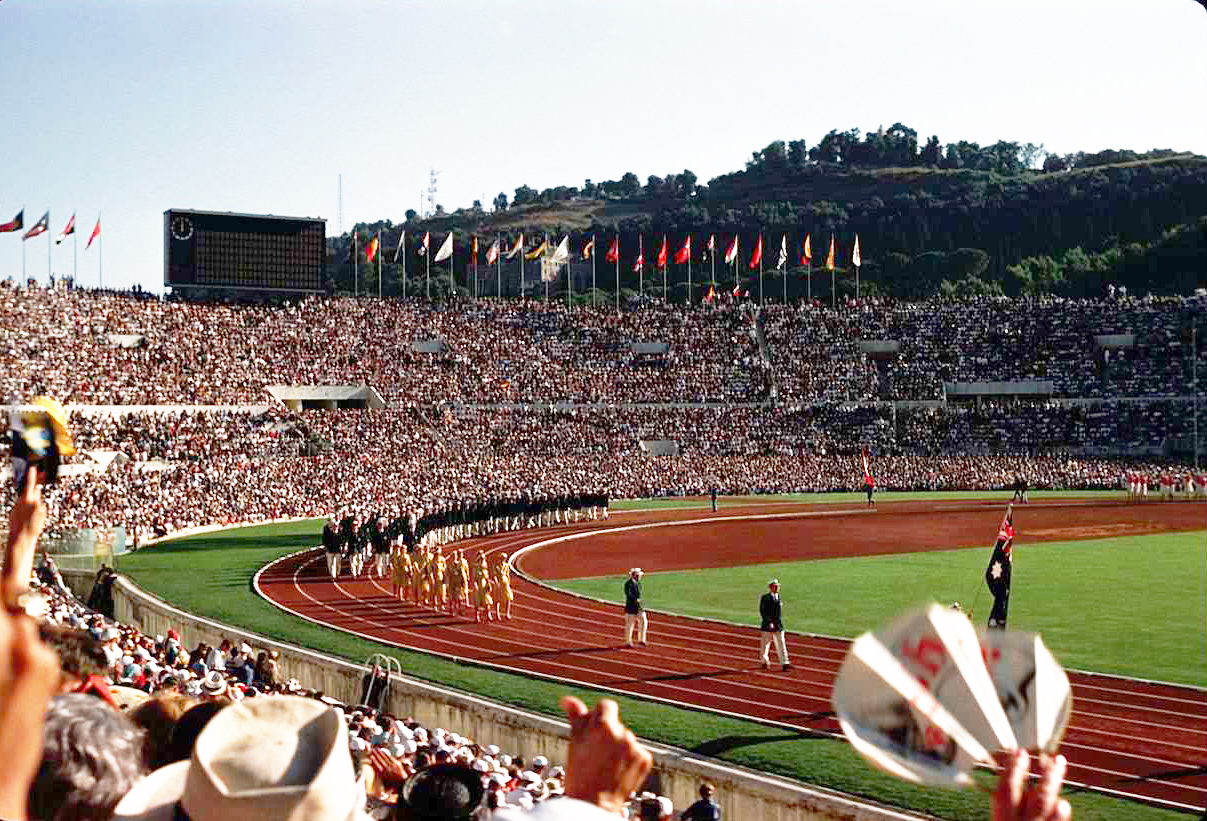
Opening ceremony of the 1960 Summer Olympics in Rome's Stadio Olimpico

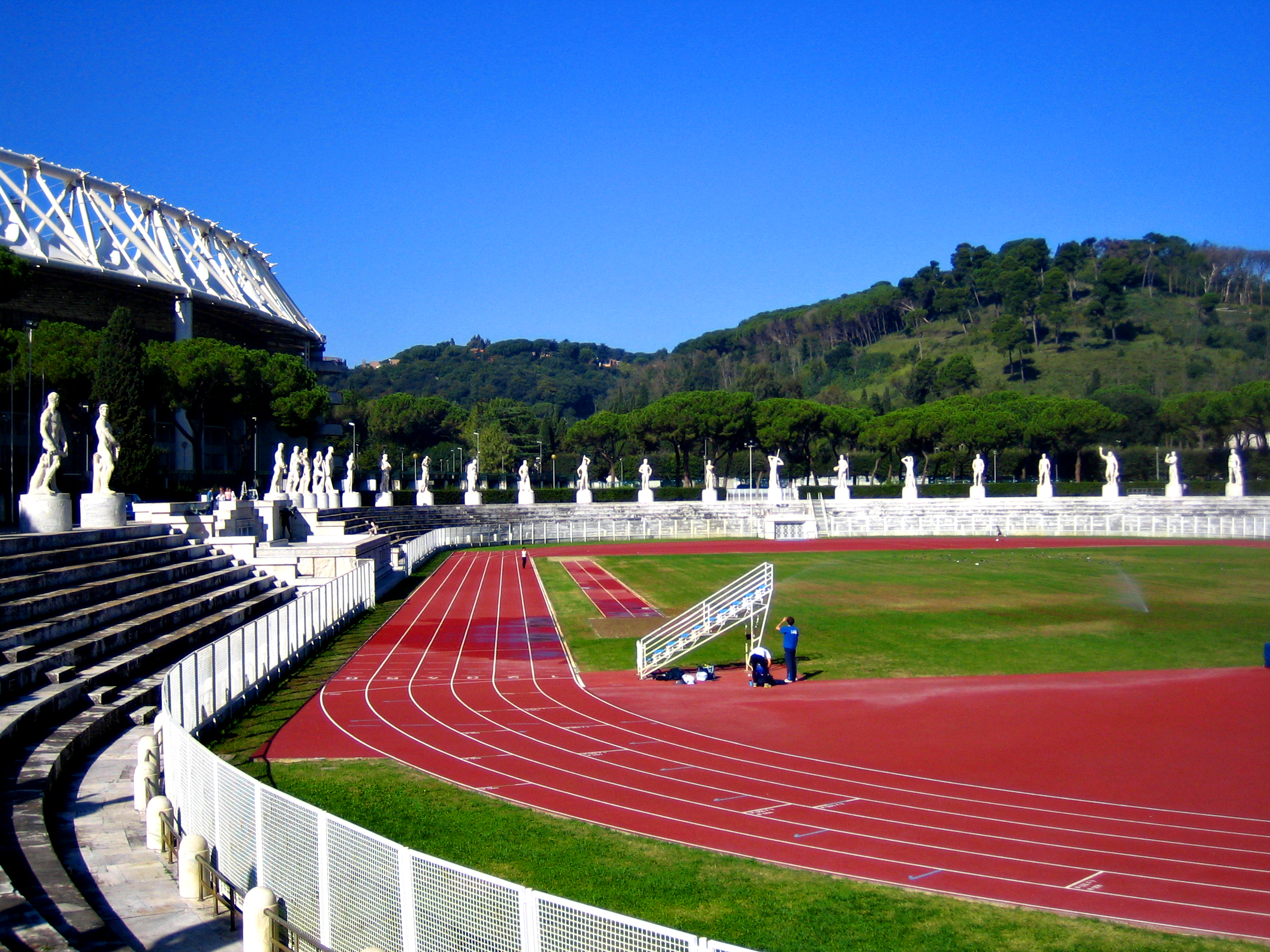
Stadio dei Marmi, a stadium in the Foro Italico sports complex

Sports in Rome

- Basketball in Rome
  - Pallacanestro Virtus Roma
- Football in Rome
  - Association football in Rome
    - Derby della Capitale
      - A.S. Roma
      - S.S. Lazio
  - Rugby football in Rome
    - Italy national rugby union team
    - Unione Rugby Capitolina
    - S.S. Lazio Rugby 1927
- Olympics in Rome
  - 1960 Summer Olympics
  - 1960 Summer Paralympics
- Running in Rome
  - Rome Marathon
- Sports venues in Rome
  - Stadio Flaminio
  - Stadio Olimpico
- Tennis in Rome
  - Garden Open

== Economy and infrastructure of Rome ==
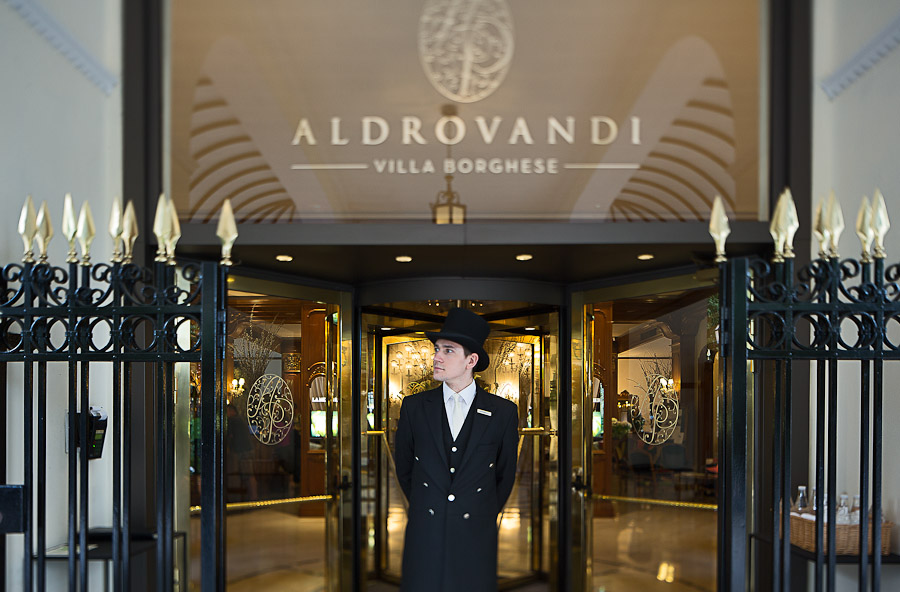
Aldrovandi Villa Borghese, main entrance

The Colosseum, the largest amphitheatre ever built, and a most popular tourist attraction

Economy of Rome

- Communication in Rome
  - Radio stations in Rome
- Fashion industry in Rome
- Hotels in Rome
  - Aldrovandi Villa Borghese
  - Boscolo Exedra Roma
  - Hotel d'Inghilterra
  - The Westin Excelsior Rome
- Restaurants and cafés in Rome
  - Antico Caffè Greco
  - Café de Paris
  - Cencio la Parolaccia
  - Giolitti
  - Harry's Bar
- Tourism in Rome
  - Tourist attractions
  - Shopping areas and markets

=== Transportation in Rome ===
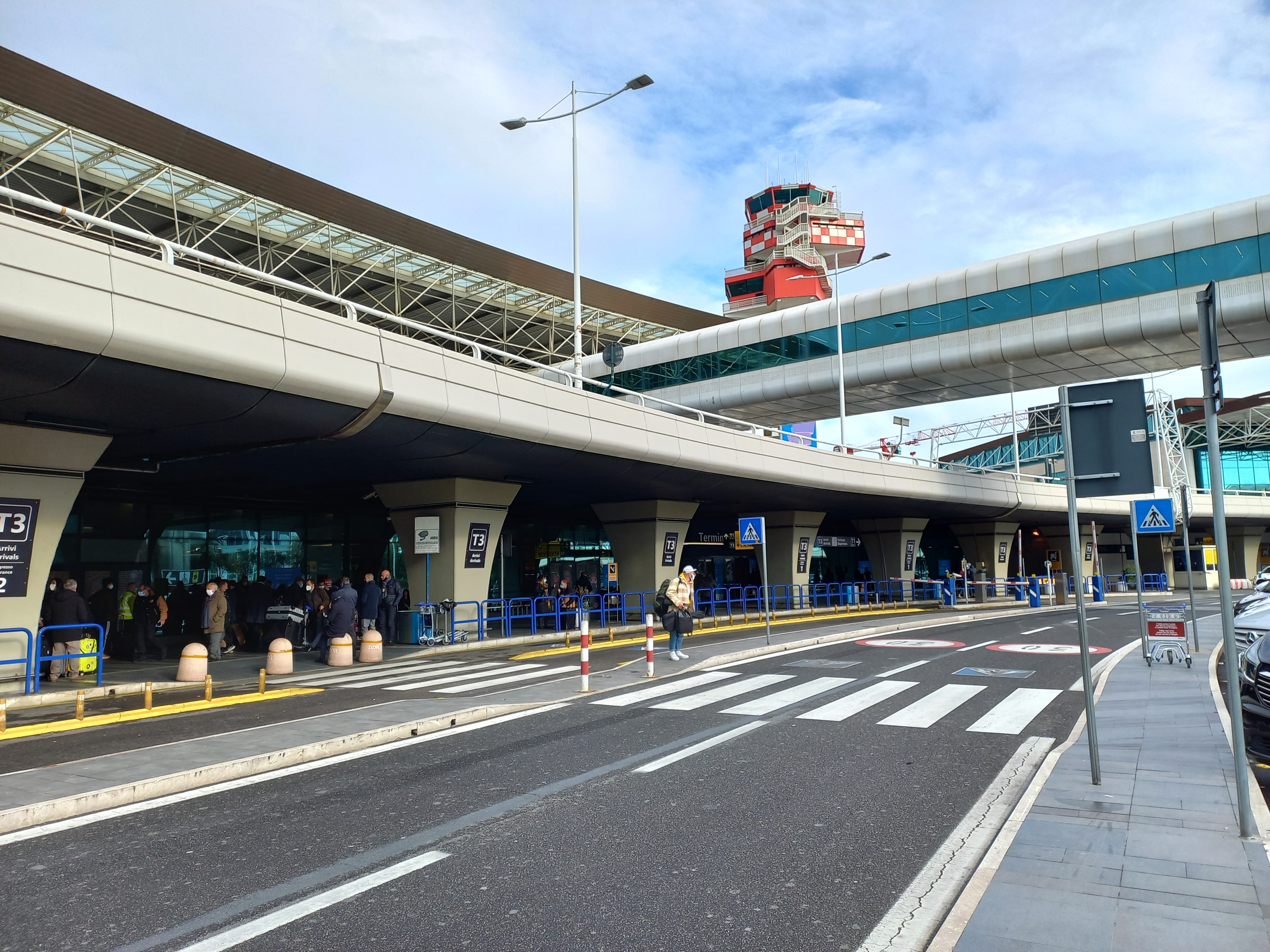
Leonardo da Vinci–Fiumicino Airport, the major airport in Italy

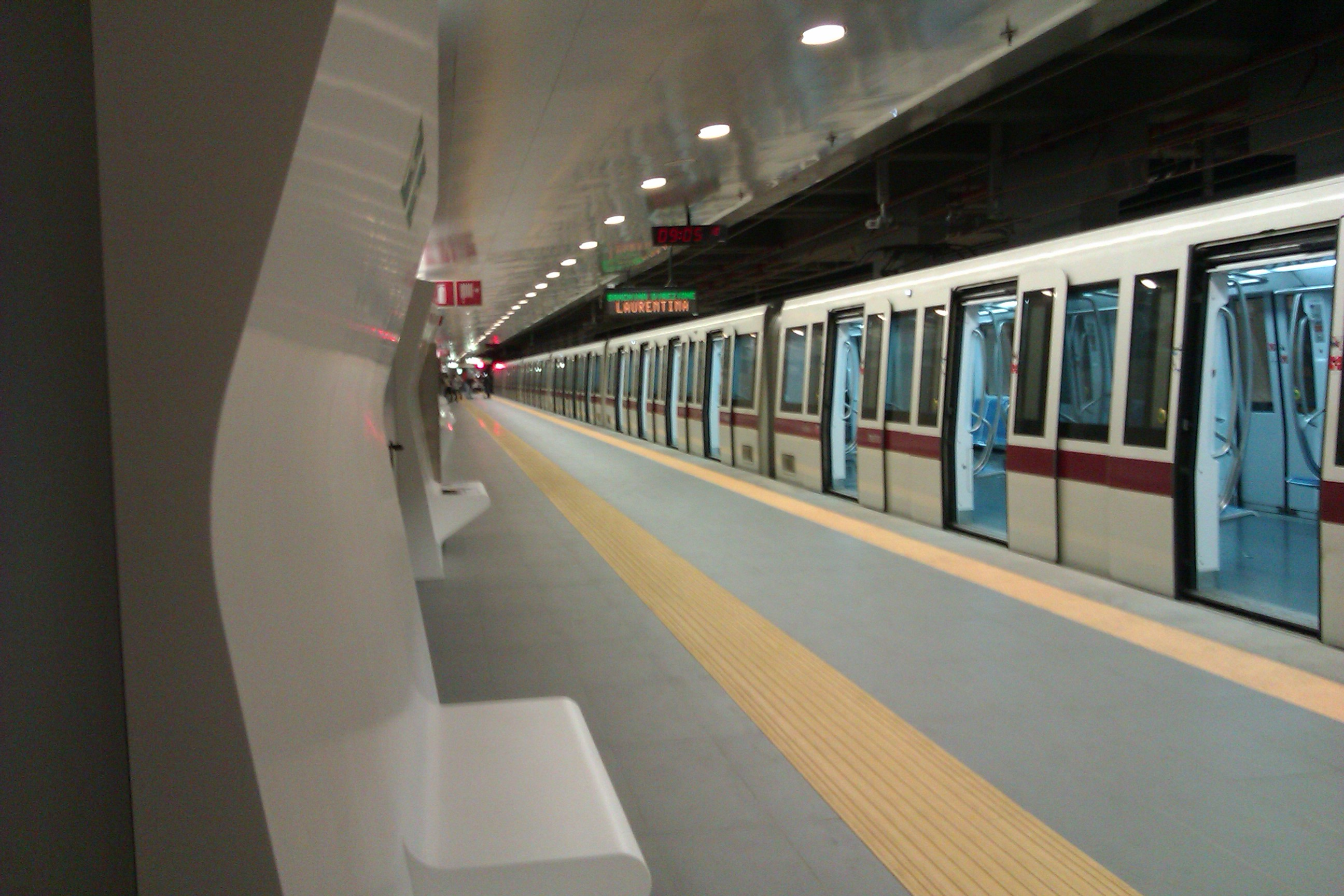
Conca d'Oro, an underground station on Line B of the Rome Metro

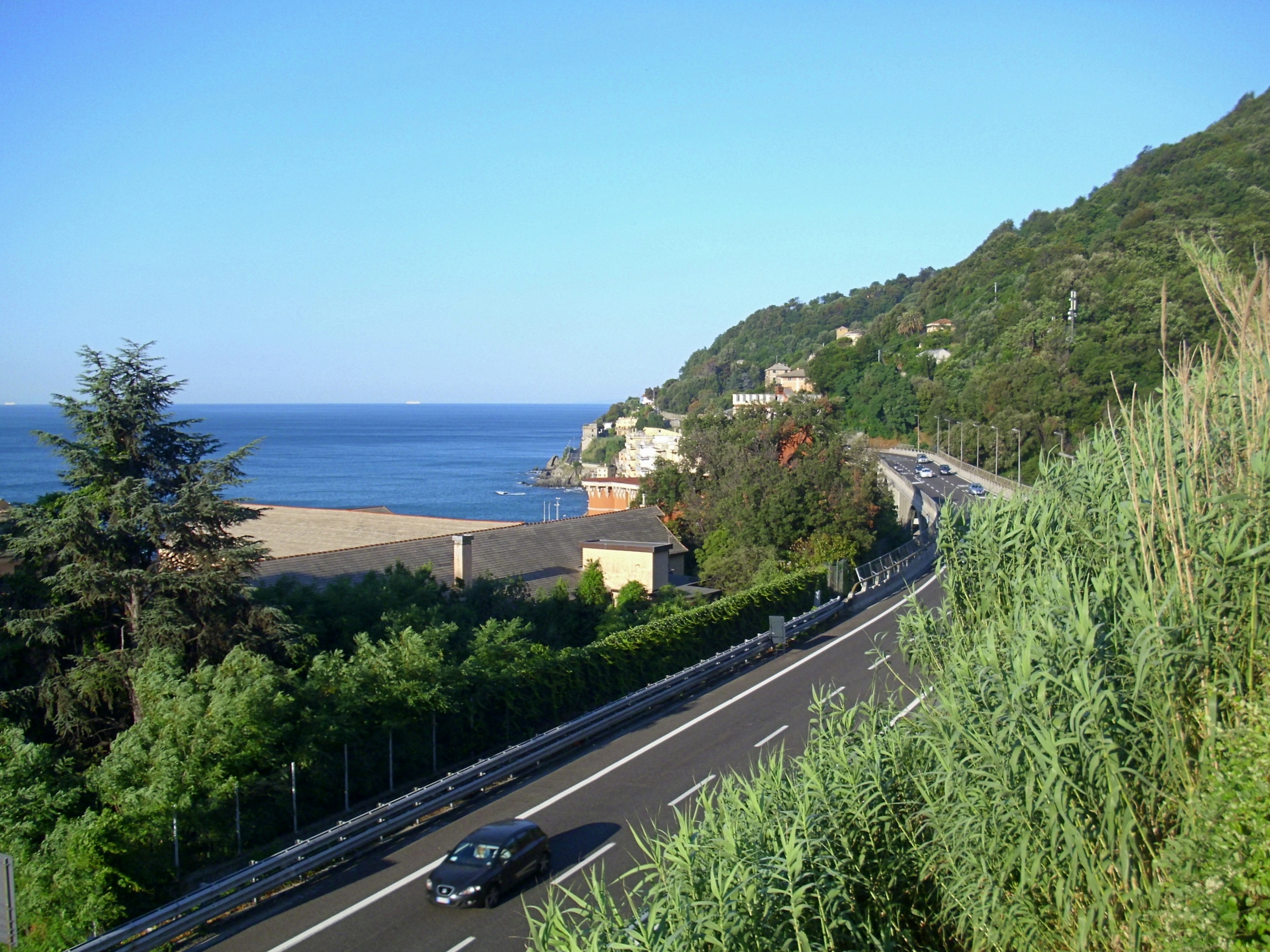
Autostrada A10 along the Ligurian Sea, near Voltri

Transport in Rome

Airports in Rome

- Leonardo da Vinci–Fiumicino Airport
- Rome Ciampino Airport
- Rome Urbe Airport

==== Rail transport in Rome ====
- Commuter rail lines
- Rome–Giardinetti railway
- Rome–Lido railway
- Railway stations in Rome
  - Roma Termini railway station
  - Roma Tiburtina railway station

===== Rome Metro =====
Rome Metro

- List of Rome Metro stations
- Trams in Rome
- Trolleybuses in Rome

==== Road transport in Rome ====
- Roads in Rome
  - Ring road

== Education in Rome ==
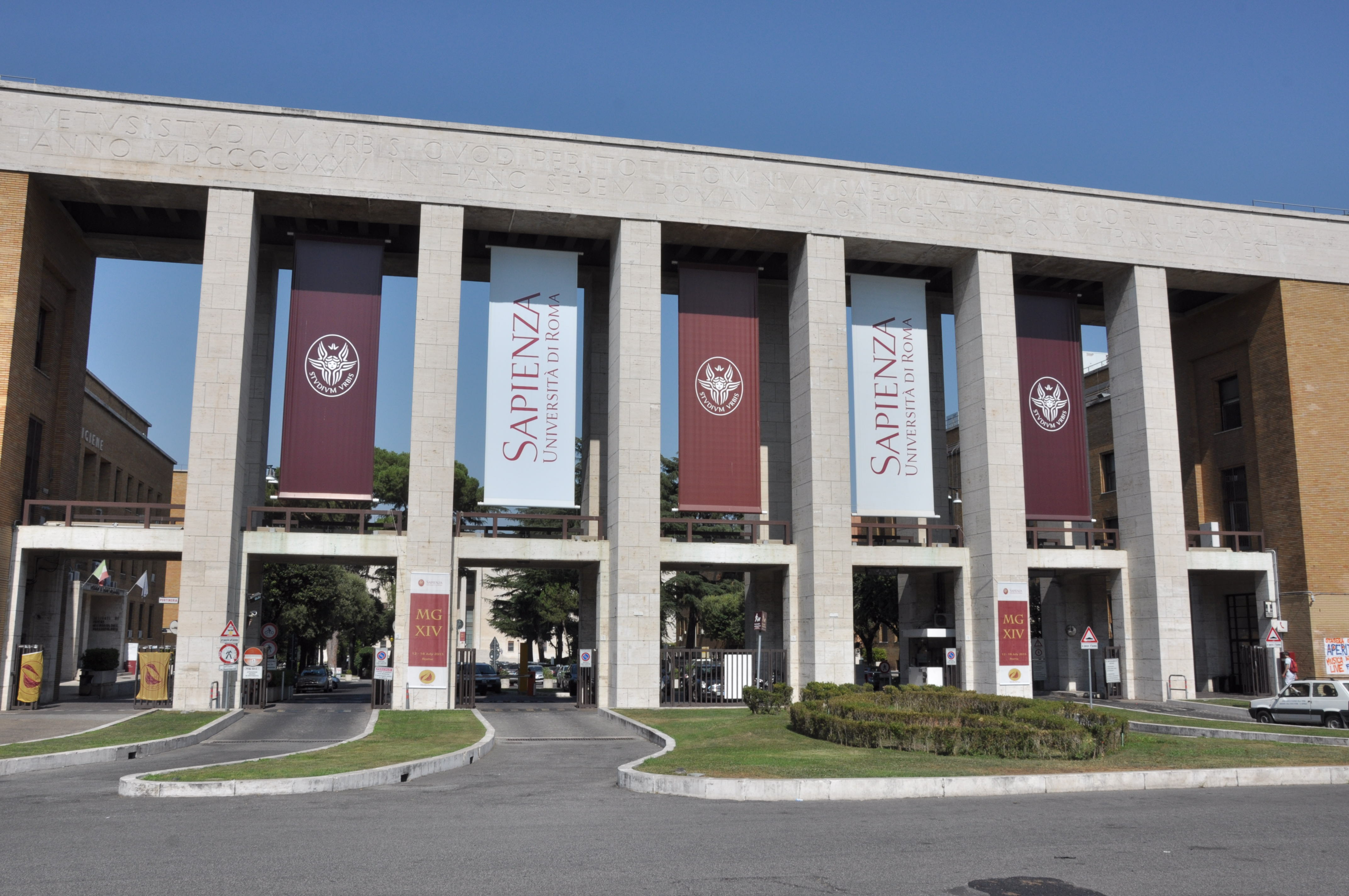
Sapienza University of Rome, one of the oldest in history, founded in 1303

Education in Rome

- Education in ancient Rome
- Italian universities in Rome
  - Sapienza University of Rome – founded in 1303
  - University of Rome Tor Vergata – founded in 1982
  - Roma Tre University – founded in 1992
  - Foro Italico University of Rome – founded in 1998
  - Link Campus University
  - Libera Università Internazionale degli Studi Sociali Guido Carli
  - S. Pio V University of Rome
  - Libera Università Maria SS. Assunta
  - Università Campus Bio-Medico
  - Università degli Studi Niccolò Cusano
  - Marconi University
- Other colleges in Rome
  - American University of Rome
  - John Cabot University
  - John Felice Rome Center
  - Lorenzo de' Medici School
  - Pontifical Croatian College of St. Jerome
  - Pontifical Gregorian University
  - Pontifical North American College
  - St. John's University (Italy)
- Roman Colleges
  - Almo Collegio Capranica
  - Pontifical Ecclesiastical Academy
  - Pontifical Roman Major Seminary

== Healthcare in Rome ==
- Medicine in ancient Rome

Hospitals in Rome

- Fatebenefratelli Hospital
- Policlinico Umberto I
- San Giovanni Addolorata Hospital
- Sant'Eugenio Hospital

== See also ==
- Outline of ancient Rome
- Outline of geography
