= Climate of ancient Rome =

The climate of ancient Rome varied throughout the existence of that civilization. In the first half of the 1st millennium BC, the climate of Italy was more humid and cool than now and the presently arid south saw more precipitation. The northern regions were situated in the temperate climate zone, while the rest of Italy was in the subtropics, having a warm and mild climate. During the annual melt of the mountain snow, even small rivers would overflow, swamping the terrain (Tuscany and the Pontine Marshes were deemed impassable in antiquity). The existence of Roman civilization (including the Eastern Roman Empire) spanned three climatological periods: Early Subatlantic (900 BC–175 AD), Mid-Subatlantic (175–750) and Late Subatlantic (since 750).

The written, archaeological and natural-scientific proxy evidence independently but consistently shows that during the period of the Roman Empire's maximum expansion and final crisis, the climate underwent changes. The Empire's greatest extent under Trajan coincided with the Roman climatic optimum. The climate change occurred at different rates, from apparent near stasis during the early Empire to rapid fluctuations during the late Empire. Still, there is some controversy in the notion of a generally moister period in the Eastern Mediterranean in c. 1 AD–600 AD due to conflicting publications.

== Stable climate ==
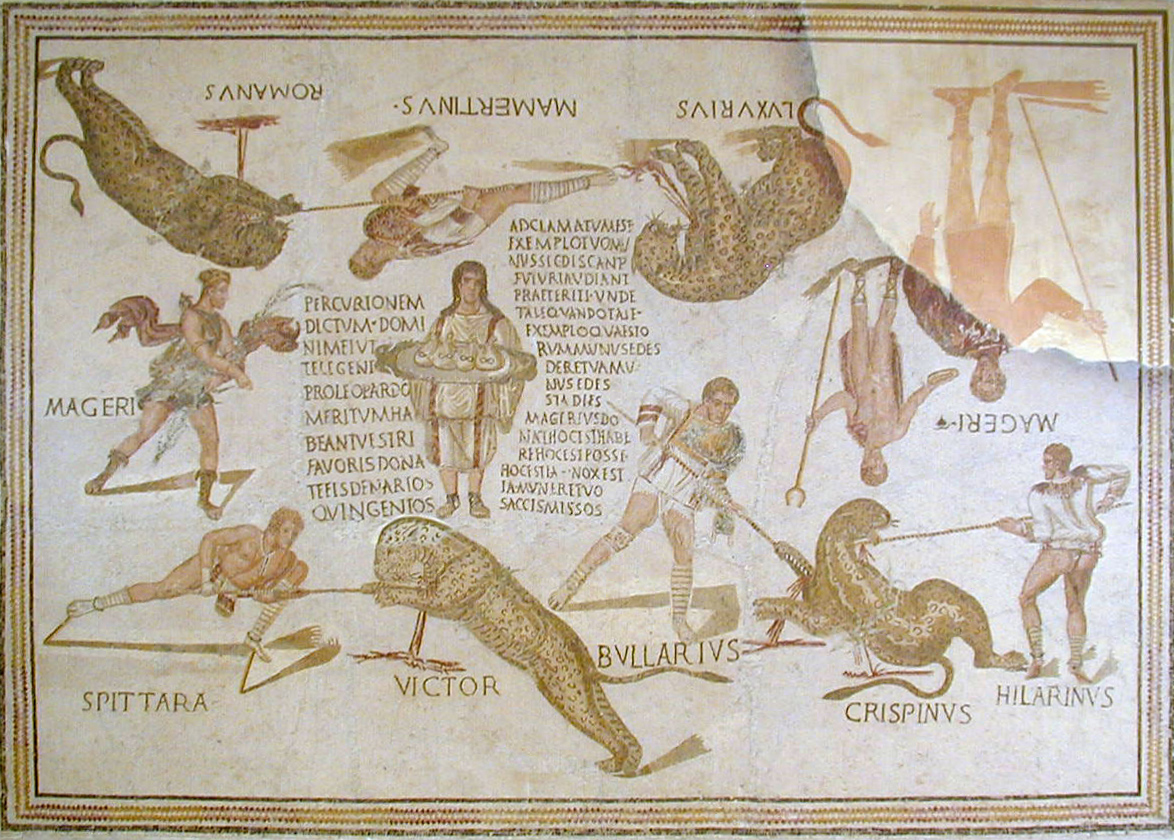
Leopards on the Magerius Mosaic from modern Tunisia. Numerous Roman mosaics from North African sites depict fauna now found only in tropical Africa, although it's unclear whether any climate change contributed to that.

Throughout the entire Roman Kingdom and the Republic there was the so-called Subatlantic period, in which the Greek and Etruscan city-states also developed. It was characterized by cool summers and mild, rainy winters.

At the same time there were a number of drastic winters, including the complete freezing of the Tiber in 398 BC, 396 BC, 271 BC and 177 BC. In subsequent centuries the reports of occasional harsh winters became associated with flooding rather than ice on the Tiber. Evidence for a cooler Mediterranean climate in 600 BC–100 BC comes from remains of ancient harbors at Naples and in the Adriatic which are located about one meter below current water level. Edward Gibbon, citing ancient sources, thought that the Rhine and the Danube were frequently frozen, facilitating the invasion of barbarian armies into the Empire "over a vast and solid bridge of ice". Suggesting colder climate, Gibbon also contended that during Caesar's time reindeer were commonly found in the forests of modern Poland and Germany, whereas in his time reindeer were not observed south of the Baltic.

During the reign of Augustus the climate became warmer and the aridity in North Africa persisted. The biotopes of Heterogaster urticae, which in Roman times occurred farther north than in the 1950s, suggest that in the early Empire mean July temperatures were at least 1 °C above those of the mid-20th-century. Pliny the Younger wrote that wine and olives were cultivated in more northerly parts of Italy than in the previous centuries, as did Saserna in the last century BC (both father and son).

=== Winds ===
A comparison of modern wind roses with the situation in the 1st century AD shows some differences: in that time northern inflows in winter were quite rare. The typical northwest winds which regularly blew in July are presently non-existent. The sea breeze began a month earlier, in April. Vitruvius mentioned moisture-carrying winds blowing from the south or west which could damage books. There is also evidence indicating that in the Roman period the Mediterranean climate was influenced by low frequency fluctuations in sea level pressure over the North Atlantic, called the Centennial North Atlantic Oscillation (CNAO).

=== Precipitation ===
During the First Punic War, the Mediterranean coast saw such powerful storms that the Roman fleet was destroyed twice (in 255 BC and 249 BC). This was followed by drought in Italy in 226 BC, which lasted six months. In December of 170 BC there was a blood rain in Rome. Written sources from about 75 BC to c. 175 AD also emphasize moisture, mainly in the form of the Tiber floods in Rome. Large Tiber floods occurred in 5 (lasted seven days), 15, 36, 51, 69, 79 and 97 AD. Starting from the Roman annexation of Egypt in 30 BC and until 155 AD favorable floods occurred more frequently in the Nile.

The winter of 69/70 AD was the driest known to Tacitus when he wrote his Histories around 100 AD; exactly at the same time the dry season persisted in the Americas. Dry conditions returned during the reign of Hadrian. In Timgad – on Hadrian's visit to that city in 133 rain fell for the first time in five years. Some parts of the empire, however, saw better precipitation. A weather diary, compiled by Ptolemy in Alexandria in around 120, mentioned rain in every month except August and thunder throughout the summer. It helps to explain the agricultural prosperity of Roman Africa (the granary of Rome), and the prosperity of southern Spain in the Roman era. According to Rhoads Murphey, the total yearly grain supply from North Africa to Rome, "estimated as enough to feed about 350,000 people, is by no means impossible to produce for export under present conditions". Columella's weather calendar suggests that summer precipitation in southern Italy, particularly in Rome and Campania, occurred more often than now. Unusually high precipitation levels were in Roman Spain during the so-called Iberian–Roman Humid Period.

Roman Spain experienced three major phases: the most humid interval in 550–190 BC, an arid interval in 190 BC–150 AD and another humid period in 150–350. In 134 BC the army of Scipio Aemilianus in Spain had to march at night due to extreme heat, when some of its horses and mules died of thirst (even though earlier, in 181 BC, heavy spring rains prevented the Celtiberians from relieving the Roman siege of Contrebia). Through the 2nd century AD warm temperatures dominated particularly in the Austrian Alps, punctuated by further cool spells from c. 155 to 180. After about 200 the temperatures fluctuated, trending toward cool.

== Environmental issues and climate change ==
According to Sheldon Judson, in the 2nd century BC the rate of soil erosion in Latium increased ten times, which is associated with the increased number of settlements in south Etruria. Additionally, from the foundation of Rome until possibly 165 AD, the Romans deforested huge areas for arable land. In 61 AD Seneca the Younger described the high level of air pollution in Rome, which was associated with the extensive wood burning for fuel.

From c. 200 to c. 290 there was a period of cooling, which affected the northwestern provinces of the Empire. Dendrochronology indicates that severe drought which began in 338 and persisted until 377 forced the nomadic pastoral federation of Huns to seek pastures and predation farther to the west and south. Their attacks north of the Black Sea drove the Goths to flee into the Roman Empire and ultimately to attack it (particularly in the Battle of Adrianople). Increased climate variability from c. 250 to 600 coincided with the decline of the Western Roman Empire. For the Eastern Roman Empire there is evidence for a regional prolonged drought in modern central Turkey in c. 400–540 AD.

== See also ==
- Roman Warm Period
- Extreme weather events of 535–536
- Climate of Rome
