= State Forestry Corps =

Former Italian police agency

State Forestry Corps Corpo Forestale dello Stato
- Abbreviation: CFS
- Motto: Pro natura opus et vigilantia

Agency overview
- Formed: October 15, 1822
- Dissolved: December 31, 2016
- Superseding agency: Ministry of Agriculture, Food Sovereignty and Forests
- Employees: 8,500

Jurisdictional structure
- Operations jurisdiction: Italy

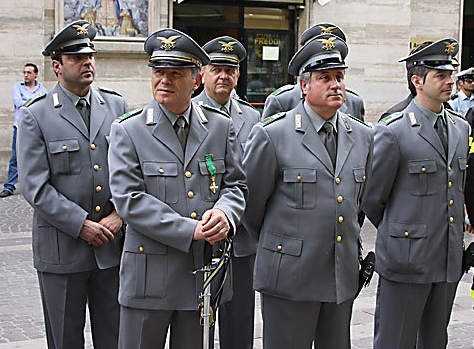
Officers of the State Forestry Corps.

The State Forestry Corps (Italian: Corpo forestale dello Stato or CFS) was a national police agency in Italy. It was established on 15 October 1822 by Charles Felix of Sardinia as Amministrazione forestale per la custodia e la vigilanza dei boschi. The five Italian autonomous regions have their own corps of forestry police under regional or provincial control (Corpo forestale regionale/provinciale), which have not been disbanded. CFS was dissolved on December 31, 2016, and all personnel became militarized and absorbed by the Carabinieri Command of the Forest, Environmental and Agri-food units.

== Mission ==
The CFS had police powers and acted as a park ranger force responsible for protecting Italy's natural resources, the environment, countryside and ecosystems, especially national parks and national forests. It also acted as a criminal investigative department and as a typical police force. Its specialist duties included arresting poachers, investigating environmental violations, illegal building, counterfeit foods, safeguarding protected animal species, enforcing endangered species laws, and preventing and fighting wildfires through 15 regional commands and its fleet of 22 fire-fighting aircraft. It had responsibility for managing activities related to the Convention on International Trade in Endangered Species in Italy.

== Organization ==
The CFS was an agency under the jurisdiction of the Ministry of Agriculture, Food and Forestry. It was part of the Direzione Investigativa Antimafia (DIA) (Anti-Mafia Investigation Department). The CFS was also responsible for civil protection in Italy's mountain areas and for disaster relief. If necessary, the CFS could also be used in tasks of public order in the city and any urban context.

== Regional Corps ==
The autonomous forestry corps of the special statute regions have not been suppressed and are active in Sicily, Sardinia, Val d'Aosta, Friuli Venezia Giulia and Trentino Alto Adige/Südtirol.

== Corporate profile ==
The CFS's emergency telephone number for reporting forest fires was 1515. The CFS's vehicle livery was green with a white stripe and the words Corpo Forestale dello Stato in white along the side. The vehicle plates began with the letters "CFS" in red.

== Rank insignia ==
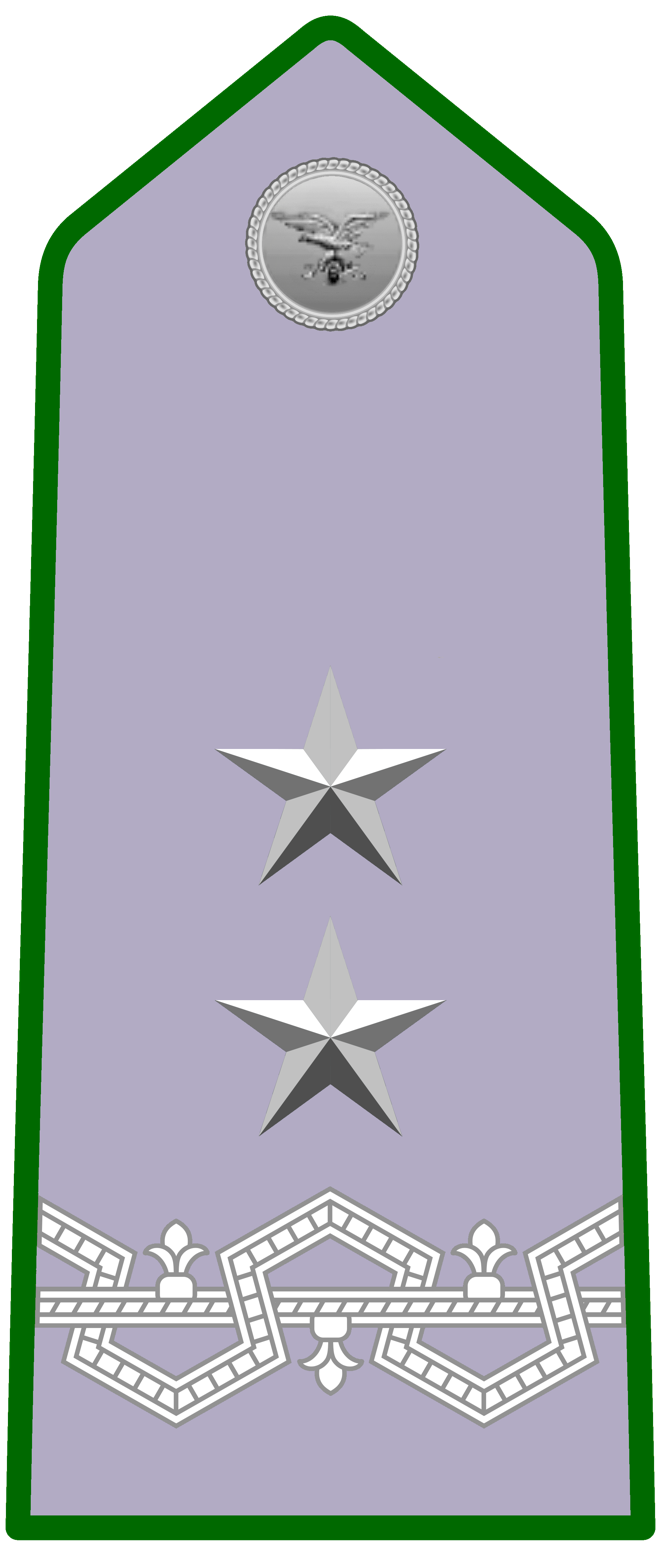
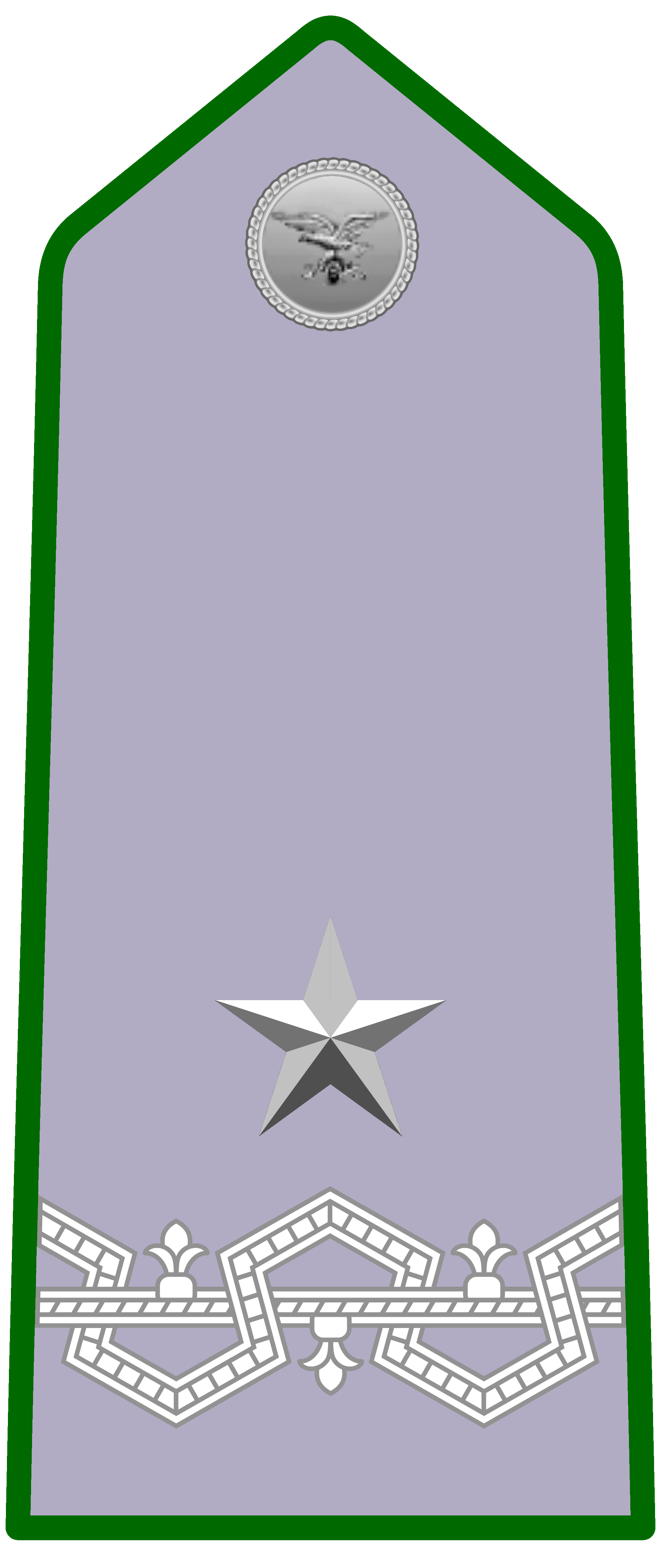
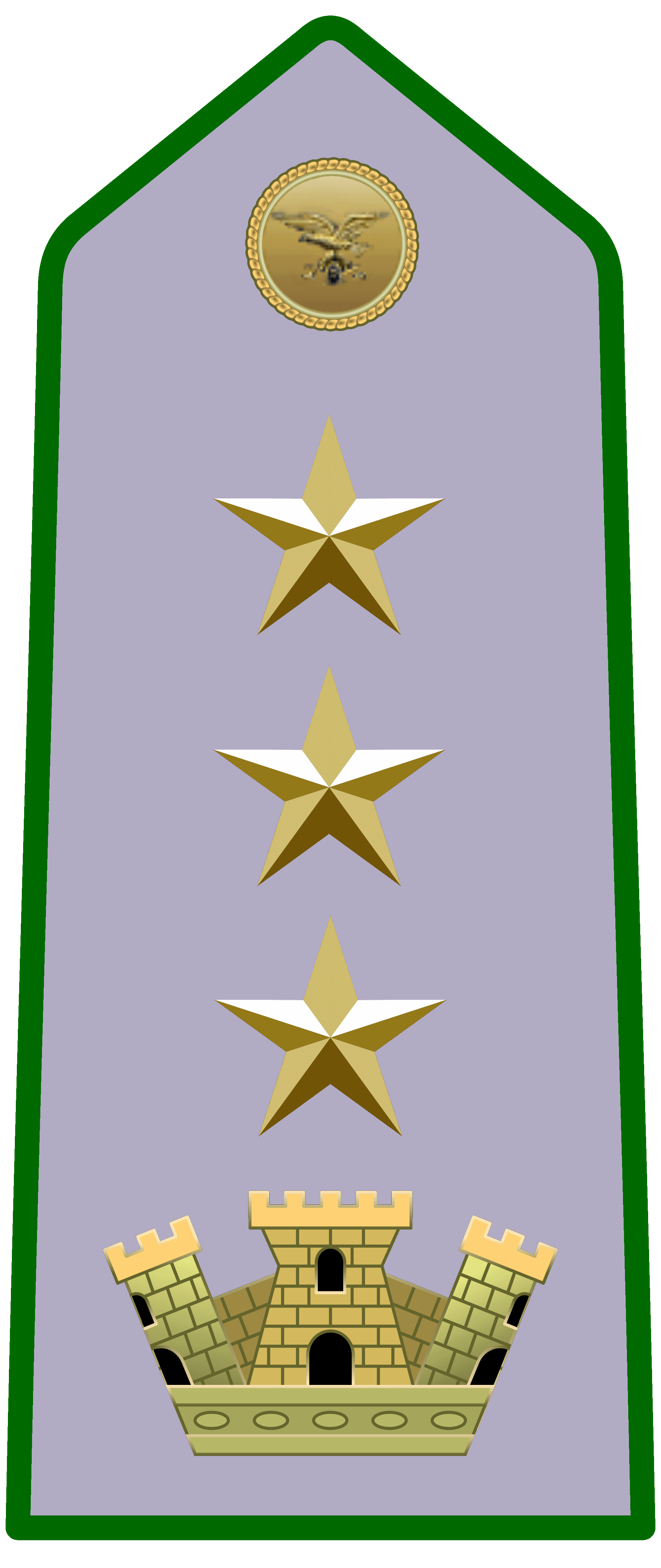
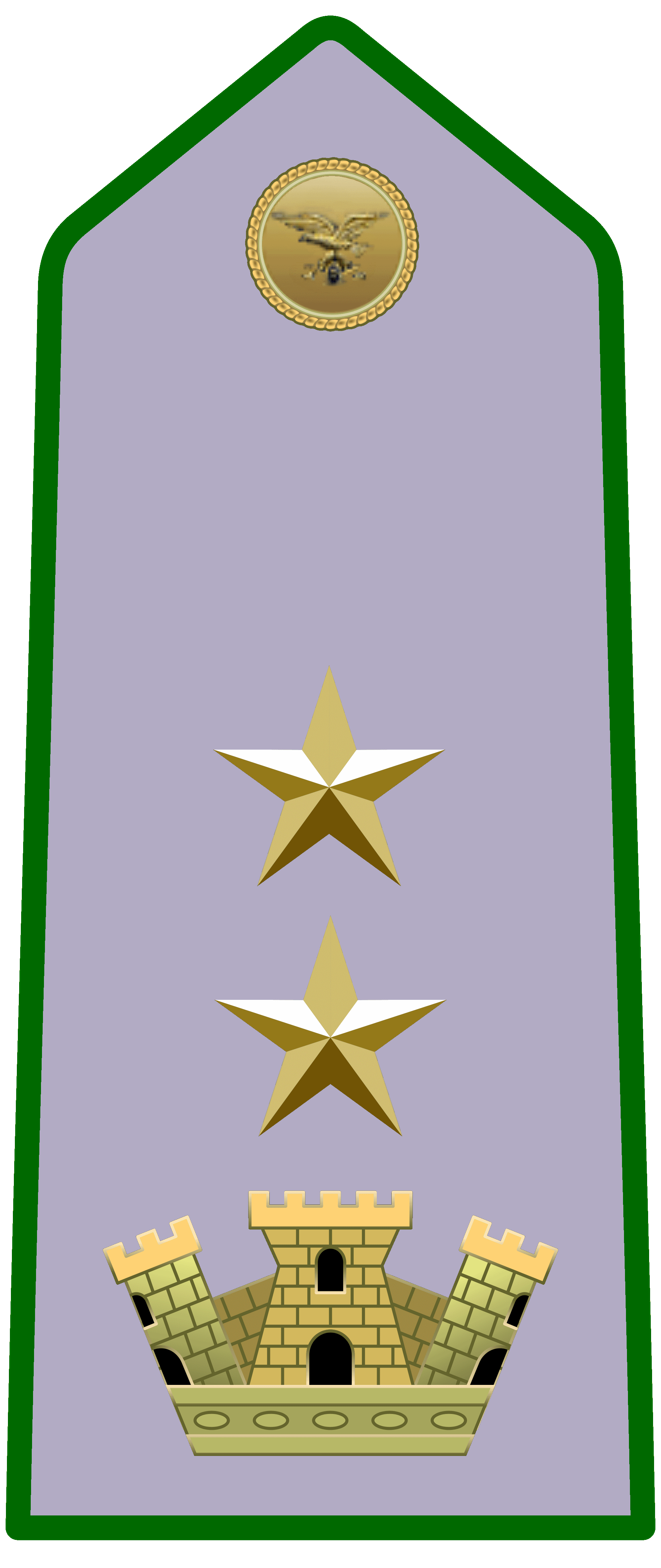
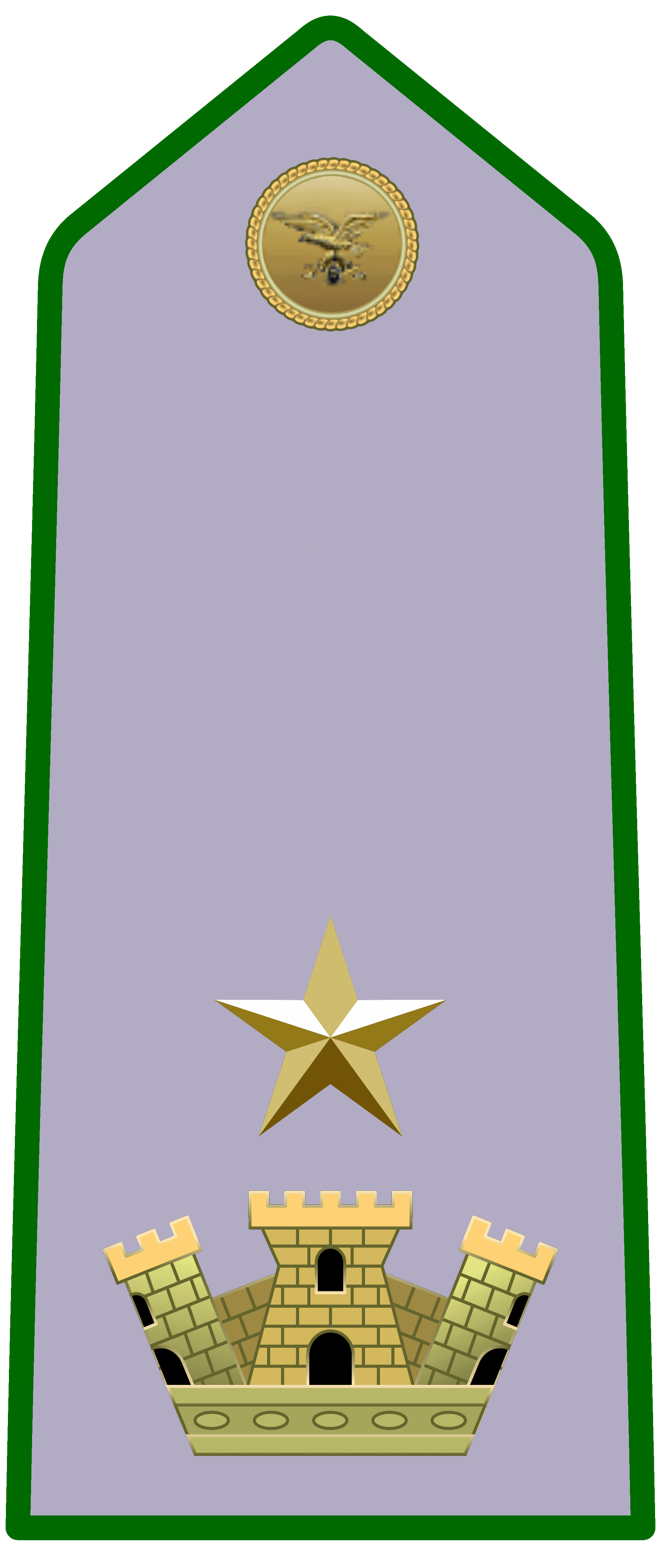
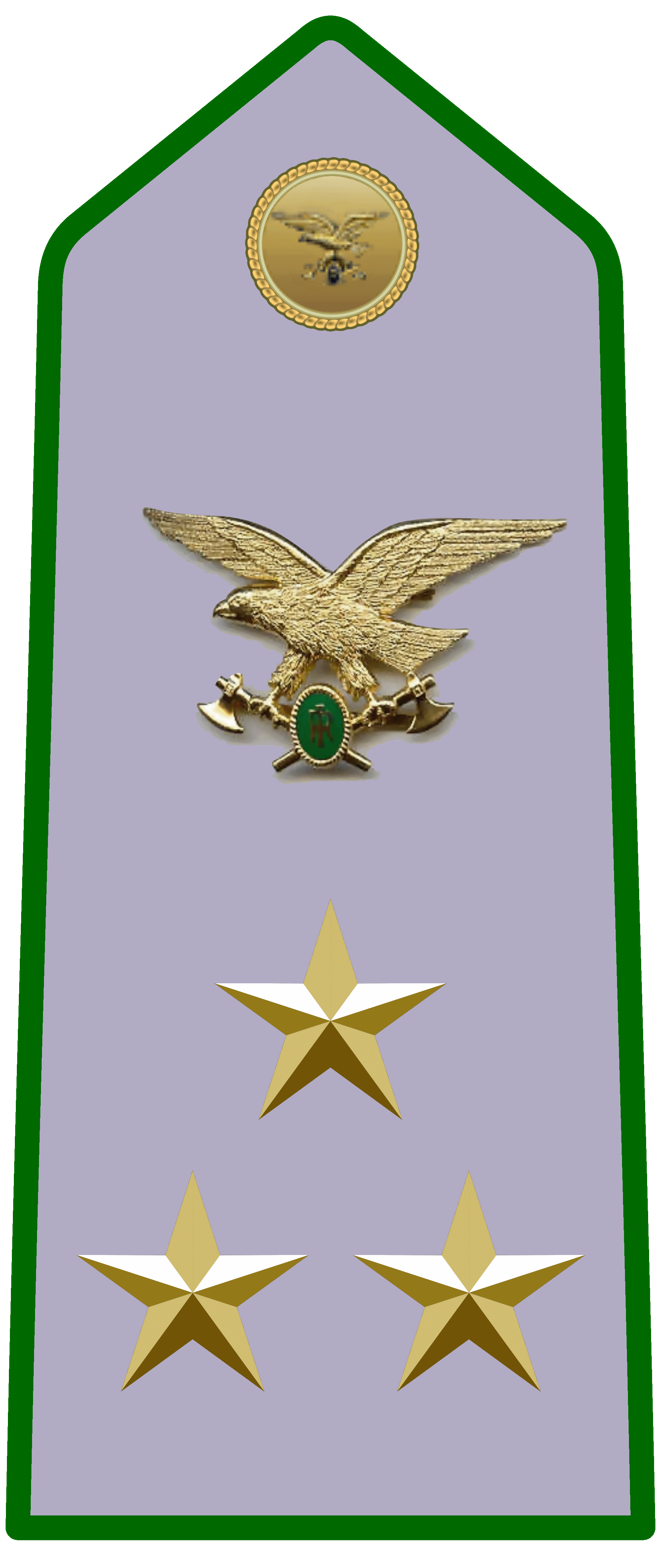
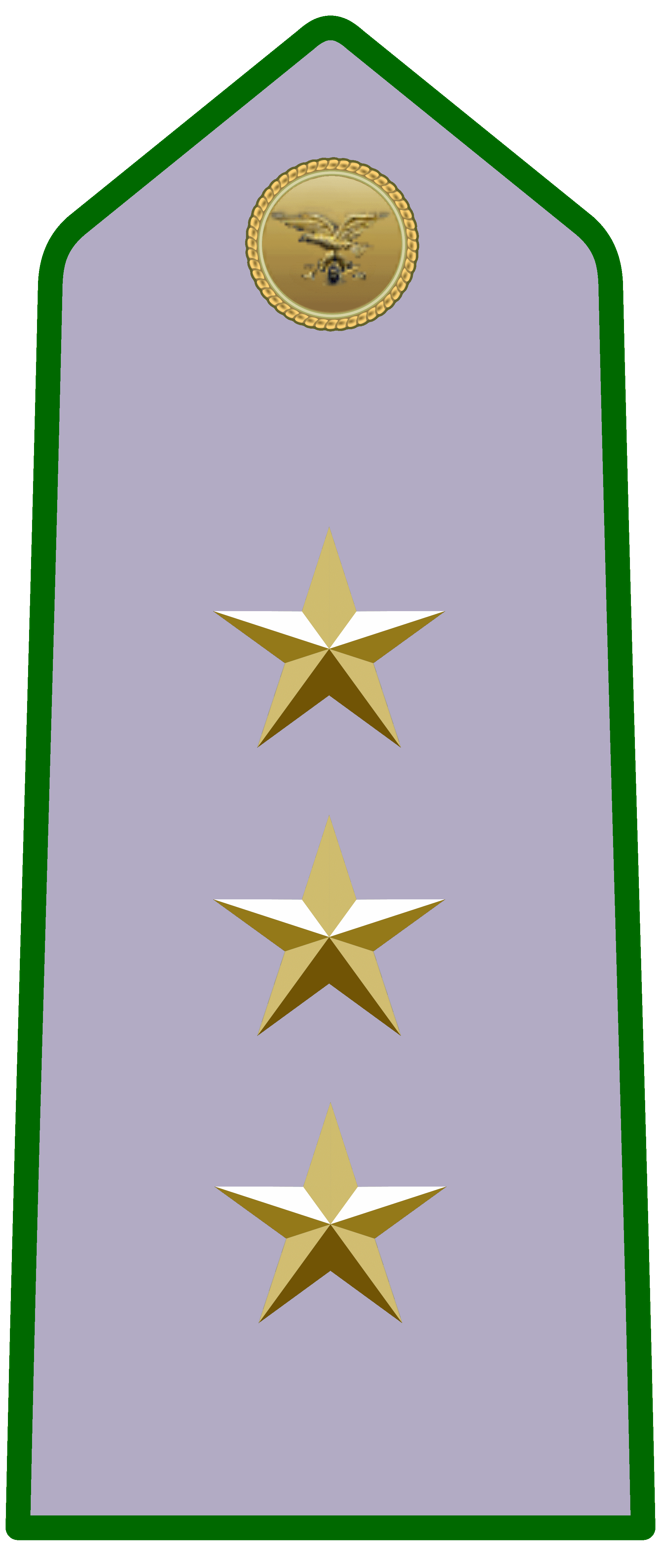
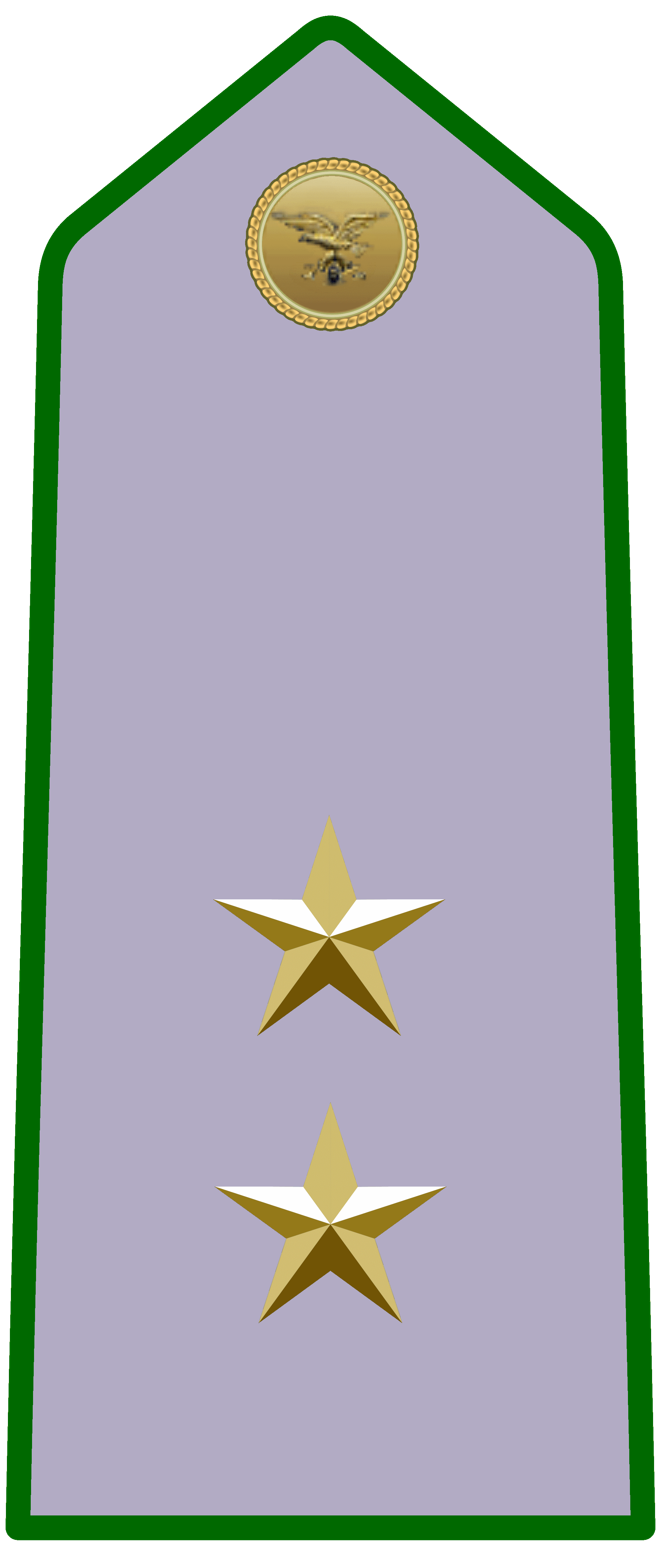
NATO code	OF-10	OF-9	OF-8	OF-7	OF-6	OF-5	OF-4	OF-3	OF-2		OF-1
Corpo forestale dello Stato
Corpo forestale dello Stato				Dirigente generale	Dirigente superiore	Primo dirigente	Vice questore aggiunto forestale	Commissario capo forestale	Commissario forestale (direct entry trainee)	Commissario forestale (internal recruitment trainee)	Vice commissario (internal recruitment trainee)

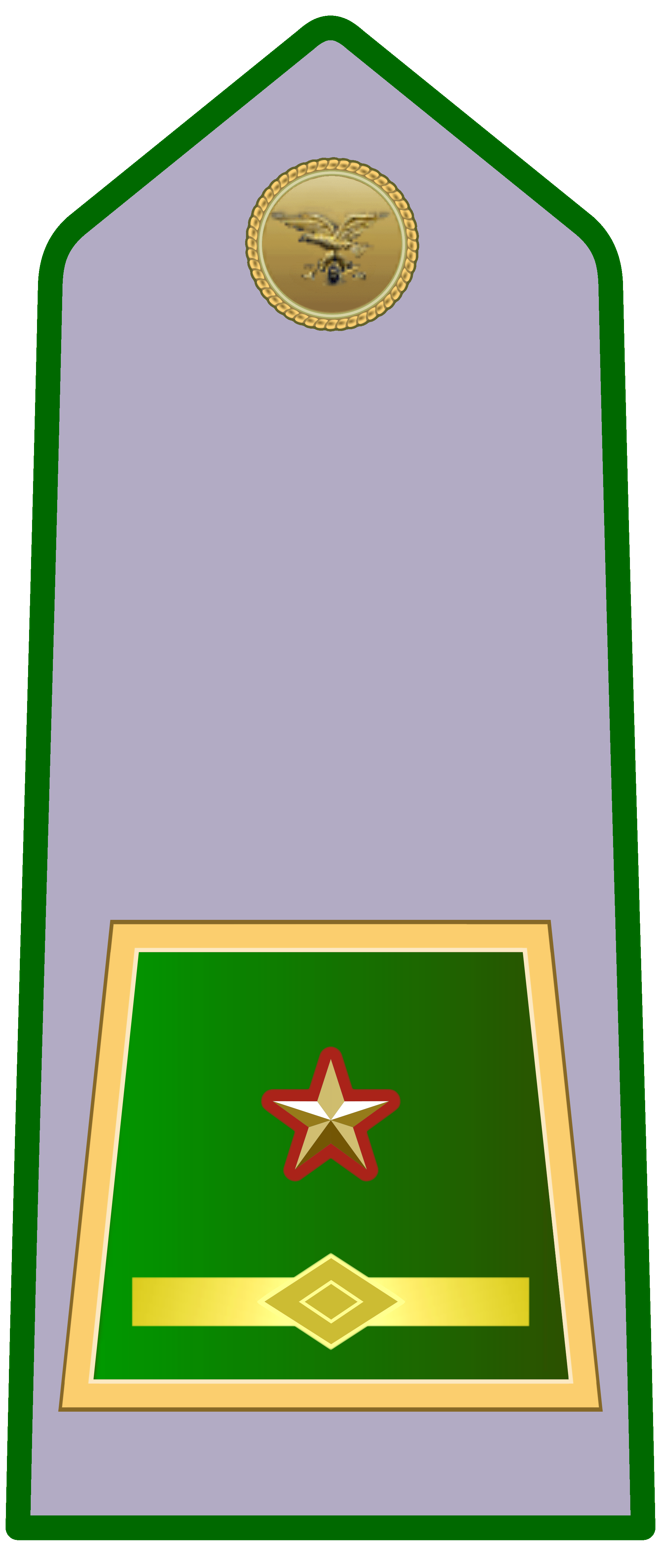
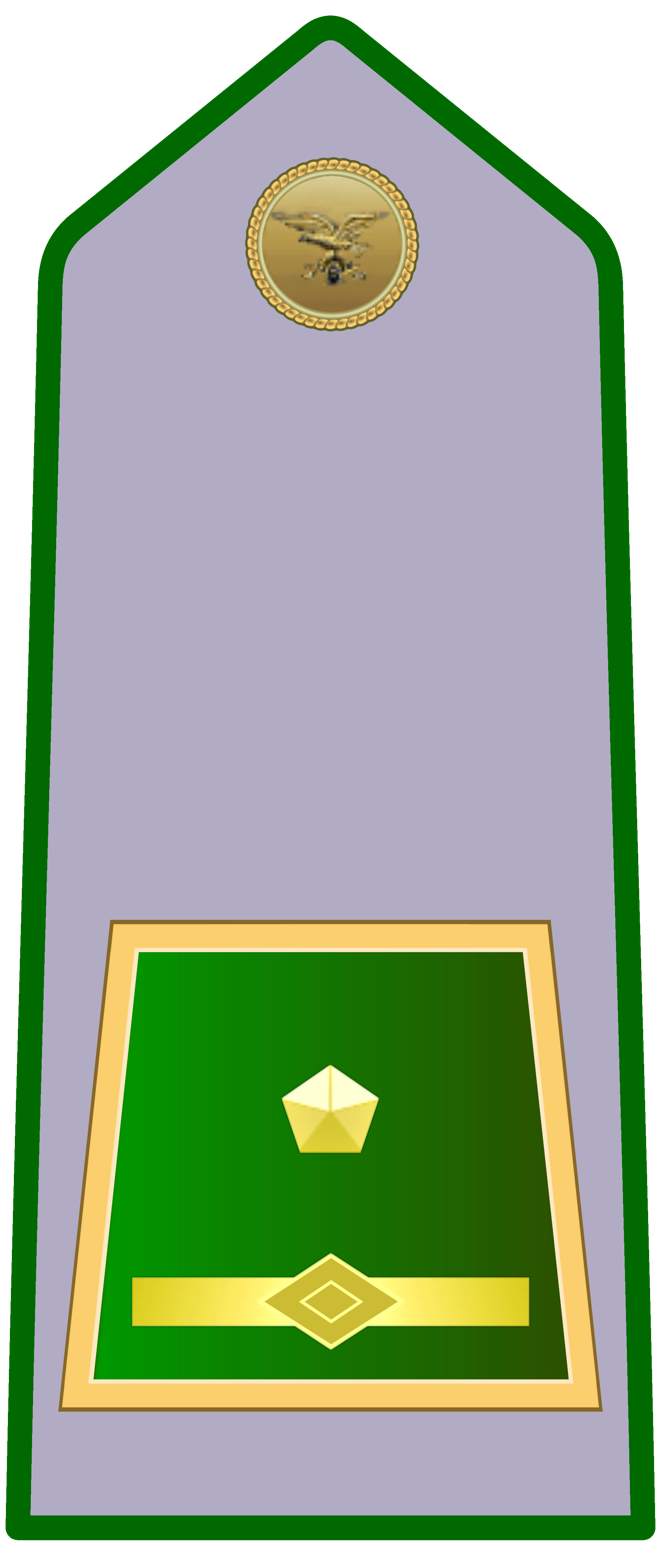
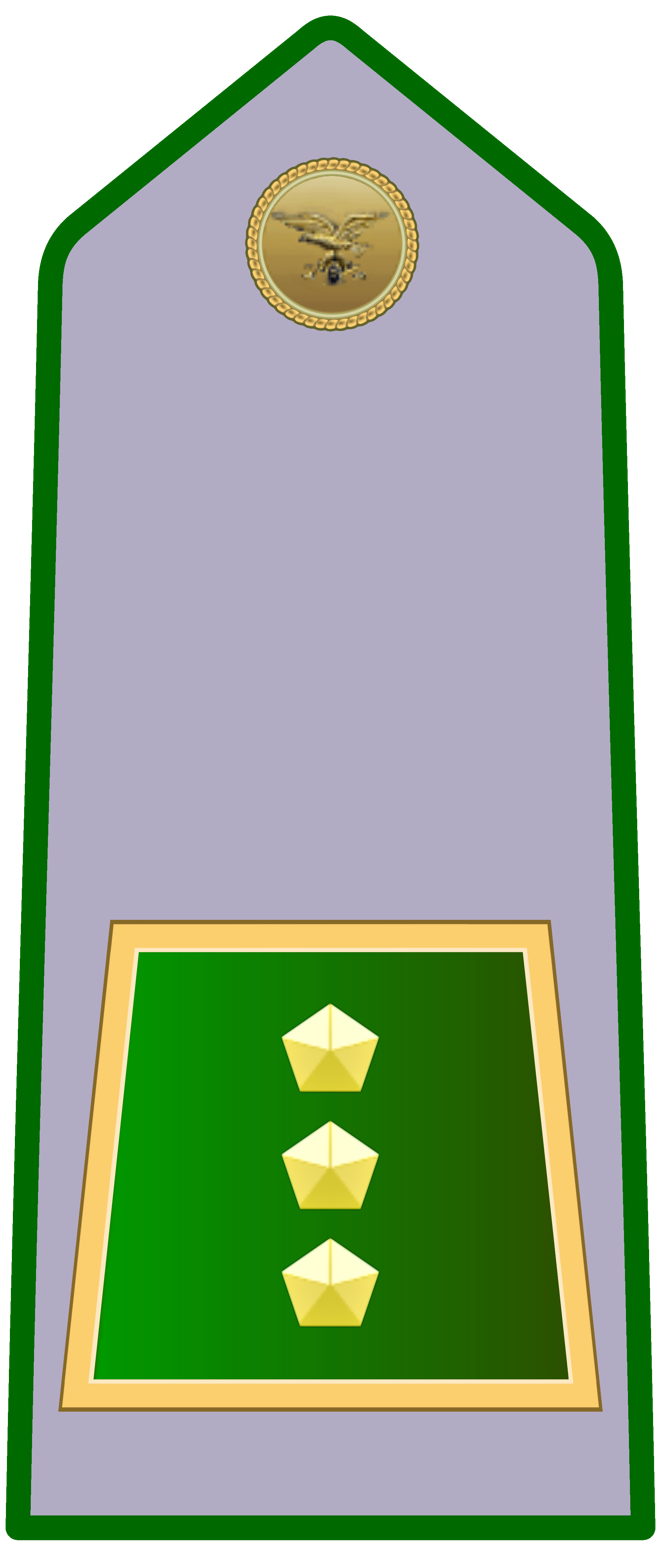
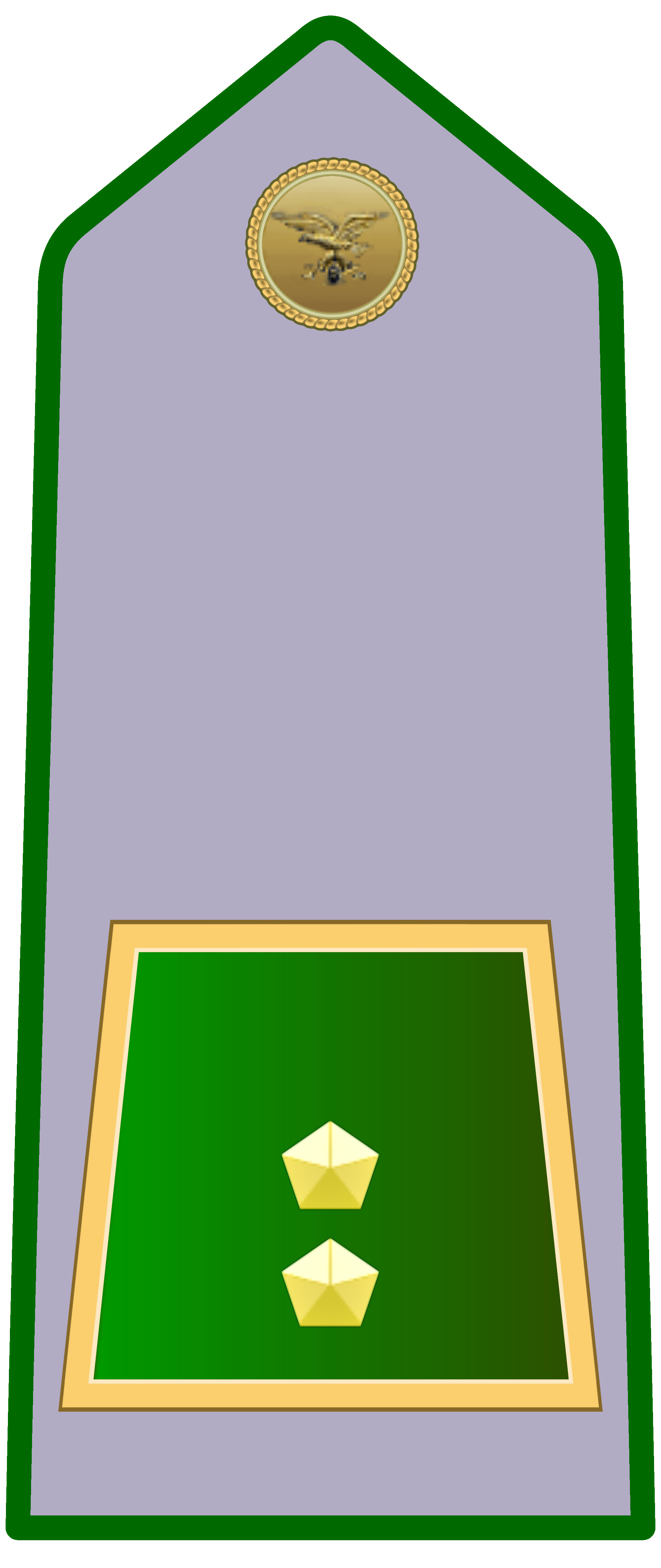
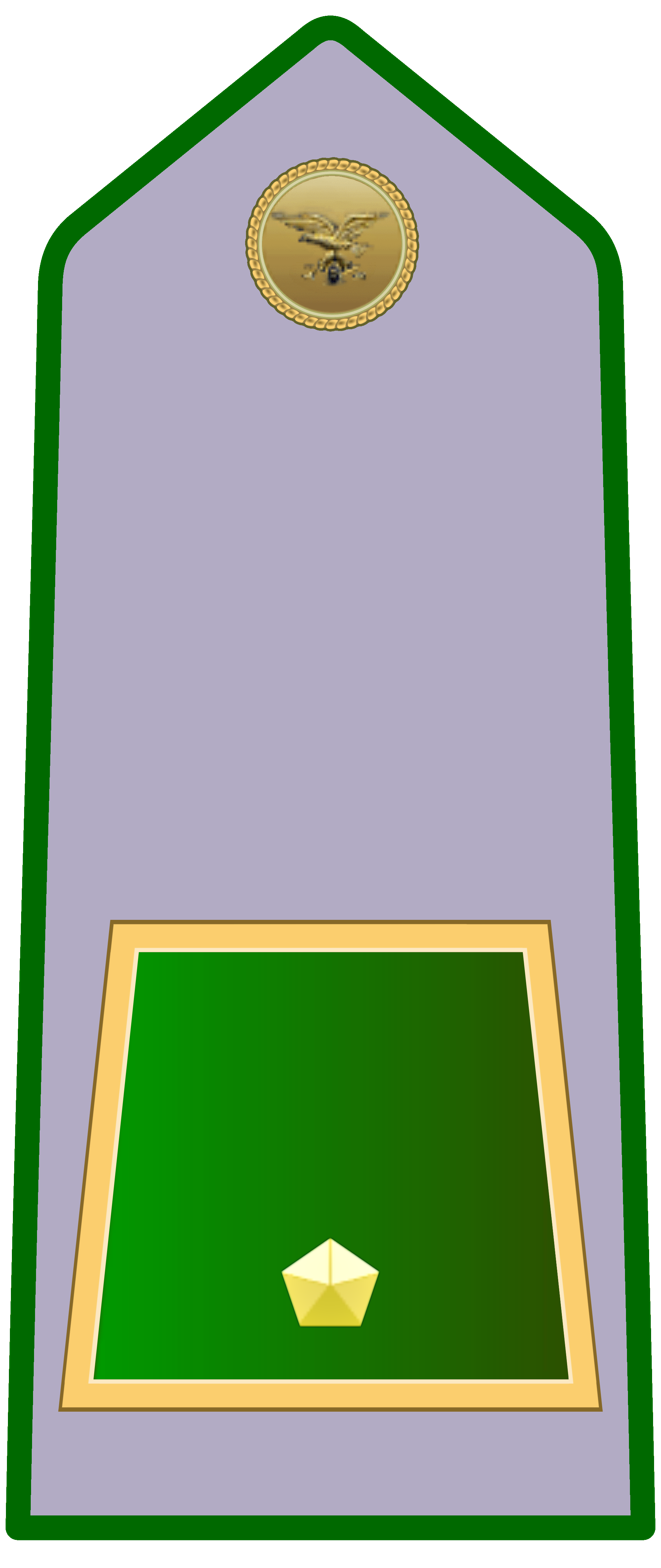
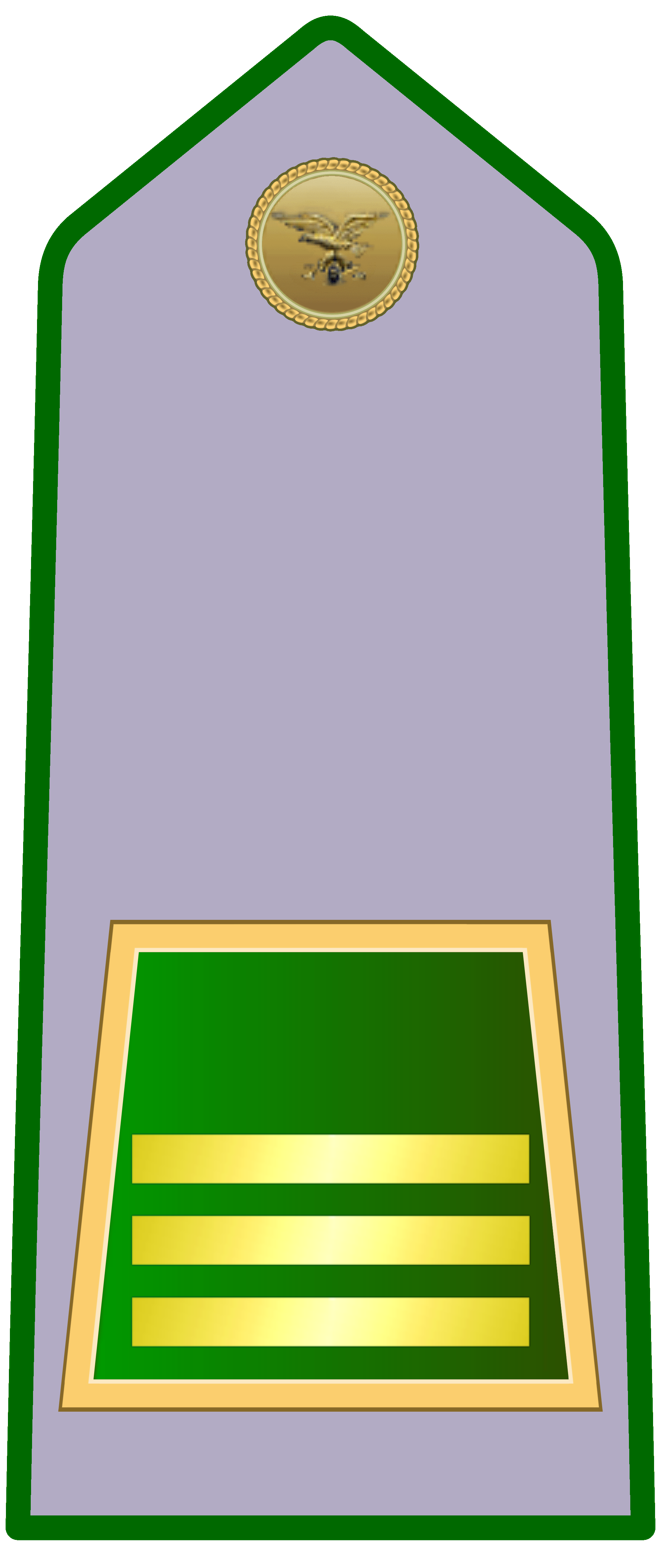
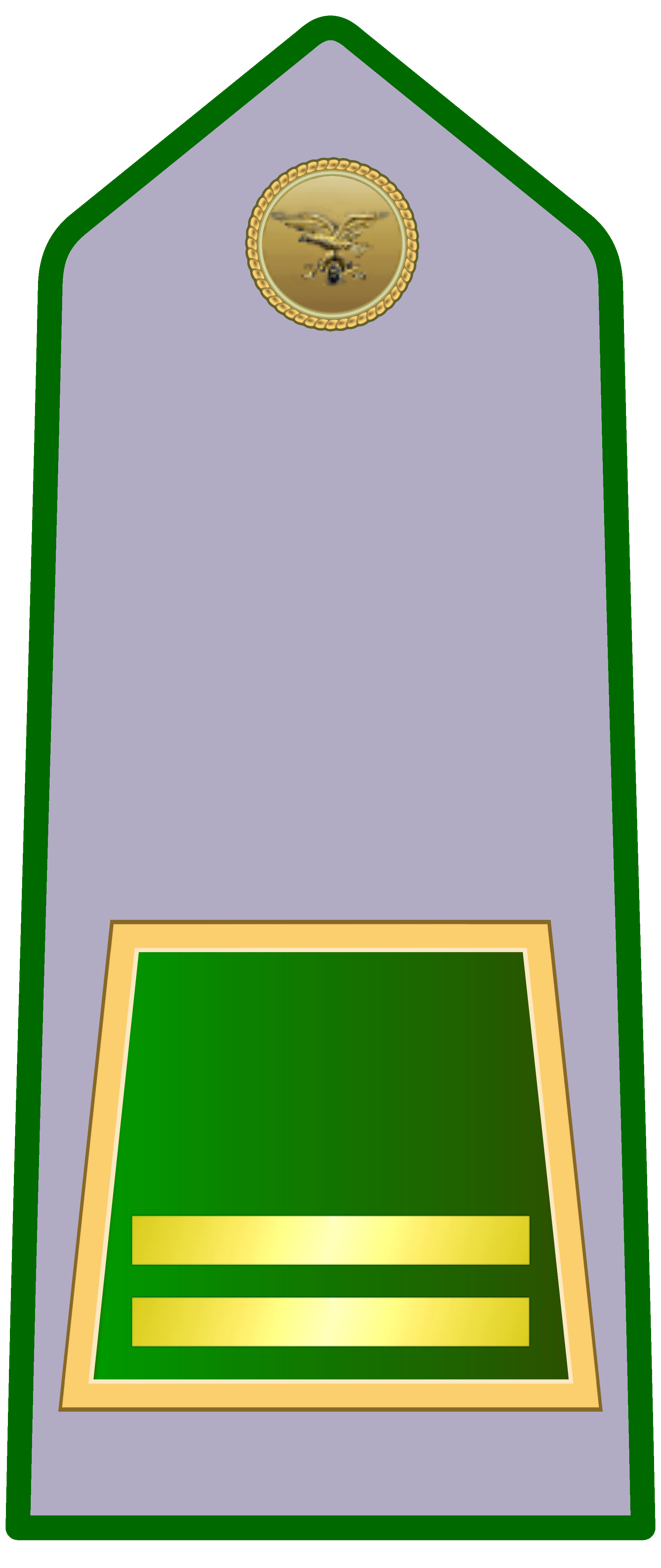
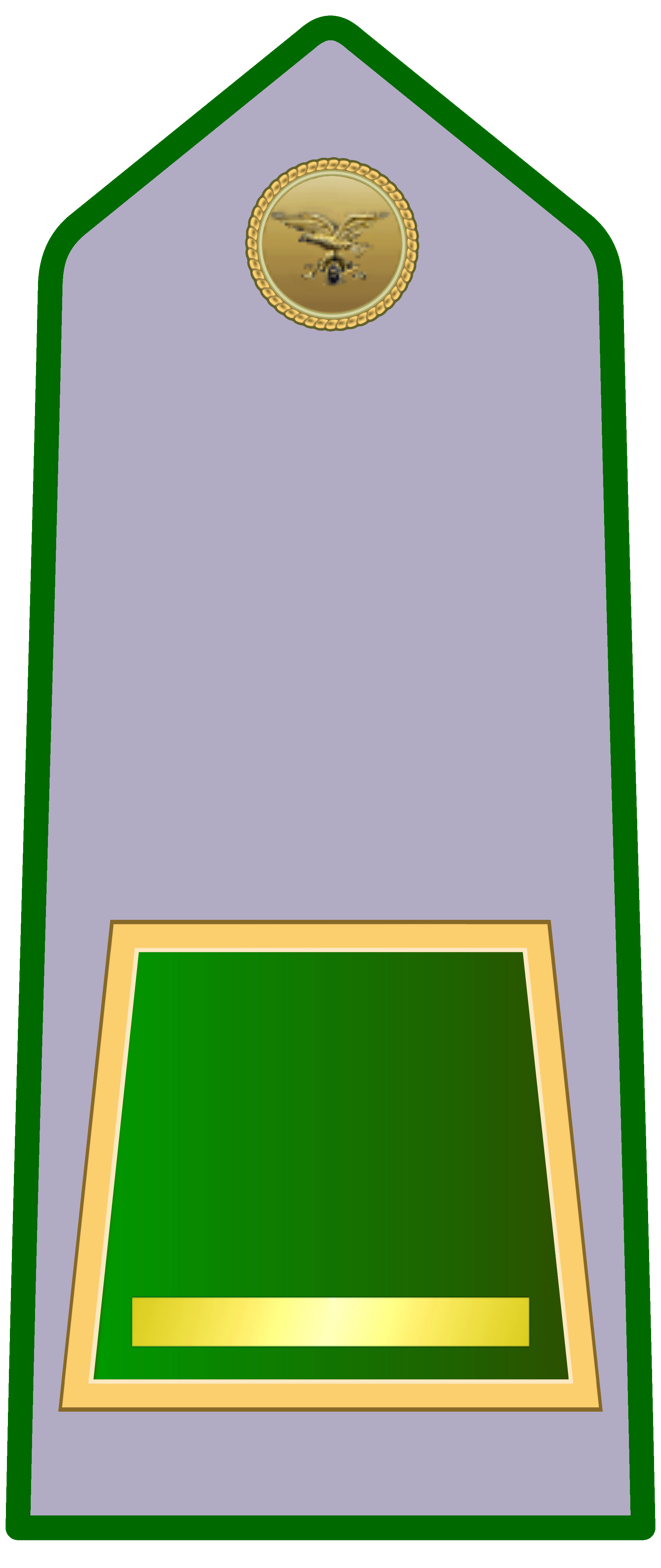
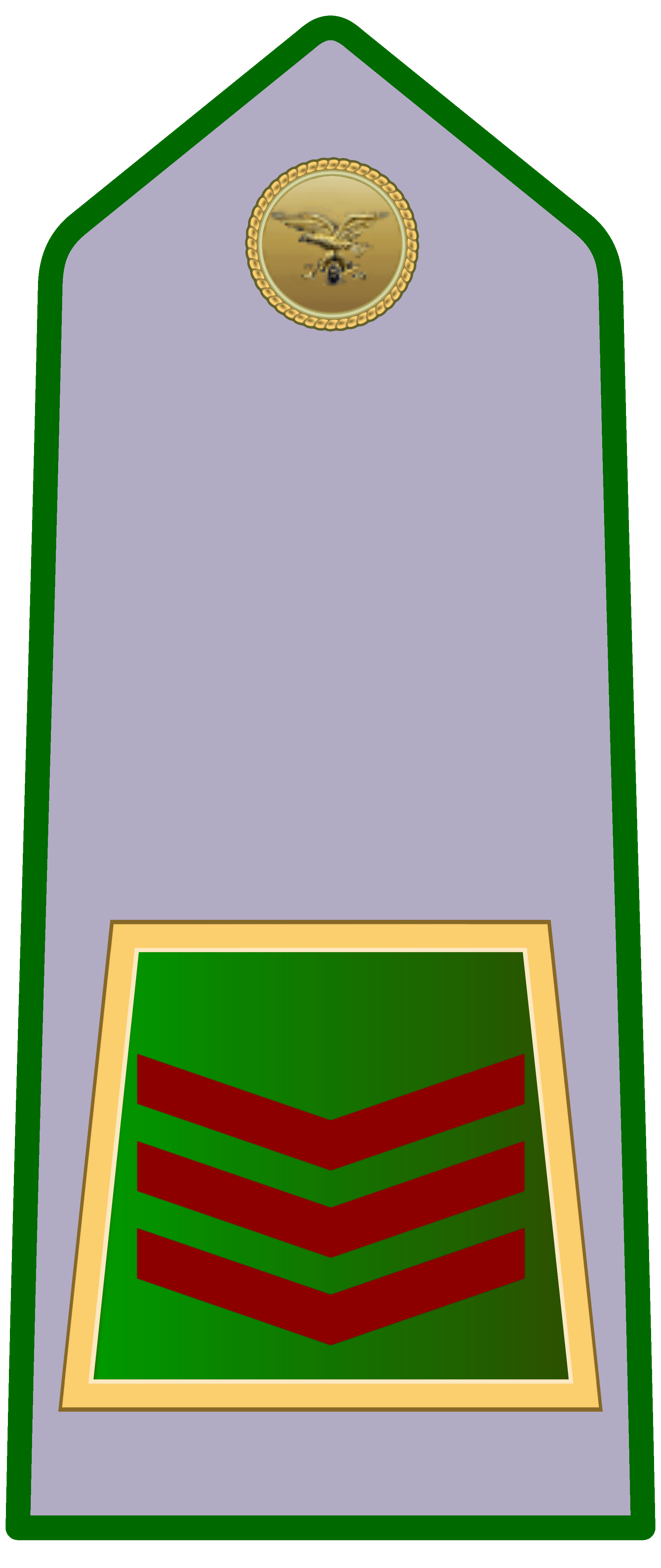
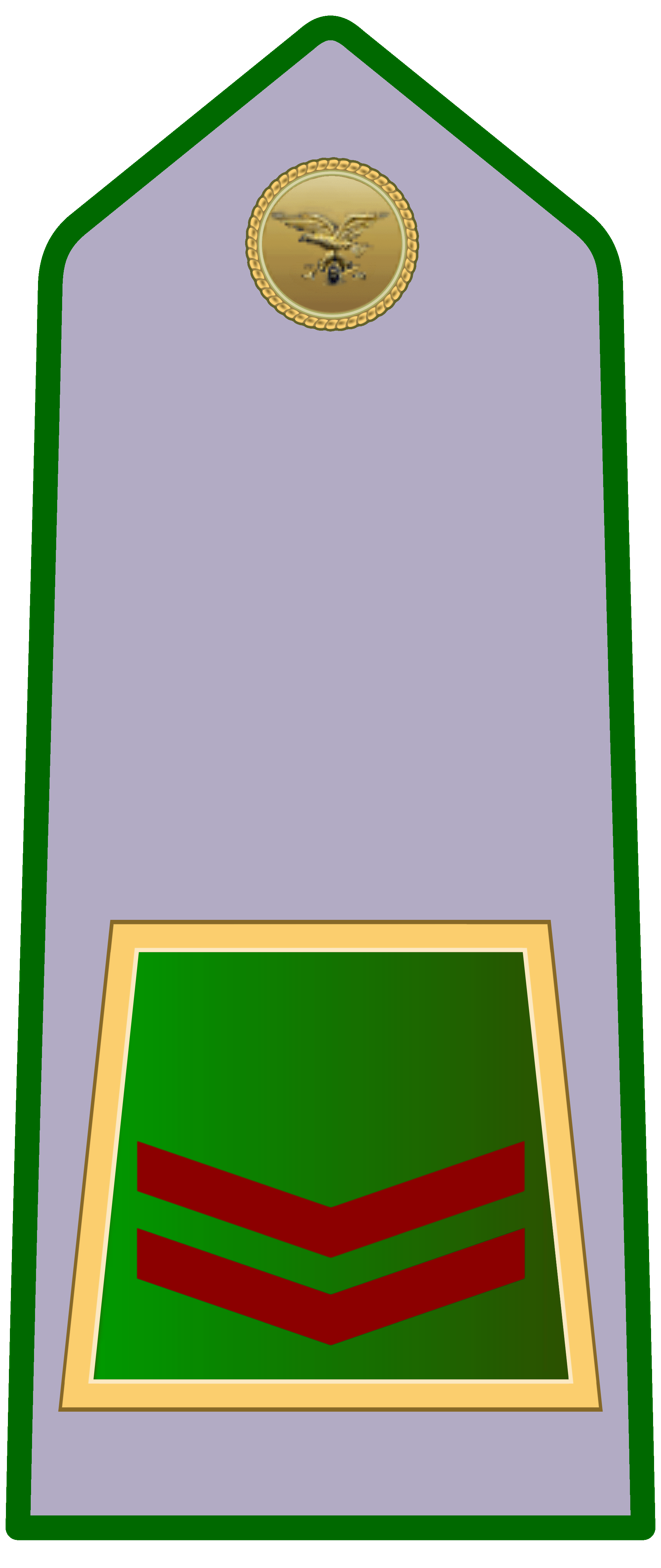
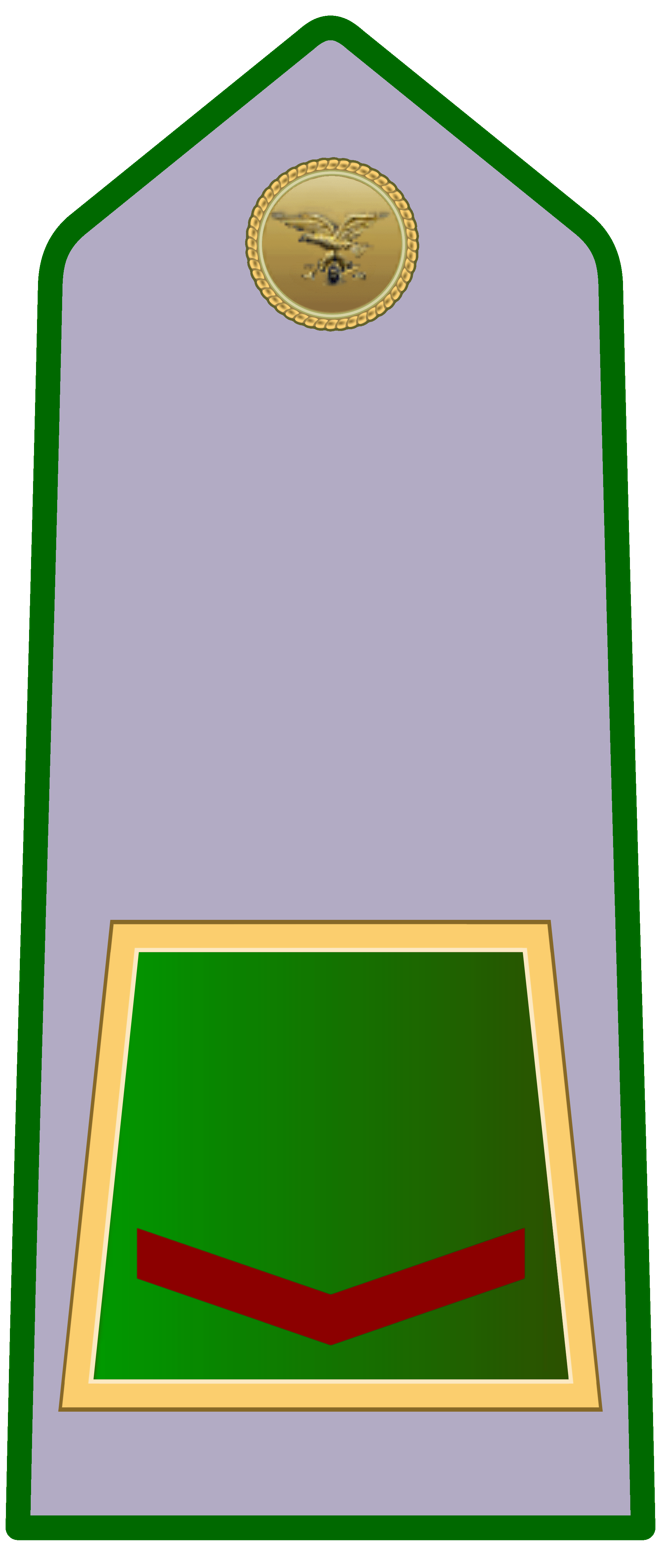
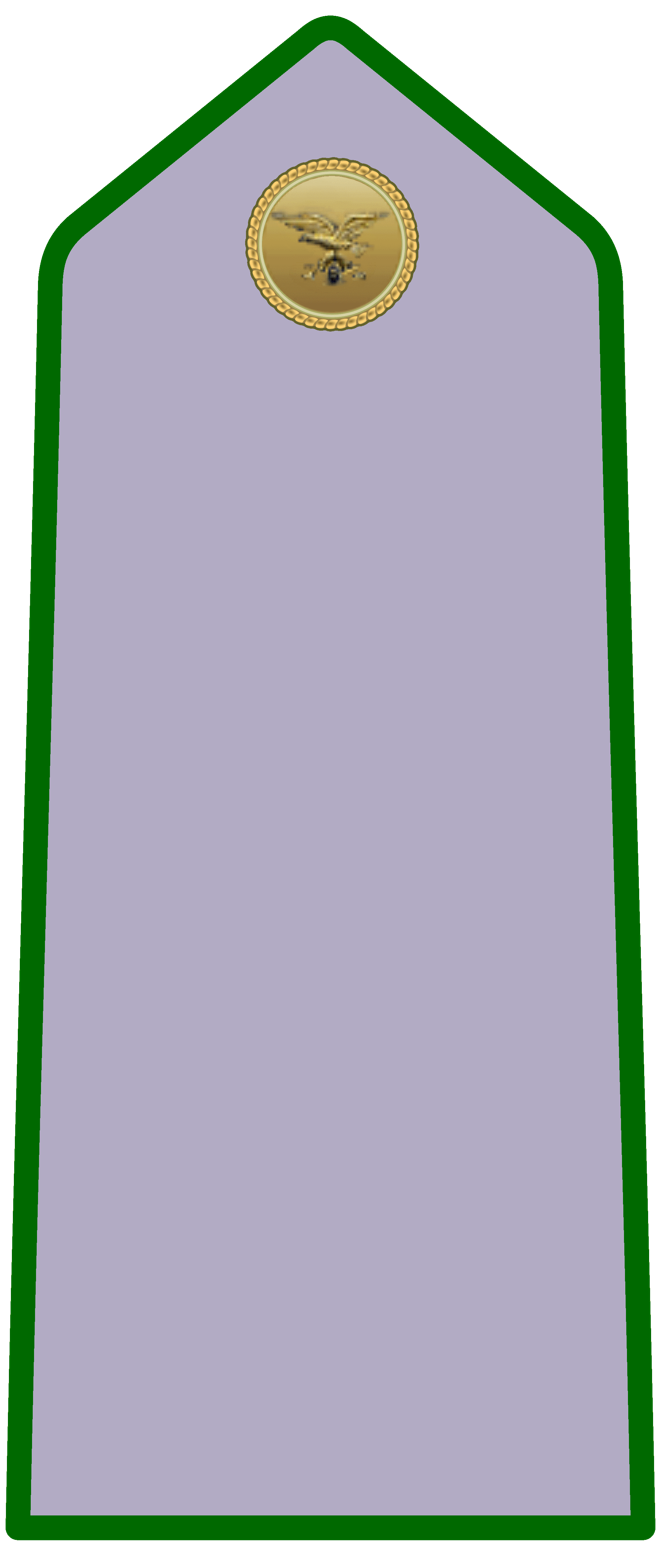
NATO code	OR-9			OR-8		OR-7	OR-6	OR-5	OR-4				OR-3	OR-2	OR-1
Corpo forestale dello Stato
Corpo forestale dello Stato	Ispettore superiore scelto	Ispettore superiore	Ispettore capo	Ispettore	Vice ispettore	Sovrintendente capo	Sovrintendente	Vice sovrintendente	Assistente capo	Assistente	Agente scelto	Agente

== See also ==
- Gruppo Sportivo Forestale
- Meteomont
