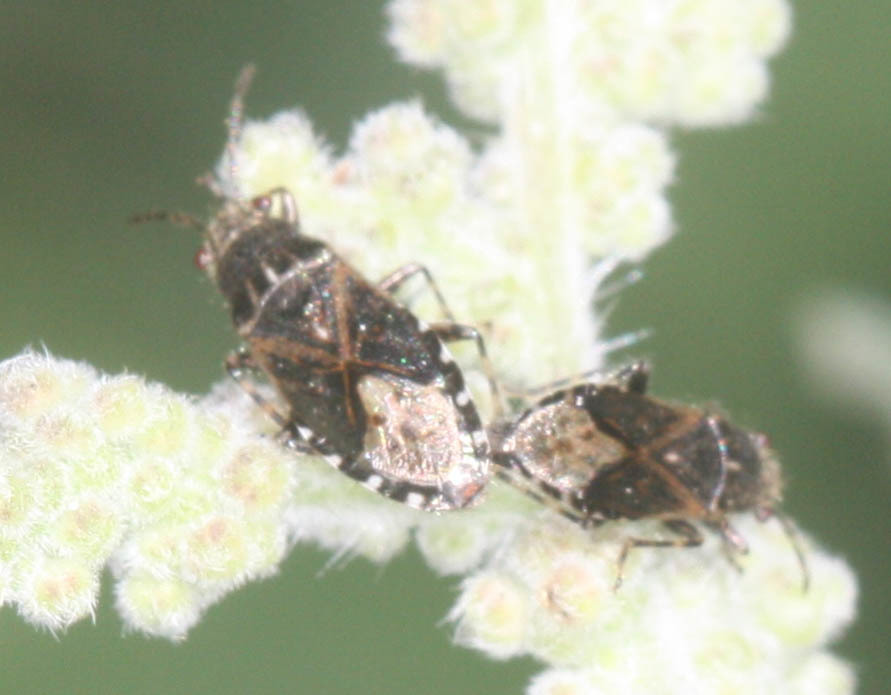

Scientific classification
- Domain: Eukaryota
- Kingdom: Animalia
- Phylum: Arthropoda
- Class: Insecta
- Order: Hemiptera
- Suborder: Heteroptera
- Family: Heterogastridae
- Genus: Heterogaster
- Species: H. behrensii

Binomial name
- Heterogaster behrensii (Uhler, 1876)

= Heterogaster behrensii =

Species of true bug

Heterogaster behrensii is a species of true bug in the family Heterogastridae. It is found in Central America and North America.
