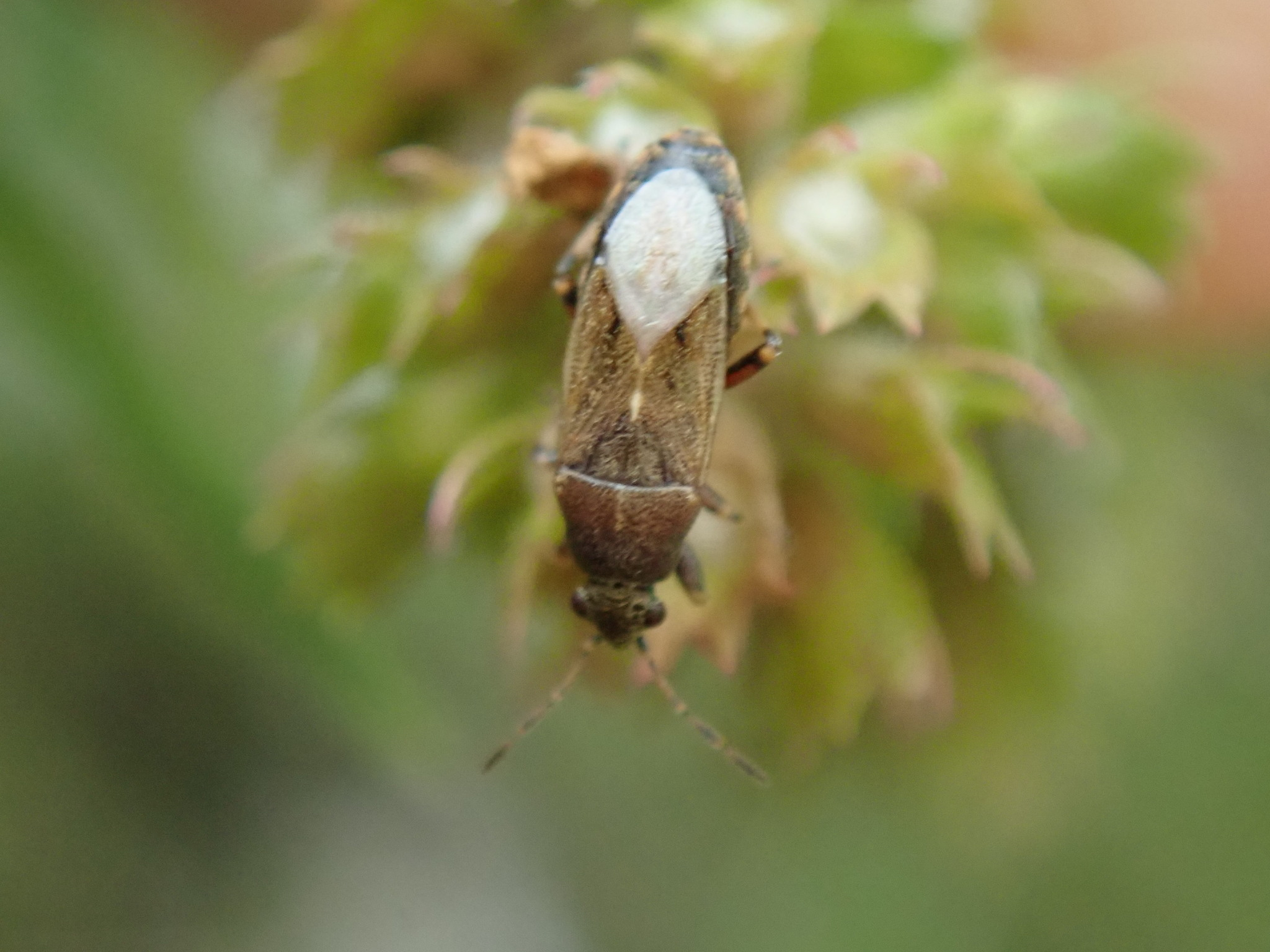

Scientific classification
- Kingdom: Animalia
- Phylum: Arthropoda
- Class: Insecta
- Order: Hemiptera
- Suborder: Heteroptera
- Family: Heterogastridae
- Genus: Heterogaster
- Species: H. artemisiae

Binomial name
- Heterogaster artemisiae Schilling, 1829

= Heterogaster artemisiae =

Species of true bug

Heterogaster artemisiae is a species of seed bug in the family Heterogastridae. It found in much of Europe, in North Africa (Algeria, Morocco), the Canary Islands, and in central to western Asia (Turkey, Syria, Turkestan, Iran). It has been reported as a pest of common thyme in Hungary.
