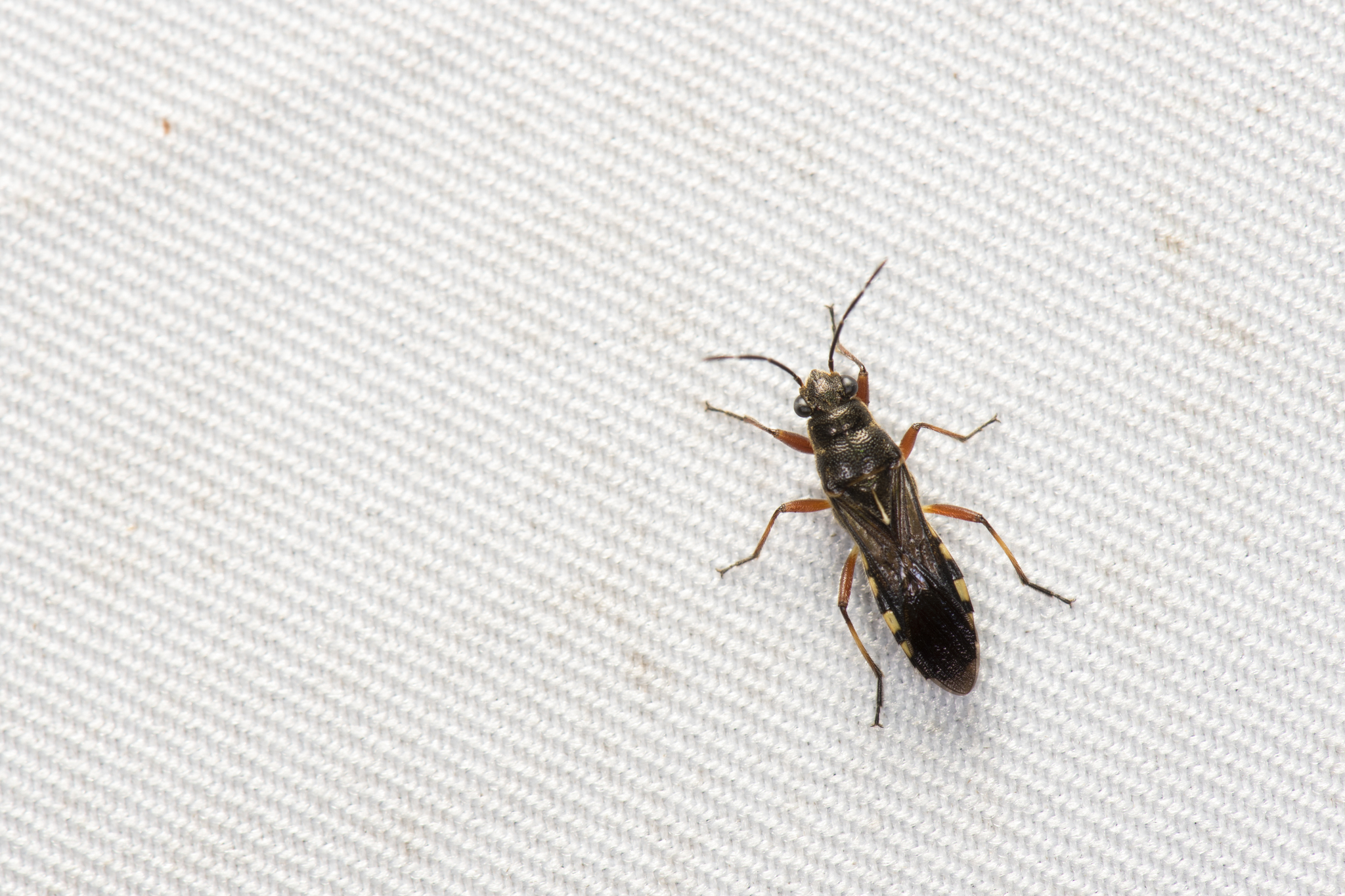
- Nerthus taivanicus, Taiwan

Scientific classification
- Domain: Eukaryota
- Kingdom: Animalia
- Phylum: Arthropoda
- Class: Insecta
- Order: Hemiptera
- Suborder: Heteroptera
- Family: Heterogastridae
- Genus: Nerthus
- Species: N. taivanicus

Binomial name
- Nerthus taivanicus (Bergroth, 1914)

= Nerthus taivanicus =

Species of pentatomomorphan bug

Nerthus taivanicus is a species of pentatomomorphan bug in the family Heterogastridae, found in eastern and southeastern Asia.
