= Climate of Rome =

Rome and its metropolitan area has a Mediterranean climate (Köppen climate classification: Csa), with mild winters and hot summers. According to Troll-Paffen climate classification, Rome has a warm-temperate subtropical climate (Warmgemäßigt-subtropisches Zonenklima). According to Siegmund/Frankenberg climate classification, Rome has a subtropical climate.

== Daylight ==
Rome is more southerly than most cities in Europe, and the duration of daylight throughout the year is more similar to Chicago or New York City (all three at approximately 40°N) than Berlin (~52°N) or Paris (48°N). Days in winter are not as short as in northern Europe, and the average duration of daylight in December, January and February is 10 hours (for comparison: London or Moscow or Warsaw – about 8 hours).

Average hours of daylight
Month	Jan	Feb	Mar	Apr	May	Jun	Jul	Aug	Sep	Oct	Nov	Dec
hours of light	10	11	12	13	15	15	15	14	12	11	10	9
hours of Twilight/Night	14	13	12	11	9	9	9	10	12	13	14	15

== Sunshine and UV index ==
Sunshine duration is about 2,500-2,700 hours per year, from 147 – average 4.7 hours of sunshine per day in December to 338 – average 10.9 hours of sunshine per day in July. With the exception of Madrid, Lisbon and Athens, Rome has the highest UV index between European capitals (only in the continent) and values close to that of Chicago at 41.9 °N as ultraviolet radiation is less interfered with by other geographic variables, but with a moderate annual average with index equal to 5, which allows direct exposure to the sun at some times of the year. Values range from 1 (December) to 9 (July).

Climate data for Rome
Month	Jan	Feb	Mar	Apr	May	Jun	Jul	Aug	Sep	Oct	Nov	Dec	Year
Mean monthly sunshine hours	120.9	132.8	167.4	201.0	263.5	285.0	331.7	297.6	237.0	195.3	129.0	111.6	2,473
Mean daily sunshine hours	3.9	4.7	5.4	6.7	8.5	9.5	10.7	9.6	7.9	6.3	4.3	3.6	6.8
Percentage possible sunshine	46	45	57	53	60	63	73	73	66	59	43	37	57
Average ultraviolet index	2	2	4	6	7	8	9	8	6	4	2	1	5
Source: Servizio Meteorologico (mean daily and monthly sunshine hours), climatemps.com (percent possible sunshine) and Weather Atlas (UV index)

== Sea temperature ==
Average sea temperature (Civitavecchia, north of Rome centre):
Jan	Feb	Mar	Apr	May	Jun	Jul	Aug	Sep	Oct	Nov	Dec	Year
14.2 °C (57.6 °F)	13.6 °C (56.5 °F)	14.0 °C (57.2 °F)	15.3 °C (59.5 °F)	18.7 °C (65.7 °F)	22.7 °C (72.9 °F)	24.4 °C (75.9 °F)	24.6 °C (76.3 °F)	23.5 °C (74.3 °F)	20.7 °C (69.3 °F)	18.6 °C (65.5 °F)	15.8 °C (60.4 °F)	18.9 °C (66.0 °F)

Average sea temperature (Tor San Lorenzo, south of Rome centre):
Jan	Feb	Mar	Apr	May	Jun	Jul	Aug	Sep	Oct	Nov	Dec	Year
14.5 °C (58.1 °F)	13.9 °C (57.0 °F)	14.1 °C (57.4 °F)	15.5 °C (59.9 °F)	18.8 °C (65.8 °F)	22.9 °C (73.2 °F)	24.7 °C (76.5 °F)	25.0 °C (77.0 °F)	24.0 °C (75.2 °F)	21.1 °C (70.0 °F)	19.0 °C (66.2 °F)	16.1 °C (61.0 °F)	19.1 °C (66.4 °F)

== Climatic data ==
=== Recent data ===
==== 1991-2020 period ====
Climate data for Rome Ciampino Airport, elevation: 129 m or 423 ft, 1991-2020 normals, extremes 1944–present
Month	Jan	Feb	Mar	Apr	May	Jun	Jul	Aug	Sep	Oct	Nov	Dec	Year
Record high °C (°F)	20.8 (69.4)	23.0 (73.4)	26.6 (79.9)	30.0 (86.0)	34.2 (93.6)	39.3 (102.7)	42.9 (109.2)	40.6 (105.1)	40.0 (104.0)	32.0 (89.6)	26.1 (79.0)	21.2 (70.2)	40.6 (105.1)
Mean daily maximum °C (°F)	12.0 (53.6)	13.0 (55.4)	15.8 (60.4)	18.8 (65.8)	22.3 (72.1)	28.1 (82.6)	31.0 (87.8)	31.6 (88.9)	26.7 (80.1)	22.2 (72.0)	16.9 (62.4)	12.7 (54.9)	21.0 (69.8)
Daily mean °C (°F)	7.5 (45.5)	8.0 (46.4)	10.7 (51.3)	13.6 (56.5)	18.0 (64.4)	22.5 (72.5)	25.1 (77.2)	25.4 (77.7)	21.0 (69.8)	17.0 (62.6)	12.4 (54.3)	8.5 (47.3)	15.8 (60.4)
Mean daily minimum °C (°F)	3.4 (38.1)	3.4 (38.1)	5.9 (42.6)	8.6 (47.5)	12.6 (54.7)	16.7 (62.1)	19.3 (66.7)	19.8 (67.6)	16.0 (60.8)	12.4 (54.3)	8.5 (47.3)	4.7 (40.5)	10.9 (51.6)
Record low °C (°F)	−11.0 (12.2)	−6.9 (19.6)	−6.5 (20.3)	−2.4 (27.7)	1.8 (35.2)	5.6 (42.1)	9.1 (48.4)	9.3 (48.7)	4.3 (39.7)	0.8 (33.4)	−5.2 (22.6)	−6.6 (20.1)	−11.0 (12.2)
Average precipitation mm (inches)	65.6 (2.58)	62.8 (2.47)	58.6 (2.31)	68.6 (2.70)	56.9 (2.24)	30.1 (1.19)	19.8 (0.78)	30.2 (1.19)	64.9 (2.56)	88.1 (3.47)	108.2 (4.26)	98.3 (3.87)	752.0 (29.61)
Average precipitation days (≥ 1.0 mm)	7.40	7.48	6.85	7.42	5.54	3.38	2.16	2.20	6.00	7.32	8.84	9.44	74.03
Average relative humidity (%)	75.8	71.5	70.6	70.4	69.0	65.4	63.3	64.1	69.1	74.0	77.9	77.2	70.7
Average dew point °C (°F)	3.9 (39.0)	3.5 (38.3)	5.8 (42.4)	8.5 (47.3)	12.1 (53.8)	15.1 (59.2)	16.9 (62.4)	17.7 (63.9)	15.5 (59.9)	12.9 (55.2)	9.3 (48.7)	5.2 (41.4)	10.5 (50.9)
Mean monthly sunshine hours	155.9	171.9	203.1	221.1	276.5	298.8	337.6	320.2	237.9	200.6	153.3	146.9	2,723.9
Source 1: NOAA
Source 2: Temperature estreme in Toscana

Climate data for Rome Urbe Airport (1991–2020 averages, extremes 1862–present)
Month	Jan	Feb	Mar	Apr	May	Jun	Jul	Aug	Sep	Oct	Nov	Dec	Year
Record high °C (°F)	20.2 (68.4)	23.6 (74.5)	27.0 (80.6)	30.1 (86.2)	34.5 (94.1)	40.1 (104.2)	42.9 (109.2)	40.7 (105.3)	38.4 (101.1)	32.4 (90.3)	26.8 (80.2)	22.8 (73.0)	42.9 (109.2)
Mean maximum °C (°F)	16.4 (61.5)	18.2 (64.8)	21.9 (71.4)	25.4 (77.7)	30.1 (86.2)	34.6 (94.3)	37.5 (99.5)	37.8 (100.0)	33.2 (91.8)	28.1 (82.6)	21.6 (70.9)	17.3 (63.1)	38.6 (101.5)
Mean daily maximum °C (°F)	12.6 (54.7)	13.8 (56.8)	16.8 (62.2)	20.0 (68.0)	24.8 (76.6)	29.5 (85.1)	32.6 (90.7)	32.7 (90.9)	27.9 (82.2)	22.8 (73.0)	17.1 (62.8)	13.2 (55.8)	22.0 (71.6)
Daily mean °C (°F)	7.9 (46.2)	8.6 (47.5)	11.2 (52.2)	14.2 (57.6)	18.7 (65.7)	23.1 (73.6)	26.0 (78.8)	26.1 (79.0)	21.9 (71.4)	17.4 (63.3)	12.4 (54.3)	8.7 (47.7)	16.4 (61.5)
Mean daily minimum °C (°F)	3.2 (37.8)	3.4 (38.1)	5.6 (42.1)	8.3 (46.9)	12.5 (54.5)	16.7 (62.1)	19.3 (66.7)	19.5 (67.1)	15.9 (60.6)	12.1 (53.8)	7.7 (45.9)	4.2 (39.6)	10.7 (51.3)
Mean minimum °C (°F)	−2.5 (27.5)	−2.1 (28.2)	−0.4 (31.3)	2.8 (37.0)	7.1 (44.8)	11.3 (52.3)	14.4 (57.9)	14.6 (58.3)	10.8 (51.4)	6.5 (43.7)	1.5 (34.7)	−1.6 (29.1)	−3.8 (25.2)
Record low °C (°F)	−9.8 (14.4)	−9.0 (15.8)	−6.0 (21.2)	−2.5 (27.5)	−0.4 (31.3)	6.0 (42.8)	9.8 (49.6)	8.6 (47.5)	5.4 (41.7)	−2.7 (27.1)	−7.2 (19.0)	−5.4 (22.3)	−9.8 (14.4)
Average precipitation mm (inches)	65.6 (2.58)	62.8 (2.47)	58.6 (2.31)	68.6 (2.70)	56.9 (2.24)	30.1 (1.19)	19.8 (0.78)	30.2 (1.19)	64.9 (2.56)	88.1 (3.47)	108.2 (4.26)	98.3 (3.87)	752.0 (29.61)
Average precipitation days (≥ 1 mm)	7.5	7.4	6.9	7.4	5.5	3.4	2.2	2.2	6.0	7.3	8.8	9.4	74.0
Average relative humidity (%)	75.8	71.5	70.6	70.4	69.0	65.4	63.3	64.1	69.1	74.0	77.9	77.2	70.7
Average dew point °C (°F)	3.9 (39.0)	3.5 (38.3)	5.8 (42.4)	8.5 (47.3)	12.1 (53.8)	15.1 (59.2)	16.9 (62.4)	17.7 (63.9)	15.5 (59.9)	12.9 (55.2)	9.3 (48.7)	5.2 (41.4)	10.5 (50.9)
Mean monthly sunshine hours	155.9	171.9	203.1	221.1	276.5	298.8	337.6	320.2	237.9	200.6	153.3	146.9	2,723.9
Percentage possible sunshine	53	58	55	56	61	65	73	75	63	58	51	51	60
Source: National Oceanic and Atmospheric Administration (NOAA)

=== Old data ===
==== 1971-2000 period ====
Climate data for Rome Ciampino Airport (altitude: 105 m sl, 13 km south-east from Colosseum satellite view)
Month	Jan	Feb	Mar	Apr	May	Jun	Jul	Aug	Sep	Oct	Nov	Dec	Year
Record high °C (°F)	20.8 (69.4)	23.0 (73.4)	26.6 (79.9)	30.0 (86.0)	34.2 (93.6)	37.8 (100.0)	39.6 (103.3)	40.6 (105.1)	40.0 (104.0)	32.0 (89.6)	26.1 (79.0)	21.2 (70.2)	40.6 (105.1)
Mean daily maximum °C (°F)	11.9 (53.4)	13.0 (55.4)	15.2 (59.4)	17.7 (63.9)	22.8 (73.0)	26.9 (80.4)	30.3 (86.5)	30.6 (87.1)	26.5 (79.7)	21.4 (70.5)	15.9 (60.6)	12.6 (54.7)	20.4 (68.7)
Daily mean °C (°F)	7.5 (45.5)	8.2 (46.8)	10.2 (50.4)	12.6 (54.7)	17.2 (63.0)	21.1 (70.0)	24.1 (75.4)	24.5 (76.1)	20.8 (69.4)	16.4 (61.5)	11.4 (52.5)	8.4 (47.1)	15.2 (59.4)
Mean daily minimum °C (°F)	3.1 (37.6)	3.5 (38.3)	5.2 (41.4)	7.5 (45.5)	11.6 (52.9)	15.3 (59.5)	18.0 (64.4)	18.3 (64.9)	15.2 (59.4)	11.3 (52.3)	6.9 (44.4)	4.2 (39.6)	10.0 (50.0)
Record low °C (°F)	−11.0 (12.2)	−6.9 (19.6)	−6.5 (20.3)	−2.4 (27.7)	1.8 (35.2)	5.6 (42.1)	9.1 (48.4)	9.3 (48.7)	4.3 (39.7)	0.8 (33.4)	−5.2 (22.6)	−6.6 (20.1)	−11.0 (12.2)
Average precipitation mm (inches)	66.9 (2.63)	73.3 (2.89)	57.8 (2.28)	80.5 (3.17)	52.8 (2.08)	34.0 (1.34)	19.2 (0.76)	36.8 (1.45)	73.3 (2.89)	113.3 (4.46)	115.4 (4.54)	81.0 (3.19)	804.3 (31.67)
Average precipitation days (≥ 1 mm)	7.0	7.6	7.6	9.2	6.2	4.3	2.1	3.3	6.2	8.2	9.7	8.0	79.4
Mean monthly sunshine hours	120.9	132.8	167.4	201.0	263.5	285.0	331.7	297.6	237.0	195.3	129.0	111.6	2,472.8
Source: Servizio Meteorologico, data of sunshine hours (1971–2000), extremes 1944–present

Climate data for Rome Fiumicino Airport (altitude: 15 m sl, 23 km west from Colosseum, near sea satellite view)
Month	Jan	Feb	Mar	Apr	May	Jun	Jul	Aug	Sep	Oct	Nov	Dec	Year
Record high °C (°F)	20.1 (68.2)	22.1 (71.8)	26.3 (79.3)	28.4 (83.1)	33.1 (91.6)	36.5 (97.7)	38.6 (101.5)	37.2 (99.0)	37.6 (99.7)	33.6 (92.5)	26.5 (79.7)	20.9 (69.6)	38.6 (101.5)
Mean daily maximum °C (°F)	13.4 (56.1)	13.9 (57.0)	15.6 (60.1)	17.8 (64.0)	22.2 (72.0)	25.9 (78.6)	28.8 (83.8)	29.4 (84.9)	26.2 (79.2)	22.1 (71.8)	17.2 (63.0)	14.2 (57.6)	20.6 (69.1)
Daily mean °C (°F)	8.6 (47.5)	9.0 (48.2)	10.7 (51.3)	12.9 (55.2)	17.1 (62.8)	20.8 (69.4)	23.6 (74.5)	24.1 (75.4)	21.1 (70.0)	17.1 (62.8)	12.4 (54.3)	9.6 (49.3)	15.6 (60.1)
Mean daily minimum °C (°F)	3.8 (38.8)	4.1 (39.4)	5.7 (42.3)	8.0 (46.4)	11.9 (53.4)	15.6 (60.1)	18.3 (64.9)	18.8 (65.8)	16.0 (60.8)	12.1 (53.8)	7.7 (45.9)	5.0 (41.0)	10.6 (51.1)
Record low °C (°F)	−7.8 (18.0)	−5.6 (21.9)	−4.6 (23.7)	−0.9 (30.4)	1.6 (34.9)	8.6 (47.5)	10.6 (51.1)	10.5 (50.9)	7.8 (46.0)	1.9 (35.4)	−4.2 (24.4)	−4.7 (23.5)	−7.8 (18.0)
Average precipitation mm (inches)	66.8 (2.63)	73.3 (2.89)	56.9 (2.24)	68.2 (2.69)	42.2 (1.66)	19.4 (0.76)	14.8 (0.58)	30.1 (1.19)	69.7 (2.74)	114.2 (4.50)	102.6 (4.04)	82.5 (3.25)	740.7 (29.16)
Average precipitation days (≥ 1 mm)	8.2	8.0	7.1	7.9	4.2	2.8	1.5	2.7	5.1	7.2	9.2	7.9	71.8
Source: Servizio Meteorologico (1971–2000), extremes 1959–present (excluding the Oct. record high)

Climate data for Rome Ciampino Airport
Month	Jan	Feb	Mar	Apr	May	Jun	Jul	Aug	Sep	Oct	Nov	Dec	Year
Mean daily maximum °C (°F)	11.5 (52.7)	12.5 (54.5)	15.3 (59.5)	19.1 (66.4)	24.1 (75.4)	28.5 (83.3)	31.3 (88.3)	31.5 (88.7)	26.9 (80.4)	22.3 (72.1)	17.0 (62.6)	12.7 (54.9)	21.1 (70.0)
Daily mean °C (°F)	7.2 (45.0)	7.6 (45.7)	10.4 (50.7)	13.9 (57.0)	18.5 (65.3)	22.8 (73.0)	25.4 (77.7)	25.3 (77.5)	21.1 (70.0)	17.0 (62.6)	12.5 (54.5)	8.6 (47.5)	15.9 (60.6)
Mean daily minimum °C (°F)	3.9 (39.0)	3.7 (38.7)	6.3 (43.3)	9.3 (48.7)	13.2 (55.8)	17.1 (62.8)	19.6 (67.3)	19.7 (67.5)	16.2 (61.2)	12.7 (54.9)	8.9 (48.0)	5.4 (41.7)	11.3 (52.3)
Average precipitation mm (inches)	91.8 (3.61)	83.2 (3.28)	74.3 (2.93)	77.9 (3.07)	78.7 (3.10)	45.9 (1.81)	26.8 (1.06)	30.8 (1.21)	65.5 (2.58)	78.8 (3.10)	125.8 (4.95)	110.6 (4.35)	890.1 (35.04)
Average precipitation days (≥ 0.1 mm)	12.9	11.6	11.6	13.0	11.0	9.1	7.1	6.9	11.0	11.0	15.0	13.9	134
Mean monthly sunshine hours	127.1	148.4	179.8	210.0	272.8	300.0	350.3	316.2	237.0	204.6	138.0	120.9	2,605
Source: climatebase.ru (2000-2011)

Climate data for Civitavecchia, Metropolitan City of Rome Capital
Month	Jan	Feb	Mar	Apr	May	Jun	Jul	Aug	Sep	Oct	Nov	Dec	Year
Mean daily maximum °C (°F)	12.8 (55.0)	13.1 (55.6)	14.6 (58.3)	16.7 (62.1)	20.3 (68.5)	23.6 (74.5)	26.5 (79.7)	27.0 (80.6)	24.9 (76.8)	21.4 (70.5)	17.0 (62.6)	13.9 (57.0)	19.3 (66.8)
Mean daily minimum °C (°F)	7.1 (44.8)	7.4 (45.3)	8.5 (47.3)	10.6 (51.1)	14.3 (57.7)	17.5 (63.5)	20.3 (68.5)	20.5 (68.9)	18.5 (65.3)	15.2 (59.4)	11.1 (52.0)	8.1 (46.6)	13.3 (55.9)
Average precipitation mm (inches)	94 (3.7)	71 (2.8)	51 (2.0)	53 (2.1)	43 (1.7)	18 (.7)	10 (.4)	25 (1)	56 (2.2)	84 (3.3)	89 (3.5)	71 (2.8)	670 (26.2)

==== 1961-1990 period ====
Climate data for Rome (Urbe Airport), elevation: 24 m or 79 ft, 1961-1990 normals
Month	Jan	Feb	Mar	Apr	May	Jun	Jul	Aug	Sep	Oct	Nov	Dec	Year
Mean daily maximum °C (°F)	12.1 (53.8)	13.7 (56.7)	16.1 (61.0)	19.2 (66.6)	23.8 (74.8)	27.7 (81.9)	31.2 (88.2)	30.9 (87.6)	27.6 (81.7)	22.6 (72.7)	16.7 (62.1)	12.8 (55.0)	21.2 (70.2)
Mean daily minimum °C (°F)	1.9 (35.4)	3.0 (37.4)	4.5 (40.1)	7.1 (44.8)	10.7 (51.3)	14.3 (57.7)	16.7 (62.1)	16.9 (62.4)	14.3 (57.7)	10.3 (50.5)	6.1 (43.0)	3.0 (37.4)	9.1 (48.3)
Average precipitation mm (inches)	82.6 (3.25)	76.0 (2.99)	68.0 (2.68)	68.2 (2.69)	47.3 (1.86)	41.0 (1.61)	22.7 (0.89)	36.1 (1.42)	75.0 (2.95)	107.7 (4.24)	120.2 (4.73)	92.5 (3.64)	837.3 (32.95)
Average precipitation days (≥ 1.0 mm)	8.8	8.1	8.5	8.1	5.8	4.3	2.2	3.2	5.1	7.2	9.9	9.5	80.7
Average relative humidity (%)	79	75	72	72	72	70	68	69	71	75	79	80	74
Source: NOAA

Climate data for Rome (Fiumicino Airport), elevation: 3 m or 9.8 ft, 1961-1990 normals
Month	Jan	Feb	Mar	Apr	May	Jun	Jul	Aug	Sep	Oct	Nov	Dec	Year
Mean daily maximum °C (°F)	12.9 (55.2)	13.7 (56.7)	15.3 (59.5)	18.0 (64.4)	22.0 (71.6)	25.6 (78.1)	28.6 (83.5)	28.7 (83.7)	26.0 (78.8)	22.0 (71.6)	17.2 (63.0)	13.9 (57.0)	20.3 (68.6)
Mean daily minimum °C (°F)	3.7 (38.7)	4.4 (39.9)	5.8 (42.4)	8.3 (46.9)	11.9 (53.4)	15.6 (60.1)	18.2 (64.8)	18.4 (65.1)	15.8 (60.4)	12.0 (53.6)	8.1 (46.6)	5.1 (41.2)	10.6 (51.1)
Average precipitation mm (inches)	80.7 (3.18)	74.9 (2.95)	65.0 (2.56)	54.7 (2.15)	31.8 (1.25)	16.3 (0.64)	14.7 (0.58)	33.3 (1.31)	68.2 (2.69)	93.4 (3.68)	110.5 (4.35)	89.6 (3.53)	733.1 (28.87)
Average precipitation days (≥ 1.0 mm)	8.8	8.1	8.5	8.1	5.8	4.3	2.2	3.2	5.1	7.2	9.9	9.5	80.7
Average relative humidity (%)	75	75	75	75	75	73	72	73	75	76	77	77	75
Source: NOAA

== See also ==
- Climate of Ancient Rome
