= Carabinieri Command of the Forest, Environmental and Agri-food units =

Italian military unit

Command of the Forest, Environmental and Agri-food units
- Comando unità forestali, ambientali e agroalimentari
- Active: 25 October 2016-present
- Country: Italy
- Branch: Carabinieri
- Type: Gendarmerie
- Role: law enforcement, forestry and environmental police
- Size: unit command 8,500 troops ca.
- Headquarters: Rome
- Nickname: Carabinieri Forestali

Commanders
- Current commander: Gen. C.A. Ciro D’Angelo

The Command of the Forest, Environmental and Agri-food units of the Carabinieri (Italian: Comando unità forestali, ambientali e agroalimentari CUFAA) is a specialized unit of the Italian Carabinieri force. Established on October 25, 2016, it has absorbed the personnel and functions of the State Forestry Corps from 1 January 2017.

== History ==
While the Carabinieri Command of Units for Forestry Environmental and Agri-food protection was established in 2016, the Carabinieri have established their own units devoted to the environmental protection since 1986.

=== Ecological Operational Unit ===
The Ecological Operational Unit (Nucleo Operativo Ecologico, N.O.E.) of the Carabinieri was established on 1 December 1986, being placed at the functional dependence of the Ministry of the Environment, with duties of supervision, prevention and repression of the violations committed in environmental matters.

=== Carabinieri Command for the Protection of the Environment ===
On 23 March 2001, the N.O.E. changed its name to Carabinieri Command for the Protection of the Environment (Comando Carabinieri per la Tutela dell'Ambiente). The organizational structure of the Command was strengthened and calibrated on inter-provincial basis, in order to guarantee a qualified presence throughout the national territory. The peripheral teams inherited the name of Ecological Operational Unit.

=== Command of Units for Forestry, Environmental and Agri-food protection ===
In 2016, due to the merger of the State Forestry Corps into the Carabinieri, the Carabinieri Command of Units for Forestry, Environmental and Agri-food protection was established. Therefore, some units until then subordinated to the Carabinieri Specialist Units Division were transferred to the newly-established command: the Carabinieri Command for Environmental Protection (Comando Carabinieri per la Tutela dell’Ambiente) and the Carabinieri Command for Agricultural and Food Policies (Comando Carabinieri Politiche Agricole e Alimentari).

=== Commanders ===
Since its establishment, the Command of the Forest, Environmental and Agri-food protection units has been led by Army Corps Generals:

- Gen. C.A. Antonio Ricciardi (2016-2018);
- Gen. C.A. Angelo Agovino (2018-2019)
- Gen.C.A. Ciro D’Angelo (2019–present)

== Mission ==
This department of the Arma dei Carabinieri is responsible for protecting Italy's natural resources, the environment, countryside and ecosystems, especially national parks and national forests. As all Carabinieri departments, it is under the authority of the Ministry of Defense, but for its specialized tasks depends on the ministry of Agriculture, Food and Forestry.

Its specialised duties include arresting poachers, investigating environmental violations, illegal building, counterfeit foods, safeguarding protected animal species, enforcing endangered species laws, and preventing and fighting wildfires. It has responsibility for managing activities related to the Convention on International Trade in Endangered Species in Italy.

== Dependence ==
The Command hierarchically depends directly on the Commandant General of the Carabinieri and functionally on two Ministries: it depends on the Ministry of Agricultural, Food and Forestry Policies for activities pertaining the food security and the forest protection; on the other hand, the Command functionally depends on the Ministry of the Environment, Protection of Land and Sea for activities related to the Ministry's own tasks.

== Organization ==
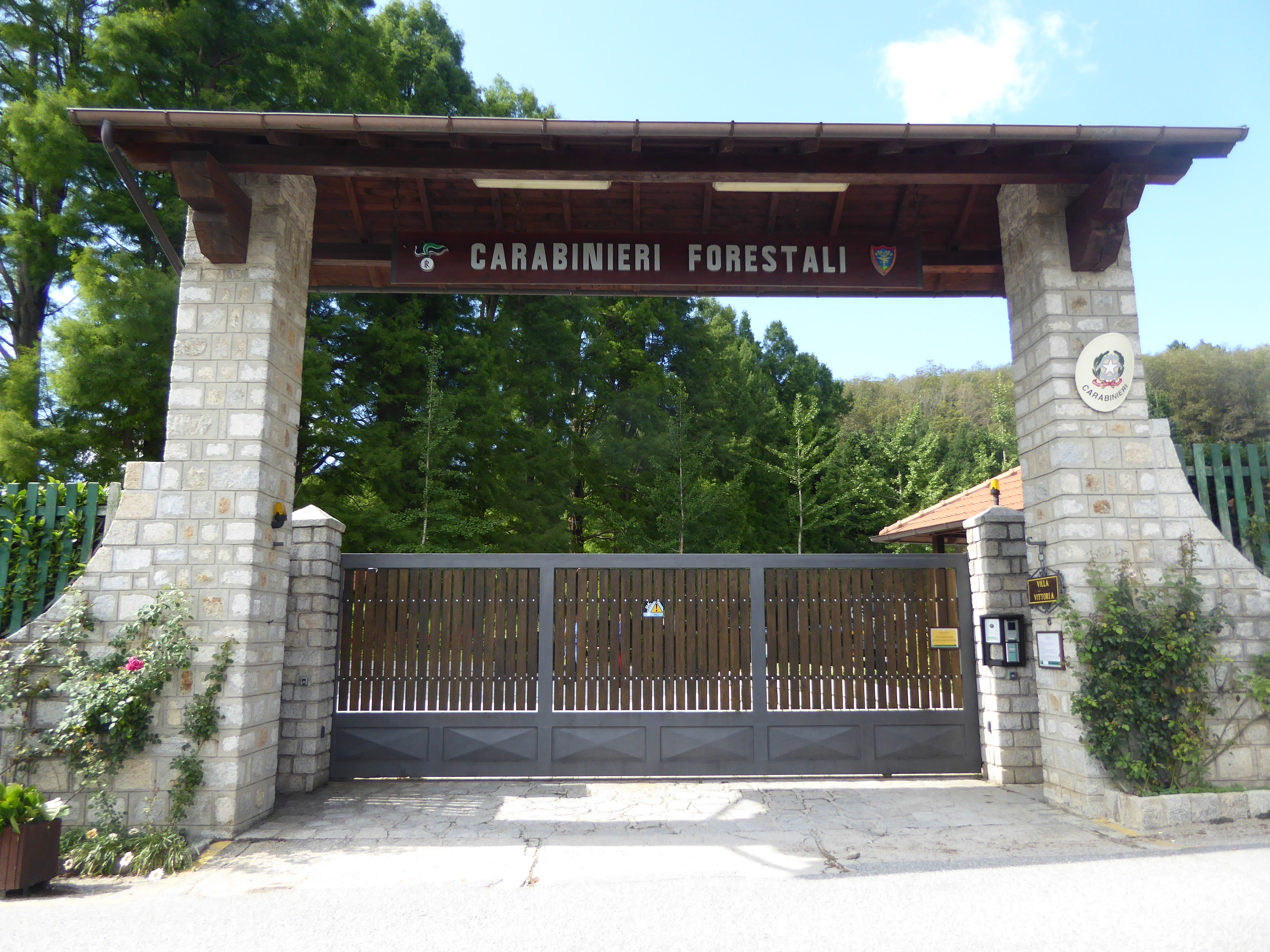
Forestry Carabinieri station

The Command for the Forest, Environmental and Agri-food protection units is the body with carries out the activities of the Organization for Forestry, Environmental and Agri-food Protection. The CUTFAA Commander is a Lieutenant General and it is assisted by the Deputy Commander (who controls the Command Office), by the Chief of Staff (who commands the Command's Staff), and by the Secretariat; the Military Chaplain of the Command is directly dependent on the CUTFAA Commander.

While the Commander comes from the Normal Role of Carabinieri, the Deputy Commander comes from the Forest Role of the Carabinieri (currently the Initial Forest Role of the Carabinieri, i.e. former State Forestry Corps civilian officials).

The Command is subdivided into four Commands:

- Carabinieri Command for the Forest Protection (Comando Carabinieri per la Tutela Forestale);
- Carabinieri Command for the Protection of Biodiversity and Parks (Comando Carabinieri per la Tutela della Biodiversità e dei Parchi);
- Carabinieri Command for the Environmental Protection (Comando Carabinieri per la Tutela Ambientale);
- Carabinieri Command for the Agri-food Protection (Comando Carabinieri per la Tutela Agroalimentare).

It counts circa 8500 military personnel providing environmental and biodiversity protection and combating illicit agri-foodstuffs, poaching, and criminal organizations that harm environment.

=== Carabinieri Command for Forest Protection ===
The Carabinieri Command for Forest Protection is the territorial and garrison arm of the environmental organization. The Command, led by a Lieutenant General, brings together in a single command all forest units with territorial tasks and without a particular specialized connotation. The Command is led by a Brigadier General of the Forest Role, and under its direct control:

- Command Office;
- Forest Fire Protection Information Unit (Nucleo Informativo Antincendio Boschivo, NIAB): an intelligence unit tasked with the contrast to forest fires;
- 14 Carabinieri Forest Region Commands (Comandi Regione Carabinieri Forestale): one in each Region with ordinary statute (except Abruzzo and Molise, which share a single Command).

The Region Commands, in turn, bring together the 83 Carabinieri Forest Groups and five Nature Criminal Centers (in Palermo, Catania, Agrigento, Cagliari and Udine). Each of the Carabinieri Forest Groups includes:

- Command Unit;
- Environmental, Agri-food and Forest Police Investigation Unit;
- CITES Unit.

The 788 Carabinieri Forestali Stations depend on the Carabinieri Forest Groups and are the peripheral terminals of the Carabinieri for the Forest sector.

As of 2017, the Command included 4,563 Carabinieri.

=== Carabinieri Command for the Protection of Biodiversity and Parks ===
The Carabinieri Command for the Protection of Biodiversity and Parks is led by a Brigadier General or by a Major General. The Command exercises management, coordination and control functions of:

- Command Office;
- Projects and Studies Office;
- Conventional Activities Development Center;
- Wildfire Analysis Unit;
- Carabinieri Grouping Biodiversity (Raggruppamento Carabinieri Biodiversità): responsible for the protection of biodiversity in the 130 Italian state nature reserves. The Carabinieri Grouping Parks operates with 20 Carabinieri National Parks Units, which in turn control almost 150 Carabinieri Park Stations (as well as three detachments). The related Biodiversity Office manages and coordinates 28 Carabinieri Territorial Offices for Biodiversity.
- Carabinieri Grouping Parks (Raggruppamento Carabinieri Parchi): responsible for the protection of national parks. The Carabinieri Grouping Biodiversity is organized in 28 Carabinieri Biodiversity Units, on which three National Biodiversity Carabinieri Centers and 40 Carabinieri Biodiversity Protection Centers (in addition to two Detachments) depend.
- Carabinieri Grouping CITES (Raggruppamento Carabinieri CITES): in charge for the application of CITES. The Carabinieri Grouping CITES has an Operational Unit (in charge of information and investigative activity), in technical and functional connection with the 35 CITES Units (in addition to 11 detachments) of the Carabinieri Forest Groups or the Nature Anti-crime Centers of the Carabinieri Command for the Forest Protection. The Carabinieri CITES service supports the Guardia di Finanza.

=== Carabinieri Command for the Environmental Protection ===
The Carabinieri Command for Environmental Protection is divided into:

- 1 Operational Unit.
- 12 Units (Reparti, in: Milan, Turin, Venice, Rome, Bologna, Ancona, Florence, Palermo, Naples, Bari, Reggio Calabria, Cagliari);
- 31 Ecological Operational Units (Nuclei Operativi Ecologici).

The Command has the function of combating the phenomena of pollution, of illegal construction in protected areas and of illegal disposal of toxic substances. The supervision of the "waste cycle" is also one of the functions of this Command which, by contrasting environmental degradation, contributes directly and actively to the collective well-being. Specifically, the activities of this Command are aimed to develop the most complex investigations, with ultra-provincial and transnational connotations.

The info-operative activities on local and provincial phenomena are conducted by the Agri-food and Forest Police Investigation Units of the Carabinieri Forest Groups.

=== Carabinieri Command for the Agri-food Protection ===
The Carabinieri Command for the Agri-food Protection supervises the agriculture and fishing sector. The Command is organized into:

- Command Office;
- 1 central Operational Unit;
- 5 Agro-Food Protection Units (Turin, Parma, Rome, Salerno and Messina) at the interregional level.

The central unit is primarily committed to ensuring that the Community funding provided is not directed towards illegal interests, as well as protecting consumers through controls on the production cycle, in full respect of the ecosystem, to guarantee the genuineness of the products. Finally, particular care is given to the verification of the quality of foodstuffs sent from Italy to other countries as forms of support.

== Criticism ==
The Command of the Forest, Environmental and Agri-food protection units has been criticized since it was proposed.

Criticism is focused on two main fields: the process of militarization of civilian personnel and, on the other hand, the inefficiencies following the merger.

The process of militarization was strongly opposed by the unions of the State Forestry Corps (now dissolved due to the change in the legal status of the personnel) and was subject to administrative appeals, in turn subject to the scrutiny of the Constitutional Court. As of January 2019, the Constitutional Court has not issued any judgment.

Furthermore, the merger has been labeled as a "failure" by Minister of Public Administration Giulia Bongiorno, who has vowed to overcome the merger after the judgment of the Constitutional Court.

Criticism of the inefficiency mainly regards or regarded the actual process of administrative unification and the allocation of fire-fighting vehicles to the Carabinieri instead of the Vigili del Fuoco.
