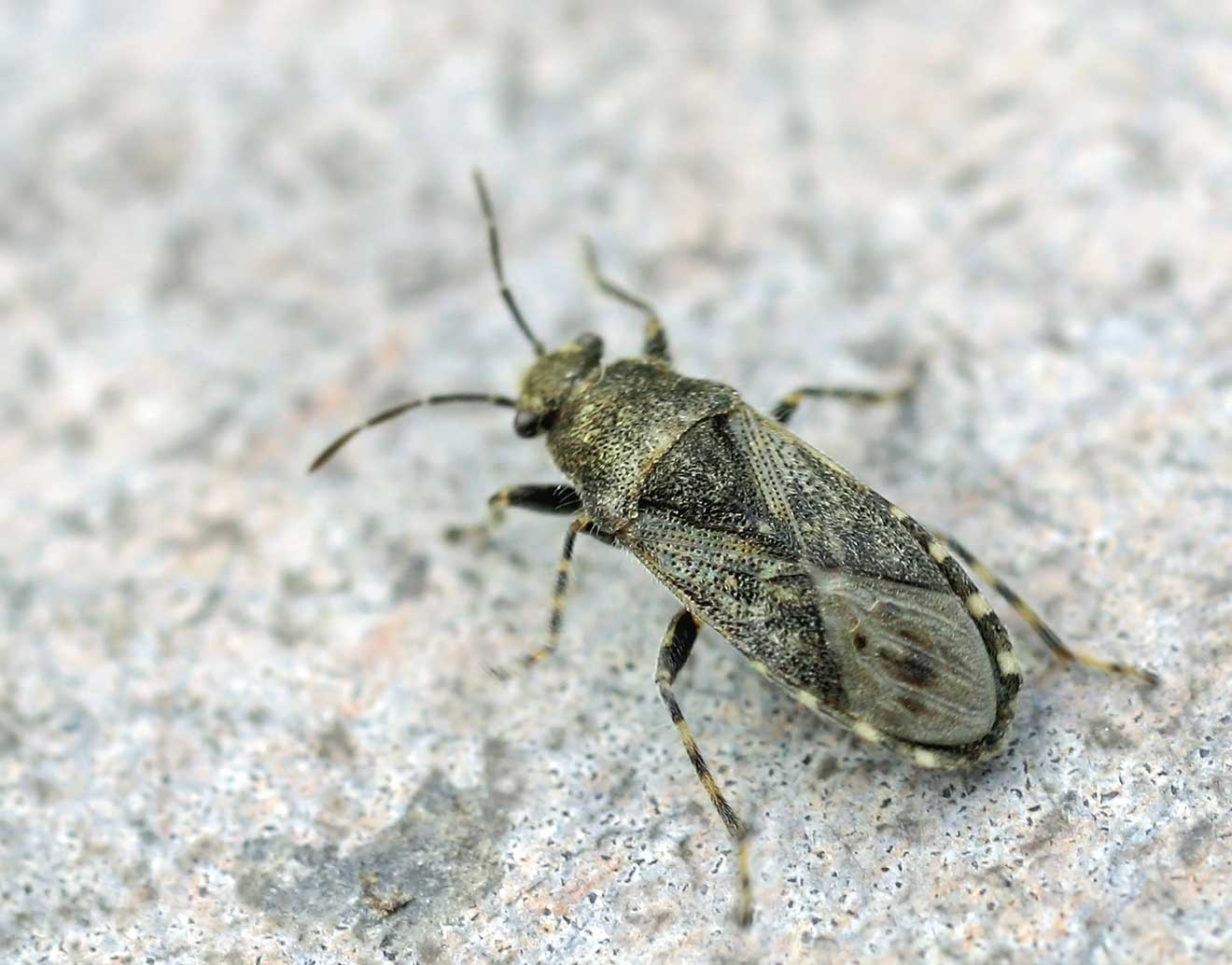
- Heterogaster urticae

Scientific classification
- Kingdom: Animalia
- Phylum: Arthropoda
- Class: Insecta
- Order: Hemiptera
- Suborder: Heteroptera
- Family: Heterogastridae
- Genus: Heterogaster; Schilling, 1829

= Heterogaster =

Genus of true bugs

Heterogaster is a genus of seed bugs in the family Heterogastridae. There are about 11 species, nine of the Old World, and two of the New World.

== Species ==
Heterogaster includes the species:

- Heterogaster affinis
- Heterogaster artemisiae
- Heterogaster behrensii
- Heterogaster flavicosta
- Heterogaster urticae (Fabricius, 1775) - the "Nettle Ground Bug"
