= Servizio Meteorologico =

National meteorological service of Italy

- Established: 1876 (150 years ago)
- Headquarters: Pratica di Mare Air Base
- Country: Italy
- Parent organisations: Italian Air Force
- Website: www.meteoam.it

The Italian Meteorological Service (Italian: Servizio Meteorologico dell'Aeronautica Militare) is an organizational unit of the Italian Air Force and the national meteorological service in Italy. The weather forecasts and other services serve both the armed forces and the general public.

== Organization ==
Unlike almost all other national meteorological services, its historical development in Italy has led to it being within the armed forces. On the one hand this avoids duplication between government civilian and military weather services. On the other military priorities entail disadvantages in comparison to purely civilian organizations, especially in the field of international cooperation.

The Italian Air Force Weather Service reports to a department at the General Staff of the Air Force in Rome. They are also responsible for planning and policy matters to promote international cooperation through the World Meteorological Organization.

The headquarters of the Meteorological Service is located on the Pratica di Mare Air Base near Rome. Here the key information processing takes place and the distribution of analysis and forecasts on military, civil aviation, maritime, civil defense and other authorities and users, as well as the mass media.

There are three sub offices:

- At the Milan Linate Airport (Regional Center of Northern Italy, Avalanche special Team SAR "Meteomont" in cooperation with the Army Mountain Troops Command and the Forest Guards),
- At the former Vigna di Valle Air Base in Bracciano, near Rome (quality assurance, certification, testing and research, mobile weather stations for military operations abroad, Climatological weather observations at 41 stations),
- 84 staffed and 110 automatic weather stations transmit their data back to the headquarters. In addition, there is a special meteorological department of the Ministry of Agriculture.
