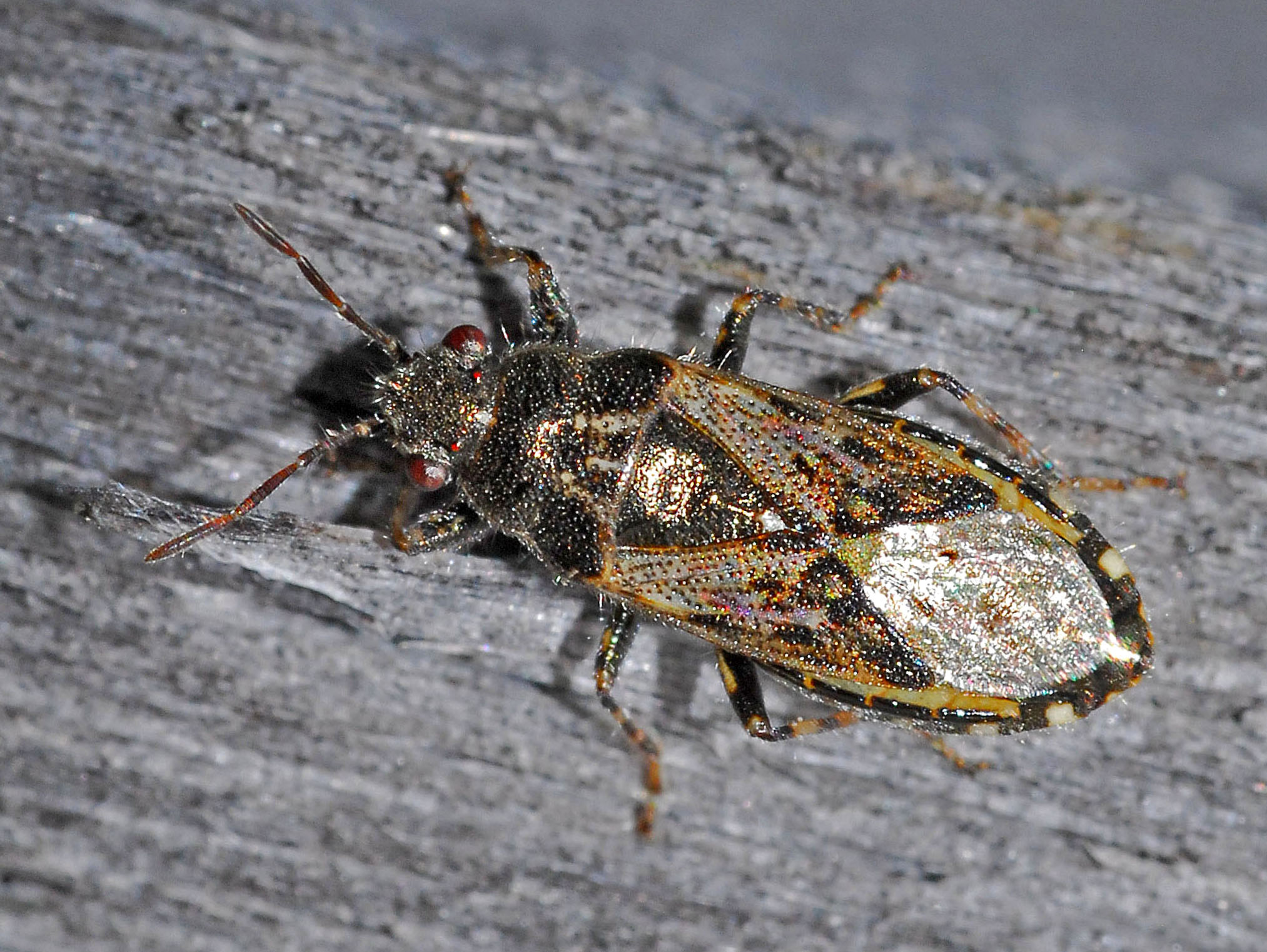
- Heterogaster urticae. Adult

Scientific classification
- Domain: Eukaryota
- Kingdom: Animalia
- Phylum: Arthropoda
- Class: Insecta
- Order: Hemiptera
- Suborder: Heteroptera
- Family: Heterogastridae
- Genus: Heterogaster
- Species: H. urticae

Binomial name
- Heterogaster urticae (Fabricius, 1775)

Synonyms
- List: Aphanus urticae (Fabricius, J.C., 1775); Cimex urticae (Fabricius, J.C., 1775); Heterogaster notatipes (Walker, F., 1872); Lygaeus urticae (Fabricius, J.C., 1775); Lygaeus (Phygadicus) urticae (Fabricius, J.C., 1775); Pachymerus urticae (Fabricius, J.C., 1775); Phygadicus urticae (Fabricius, J.C., 1775)

= Heterogaster urticae =

Species of true bug

Heterogaster urticae, common name nettle ground bug, is a species of true bug in the family Heterogastridae.

== Distribution ==
This species can be found in Africa, Europe, Northern Asia (excluding China), New Zealand and North America.

== Description ==
Heterogaster urticae can reach a body length of about 6–7 mm (0.24–0.28 in). These shiny bugs show yellow-brown to brown pronotum and corium. Antennae are gray-yellow. The head and pronotum are covered with whitish long erect hairs. These bugs are also characterized by the alternate dark and light markings on the legs and connexivum. Moreover, fore femora are armed with a single spine and the pale tibiae show three dark annulations. The rostrum reaches only to the middle coxae.

== Biology ==
Adults overwinter beneath bark or in hollow woody stem. They emerge in the following spring and mate in June and July. During mating male and females may remain coupled together for 3–4 days. Eggs are laid with a copious secretion in the ground near the host plant. Larvae can be found until September. The new generation is complete from late summer onwards. Adults often forms conspicuous aggregations on nettles. The main hosts plants in Europe are the stinging nettles (Urtica dioica), but the bugs have been also reported on other species of Urtica and on roots of the marram grass (Ammophila arenaria) (Poaceae).

== Gallery ==
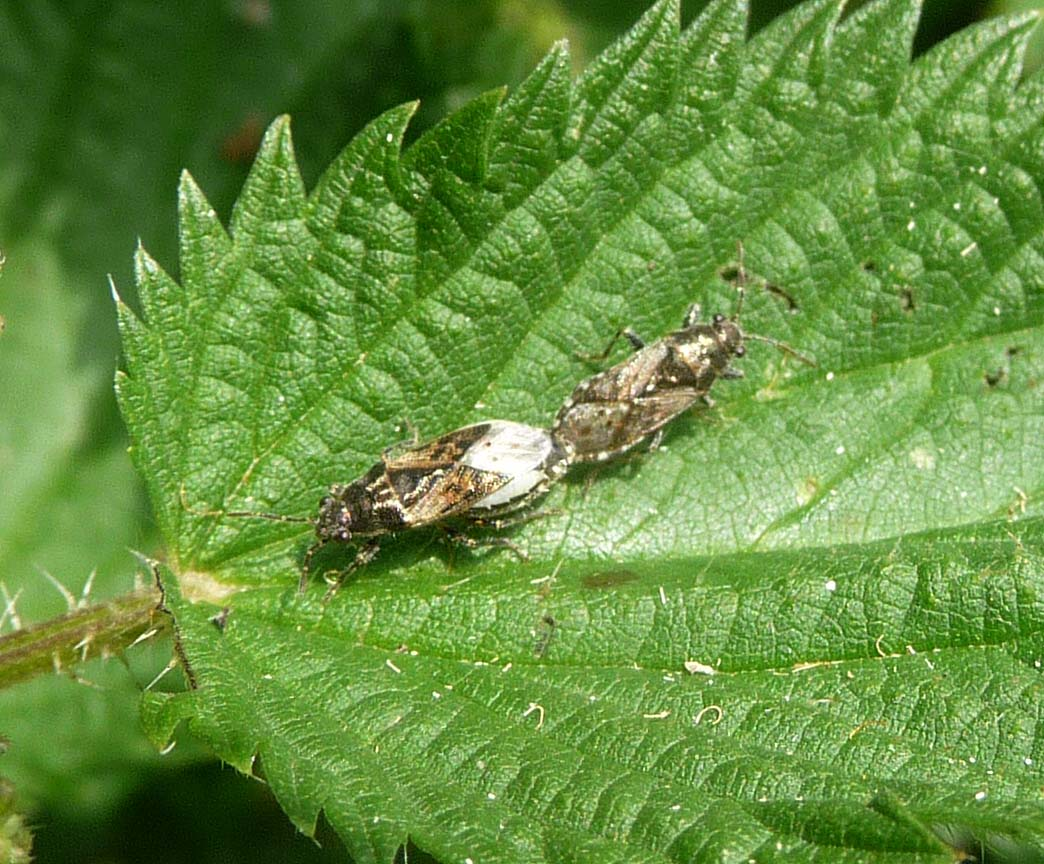
Mating

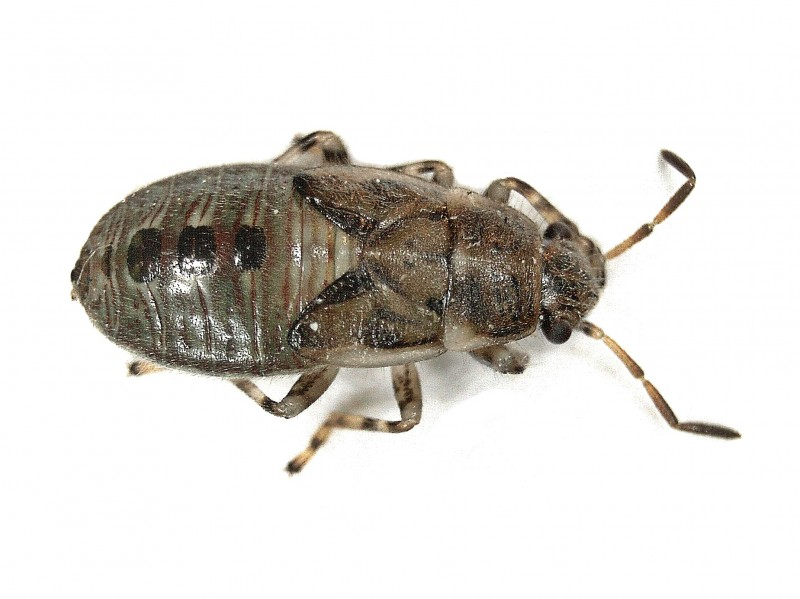
Nymph

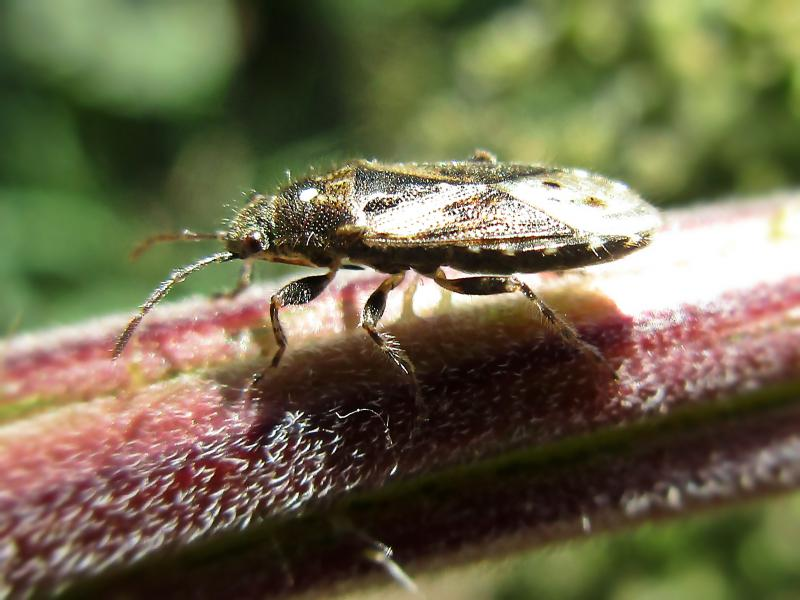
Imago
