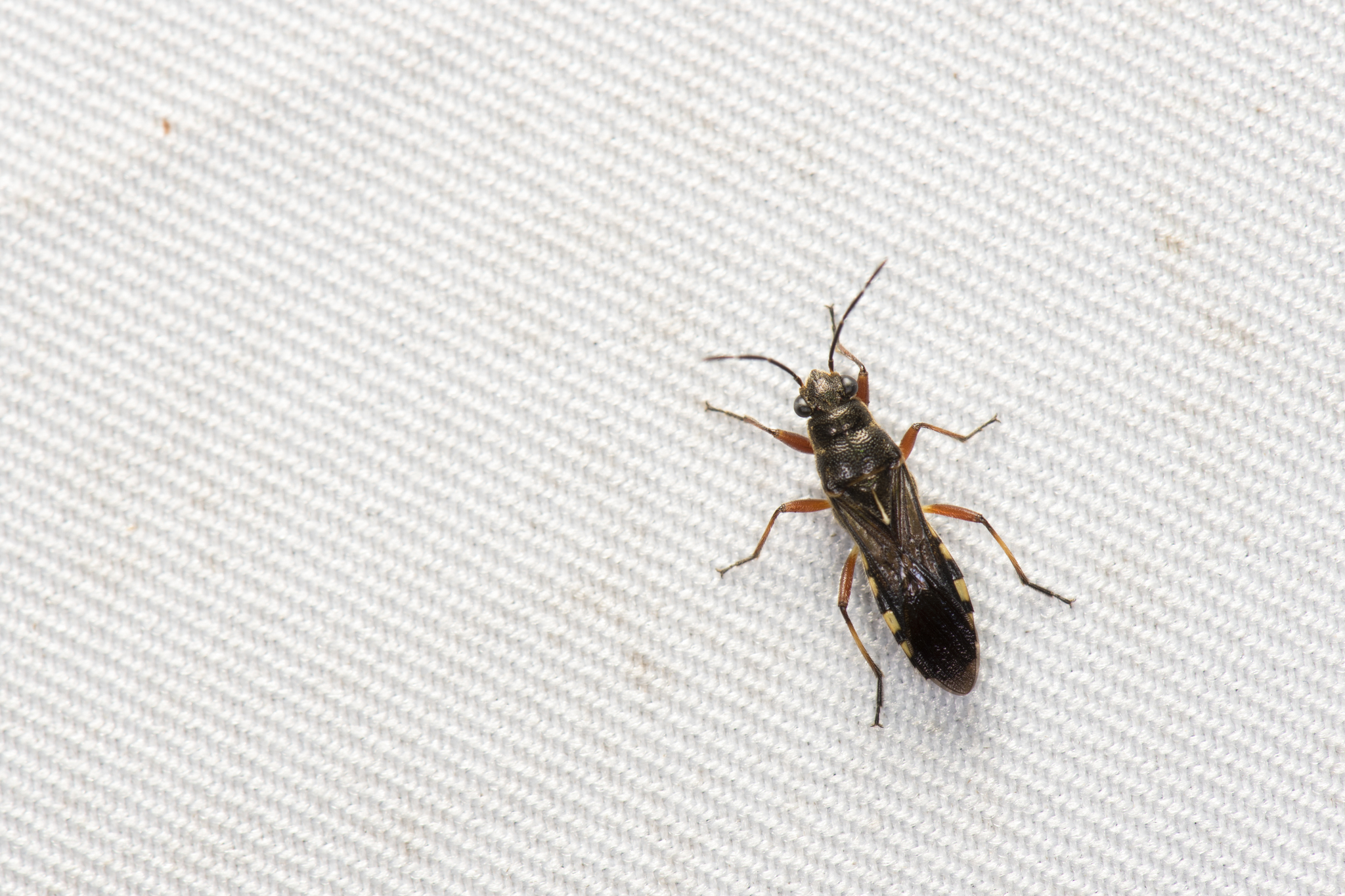
- Nerthus taivanicus, Taiwan

Scientific classification
- Kingdom: Animalia
- Phylum: Arthropoda
- Class: Insecta
- Order: Hemiptera
- Suborder: Heteroptera
- Family: Heterogastridae
- Genus: Nerthus; Distant, 1909

= Nerthus (bug) =

Genus of insects

Nerthus is a genus of seed bugs and allies in the family Heterogastridae. There are at least three described species in Nerthus, found in China and Southeast Asia.

== Species ==
These three species belong to the genus Nerthus:

- Nerthus dudgeoni Distant, 1909
- Nerthus kempi Paiva, 1919
- Nerthus taivanicus (Bergroth, 1914)
