= Meteomont =

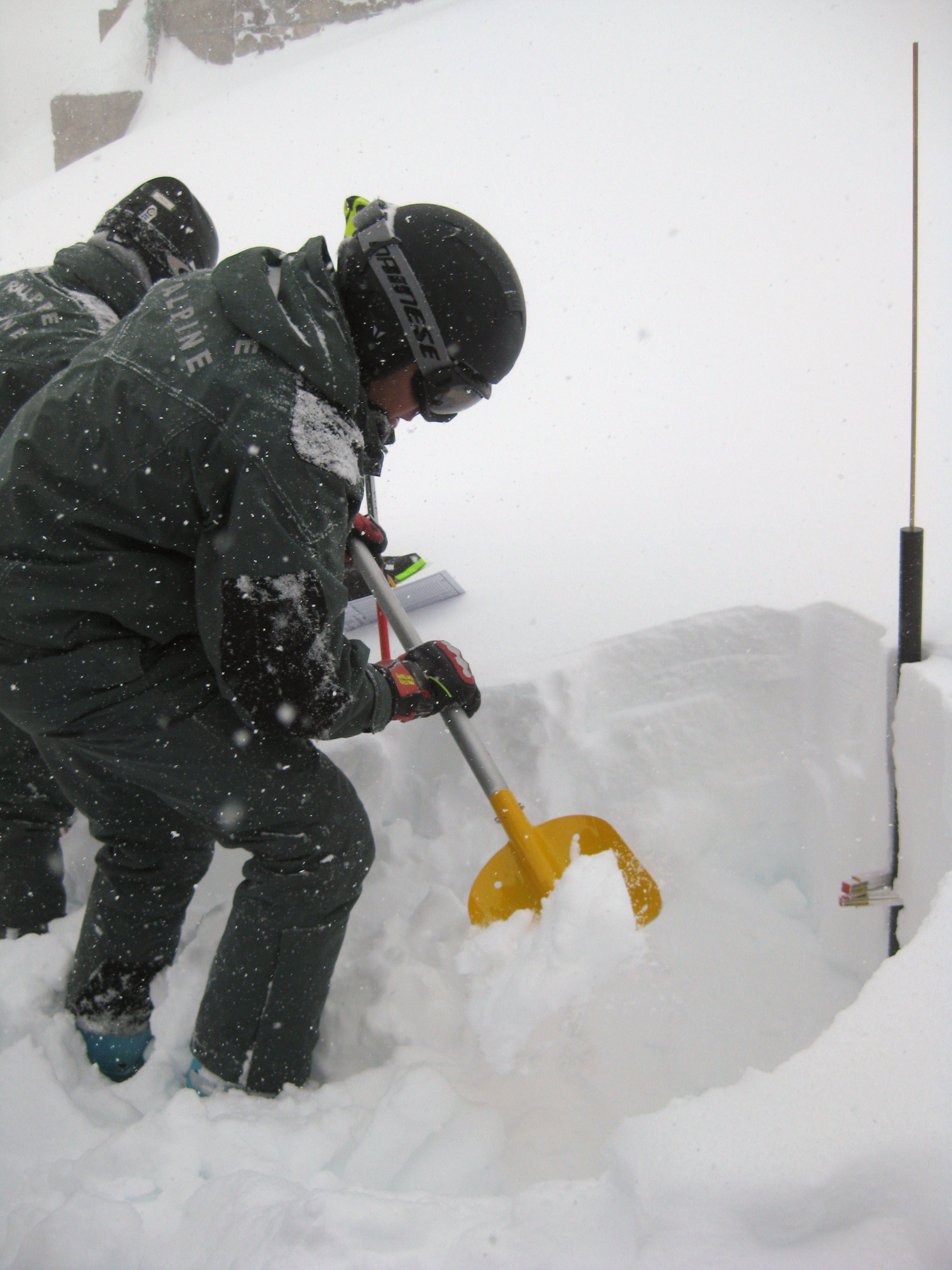
- Country: Italy
- Role: meteorology; search and rescue; avalanche risk assessment
- Website: meteomont.org

Meteomont is an Italian meteorological service, with responsibility for search and rescue, assessment of avalanche risk, for early warning of avalanches, and for assessment of mountain snow conditions in general. It is a co-operation between members of the Carabinieri law enforcement, the meteorological and intelligence service of the Aeronautica Militare, the Italian Air Force; and the Alpini, the elite mountain troops of the Italian army.
