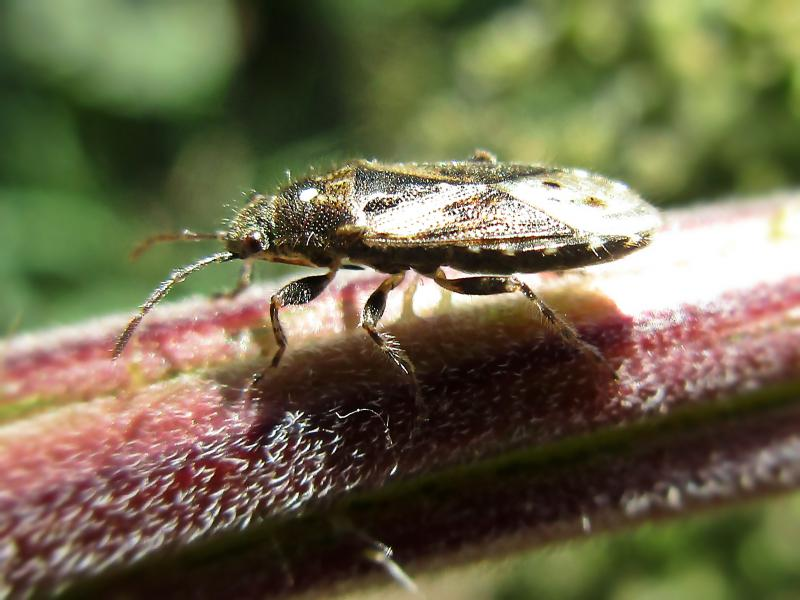
- Heterogaster urticae

Scientific classification
- Kingdom: Animalia
- Phylum: Arthropoda
- Clade: Pancrustacea
- Class: Insecta
- Order: Hemiptera
- Suborder: Heteroptera
- Infraorder: Pentatomomorpha
- Superfamily: Lygaeoidea
- Family: Heterogastridae; Stål, 1872

= Heterogastridae =

Family of true bugs

Heterogastridae is a family of lygaeoid bugs consisting of about 20 genera and more than 100 species.

The group has been considered a subfamily, tribe and subtribe, but most recently has been restored to family status.

== Genera ==
These 20 genera belong to the family Heterogastridae:

- Artemidorus Distant, 1903
- Boccharis Distant, 1904
- Depressignus Scudder, 1962
- Dinomachellus Scudder, 1957
- Dinomachus Distant, 1901
- Eranchiellus Scudder, 1957
- Heterogaster Schilling, 1829
- Hyginellus Distant, 1913
- Hyginus Stal, 1859
- Masoas Distant, 1906
- Minigellus Scudder, 1962
- Nerthus Distant, 1909
- Parasadoletus Malipatil, 2020
- Parathyginus Scudder, 1957
- Platyplax Fieber, 1860
- Sadoletus Distant, 1904
- Thyrothanus Scudder, 1957
- Trinithignus Scudder, 1962
- Walkothignus Scudder, 1968
- Woodwardothignus Slater, 1981
