= Lungotevere =

Boulevard in Rome, Italy

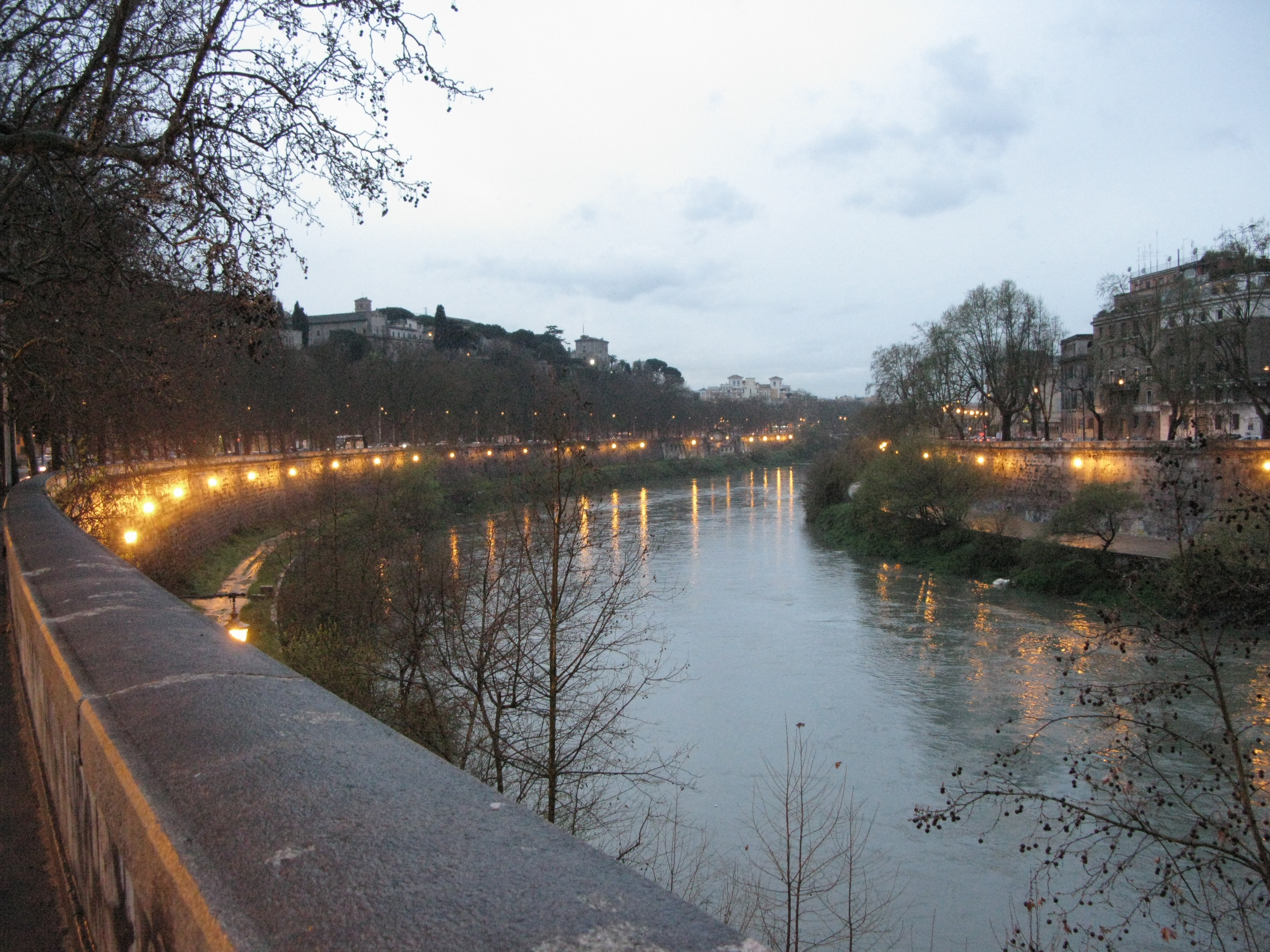
Lungotevere Aventino (left) and Lungotevere Ripa (right)

Lungotevere (Italian for Tiber Waterfront) is an alley or boulevard running along the river Tiber within the city of Rome. The building of the Lungoteveres required the demolition of the former edifices along the river banks and the construction of retaining walls called muraglioni (massive walls).

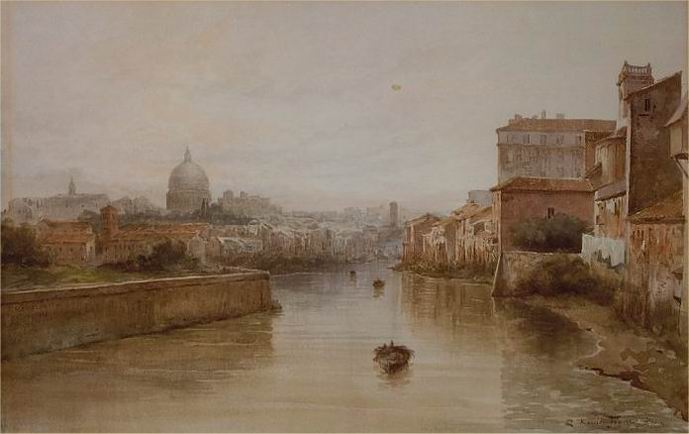
The Tiber from Ponte Sisto facing north prior to the construction of the Lungotevere in a watercolour of Ettore Roesler Franz

== History ==
The Lungoteveres were built with the main goal to eliminate and dam the overflows of the Tiber, due to its recurring floods. On July 6, 1875 a law was approved, getting off the demolition of the former buildings on the banks and the achievement of boulevards flanking the river and massive retaining walls (muraglioni); the width of the river bed was regulated up to 100 meters (330 feet). The Lungoteveres, inspired by the example of Paris, were designed by the engineer Raffaele Canevari, who managed to rescue the Tiber Island adding artificial rapids to the right branch of the Tiber below the Pons Caestius.

Many artistically and historically significant buildings, structures and churches were demolished for the construction: among them, Palazzo Altoviti, the Teatro Apollo at Tor di Nona, Sant'Anna dei Bresciani, the Ripetta Harbour, the Roman Pons Cestius (pulled down and rebuilt with wider side arches), the already damaged Roman Ponte Rotto (of which only one arch remains), some minor gates of the Aurelian Walls flanking the left bank. The Ponte Sant'Angelo was widened too, demolishing ramps on either side and replacing them with two more arches. Along with these structures, the erection of the Lungotevere provoked the loss of one of the most picturesque environments of the city.

The works began in 1876 and were completed in 1926; in the circumstance, several bridges were built, linking the two banks of the Tiber.

== List of the Lungotevere ==
The list is in geographic order, from upstream to downstream.

=== Right bank ===
Name	from	to	rione	mun.	prg
Lungotevere Maresciallo Diaz	Piazzale di Ponte Milvio	Piazza Lauro de Bosis (Ponte Duca d'Aosta)	Q XV Della Vittoria	M 20	1
Lungotevere Maresciallo Cadorna	Piazza Lauro de Bosis	Piazzale Maresciallo Giardino	Q XV Della Vittoria and R XXII Prati	M 20 and M 1	2
Lungotevere Della Vittoria	Piazzale Maresciallo Giardino	Piazza del Fante	Q XV Della Vittoria	M 1	3
Lungotevere Guglielmo Oberdan	Piazza del Fante	Piazza Monte Grappa (Ponte del Risorgimento)	Q XV Della Vittoria	M 1	4
Lungotevere delle Armi	Piazza Monte Grappa	Piazza Cinque Giornate (Ponte Giacomo Matteotti)	Q XV Della Vittoria	M 1	5
Lungotevere Michelangelo	Piazza Cinque Giornate	Piazza della Libertà (Ponte Regina Margherita)	R XXII Prati	M 1	6
Lungotevere dei Mellini	Piazza della Libertà	Via Vittoria Colonna (Ponte Cavour)	R XXII Prati	M 1	7
Lungotevere Prati	Via Vittoria Colonna	via Ulpiano	R XXII Prati	M 1	8
Lungotevere Castello	Piazza dei Tribunali (Ponte Umberto I)	Ponte Sant'Angelo	R XXII Prati and R XVII Borgo	M 1	9
Lungotevere Vaticano	Ponte Sant'Angelo	Ponte Vittorio Emanuele II	R XVII Borgo	M 1	10
Lungotevere in Sassia	Via San Pio X (Ponte Vittorio Emanuele II)	Piazza Della Rovere (Ponte Principe Amedeo Savoia Aosta)	R XVII Borgo	M 1	11
Lungotevere Gianicolense	Piazza Della Rovere (Ponte Principe Amedeo Savoia Aosta)	Ponte Giuseppe Mazzini	R XIII Trastevere	M 1	12
Lungotevere della Farnesina	Ponte Giuseppe Mazzini	Piazza Trilussa (Ponte Sisto)	R XIII Trastevere	M 1	13
Lungotevere Raffaello Sanzio	Piazza Trilussa (ponte Sisto)	Piazza Giuseppe Gioachino Belli (Ponte Garibaldi)	R XIII Trastevere	M 1	14
Lungotevere degli Anguillara	Piazza Giuseppe Gioachino Belli (Ponte Garibaldi)	Ponte Cestio	R XIII Trastevere	M 1	15
Lungotevere degli Alberteschi	Ponte Cestio	Piazza Castellani (Ponte Palatino)	R XIII Trastevere	M 1	16
Lungotevere Ripa	Ponte Palatino	Via del Porto	R XIII Trastevere	M 1	17
Lungotevere Portuense	Ponte Sublicio	Ponte Testaccio	Q XI Portuense	M 16	18
Lungotevere degli Artigiani	Ponte Testaccio	Via Antonio Pacinotti (Ponte dell'Industria)	Q XI Portuense	M 16 and M15	19
Lungotevere Vittorio Gassman formerly Lungotevere dei Papareschi	Via Antonio Pacinotti (Ponte dell'Industria)	Via Pietro Blaserna	Q XI Portuense	M15	20
Lungotevere di Pietra Papa	Via Pietro Blaserna	piazza Augusto Righi (Ponte Guglielmo Marconi)	Q XI Portuense	M15	21
Lungotevere degli Inventori	Piazza Augusto Righi (Ponte Guglielmo Marconi)	Piazza Antonio Meucci	Q XI Portuense	M15	22
Lungotevere della Magliana	Via della Magliana	Viadotto della Magliana	Q XI Portuense	M15	23

The stretch between Lungotevere Ripa and lungotevere Portuense is named Porto di Ripa Grande (rione Trastevere). In the quarter Portuense, a stretch of the Lungotevere della Magliana is flanked by Riva Pian Due Torri.

=== Left bank ===
Name	from	to	rione	mun.	prg
Lungotevere dell'Acqua Acetosa	Via Foce dell'Aniene	Ponte Flaminio	Q II Parioli	M 2	1
Lungotevere Salvo D'Acquisto	Ponte Flaminio	piazzale Cardinal Consalvi (Ponte Milvio)	Q II Parioli	M 2	2
Lungotevere Grande Ammiraglio Thaon di Revel	Via Flaminia (Ponte Milvio)	Ponte Duca d'Aosta	Q I Flaminio	M 2	3
Lungotevere Flaminio	Ponte Duca d'Aosta	Piazzale delle Belle Arti (Ponte del Risorgimento)	Q I Flaminio	M 2	4
Lungotevere delle Navi	Piazzale delle Belle Arti (Ponte del Risorgimento)	Ponte Giacomo Matteotti	Q I Flaminio	M 2	5
Lungotevere Arnaldo da Brescia	Ponte Giacomo Matteotti	Ponte Regina Margherita	Q I Flaminio and R IV Campo Marzio	M 2 and M 1	6
Lungotevere in Augusta	Ponte Regina Margherita	Piazza del Porto di Ripetta (Ponte Cavour)	R IV Campo Marzio	M 1	7
Lungotevere Marzio	Piazza del Porto di Ripetta (Ponte Cavour)	R IV Campo Marzio and R V Ponte	M 1	8	
Lungotevere Tor di Nona	Piazza di Ponte Umberto I	Piazza di Ponte Sant'Angelo	R V Ponte	M 1	9
Lungotevere degli Altoviti	Ponte Sant'Angelo	Piazza Pasquale Paoli (Ponte Vittorio Emanuele II)	R V Ponte	M 1	10
Lungotevere dei Fiorentini	Piazza Pasquale Paoli (Ponte Vittorio Emanuele II)	Via Acciaioli (Ponte Principe Amedeo Savoia Aosta)	R V Ponte	M 1	11
Lungotevere dei Sangallo	Via Acciaioli (ponte Principe Amedeo Savoia Aosta)	Ponte Giuseppe Mazzini	R V Ponte and R VII Regola	M 1	12
Lungotevere dei Tebaldi	Largo Lorenzo Perosi (Ponte Giuseppe Mazzini)	Piazza San Vincenzo Pallotti (Ponte Sisto)	R VII Regola	M 1	13
Lungotevere dei Vallati	Piazza San Vincenzo Pallotti (Ponte Sisto)	Via Arenula (Ponte Garibaldi)	R VII Regola	M 1	14
Lungotevere De' Cenci	Ponte Garibaldi	Ponte Fabricio	R VII Regola and R XI Sant'Angelo	M 1	15
Lungotevere dei Pierleoni	Piazza di Monte Savello (Ponte Fabricio)	Ponte Palatino	R XII Ripa	M 1	16
Lungotevere Aventino	Ponte Palatino	Piazza dell'Emporio (Ponte Sublicio)	R XII Ripa	M 1	17
Lungotevere Testaccio	Piazza dell'Emporio (Ponte Sublicio)	Largo Giovanni Battista Marzi (Ponte Testaccio)	R XX Testaccio	M 1	18
Lungotevere di San Paolo	Via Ostiense	Piazzale Tommaso Edison (Ponte Guglielmo Marconi)	Q X Ostiense	M 11	19
Lungotevere Dante	Piazzale Tommaso Edison (Ponte Guglielmo Marconi)	Viale Guglielmo Marconi	Q X Ostiense	M 11	20

The stretch between Lungotevere Testaccio and Lungotevere San Paolo is named Riva Ostiense (quarter Ostiense).

== Sources ==
  - Rendina, Claudio; Paradisi, Donatella (2004). Le strade di Roma. Volume primo A-D. Rome: Newton Compton Editori. ISBN 88-541-0208-3.
