= Lungotevere di Pietra Papa =

- Interactive map of Lungotevere di Pietra Papa
- Namesake: Ancient Via Petra Papae (named after the Papa family)
- Location: Rome, Italy
- Quarter: Portuense
- From: Lungotevere Vittorio Gassman
- To: Piazza Augusto Righi

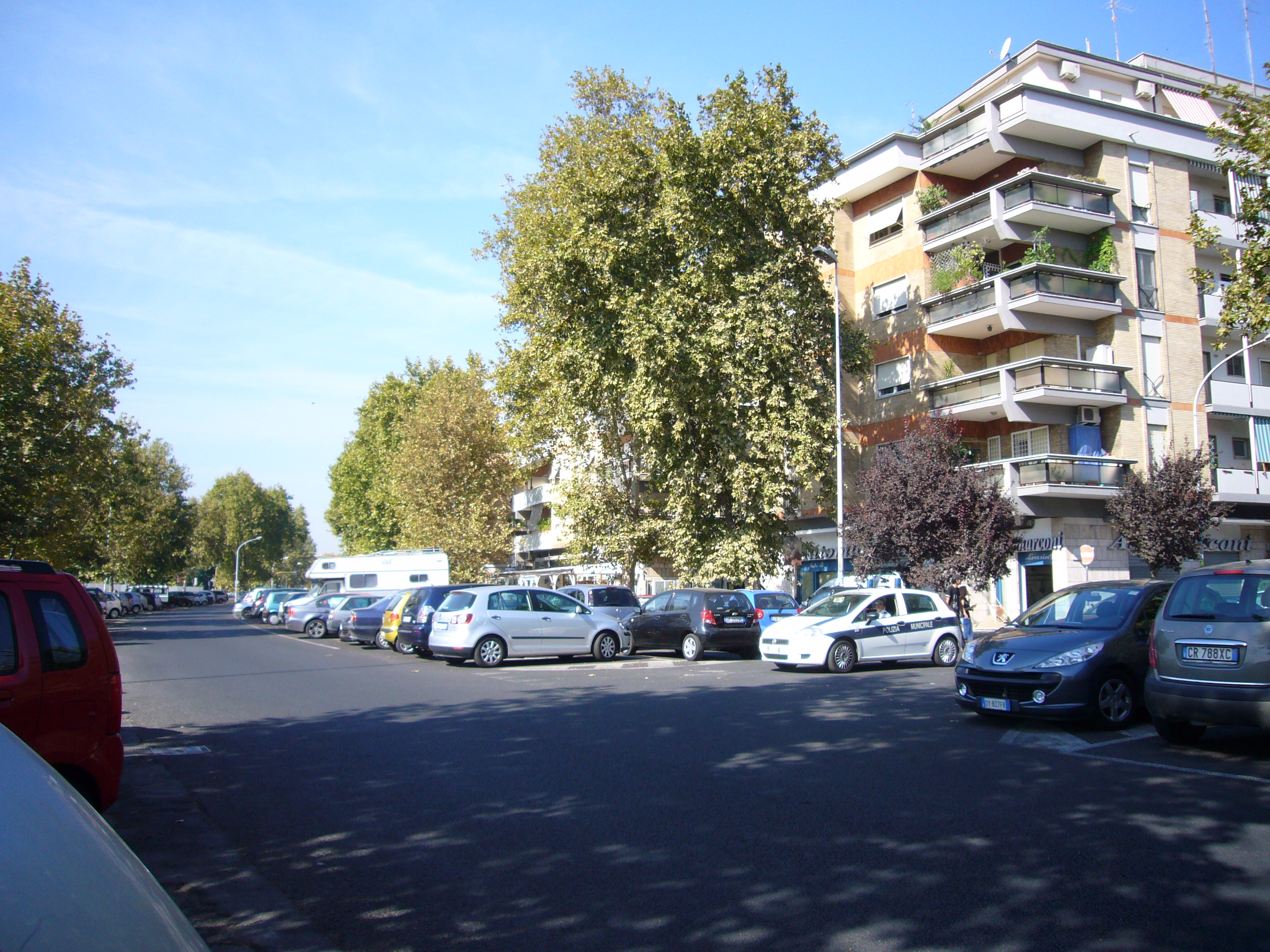
Lungotevere di Pietra Papa towards ponte Marconi

Lungotevere di Pietra Papa is the stretch of the lungotevere that connects Lungotevere Vittorio Gassman to Piazza Augusto Righi, in Rome's Portuense district.

The lungotevere is named after the ancient Via Petra Papae, so named because it was located in the property of the family Papa (or Papareschi); it was established by resolution of the city council of 25 November 1949.

In this area, in 1943, were carried out archaeological excavations that unearthed the remains of baths and various Roman rooms probably what remains of the villa belonging to the Horti Caesaris; found mosaics and frescoes are kept in the National Museum in Rome.

== Sources ==
- Rendina, Claudio; Paradisi, Donatella (2004). Le strade di Roma. 3rd Volume P-Z. Rome: Newton Compton Editori. ISBN 88-541-0210-5.
