= Ponte della Musica-Armando Trovajoli =

Ponte della Musica Armando Trovajoli
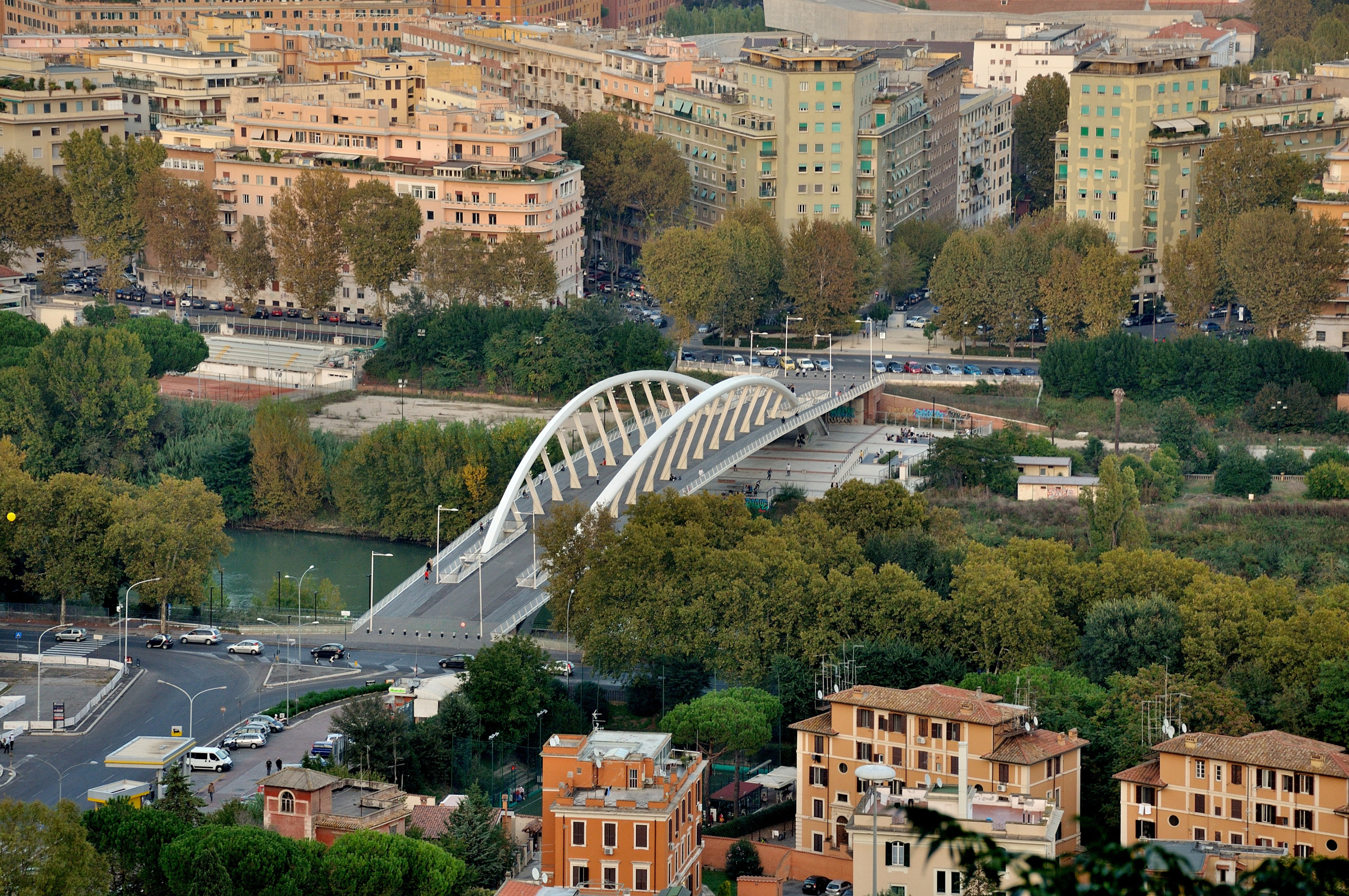
- Coordinates: 41°55′35.4″N 12°27′34.81″E
- Crosses: Tiber
- Locale: Rome, Italy
- Named for: Armando Trovajoli

Characteristics
- Design: Arch bridge
- Material: Steel, reinforced concrete
- Total length: 190 m (620 ft)
- Width: 22 m (72 ft)

History
- Designer: Buro Happold, Kit Powell-Williams Architects

Location
- Interactive map of Ponte della Musica; Armando Trovajoli

The Ponte della Musica-Armando Trovajoli is a bridge in Rome, Italy, that spans the Tiber river between the Della Vittoria and Flaminio quarters of the city. Suspended between the Lungotevere Flaminio and Lungotevere Cadorna, the bridge connects the Parco della Musica auditorium, the Villa Glori park, the MAXXI museum and the Teatro Olimpico with the Foro Italico sports complex, the youth hostel, the Monte Mario green space, the Museo del Genio and the Rai auditorium.

== History ==
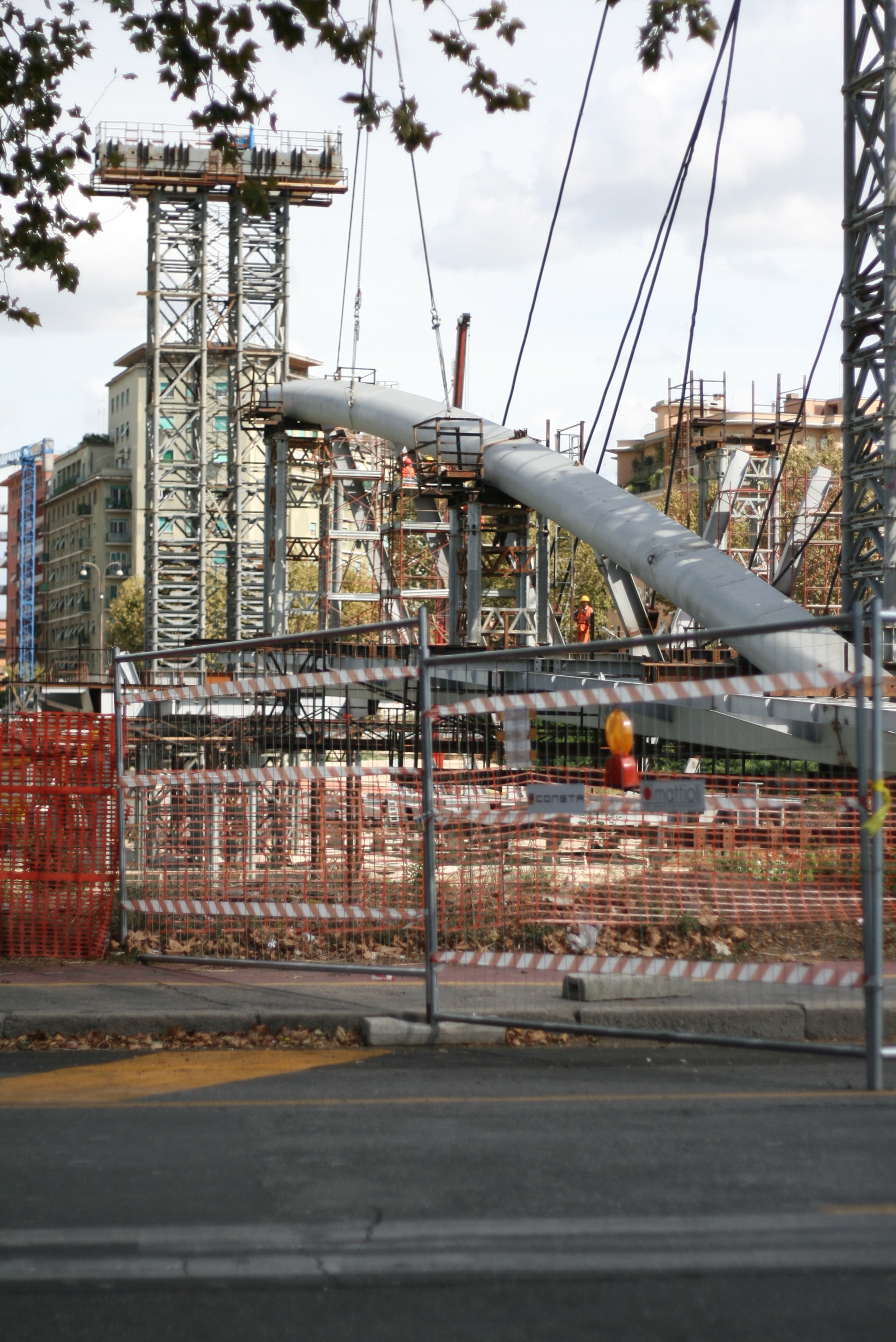
Bridge Construction (2010)

Although the construction of such a work was already foreseen in the 1929 master plan of the capital, it was only after seventy years that the project process was started.

The work was initially conceived for pedestrian use only, and was only later modified to also allow for cycling and eco-friendly public transport, such as electric trams and buses.

Following the death of the Roman composer Armando Trovajoli in February 2013, on 30 May of the same year his name was added to that of the bridge, which thus took on its current name.

== Description ==
The bridge, with a contemporary design, combines different materials in its construction such as steel, reinforced concrete and wood.
