= Lungotevere degli Artigiani =

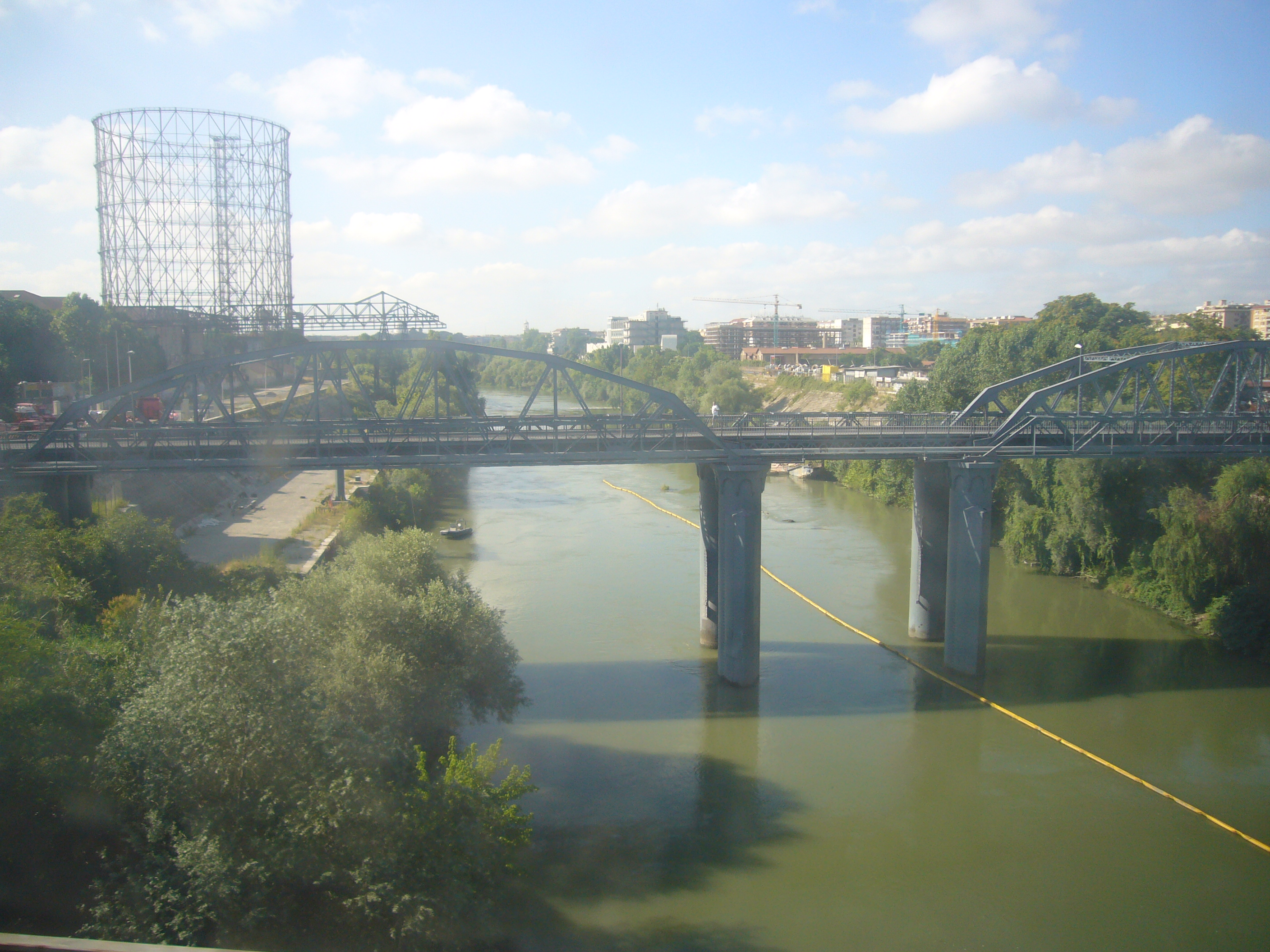
Ponte dell'Industria; to its right, lungotevere degli Artigiani

Lungotevere degli Artigiani is the stretch of the lungotevere linking Ponte Testaccio to via Antonio Pacinotti, in Rome's Portuense district. The lungotevere is named after one of the guilds of the medieval Rome, that of the artisans. The avenue goes under the railway bridge of the Tyrrhenian railway, at the point where the Tiber is crossed by the bridge of Industry.

== Sources ==
- Rendina, Claudio; Paradisi, Donatella (2004). Le strade di Roma. 1st volume A-D. Newton Compton Editori, Rome. ISBN 88-541-0209-1.
