= Lungotevere Marzio =

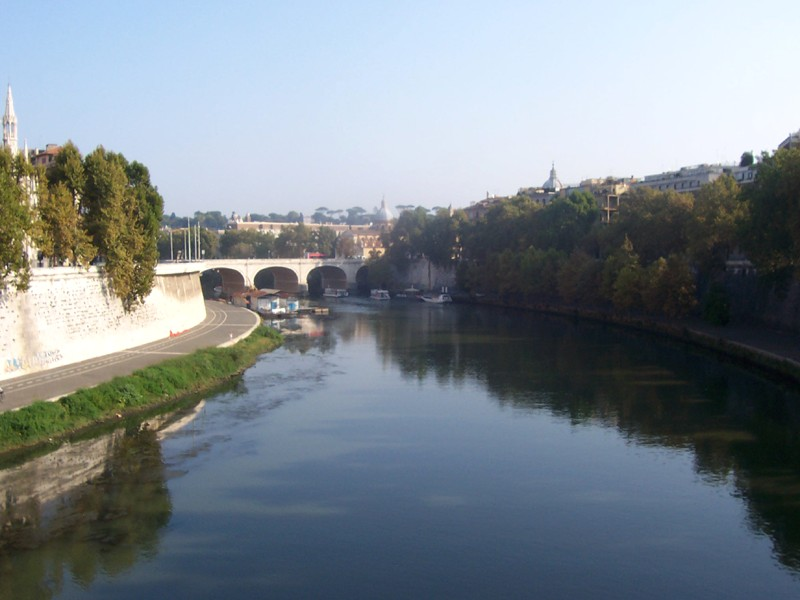
Ponte Cavour; to its right, the lungotevere

Lungotevere Marzio is the stretch of lungotevere in Rome, Italy, that connects Piazza di Ponte Umberto I with Piazza del Porto di Ripetta, in the rioni Campo Marzio and Ponte.

The Lungotevere takes its name from the Campus Martius, an area dedicated to the god Mars; was established by resolution of 20 July 1887.

The lungotevere is located between the ponte Umberto I and ponte Cavour; it has some fine buildings, like the Borghese cottage, designed by Filippo Galassi and built in 1886, a palace built by Cesare Valle in 1932 and the first example of rationalist architecture in the residential field in the city, the facade of the Bonanni house designed by the architects Ernesto and Gaetano Rapisardi in 1933.

== Sources ==
- Rendina, Claudio; Paradisi, Donatella (2004). Le strade di Roma. 2nd volume E-O. Newton Compton Editori, Rome. ISBN 88-541-0209-1.
