= Lungotevere Guglielmo Oberdan =

Coordinates: 41°55′13″N 12°28′09″E

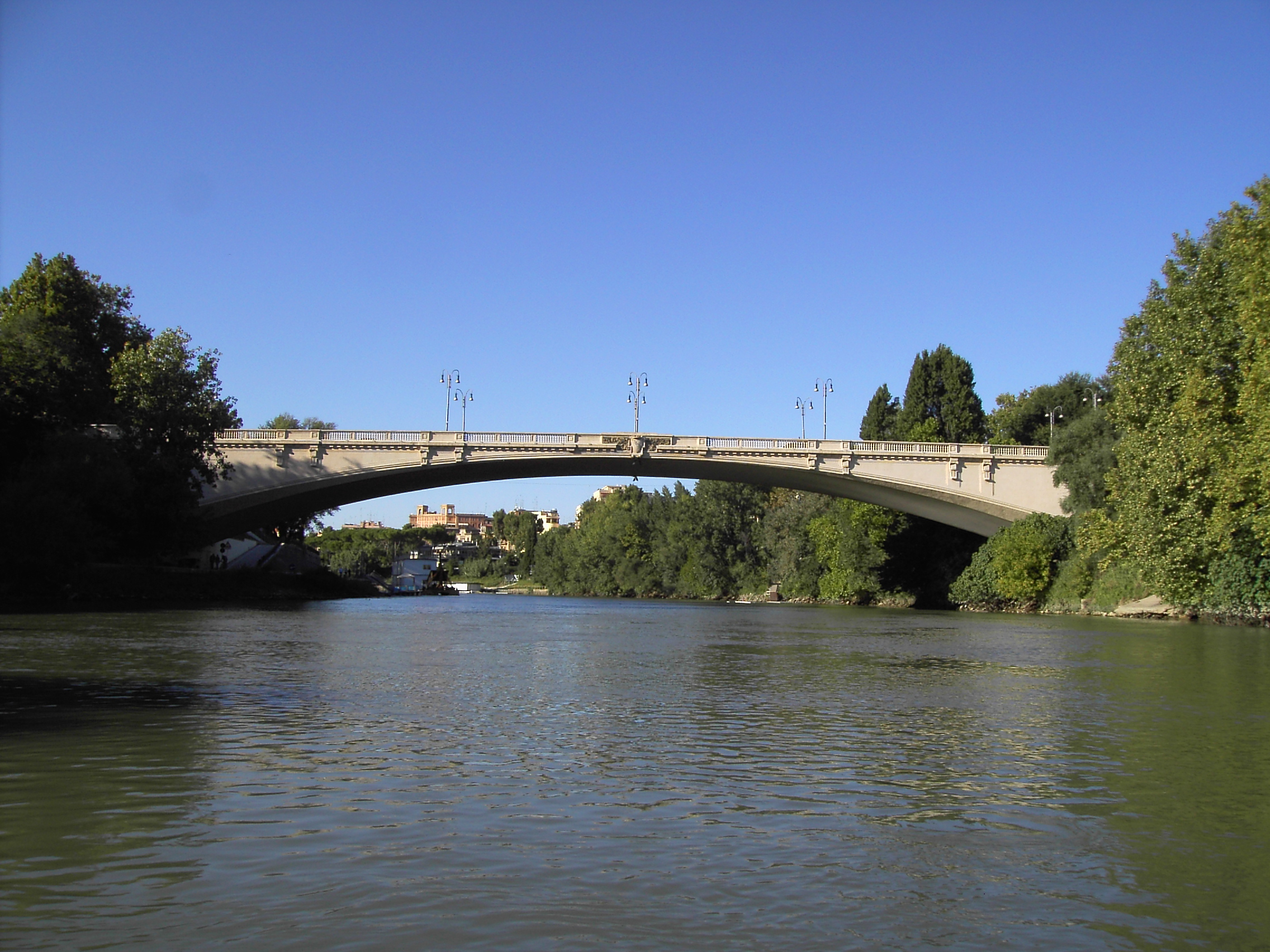
Ponte del Risorgimento; on the left, the stairs of Lungotevere Guglielmo Oberdan

Lungotevere Guglielmo Oberdan is the stretch of Lungotevere that links Piazza Monte Grappa to Piazza del Fante in Rome (Italy), in the Della Vittoria quarter.

The Lungotevere is dedicated to the irredentist patriot Guglielmo Oberdan from Trieste, who deserted the Austrian army and was hanged after his attempt to murder Franz Joseph I of Austria.

The Lungotevere was established as per Governor resolution on December 19, 1940.

The Lungotevere is nearby the Ponte del Risorgimento; in the surroundings (Piazza Monte Grappa) rises the Convitto Nazionale Vittorio Emanuele II.

== Sources ==
- Rendina, Claudio; Paradisi, Donatella. Le strade di Roma. Volume secondo E-O (2004 ed.). Newton Compton Editori, Rome. ISBN 88-541-0209-1.
