= Lungotevere Ripa =

- Interactive map of Lungotevere Ripa
- Namesake: Latin word ripa (bank)
- Type: Lungotevere
- Location: Rome, Italy
- Quarter: Trastevere
- Coordinates: 41.8864°N 12.4795°E
- From: Ponte Palatino
- To: Port of Ripa Grande

Construction
- Inauguration: July 20, 1887

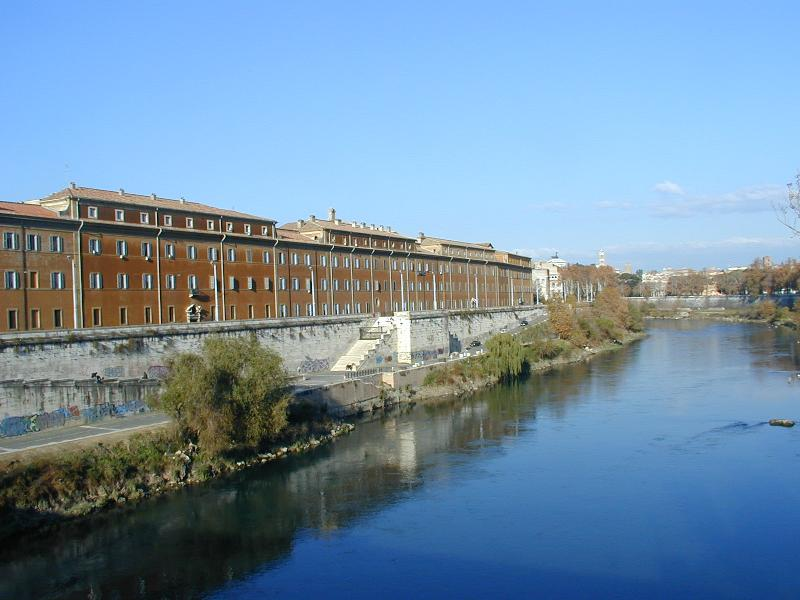
Lungotevere Ripa, overlooked by the complex of San Michele a Ripa

Lungotevere Ripa is the stretch of Lungotevere that links Ponte Palatino to the Port of Ripa Grande in Rome (Italy), in the Rione Trastevere.

The Lungotevere takes its name from the Latin word ripa, meaning "bank" (the toponym also applies to the neighboring Rione, that nevertheless lies on the other side of the Tiber and whose Lungotevere is called Lungotevere Aventino); it has been established as per deliberation dated July 20, 1887.

The stretch of Lungotevere between Via del Porto and Piazza di Porta Portese corresponds to the Port of Ripa Grande, formerly the greatest river port of Rome, that was destroyed during the building of the muraglioni (massive walls). It houses the Ospizio di San Michele a Ripa Grande.

== Bibliography ==
- Rendina, Claudio; Paradisi, Donatella (2004). Le strade di Roma. 3rd Volume P-Z. Rome: Newton Compton Editori. ISBN 88-541-0210-5.
