= Lungotevere degli Inventori =

Street in Rome, Italy

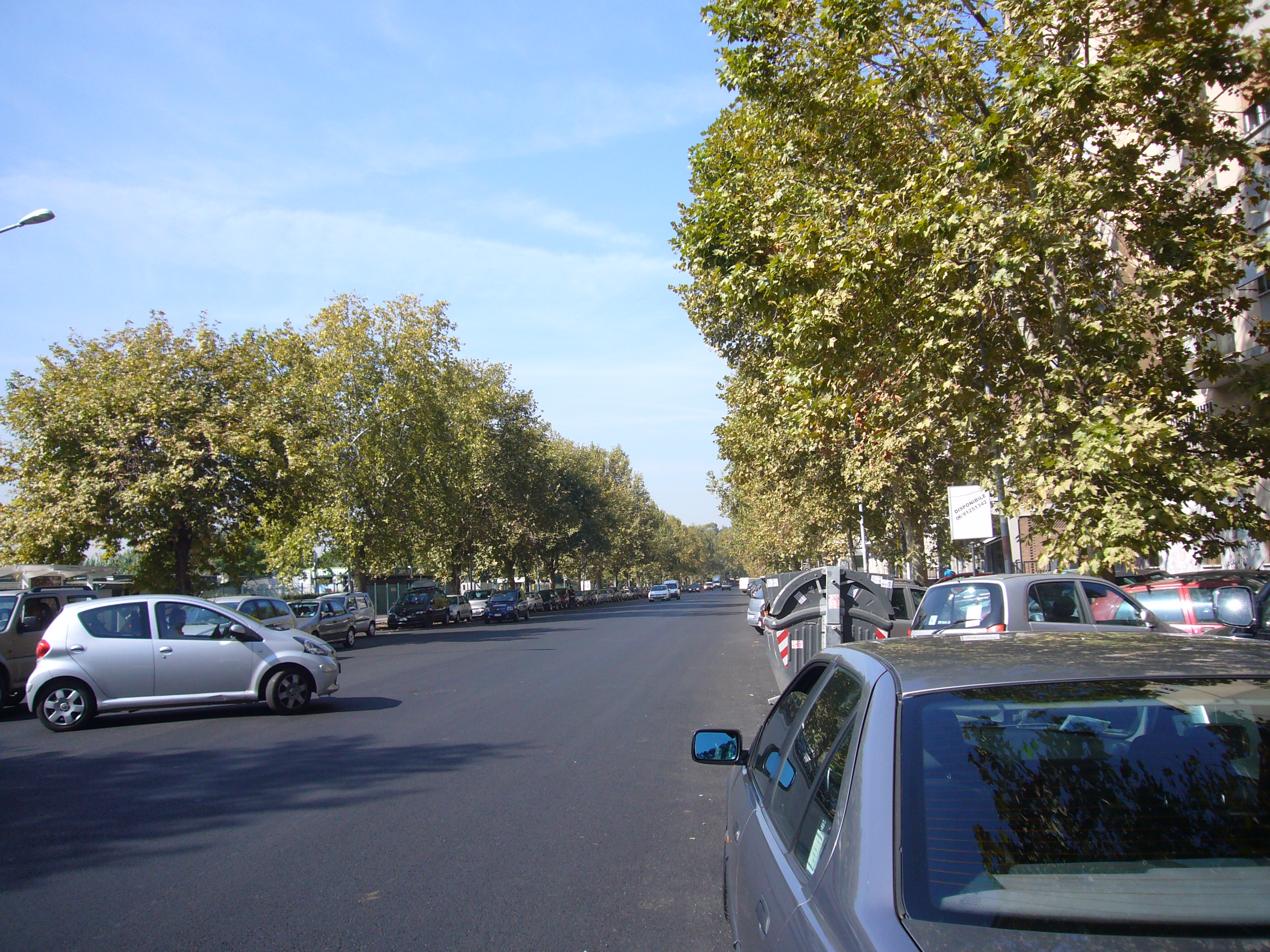
Lungotevere degli Inventori from ponte Marconi

Lungotevere degli Inventori is the stretch of lungotevere linking piazza Augusto Righi with piazza Antonio Meucci, in Rome, Portuense district.

This lungotevere gets its name from the toponomastic of this zone, dedicated to various scientists and inventors; it was created with law of Rome's governor on 12 december 1940.

== Sources ==
- Rendina, Claudio; Paradisi, Donatella (2004). Le strade di Roma. Volume secondo E-O. Rome: Newton Compton Editori. ISBN 88-541-0209-1.
