= Lungotevere Dante =

Lungotevere Dante is the stretch of lungotevere linking Viale Guglielmo Marconi with Ponte Marconi, in Rome, in the Ostiense district.

Dedicated to the Florentine poet Dante Alighieri, it is located near some locations of the campus of the university Roma Tre and the Institute for Cinema and Television.

On either side of the Tiber, also they have home dozens of fields and sports clubs.

The lungotevere was established by resolution of the council of 15 July 1965.

This is the southernmost part of the lungotevere on the left bank.

== Sources ==
- Rendina, Claudio; Paradisi, Donatella (2004). Le strade di Roma. First volume A-D. Rome: Newton Compton Editori. ISBN 88-541-0208-3.
