= Lungotevere Vittorio Gassman =

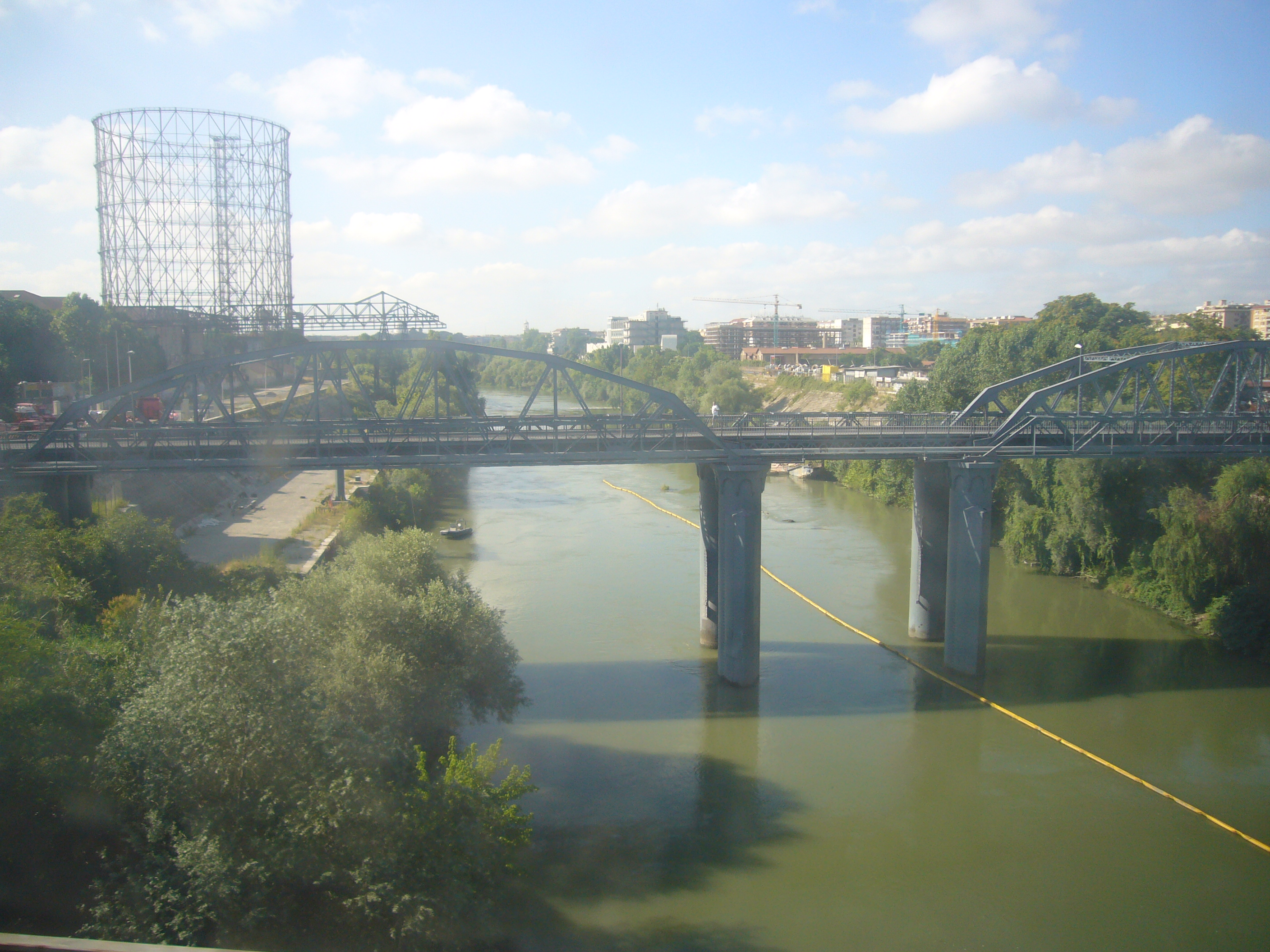
Ponte dell'Industria; to the right, the lungotevere Gassman

Lungotevere Vittorio Gassman, previously named Lungotevere Papareschi, is the stretch of lungotevere that connects via Antonio Pacinotti to via Pietro Blaserna, in Rome's Portuense district.

The lungotevere is dedicated to the Genoese actor and director Vittorio Gassman, born in 1922, who moved as a young man in Rome and died there in 2000; it was established and named by resolution of the City Council of 29 December 2006. Previously the Lungotevere took its name from the noble Papareschi (also de Papa or Paparoni) Roman medieval family.

== Sources ==
- Rendina, Claudio; Paradisi, Donatella (2004). Le strade di Roma. 3rd Volume P-Z. Rome: Newton Compton Editori. ISBN 88-541-0210-5.
