= Lungotevere Della Vittoria =

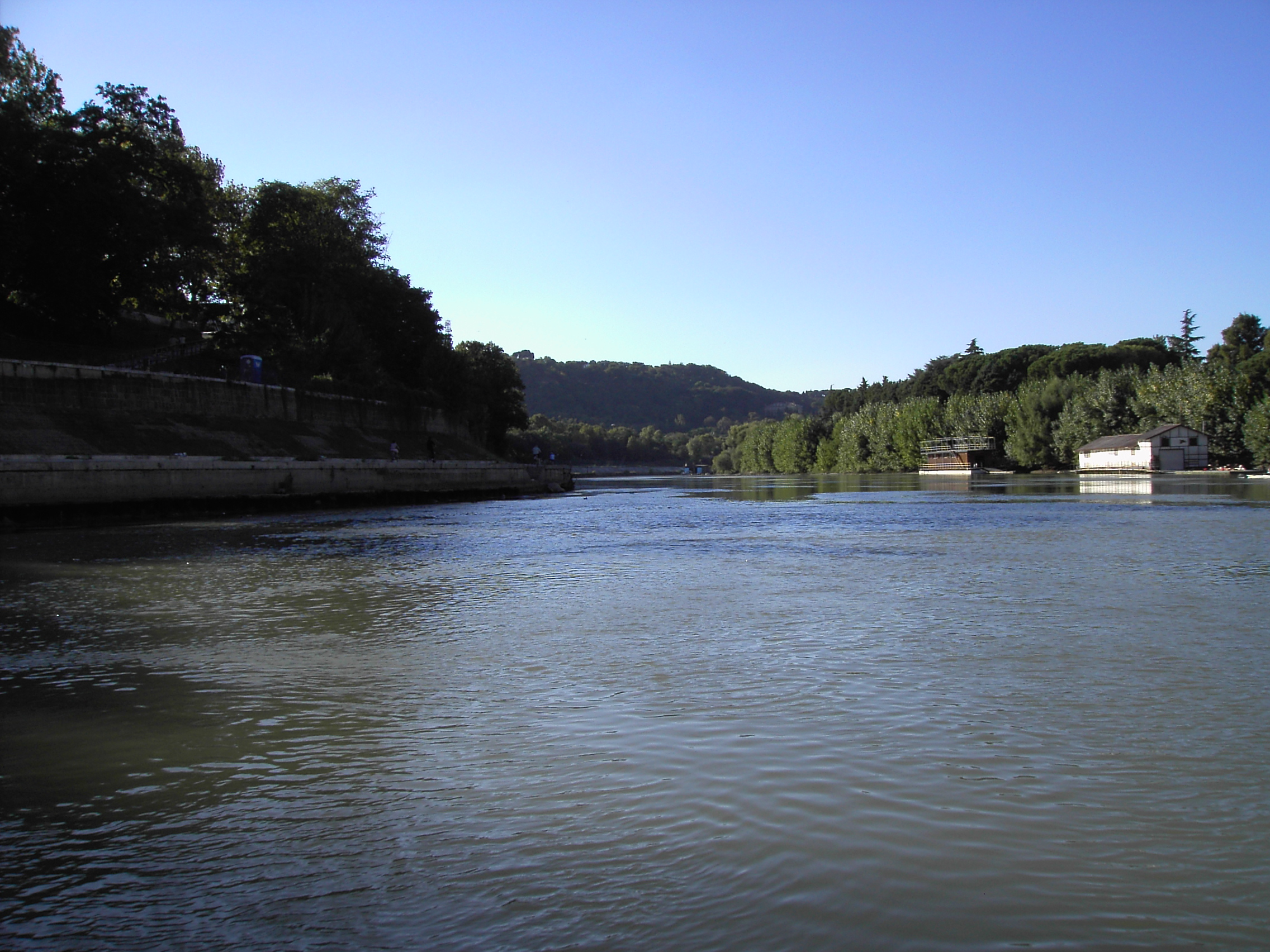
Lungotevere Della Vittoria (on the left)

Lungotevere Della Vittoria is the stretch of Lungotevere that links Piazzale Maresciallo Giardino to Piazza del Fante in Rome (Italy), in the Della Vittoria quarter.

The Lungotevere is dedicated to the Italian victory in the World War I (the toponym was bestowed to the whole quarter); it was first established as per Governor resolution on June 12, 1939; the year after it was suppressed and was established again as per City Council resolution on February 25, 1948.

The boulevard hosts the museum of the Istituto Storico e di Cultura dell'Arma del Genio, whose edifice was built in 1940, and the Associazione Fondo Alberto Moravia, established on December 16, 1991, in the house where the writer Alberto Moravia lived.

== Bibliography ==
- Rendina, Claudio; Paradisi, Donatella. Le strade di Roma. 3rd volume P-Z (2004 ed.). Newton Compton Editori, Rome. ISBN 88-541-0210-5.
