= Lungotevere dei Vallati =

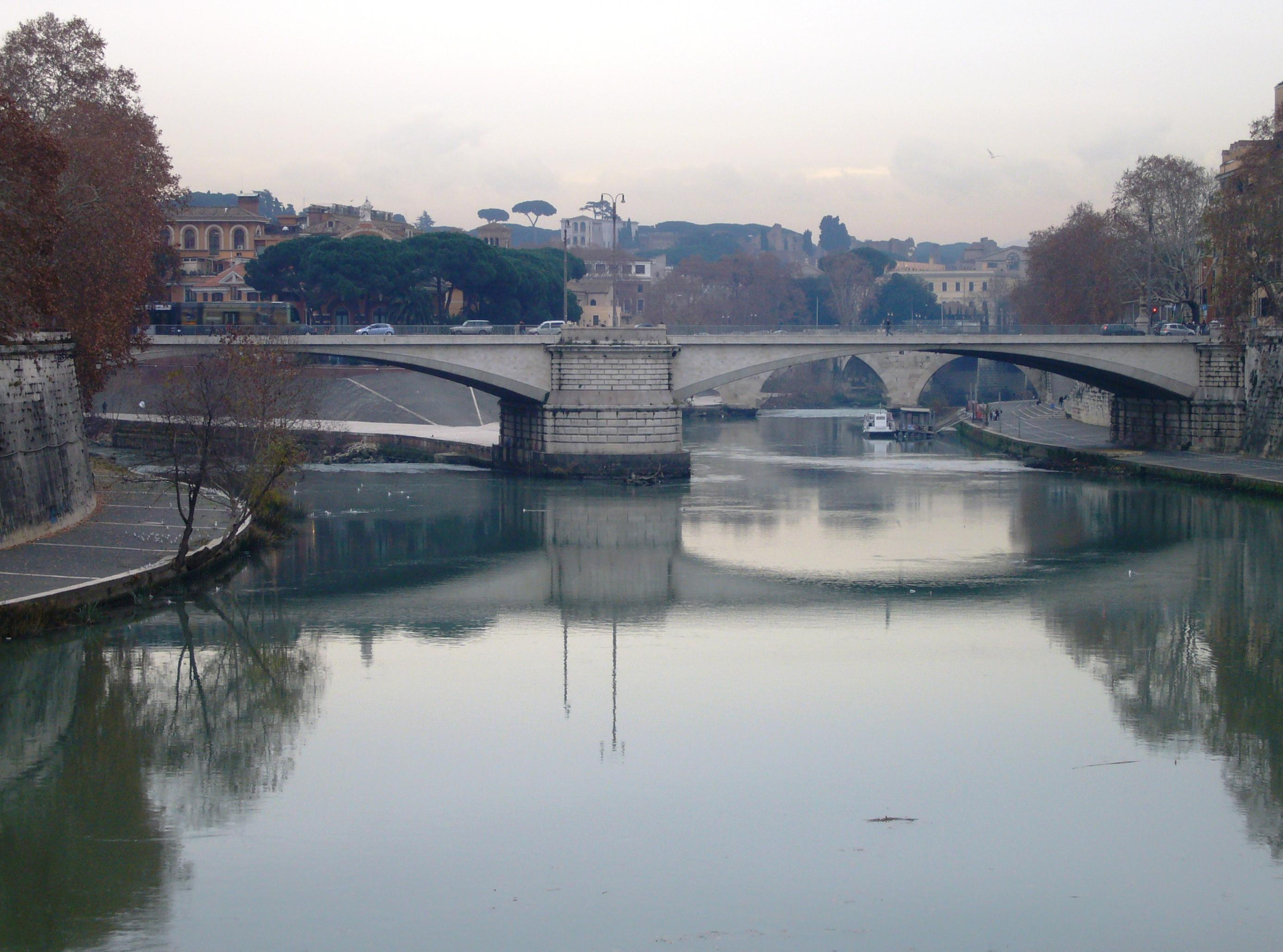
Ponte Garibaldi; to the left, the Lungotevere

Lungotevere dei Vallati is the part of the lungotevere connecting Piazza San Vincenzo Pallotti and Ponte Sisto to Via Arenula and Ponte Garibaldi in Rome, in the rione Regola.

The Lungotevere is dedicated to the Vallati, an ancient and noble Roman family; it was established by resolution of 20 July 1887.

There lies the villino Scafi, designed by Filippo Galassi and realized in 1886.

== Sources ==
- Rendina, Claudio; Paradisi, Donatella (2004). Le strade di Roma. 3rd volume P-Z. Newton Compton Editori, Rome. ISBN 88-541-0209-1.
