= Lungotevere Portuense =

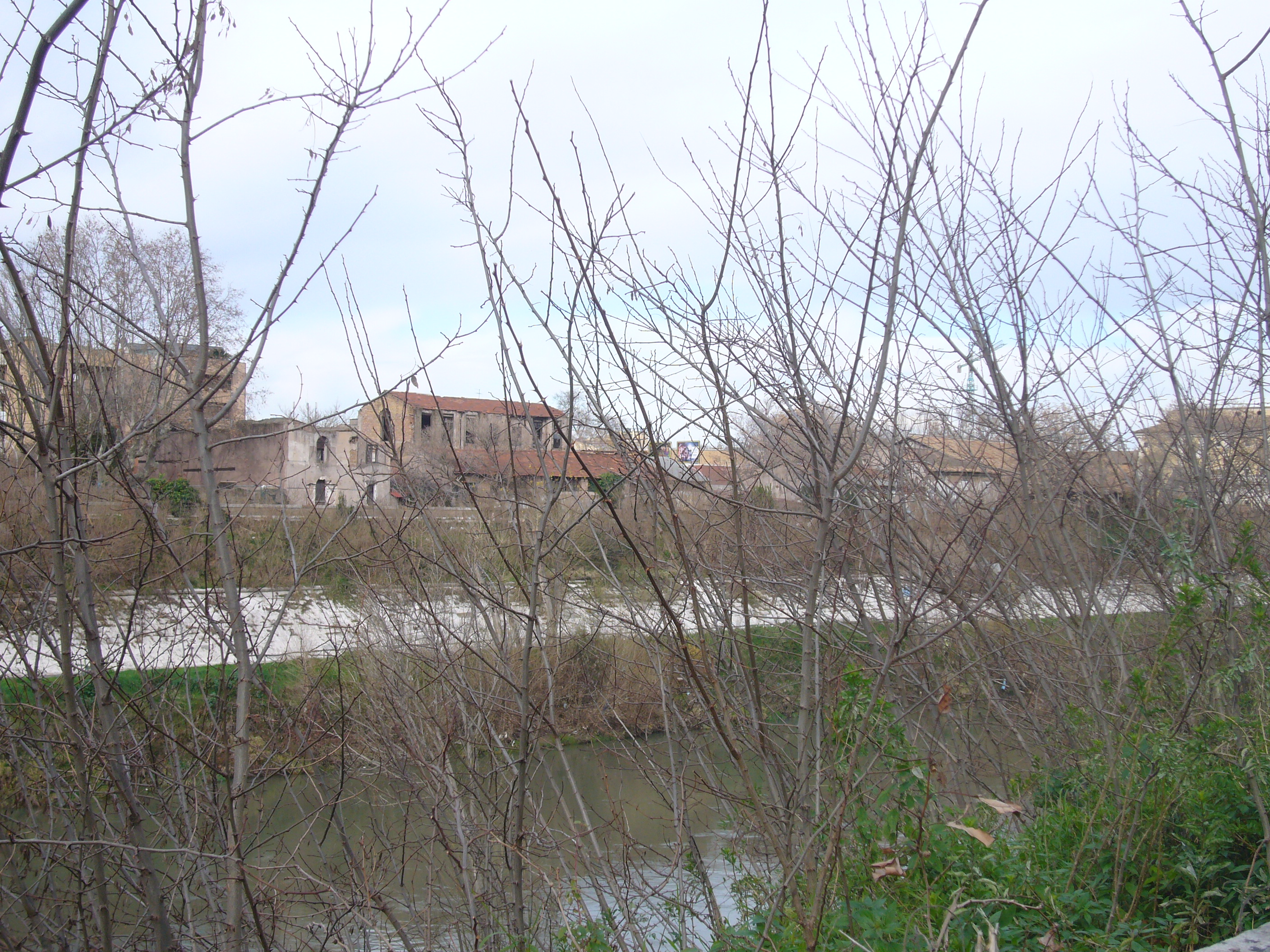
Lungotevere Portuense as seen from Testaccio

Lungotevere Portuense is the stretch of Lungotevere that links Ponte Sublicio to Ponte Testaccio in Rome (Italy), in the Portuense Quarter.

The Lungotevere takes its name from the ancient Via Portuensis, that led to the city of Portus; it has been established as per Deliberation dated July 20, 1887.

It houses the Papal Arsenal of Ripa Grande, a former boatyard of the Papal Navy, as well as the remains of the 16th-century Villa della Porta Rodiani: the gate is a little structure attributed to Girolamo Rainaldi.

== Bibliography ==
- Rendina, Claudio; Paradisi, Donatella (2004). Le strade di Roma. 3rd Volume P-Z. Rome: Newton Compton Editori. ISBN 88-541-0210-5.
