= Lungotevere Raffaello Sanzio =

Street in Rome, Italy

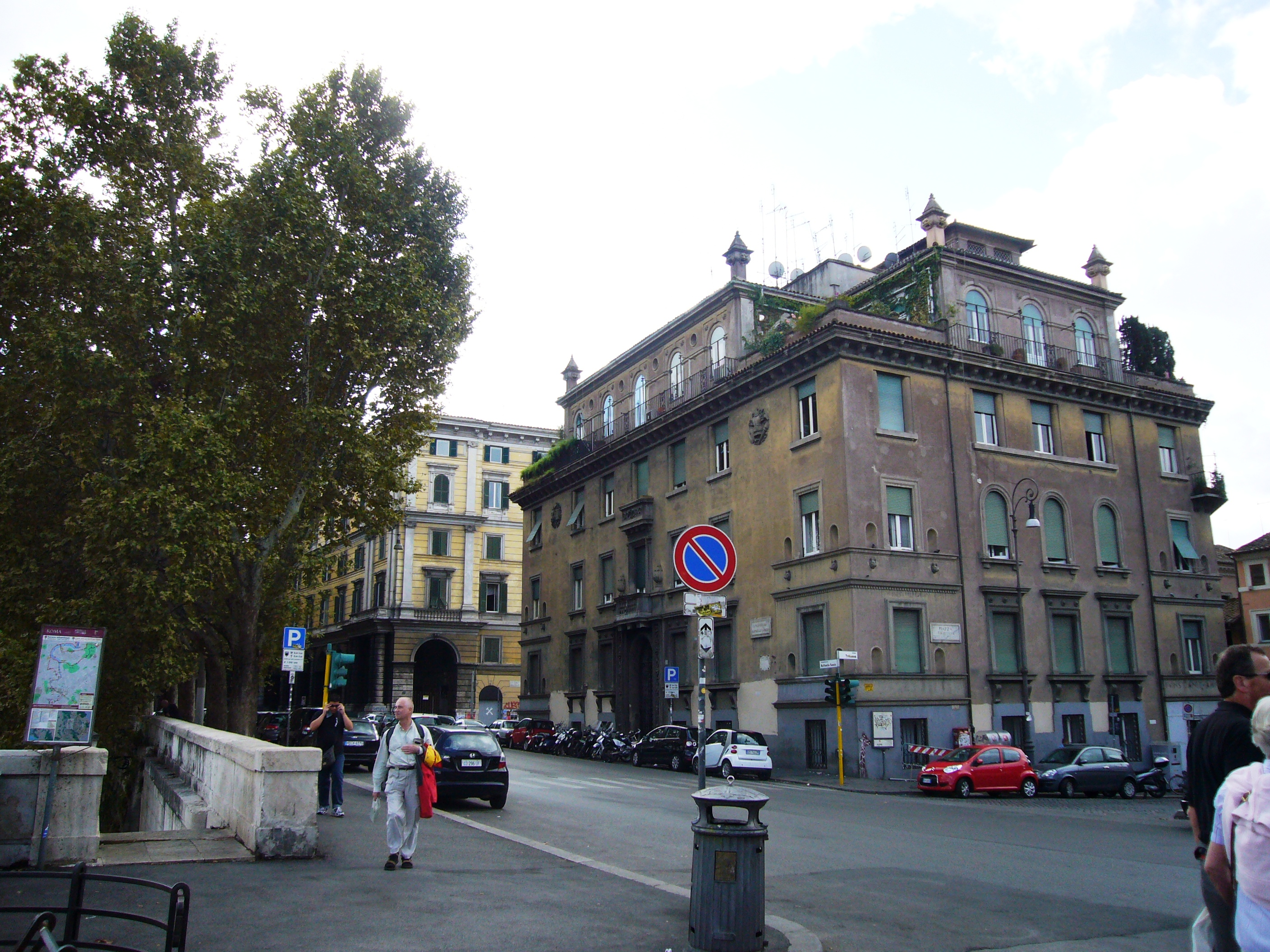
Lungotevere Raffaello Sanzio

Lungotevere Raffaello Sanzio is the stretch of Lungotevere that links Ponte Sisto to Ponte Garibaldi in Rome (Italy), in the Rione Trastevere.

The Lungotevere is dedicated to the artist Raffaello Sanzio from Urbino, the author of many works of art within the Capitoline city; it was established as per deliberation of the City Council dated January 24, 1956.

== Bibliography ==
- Rendina, Claudio; Paradisi, Donatella (2004). Le strade di Roma. 3rd Volume P-Z. Rome: Newton Compton Editori. ISBN 88-541-0210-5.
