= Lungotevere della Magliana =

Lungotevere della Magliana is the stretch of the urban road along the Tiber that connects via del Ponte della Magliana to via della Magliana, in Rome's Portuense district.

The lungotevere is named after Magliana, which is a place and estate in the outskirts of Rome, formerly owned by the ancient Roman gens of the Manilii (or Manlia), and famous for the hunting parties given there by Pope Leo X (r. 1513–21) during the Renaissance.

The name of the road was established by resolution of the city council of 19 February 1971. This is the southernmost part of the lungotevere of the Tiber's right bank.

== Bibliografia ==
- Rendina, Claudio; Paradisi, Donatella (2004). Le strade di Roma. Volume secondo E-O. Rome: Newton Compton Editori. ISBN 88-541-0209-1.
