= Lungotevere Maresciallo Diaz =

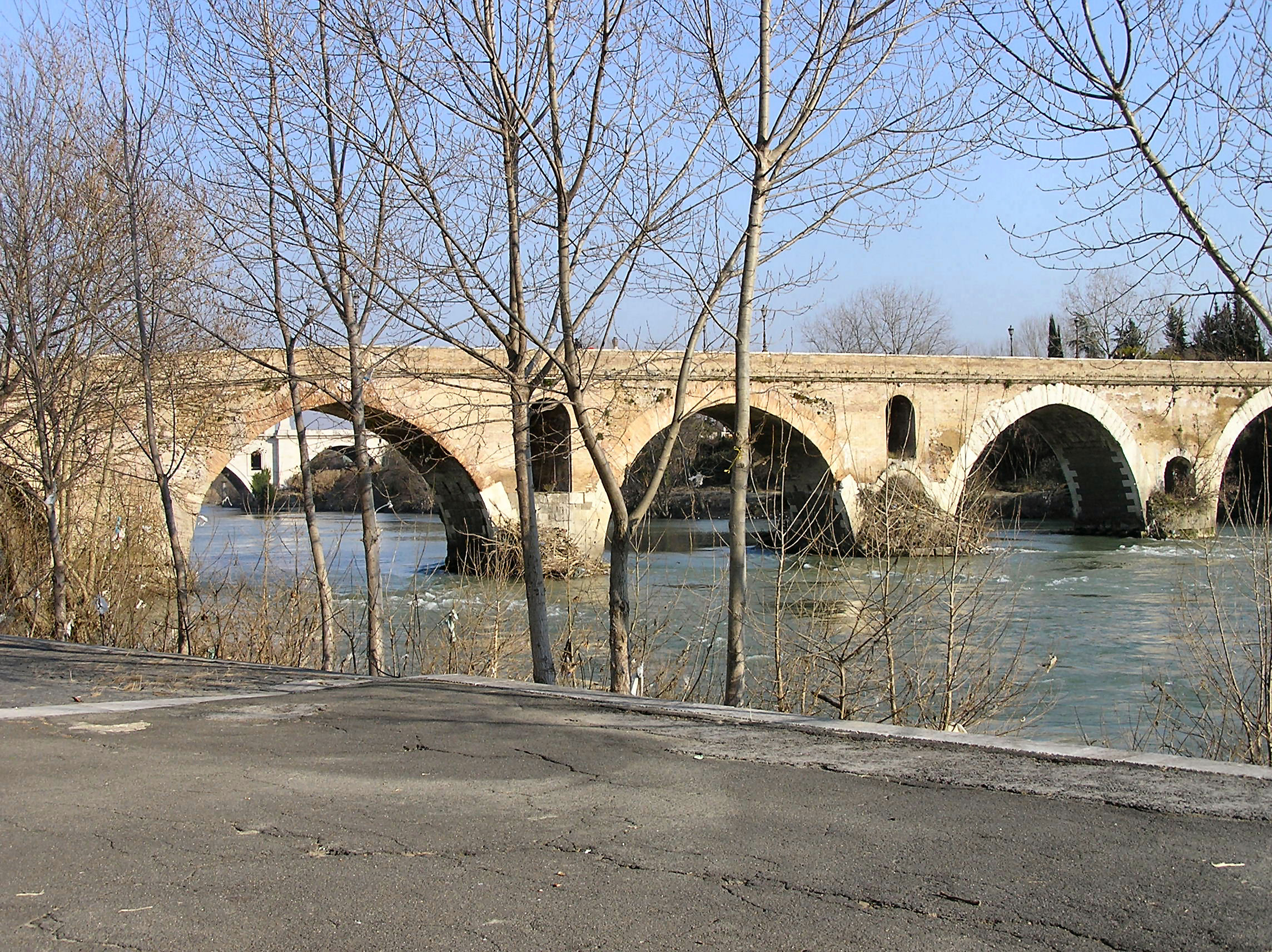
Ponte Milvio seen from the Lungotevere

The Lungotevere Maresciallo Diaz is the stretch of Lungotevere that links Piazza Lauro De Bosis to Piazzale di Ponte Milvio, in Rome (Italy), in the Quarter Della Vittoria.

The Lungotevere is dedicated to the Marshal of Italy Armando Diaz, Chief of Staff during World War I and Minister of Defence in the first fascist cabinet; it was established as per Governor resolution on March 8, 1937.

The Lungotevere lies in the area of the Foro Italico (formerly Foro Mussolini) and hosts the Foresteria Nord, an edifice designed by Costantino Costantini and built in 1933 in line with the Foresteria Sud; they were both conceived during the realisation of the Foro Italico; the two buildings served as guest quarters.

The boulevard reaches Ponte Milvio; it is the northeast section of the Lungotevere on the right bank of river Tiber.

== Bibliography ==
- Rendina, Claudio; Paradisi, Donatella (2007). Le strade di Roma. 2nd volume E-O (2004 ed.). Newton Compton Editori, Rome. ISBN 978-88-541-0209-5.
