= Lungotevere Grande Ammiraglio Thaon di Revel =

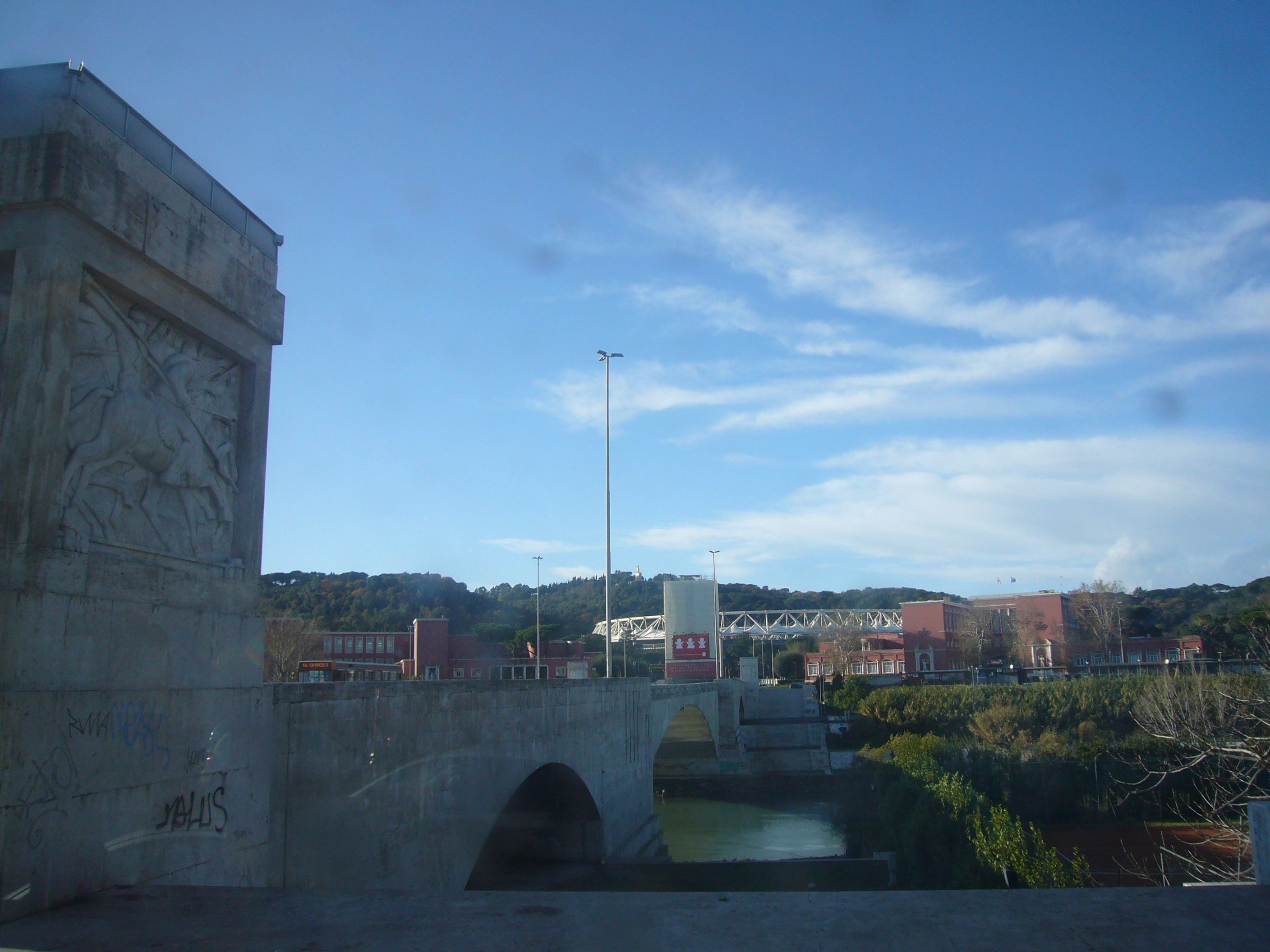
ponte Duca d'Aosta seen from lungotevere

Lungotevere Grande Ammiraglio Thaon di Revel (official name: lungotevere Grande A.glio Thaon di Revel) is the stretch of lungotevere which links ponte Duca d'Aosta to the via Flaminia, in Rome, quarter Flaminio.

Dedicated to the torinese grand admiral Paolo Emilio Thaon di Revel, Chief of the Marina Militare during World War I, duca del Mare, Minister of the Navy and president of Senate (1943-1944), it was instituted with the decision of the city council of 24 January 1956.

It runs between ponte Duca d'Aosta and ponte Milvio, in front of the Foro Italico.

== Sources ==
- Rendina, Claudio; Paradisi, Donatella (2004). Le strade di Roma. 2nd volume E-O. Newton Compton Editori, Rome. ISBN 88-541-0209-1.
