= Lungotevere di San Paolo =

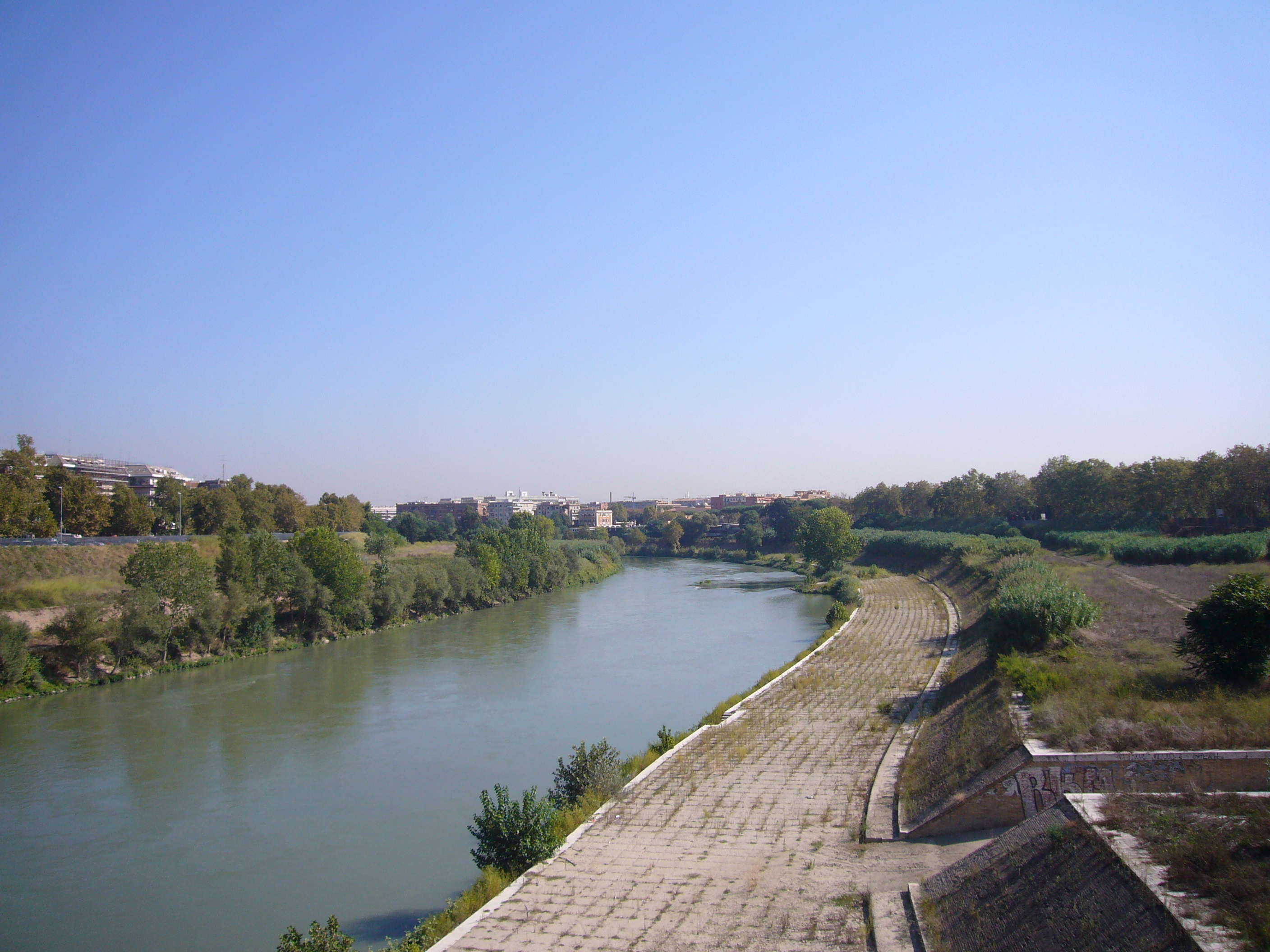
Lungotevere di San Paolo

Lungotevere di San Paolo (official name: Lungotevere di S. Paolo) is the stretch of Lungotevere that connects via Ostiense to Piazza Tommaso Edison, in Rome, in the Ostiense district.

The Lungotevere is named after the nearby basilica of St. Paul Outside the Walls, one of the four papal basilicas; it was established by resolution of the city council of 25 February 1948.

== Sources ==
- Rendina, Claudio; Paradisi, Donatella (2004). Le strade di Roma. 3rd volume P-Z. Newton Compton Editori, Rome. ISBN 88-541-0209-1.
