= Lungotevere Castello =

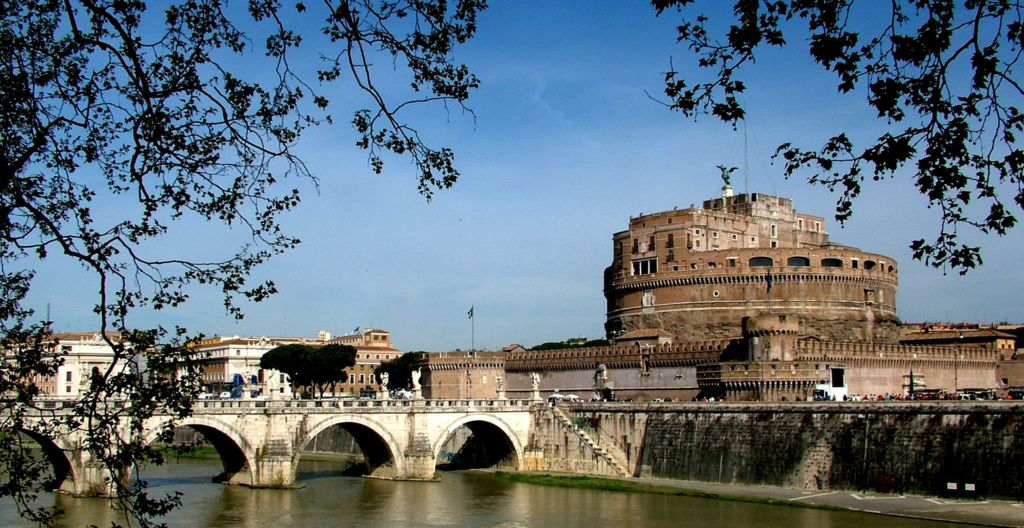
Castel Sant'Angelo and the Lungotevere

Lungotevere Castello is the stretch of Lungotevere that links Piazza di Ponte Sant'Angelo to Piazza dei Tribunali, in Rome (Italy), in the rioni Borgo and Prati.

The Lungotevere takes its name from the Mausoleum of Hadrian, better known as Castel Sant'Angelo, erected by Emperor Hadrian between 134 and 139.

Several churches, then demolished or no more existing, formerly rose in the area: among them, Sant'Antonio della Mole Adriana, Sant'Angelo de Castro Sancti Angeli, the Chapel of the Holy Rosary and San Tommaso de Castro Sancti Angeli.

In the environs of the castle there was an estate, called Arenaccio (Italian for "Bad Strand") due to the vicinity to the strand of river Tiber: it was employed for military and circus performances.

== Bibliography ==
- Rendina, Claudio; Paradisi, Donatella (2004). Le strade di Roma. First volume A-D. Rome: Newton Compton Editori. ISBN 88-541-0208-3.
