= Ponte Giacomo Matteotti =

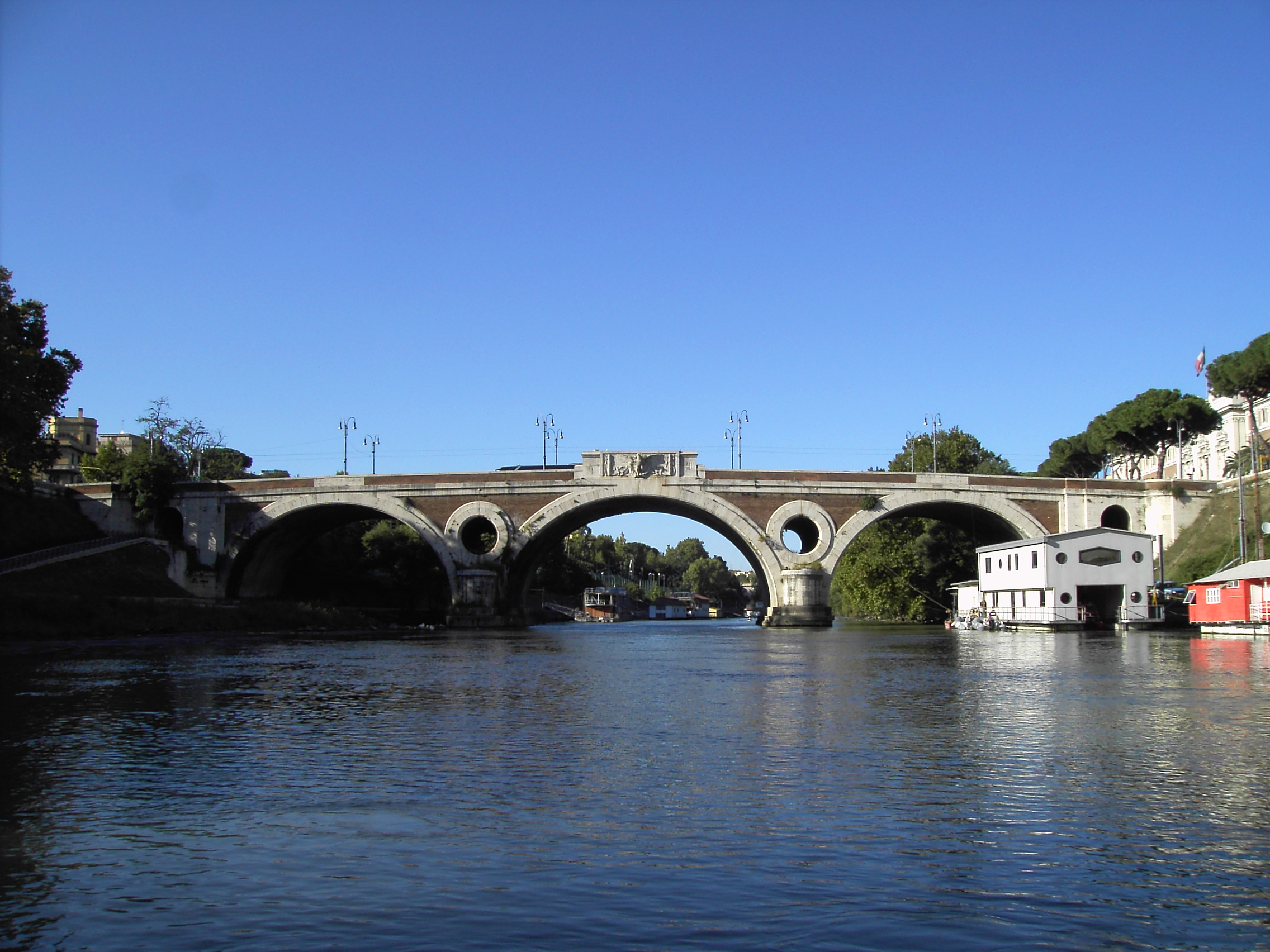
- Ponte Giacomo Matteotti, Rome
- Coordinates: 41°54′52″N 12°28′15″E
- Crosses: River Tiber
- Locale: Rome, Rione Prati, Quarters Flaminio and Della Vittoria, Italy

Characteristics
- Material: Brickwall
- Total length: 138.6 m (454.7 ft)
- Width: 20.1 m (65.9 ft)

History
- Designer: Augusto Antonelli
- Construction start: 1924
- Construction end: 1929
- Opened: April 21, 1929

Location
- Interactive map of Ponte Giacomo Matteotti

Ponte Giacomo Matteotti (or briefly Ponte Matteotti), formerly Ponte del Littorio, is a bridge that links Lungotevere Arnaldo da Brescia to Piazza delle Cinque Giornate in Rome (Italy), in the Rione Prati and in the Flaminio and Della Vittoria quarters.

== Description ==
The bridge, designed by Augusto Antonelli with the name Ponte delle Milizie, was begun in 1924 and completed five years after; it was inaugurated on April 21, 1929 as Ponte del Littorio.

After World War II it was dedicated to the socialist politician Giacomo Matteotti, who was kidnapped nearby.

The bridge has three brickwork arches and is 138.6 m (454.7 ft) long.

== Bibliography ==
- Rendina, Claudio. Enciclopedia di Roma (2005 ed.). Newton Compton Editori, Rome. ISBN 88-541-0304-7.
