= Lungotevere Flaminio =

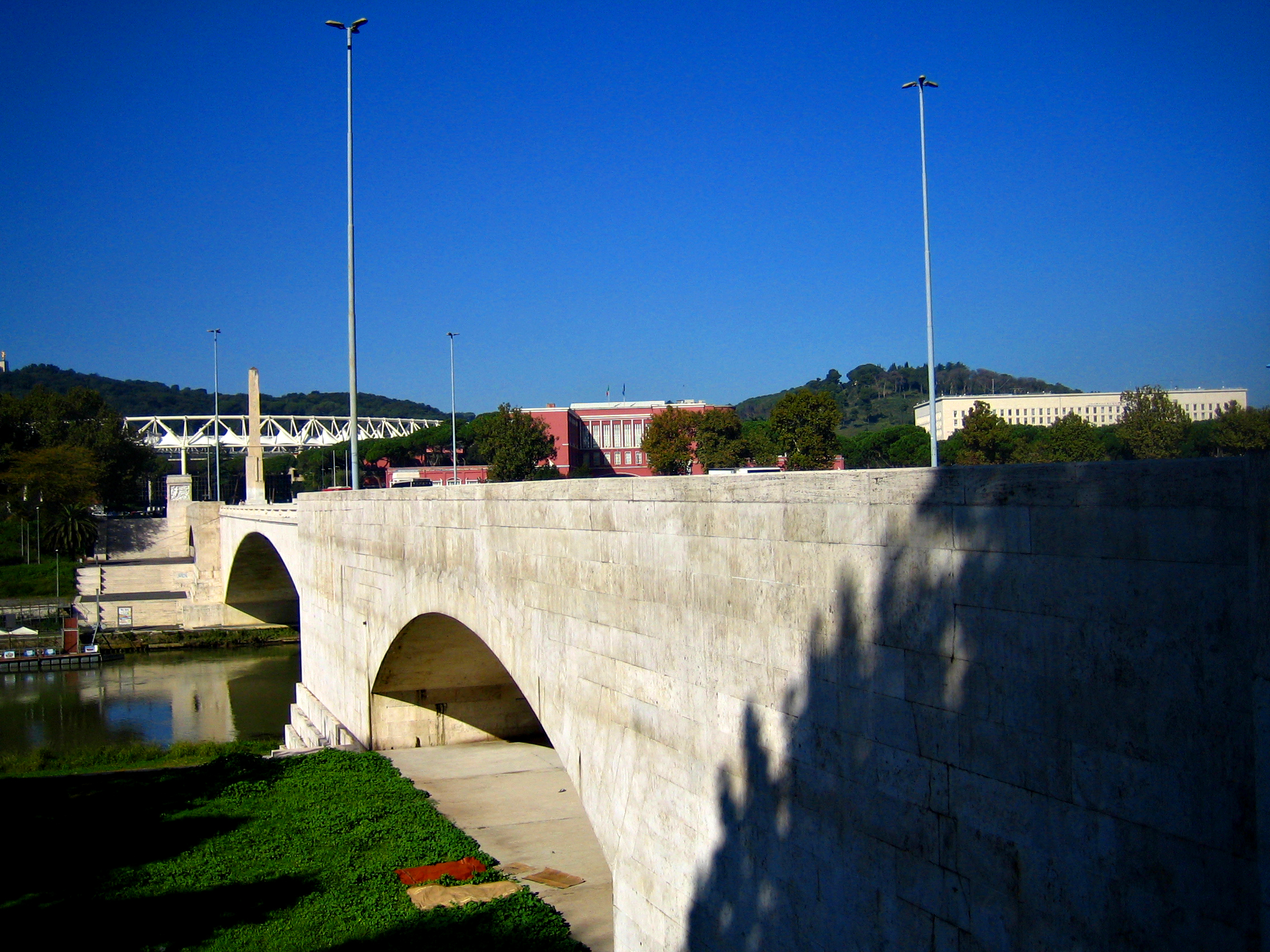
Ponte Duca d'Aosta seen from the Lungotevere

Lungotevere Flaminio is the stretch of Lungotevere that links Piazzale delle Belle Arti to Ponte Duca d'Aosta in Rome, in the Flaminio quarter.

It is a large boulevard characterized by some old apartment houses and sport complexes along the river Tiber (among which the Fondazione Cavalieri di Colombo, designed by Ernesto Lapadula in 1938).

Among the various apartment houses on the Lungotevere, one of the most eminent of the whole town is the Palazzina Furmanik, built between 1941 and 1942 after a design by Mario De Renzi, notable for its embossed loggias all over the main façade.

== Sources ==
- Rendina, Claudio; Paradisi, Donatella (2007). Le strade di Roma. 2nd volume E-O (2004 ed.). Newton Compton Editori, Rome. ISBN 978-88-541-0209-5.
