= Lungotevere Aventino =

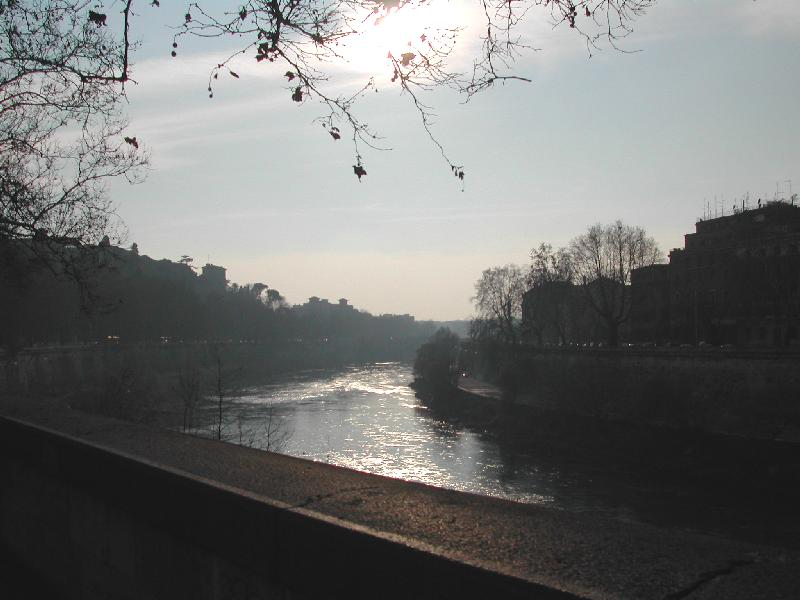
- The Tiber; to the left, the Aventine Hill and the lungotevere
- Interactive map of Lungotevere Aventino
- Location: Rome, Italy
- Quarter: Ripa
- From: Ponte Palatino
- To: Piazza dell'Emporio

Lungotevere Aventino is the part of the lungotevere connecting the ponte Palatino to Piazza dell'Emporio, in Rome, in the rione Ripa.

The Lungotevere corresponds to the slopes of Cermalus, the area of the Palatine Hill under which, according to legend, Romulus and Remus were picked from the waters of the Tiber, after being abandoned in a basket.

Above the Lungotevere are situated two parks, Sant'Alessio and the Parco Savello.

== Sources ==
- Rendina, Claudio; Paradisi, Donatella (2004). Le strade di Roma. First volume A-D. Rome: Newton Compton Editori. ISBN 88-541-0208-3.
