= Ponte del Risorgimento =

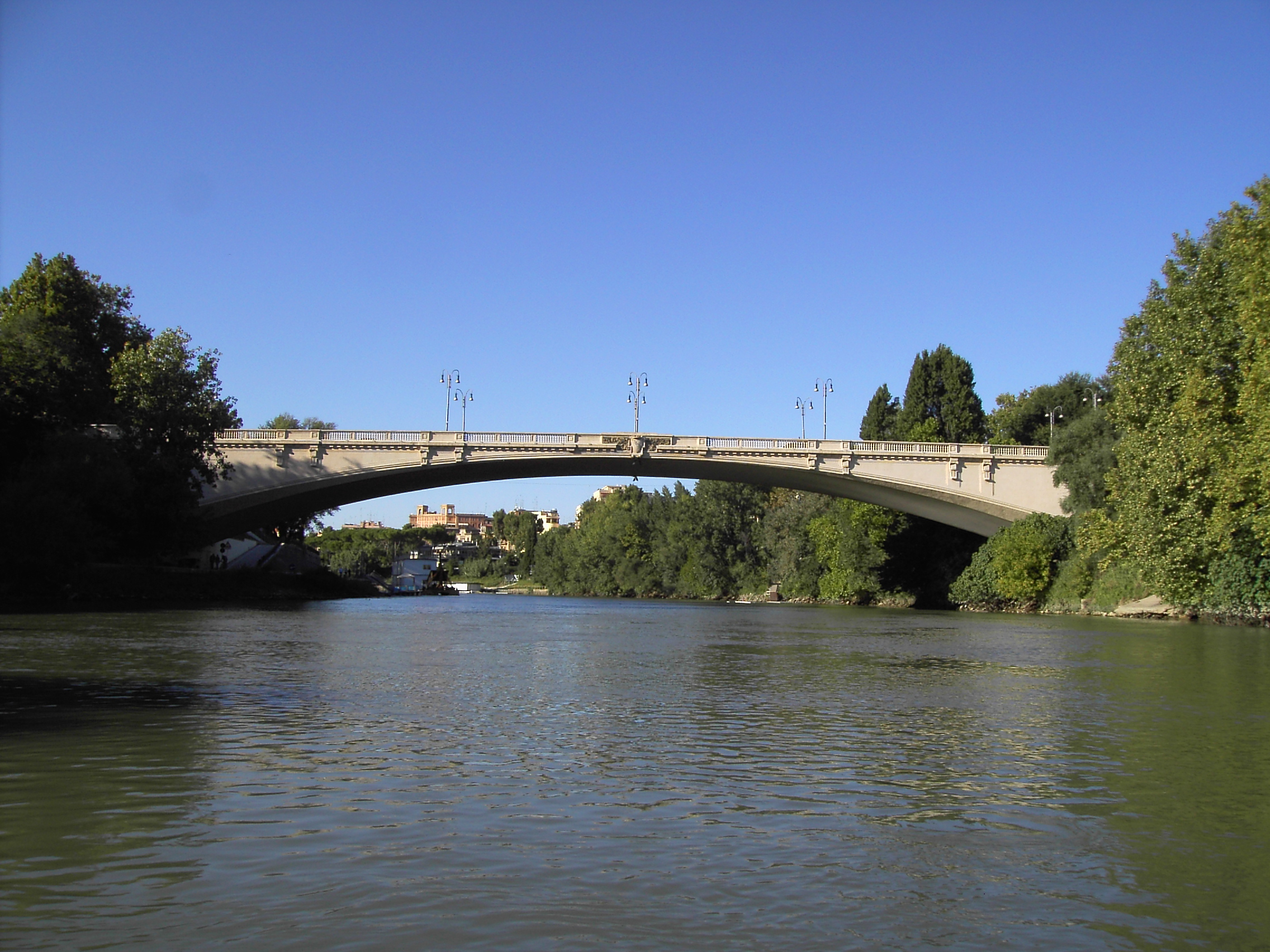
- Ponte del Risorgimento, Rome
- Coordinates: 41°55′07″N 12°28′14″E
- Crosses: River Tiber
- Locale: Rome, Flaminio and Della Vittoria Quarters, Italy

Characteristics
- Material: Reinforced concrete
- Total length: 159.10 m (522.0 ft)
- Width: 20.95 m (68.7 ft)
- Longest span: 100.00 m (328.1 ft)

History
- Designer: Giovanni Antonio Porcheddu
- Construction start: 1909
- Construction end: 1911
- Opened: April 17, 1911

Location
- Interactive map of Ponte del Risorgimento

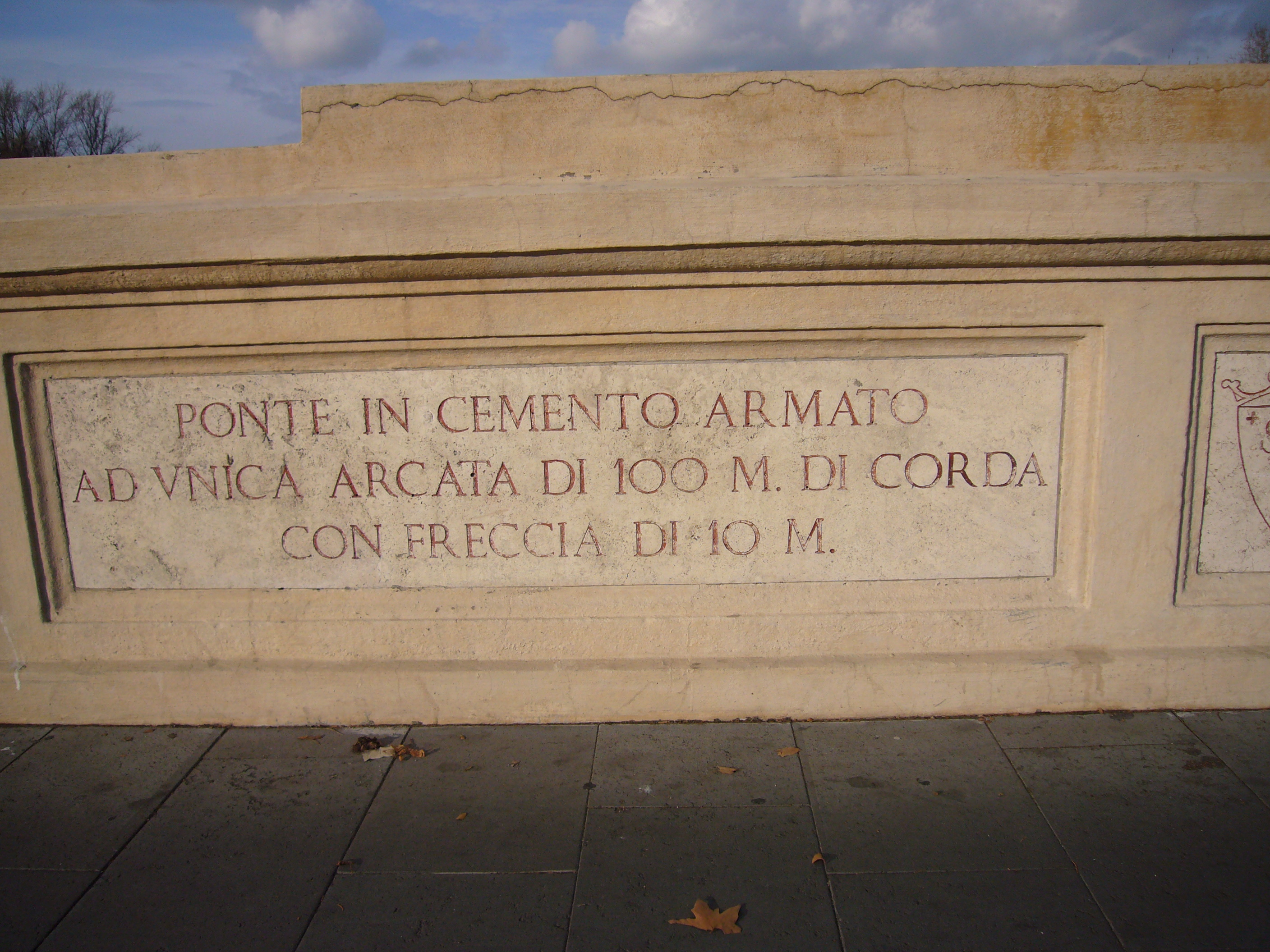

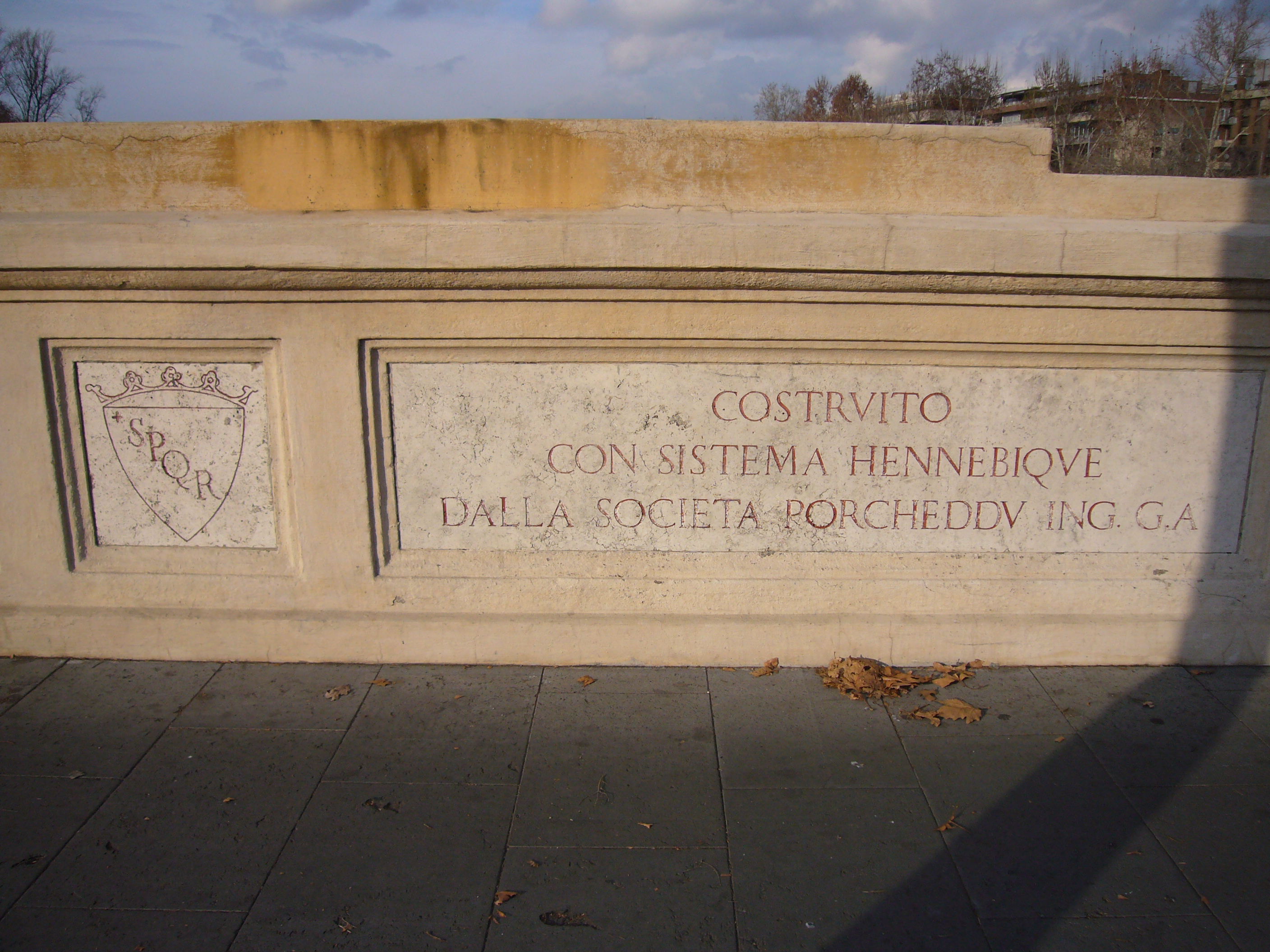
Details of the bulwarks with the inscriptions by the designer

Ponte del Risorgimento (or briefly Ponte Risorgimento) is a bridge that links Piazzale delle Belle Arti to Piazza Monte Grappa in Rome (Italy), in the Flaminio and Della Vittoria quarters.

== History and description ==
The bridge links the area of Lungotevere delle Armi to Piazzale delle Belle Arti.

The works for the building began in 1909 and were completed two years later. The bridge was designed and built by Giovanni Antonio Porcheddu, with the cooperation of the engineers Giaj and Parvopassu, on the occasion of the exhibition for celebrating the 50th anniversary of Italian unification. It is the first bridge in Rome made in reinforced concrete, since its creator, at that time, was the only Italian dealer of the patent of the Belgian François Hennebique.

The day of the inauguration (April 17, 1911), the spectators doubted that the structure, after the removal of the supporting scaffoldings, wouldn't have stood up; on the contrary, Porcheddu was so sure about the effectiveness and reliability of the new technique that he wanted to attend the demolition of the scaffolding on a little boat just below the arch of the bridge, together with his two youngest kids, Giuseppe and Ambrogia. During the ceremony, King Victor Emmanuel III offered Porcheddu the epithet "King of reinforced concrete".

In the middle of the bridge, on both bulwarks, are two inscriptions:

INAVGVRATO L'11 MAGGIO DEL 1911
NEL CINQVANTENARIO DELLA PROCLAMAZIONE
DI ROMA CAPITALE D'ITALIA
DALL'AMMINISTRAZIONE POPOLARE CITTADINA
AL RISORGIMENTO ITALIANO
(Inaugurated on May 11, 1911
in the fiftieth anniversary of the proclamation
of Rome as Capital of Italy
by the popular city administration
in memory of Italian Risorgimento)

on one side, and

PONTE IN CEMENTO ARMATO
AD VNICA ARCATA DI 100 M. DI CORDA
CON FRECCIA DI 10 M.
COSTRVITO
CON SISTEMA HENNEBIQVE
DALLA SOCIETA PORCHEDDV ING.G.A
(Reinforced concrete bridge
with a 100-meters-chord single arch
and a 10-meters arch rise
built
with the Hennebique system
by the company Porcheddu Ing. G.A)

on the other.

== Bibliography ==
- Ravaglioli, Armando. Roma anno 2750 ab Urbe condita. Storia, monumenti, personaggi, prospettive (1997 ed.). Tascabili Economici Newton, Rome. ISBN 88-8183-670-X.
- Rendina, Claudio. Enciclopedia di Roma (2005 ed.). Newton Compton Editori, Rome. ISBN 88-541-0304-7.
- Dolara, Ezio. Enciclopedia di Roma (2005 ed.). Newton Compton Editori, Rome. ISBN 88-541-0304-7.
- Ezio Dolara (2011). "Il Ponte del Risorgimento a Roma. Storia, cronaca, genialità, intuizione". Noir – Notiziario dell'Ordine degli Ingegneri della Provincia di Roma (486): 22–29.
