= Lungotevere delle Armi =

Coordinates: 41°55′00″N 12°28′10″E

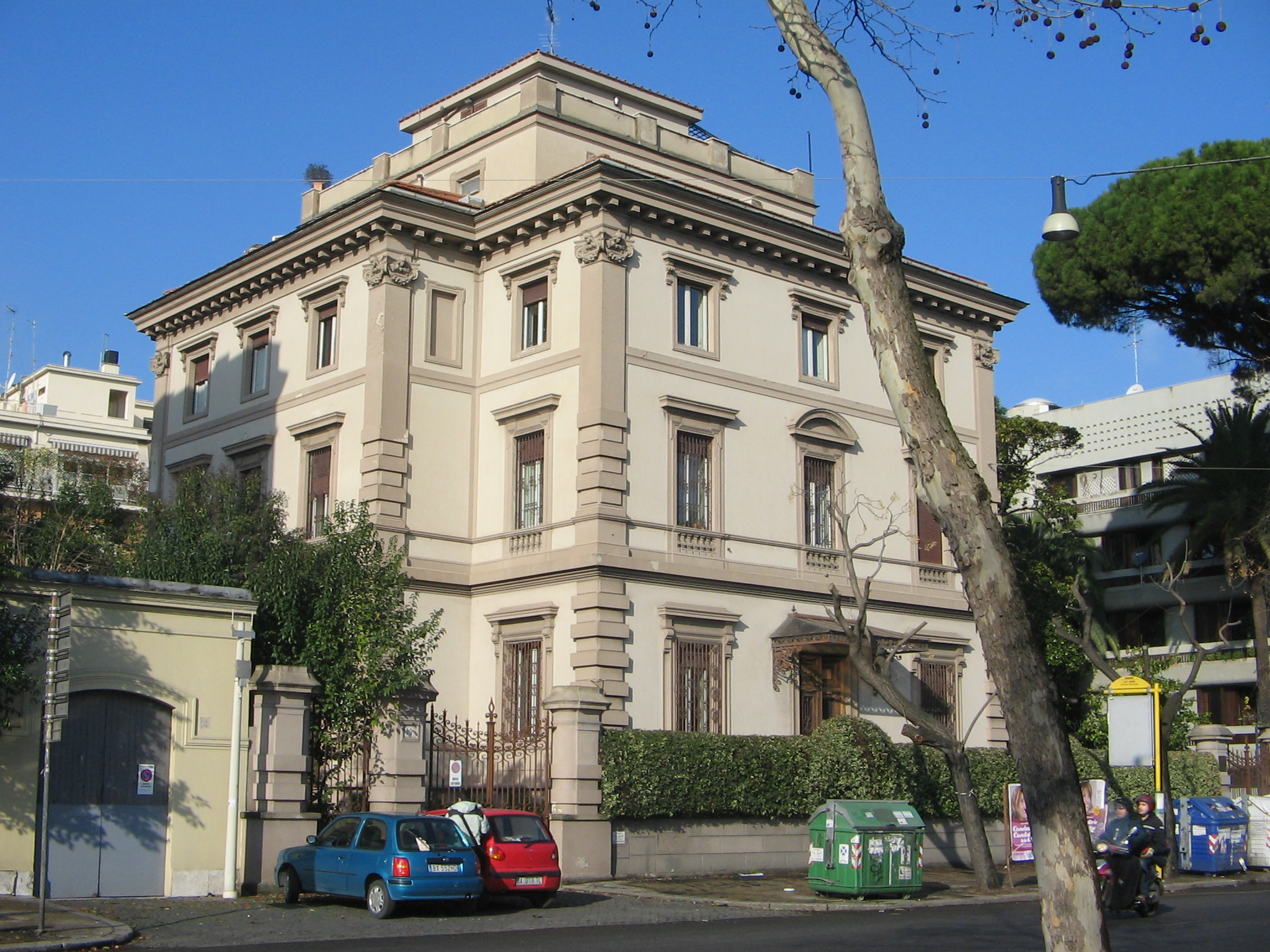
Lungotevere delle Armi: one of the mansions (villini) of early 20th century

Lungotevere delle Armi (Italian for Lungotevere of the Weapons) is the stretch of Lungotevere that links Piazza Monte Grappa to Piazza delle Cinque Giornate in Rome (Italy), in Della Vittoria District.

Near the Lungoteveere there was a square, no more existing, used for square-bashings (from which the Lungotevere took its name): in the area Buffalo Bill and his circus camped in 1906, Léon Delagrange made his fly experiments and an exhibition celebrating the 50th anniversary of the unification of Italy took place in 1911.

== Architecture ==
Lungotevere delle Armi displays some mansions (villini), whose architecture is a mix of Renaissance and Baroque features, following the fashion in vogue between 1909 and 1911, on the occasion of the National Contest of Architecture within the exhibition celebrating the 50th anniversary of the unification of Italy; some edifices built at that time were later demolished.

== Villini ==
- Villino Rossellini
- Villino Brasini
- Villino Campos

== Sources ==
- Rendina, Claudio; Paradisi, Donatella. Le strade di Roma. 1st volume A-D (2004 ed.). Newton Compton Editori, Rome. ISBN 88-541-0208-3.
