= Ponte Palatino =

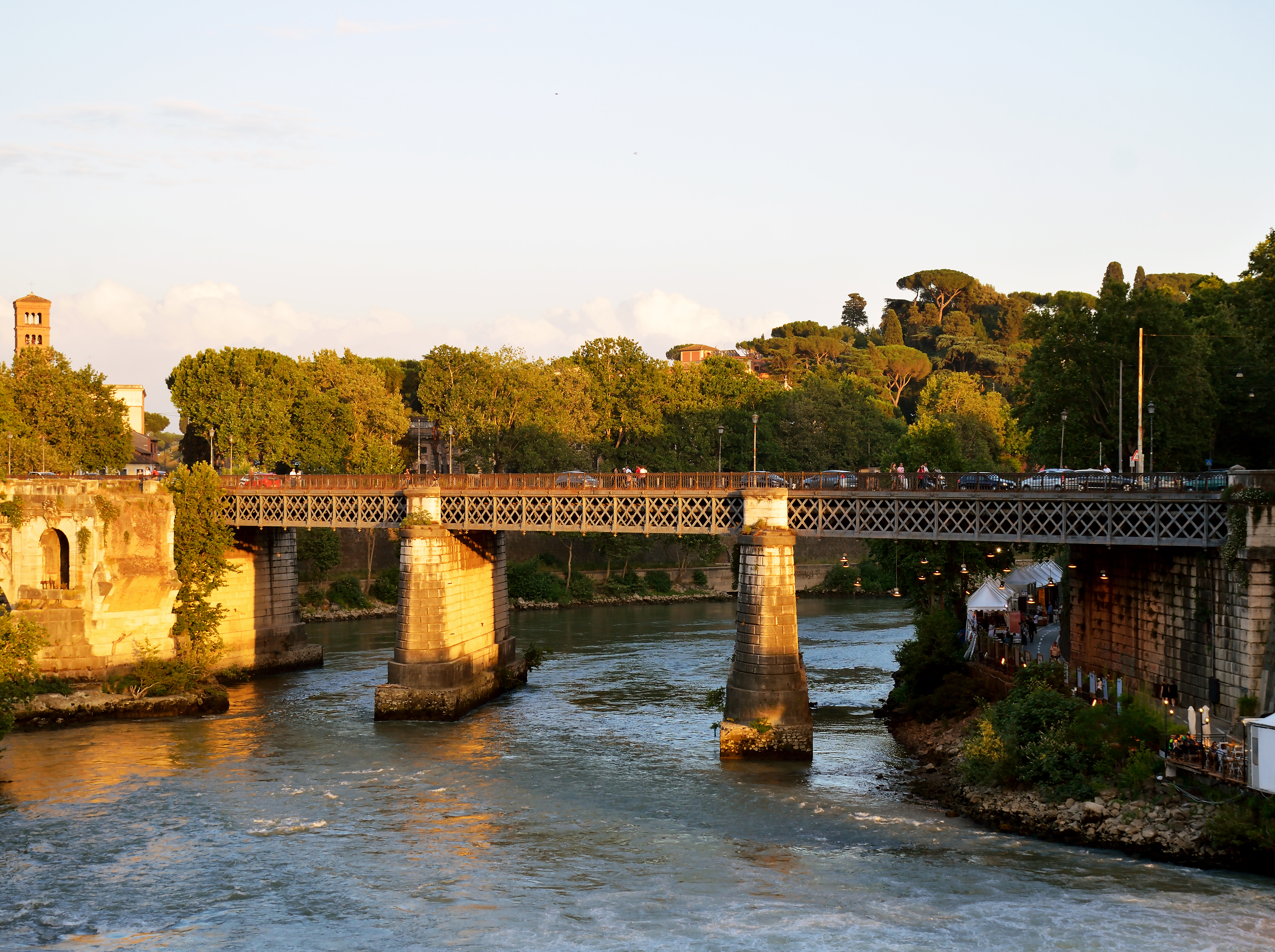
- Ponte Rotto and Ponte Palatino
- Coordinates: 41°53′20.53″N 12°28′45.09″E
- Crosses: Tiber
- Locale: Rome

Characteristics
- Total length: 155 metres (509 ft)

History
- Architect: Angelo Vescovali
- Construction start: 1886
- Construction end: 1890

Location
- Click on the map for a fullscreen view

Ponte Palatino, also known as Ponte Inglese (Italian for English Bridge), is a bridge that links Lungotevere Aventino to Lungotevere Ripa in Rome (Italy), in the Rioni Ripa and Trastevere.

== Description ==
The bridge was designed by architect Angelo Vescovali and built between 1886 and 1890 in place of the partially destroyed, 2,200-year-old Pons Aemilius (also called Ponte Rotto, "Broken Bridge"). One arch of the ancient three-arch bridge was destroyed by a flood in 1598, while another arch was demolished by Vescovali in 1887 to make room for the Ponte Palatino, thus leaving the Pons Aemilius just a single arch in mid-river, situated adjacent to the modern bridge.

Ponte Palatino takes its name from the Palatine Hill, at whose slopes the structure rises. The bridge links the Forum Boarium to Piazza Castellani, in front of the Tiber Island; the epithet English is due to the left-hand traffic flow that applies on it, just as in the United Kingdom.

It shows four masonry piers with a metal top surface and is 155 metres (509 ft) long.

== Bibliography ==
- Rendina, Claudio (2005). Enciclopedia di Roma. Rome: Newton Compton Editori. ISBN 88-541-0304-7.
