= Lungotevere Maresciallo Cadorna =

Part of Lungotevere in Rome, Italy

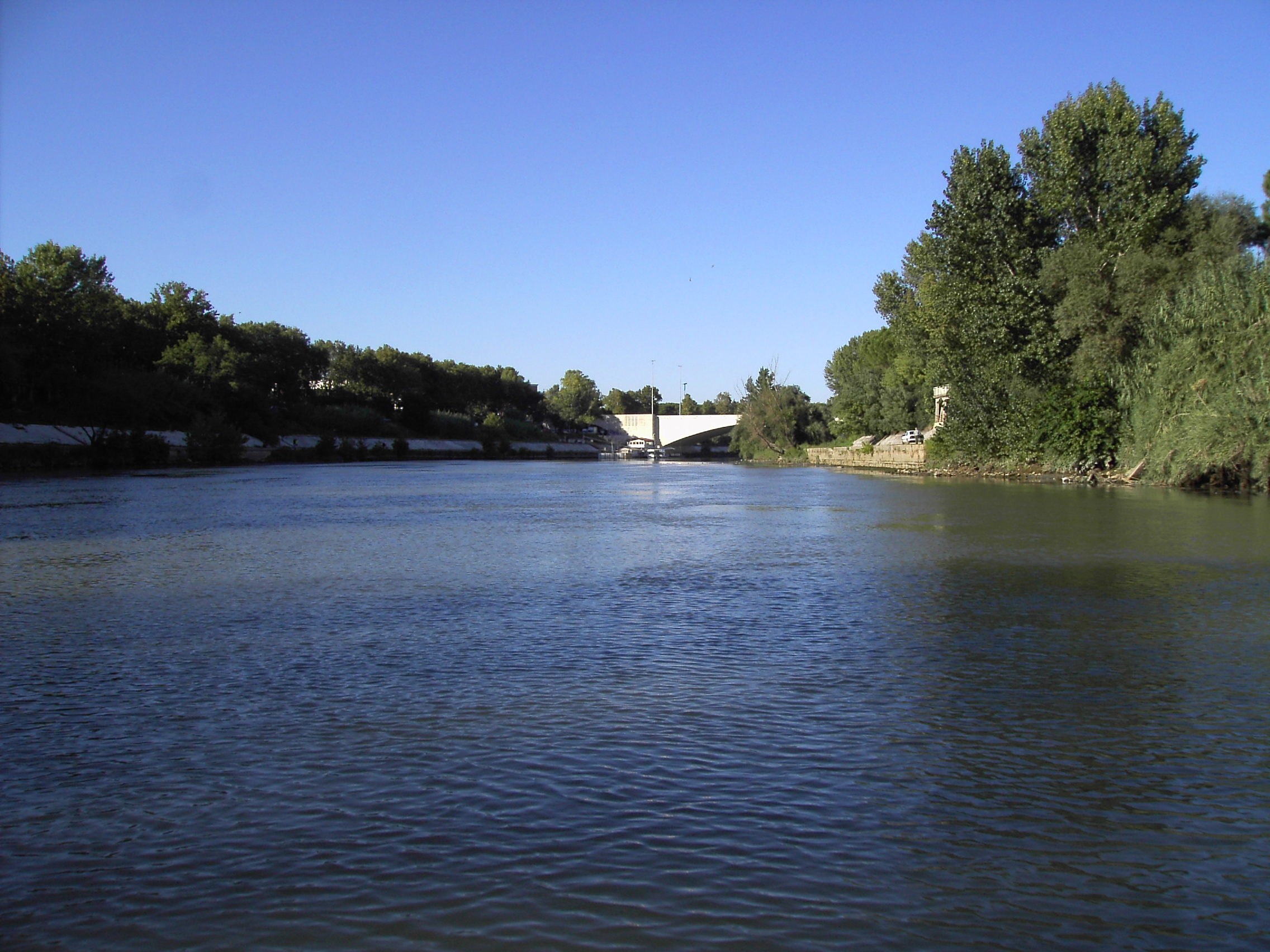
- Ponte Duca d'Aosta; on the left, Lungotevere Maresciallo Cadorna.
- Interactive map of Lungotevere Maresciallo Cadorna
- Former name: Foro Mussolini (facilities area)
- Namesake: Luigi Cadorna
- Location: Rome, Italy
- Quarter: Della Vittoria
- From: Piazzale Maresciallo Giardino
- To: Piazza Lauro De Bosis

Lungotevere Maresciallo Cadorna is a stretch of the Lungotevere, a boulevard that runs along the Tiber River in the Della Vittoria quarter of Rome, Italy. It links Piazzale Maresciallo Giardino to Piazza Lauro De Bosis.

The Lungotevere was dedicated to the Marshal of Italy Luigi Cadorna, an Italian leader during World War I. It was established as per Governor resolution on March 8, 1937.

== Facilities ==
The Lungotevere is in the area of the Foro Italico, formerly Foro Mussolini. It includes the Foresteria Sud, a building designed between 1929 and 1932 by Enrico Del Debbio, who also modified it between 1936 and 1937 by adding a second floor entirely covered with white Carrara marble. The edifice became the seat of the CIVIS (the association of Italian blood donors) in 1957 and since 1967 is an hostel of youth.

Sport facilities in the Foro Italico were constructed between 1958 and 1960, ending with the completion of the Stadio Olimpico del Nuoto, based on a design by Enrico Del Debbio and Annibale Vitellozzi and used for important events such as the 1960 Summer Olympics, the 1983 European Aquatics Championships, the 1994 World Aquatics Championships and the 2009 World Aquatics Championships.

== Bibliography ==
- Rendina, Claudio; Paradisi, Donatella (2004). Le strade di Roma. 2nd volume E-O. Newton Compton Editori, Rome. ISBN 88-541-0209-1.
