= Papareschi =

Papareschi is an Italian surname, and may refer to:

- House of Papareschi (also De Papa or Paparoni) a noble family of medieval Rome. To it belong:
  - Gregorio Papareschi (cardinal) (12th century), cardinal-nephew of Pope Innocent II
  - Gregorio Papareschi (died 1143), Italian pope known as Innocent II
  - Pietro Papareschi (12th century), cardinal-nephew of Pope Innocent II
  - Romano Bonaventura (died 1243), also listed as Romano Papareschi
