= Ponte Cavour =

Bridge in Rome

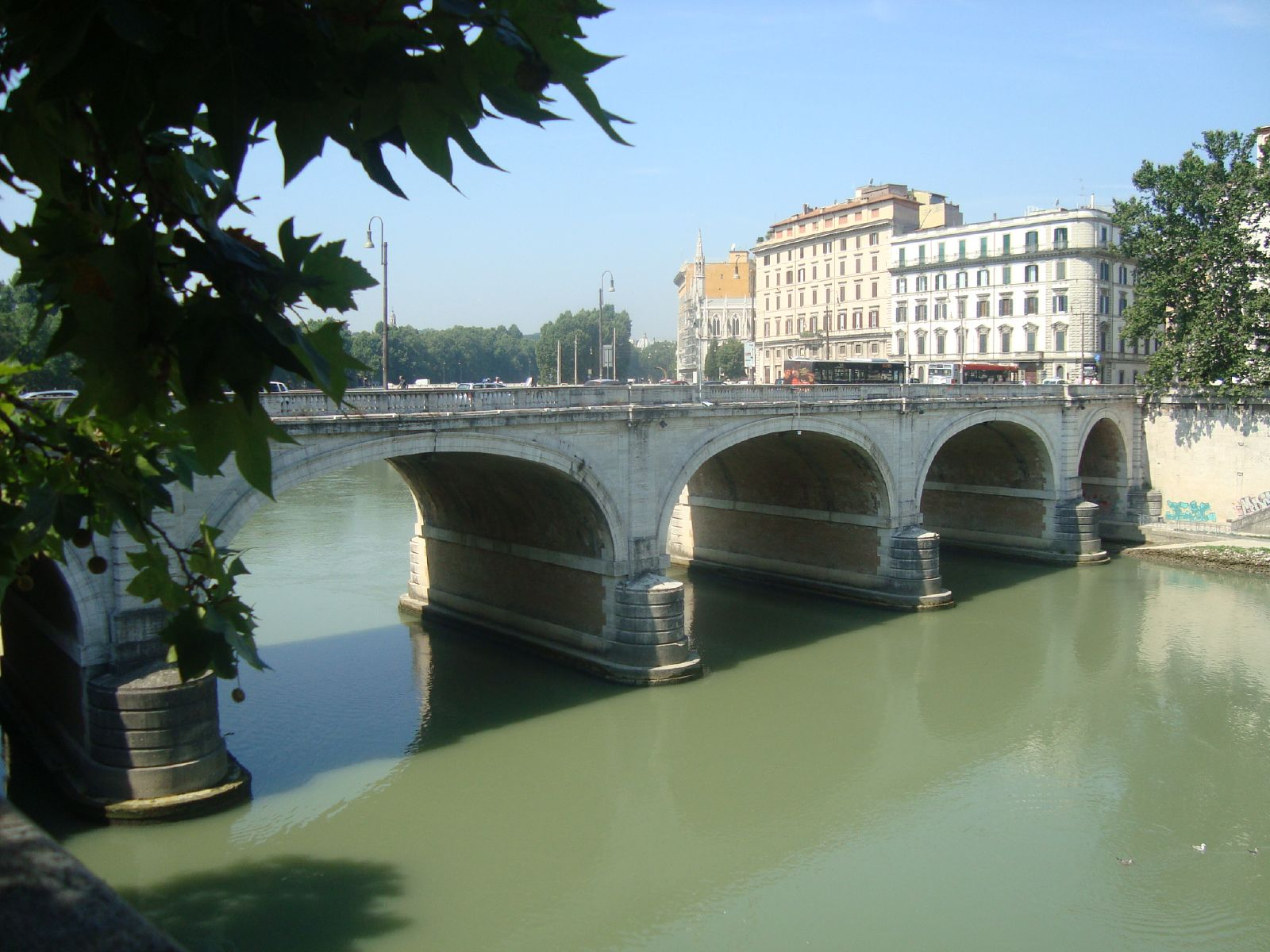
- Coordinates: 41.904964°N 12.474385°E
- Crosses: Tiber
- Locale: Rome (Italy)

Characteristics
- Material: Travertine
- Total length: 110.10 metres (361.2 ft)
- Width: 20.5 metres (67 ft)

History
- Architect: Angelo Vescovali
- Construction start: 1896
- Construction end: 1901

Location
- Click on the map for a fullscreen view

Ponte Cavour is a bridge in Rome (Italy), connecting Piazza del Porto di Ripetta to Lungotevere dei Mellini, in the Rioni Campo Marzio and Prati.

The bridge also serves as a connection between Piazza Cavour and the area of Campo Marzio near the Ara Pacis.

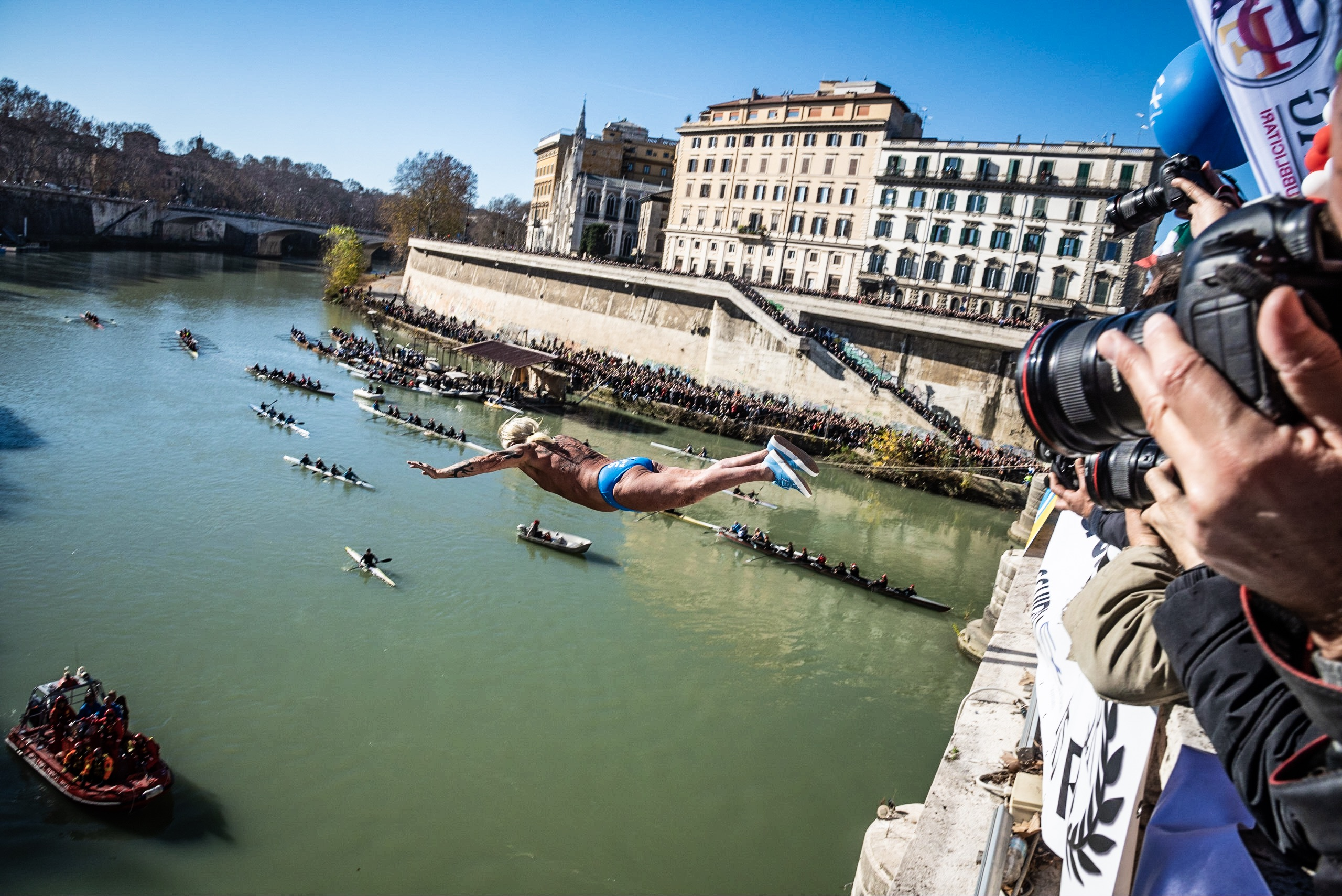
the Roman tradition of the New Year's dive into the Tiber.

Since the postwar period, in the morning of 1 January of each year the tradition of diving into the Tiber is renewed by swimmers jumping from the parapet of the bridge.

== History ==
The bridge, designed by the architect Angelo Vescovali, was built between 1896 and 1901, to replace the temporary Passerella di Ripetta, dating back to 1878. It was inaugurated on 25 May 1901 and named after Camillo Benso, Count of Cavour, one of the pioneers of Italian unification.

== Description ==
The bridge has five masonry arches covered with travertine; it is 20 metres (66 ft) large and about 100 metres (330 ft) long.

Metro stop (Spagna, line A)

== See also ==
- John Craig
- List of bridges in Rome

== Bibliography ==
- Armando Ravaglioli (1997). Roma anno 2750 ab Urbe condita. Storia, monumenti, personaggi, prospettive. Rome: Tascabili Economici Newton. ISBN 88-8183-670-X.
- Claudio Rendina (2005). Enciclopedia di Roma. Rome: Newton Compton Editori. ISBN 88-541-0304-7.
