= Ponte Testaccio =

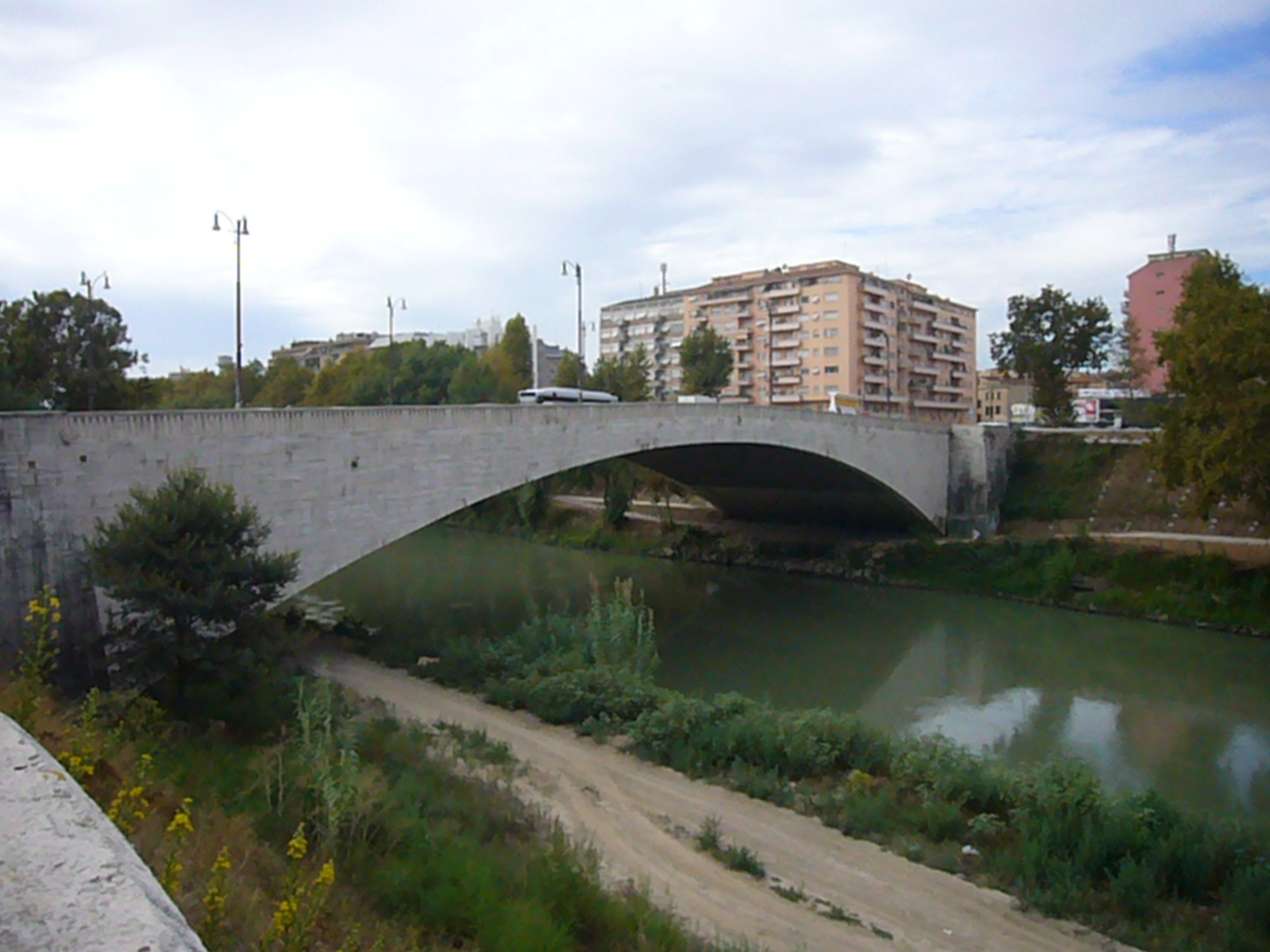
- Coordinates: 41°52′31″N 12°28′13″E
- Crosses: Tiber
- Locale: Rome

Characteristics
- Material: Travertine
- Total length: 122 metres (400 ft)
- Width: 31.3 metres (103 ft)

History
- Construction start: 1938
- Construction end: 1948

Location
- Click on the map for a fullscreen view

Ponte Testaccio is a bridge that links Largo Giovanni Battista Marzi to Lungotevere Portuense in Rome (Italy), in the Rione Testaccio and in the Quarter Portuense.

== Description ==
The bridge, designed by architect Bastianelli and whose construction began in 1938, was intended to link the lengthening of Viale Aventino to Roma Trastevere railway station through the demolition of the former slaughterhouse; its name should have been Ponte d'Africa. It was inaugurated in 1948.

It shows a single arch and is 122 metres (400 ft) long; four travertine low reliefs decorate its headboards.

== Bibliography ==
- Ravaglioli, Armando (1997). Roma anno 2750 ab Urbe condita. Storia, monumenti, personaggi, prospettive. Rome: Tascabili Economici Newton. ISBN 88-8183-670-X.
