= Ponte Guglielmo Marconi =

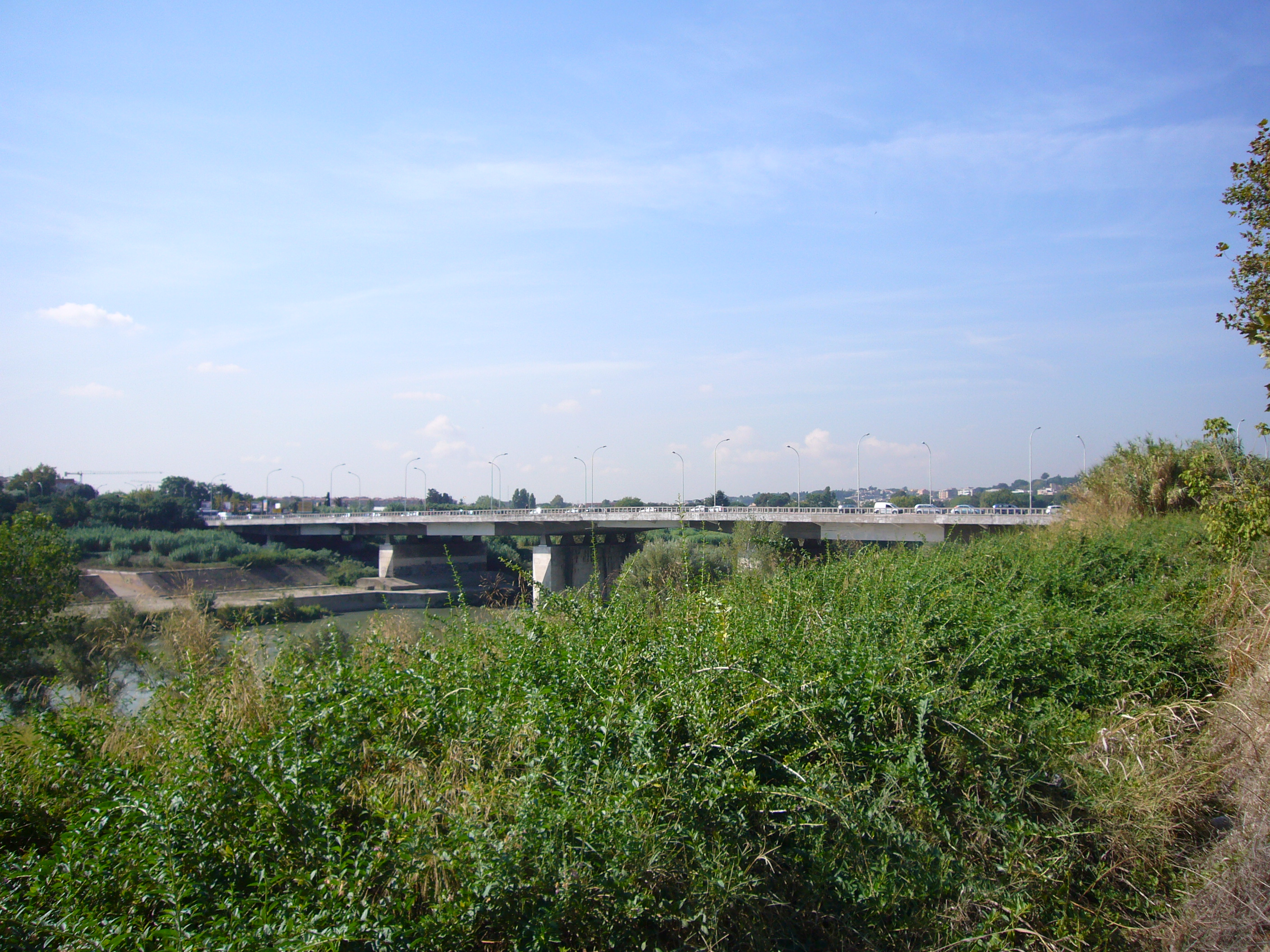
- Ponte Guglielmo Marconi, Rome
- Coordinates: 41°51′36″N 12°28′14″E
- Crosses: River Tiber
- Locale: Rome, Ostiense and Portuense districts, Italy

Characteristics
- Material: Reinforced concrete
- Total length: 235 m (771.0 ft)
- Width: 31 m (101.7 ft)

History
- Construction start: 1937
- Construction end: 1955
- Opened: 1955

Ponte Guglielmo Marconi, also known as Ponte Marconi, is a Roman bridge that connects Piazza Augusto Righi with Piazza Tommaso Edison, in Rome, in the Ostiense and Portuense districts.

== Description ==
The bridge was built between 1937 and 1955; the construction was interrupted because of World War II and was resumed only in 1953. The bridge was dedicated to Guglielmo Marconi, bearing the same name as the long avenue (Viale Guglielmo Marconi) through it. At about 235 metres (771 ft), it is the longest bridge in Rome.

It has six arches and is about 31 metres (102 ft) wide.

== Sources ==
- Ravaglioli, Armando (1997). Roma anno 2750 ab Urbe condita. Storia, monumenti, personaggi, prospettive. Roma: Tascabili Economici Newton. ISBN 88-8183-670-X.
- Rendina, Claudio (2005). Enciclopedia di Roma. Roma: Newton Compton Editori. ISBN 88-541-0304-7.
