= Luigi Moretti =

Italian architect

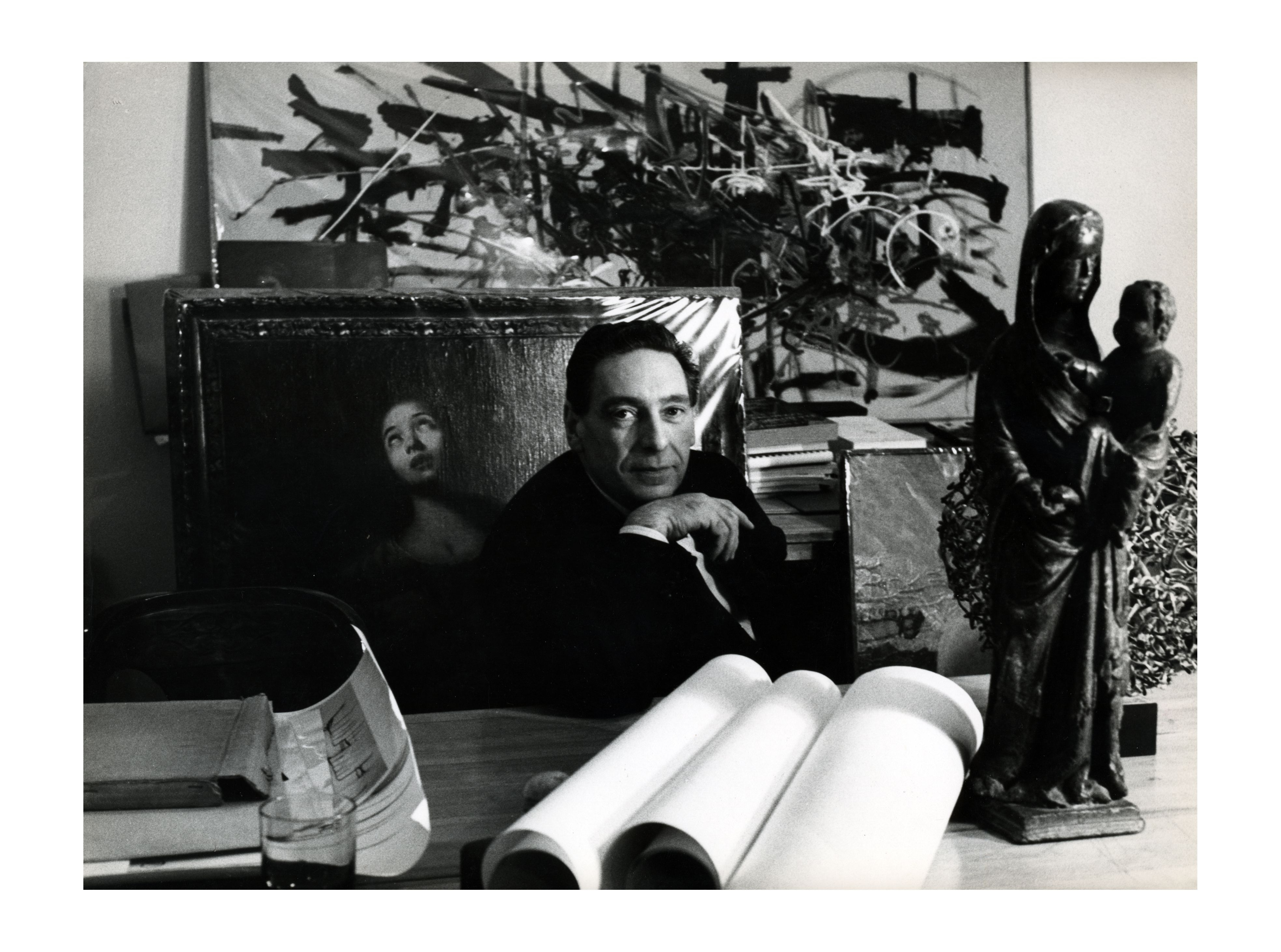
- Luigi at his architect's desk in early 1973
- Born: 2 January 1907; Rome, Kingdom of Italy
- Died: 14 July 1973 (aged 66); Capraia Island, Italy
- Education: Royal School of Architecture in Rome
- Occupation: Architect
- Awards: Antonio Feltrinelli Prize, 1968
- Buildings: Fencing academy at Foro Italico, Rome; Tour de la Bourse, Montreal, with Pier Luigi Nervi; Watergate complex, Washington

Luigi Walter Moretti (2 January 1907 – 14 July 1973) was an Italian architect. Active especially in Italy from the 1930s, he designed buildings such as the Watergate Complex in Washington DC, The Academy of Fencing, and Il Girasole ("The Sunflower") house, both in Rome. He was the founder of the Institute for Operations Research and Applied Mathematics Urbanism, where he developed his research on the history of architecture, and on the application of algorithmic methods to architectural design. He is recognized as the inventor of parametric architecture.

== Career ==
=== Education and academic career ===
He was born on via Napoleone III, on the Esquiline Hill, in the same apartment where he lived almost his entire life. He was the natural son of Luigi Rolland (1852–1921), engineer and architect, born in Rome in a Belgian family, whose most important work is Teatro Adriano, and Maria Giuseppina Moretti. He attended primary and secondary school at Collegio San Giuseppe - Istituto De Merode and from 1925 he studied at the Royal School of Architecture in Rome. In 1929, Moretti graduated with honors, with a project for a college of higher education Rocca di Papa, where he won the Giuseppe Valadier award.

After degree, in 1931 he won a three-year scholarship for Roman Studies, established by the Governorate of Rome and the Royal School of Architecture. With this grant he worked with archeologist an art historian Corrado Ricci, in the arrangement of the areas east and north of Trajan's Market. In these years he also worked as assistant for the professorships of Vincenzo Fasolo (architect of Mamiani Lyceum and Duca d'Aosta Bridge, both in Rome) and Gustavo Giovannoni, at the restoration chair.

=== Activity in building and urban development ===
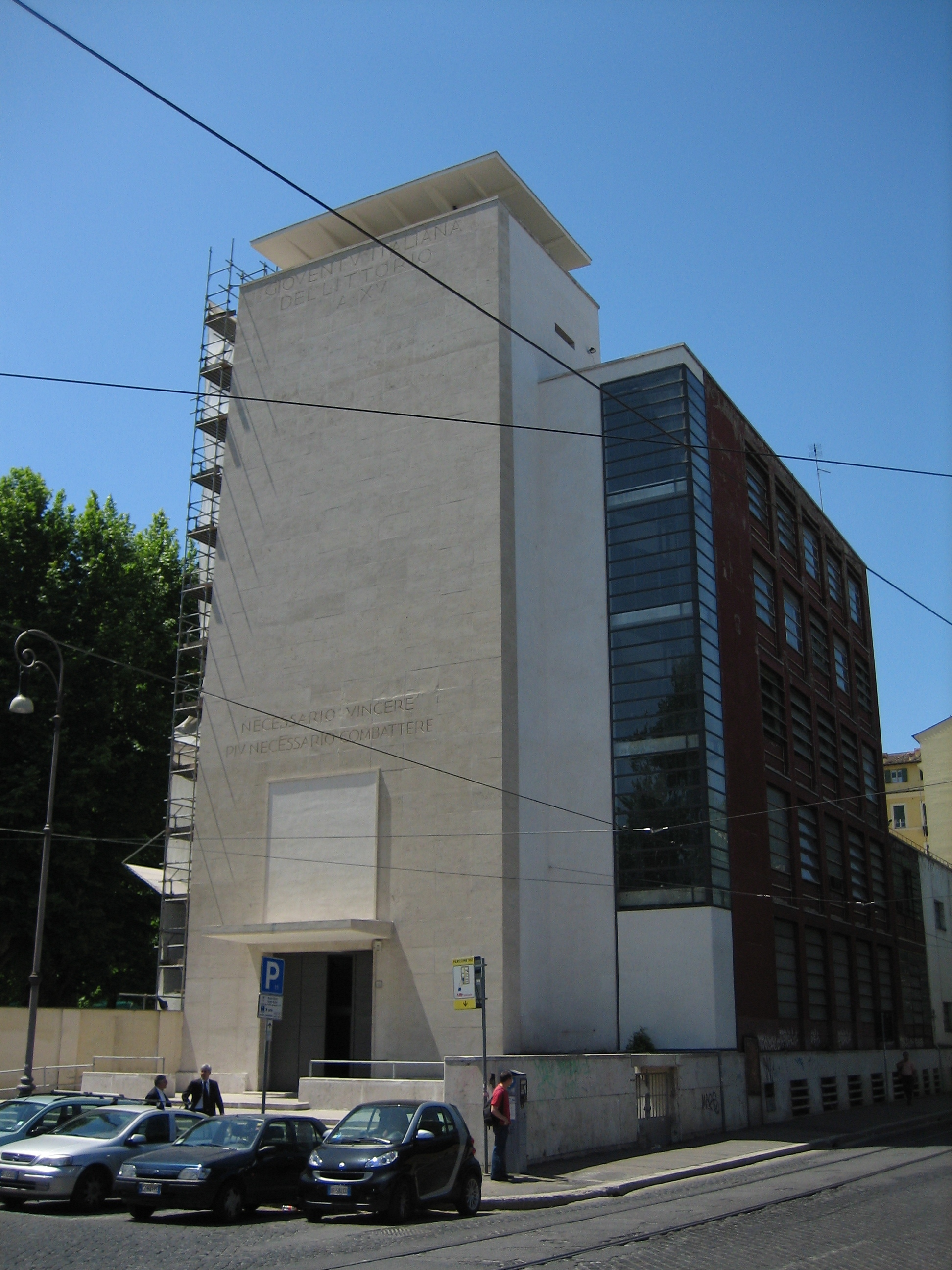
Gioventù Italiana del Littorio (GIL, fascist youth organization) building in Trastevere, Rome, one of Moretti's notable early works

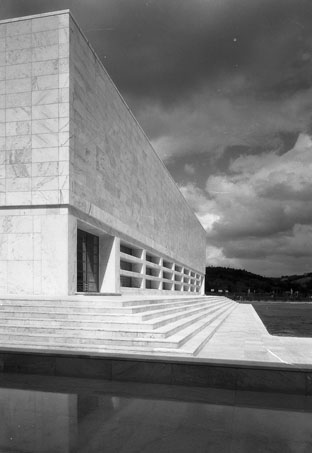
L'Accademia di scherma (Academy of Fencing) at Foro Mussolini, Rome (1936)

In 1932, Moretti entered in competitions for the town planning of Verona, Perugia, and Faenza, for which he obtained the second place. He also entered in a competition for a council house complex in Naples.

The next year, after ending the university career, with Giulio Pediconi, Mario Paniconi e Mario Tufaroli, attended at the fifth Triennale di Milano with a project for a country house designed for a scholar. In this year he also met Renato Ricci, at that time president of the Opera Nazionale Balilla (ONB), that, the following year, appointed Moretti ONB technical director, succeeding to Enrico Del Debbio. In this role Moretti designed some of the youth centres of ONB and Gioventù Italiana del Littorio: in 1933 in Piacenza and in Rome, Trastevere, in 1934 in Trecate, in 1935 a women's centre in Piacenza and in 1937 another youth centre in Urbino. His work was also part of the architecture event in the art competition at the 1936 Summer Olympics.

In 1937 he took over the design of the regulatory plan of the Foro Mussolini (renamed Foro Italico after the Second World War), where he created some of his masterpieces, such as the academy of fencing and the Duce's Gym (both 1936) and the commemoration cell (of 1940).

His are also the major planner of the Forum, enriched in the 1937 with the square of the Empire and the Stadium of Cypresses (expanded in 1953 and 1990 of other architects to become the Stadio Olimpico).

Moretti's works were published in the journal Architecture.

In those years he participated in the competition for the construction of the Palazzo Littorio (Casa del Fascio), a project harshly criticized by the magazine Casabella and progressive Italian architectural culture in general.

In 1938 he participated in the design of the E42 (Esposizione 1942) later changed to EUR (Esposizione Universale Romana) standing for Rome World's fair. Moretti(with Fariello, Muratori and Quaroni) won the competition for the design of the Imperial Square (now Piazza Guglielmo Marconi). The large building fronting the square was never finished, but after the war the structures already constructed were used for the "Skyscraper Italy (Grattacielo Italia)" by Luigi Mattioni.

He served in that period, in private practice, thanks mainly to his friendships with Fascist officials and journalists.

In the period between 1942 and 1945 Moretti disappeared from public view. He reappeared in 1945, was arrested for his collaboration with fascism, and was briefly imprisoned in the prison of San Victor, where he met count Adolfo Fossataro. After release, with him in November of the same year, founded Cofimprese company.

=== The postwar period ===
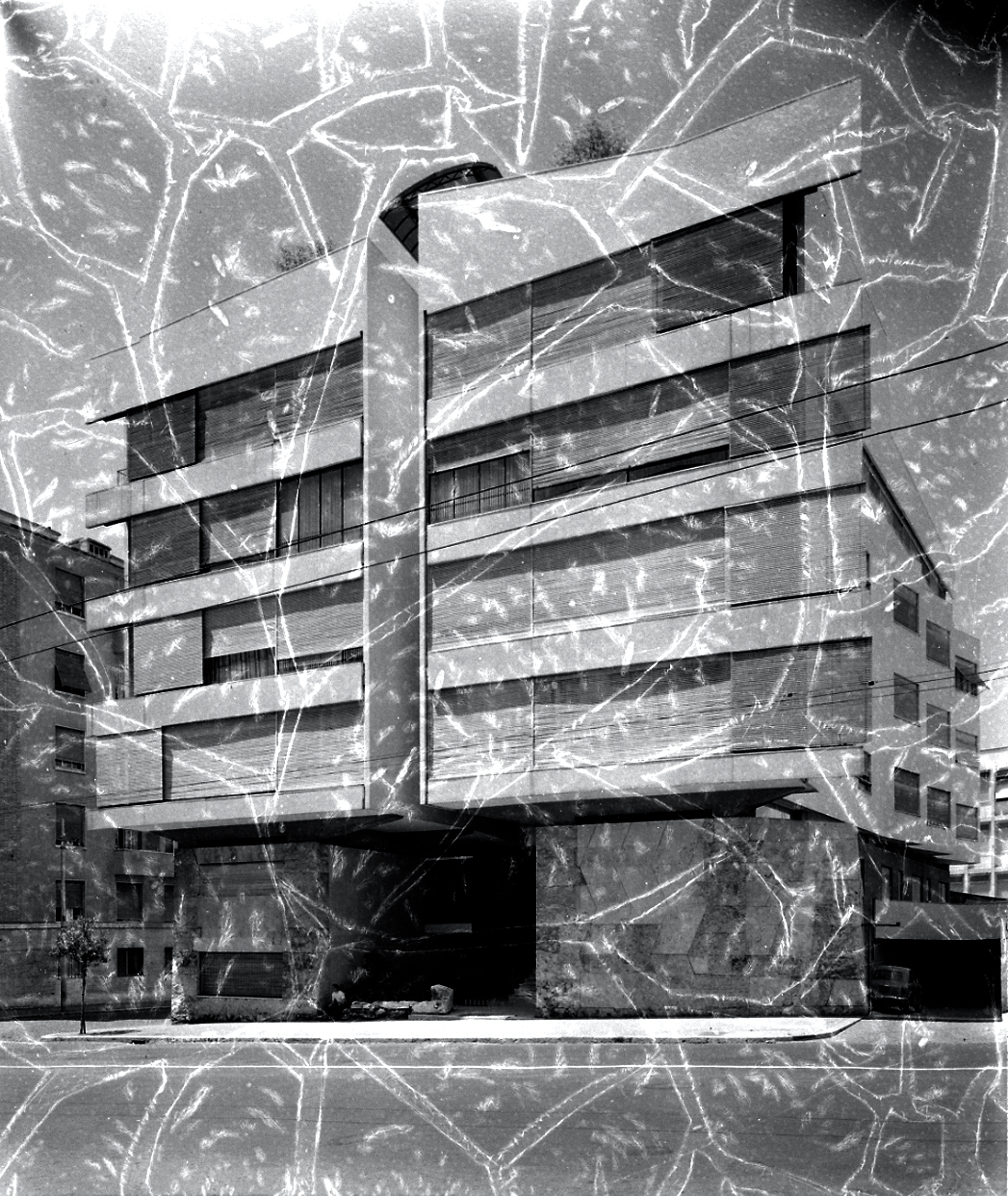
House "Il Girasole", Rome, 1948. Photo by Paolo Monti, 1951 (Paolo Monti Archive, BEIC)

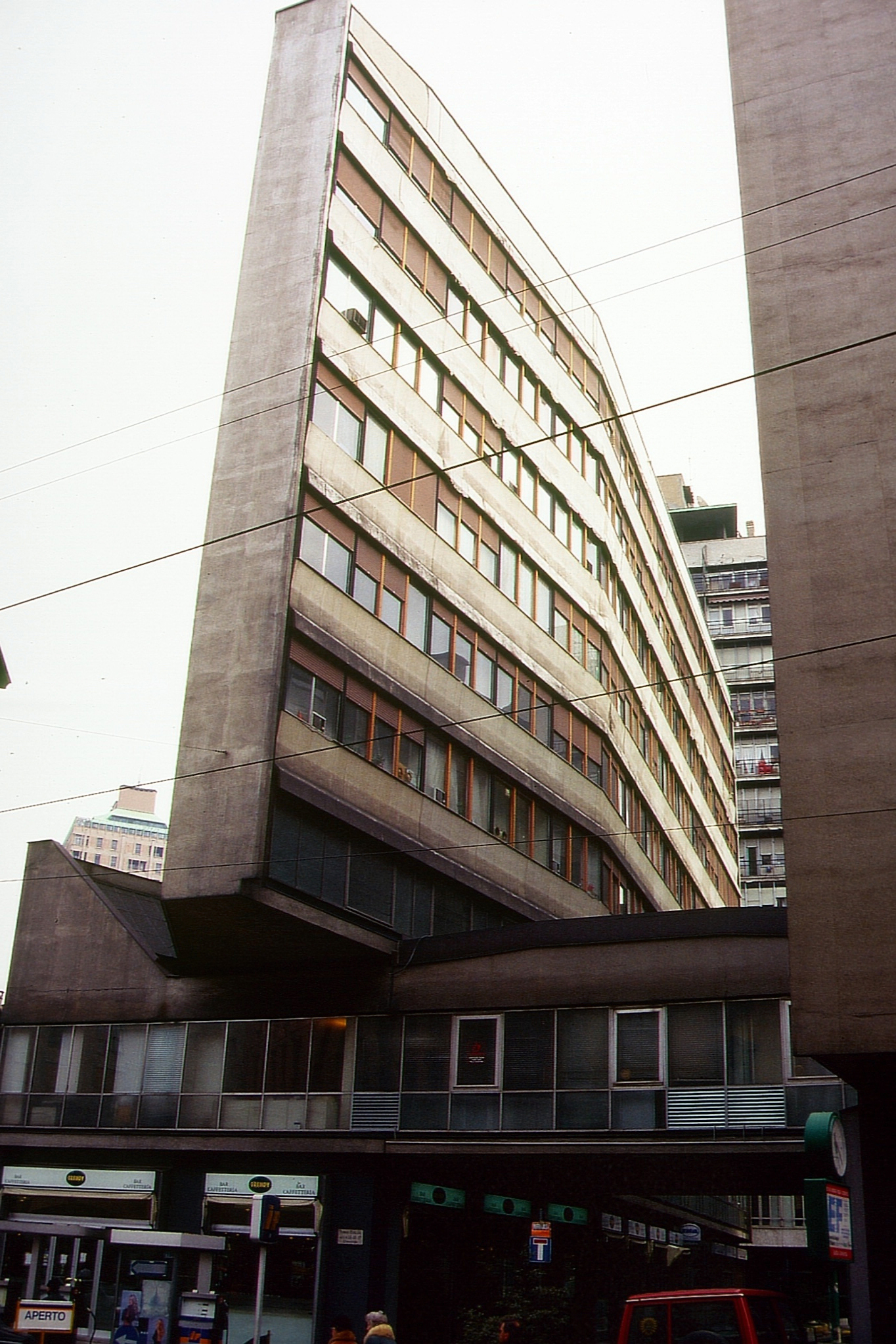
Complex between Corso Italia and Via Rugabella, Milan, 1996

With Cofimprese, he worked to develop house-hotel buildings. The original plan was for 20 hotels, of which only three were built before the company broke up in 1949. Also in Milan for Cofimprese, designed the complex between Corso Italia and Via Rugabella

The house Il Girasole ("The Sunflower") designed in 1949, and built in Rome in viale Bruno Buozzi (near via Parioli) in 1950, is one of the best-known projects of the period, and is considered an early example of postmodern architecture. The building is also mentioned by Robert Venturi in his essay Complexity and Contradiction in Architecture as an example of ambiguous architecture, poised between tradition and innovation. According to Swiss architectural theorist Stanislaus von Moos, the Vanna Venturi House, one of Venturi's masterpiece, in its broken pediments "recalls the 'duality' of the facade of Luigi Moretti's apartment house on the Via Parioli in Rome."

Then Moretti designed villas for illustrious patrons, including La Villa Saracena (1954) in Santa Marinella for the former director of the Rome newspaper Il Messaggero, Francesco Malgeri.

Photographs by Paolo Monti of the complex between Corso Italia and via Rugabella, Milan, 1981

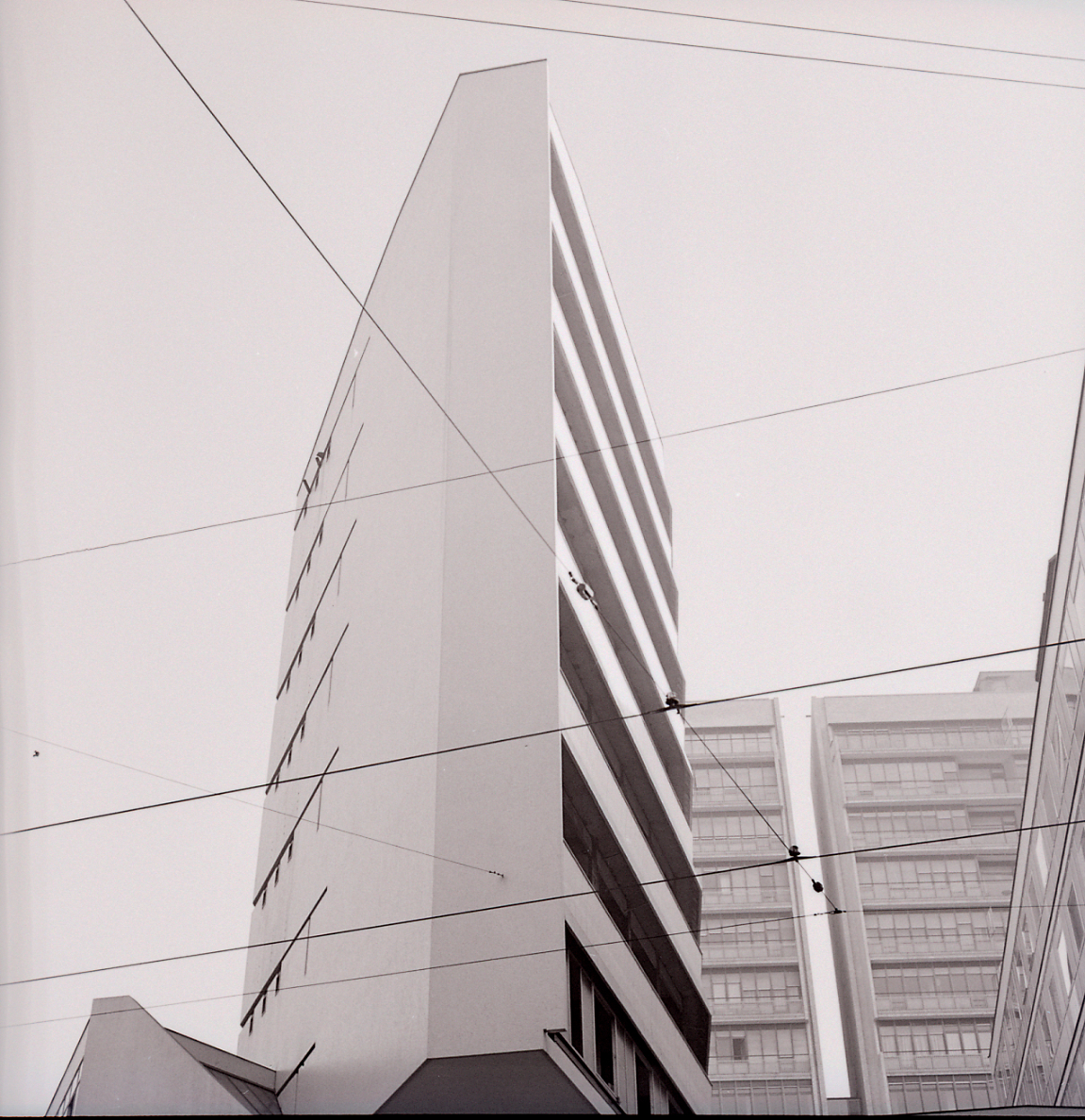
Side view from Corso Italia

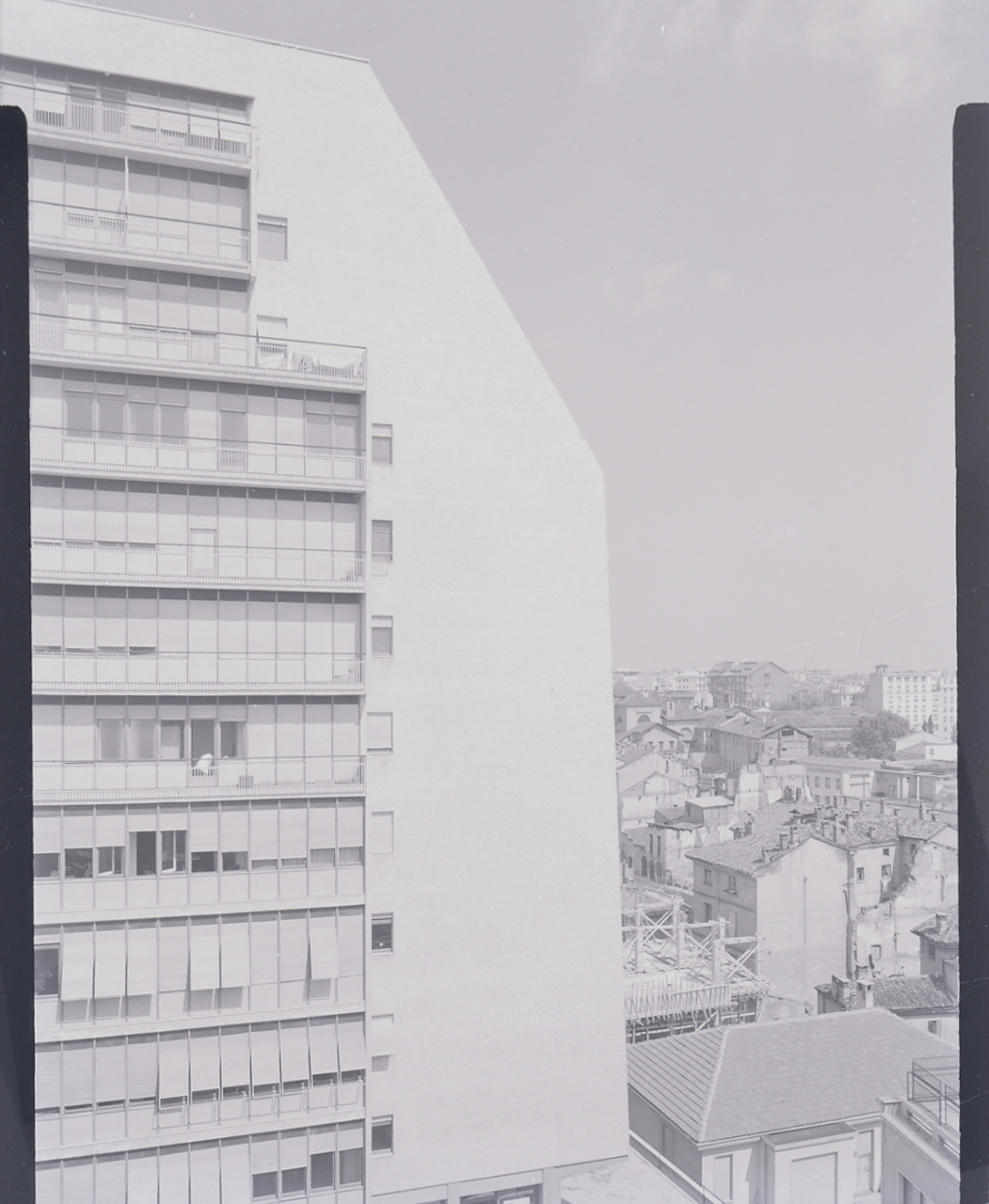
Facade

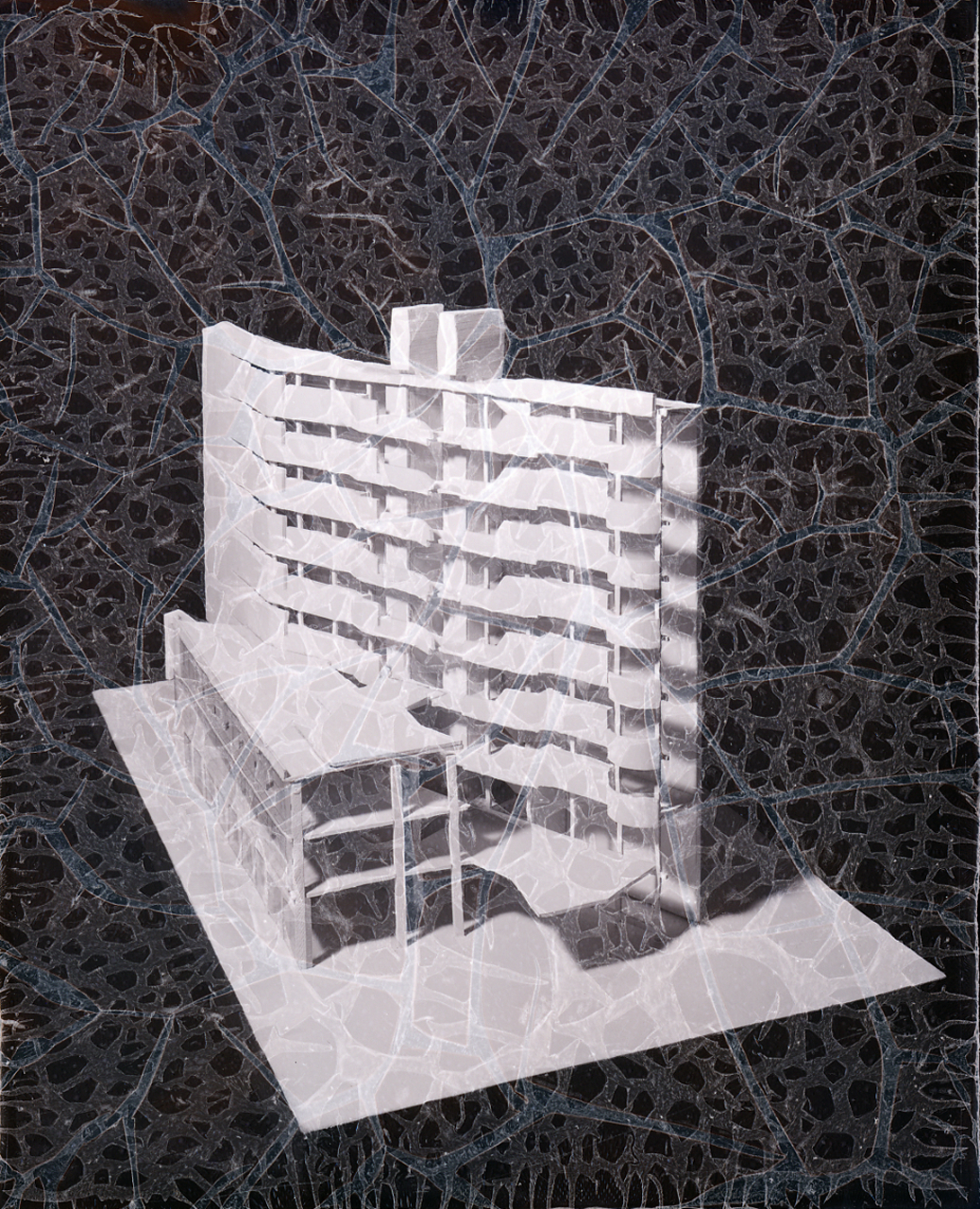
Model

=== Not only architecture ===
In 1950, he founded the magazine Space, Review of Arts and Architecture (published until 1953) to find a connection between different forms of art (from architecture to sculpture, from painting to film and theater), not by chance that the first issue began with an essay titled "Eclecticism and units of language". The journal was managed and written almost entirely by the Roman architect who made it come together in the results of his research and study on it wise public key, such abstract forms in the sculpture Baroque, discontinuity of space in Caravaggio and structures and sequences of spaces. Moretti was editorial director and editor. The magazine, printed in Milan, first by the printers E. Barigazzi, then by Lucini, was short-lived, with limited output of only seven numbers. In the decades after he released sporadically Moretti numbers, mostly monographs, in the magazine. In 1959, he released an issue dedicated to the sculptor Pietro De Laurentiis. In April 1963 published on the Space Structure of the essay collections and 1964 contemporary meaning of the wise words "architecture". And July 1968, an issue appeared in the essay Capogrossi dedicated to the famous Roman painter.

It was in 1954, when Moretti decided to found an art gallery, also known as space, in Rome. Moretti was also a close associate of the French art critic and theorist Michel Tapié, with whom in 1960 Moretti co-founded the International Center of Aesthetic Research in Turin, Italy, an institution that lasted until 1987, after the death of Tapié.

Moretti's interest in art is also evident from the tendency to collect works, particularly of the 17th century (Seicento) and antiquity.

=== The SGI and IRMOU ===
In 1957, he became a consultant of the Società Generale Immobiliare (SGI) for which he designed, among other things, the buildings at the head of the EUR. In the same year he collaborated with the Municipality of Rome and the Ministry of Public Works, working on projects for inter-municipal plan of Rome (never adopted) and the Archaeological Park, from which arose the controversy with Bruno Zevi and L'Espresso on the devastation of Appia.

Also in 1957, he founded the Institute for Operations Research and Applied Mathematics Urbanism (IRMOU) with the express purpose of continuing studies on the so-called "parametric" architecture, a new approach which drew on the application of mathematical theories in the design planning, and anticipated the use of computational methods that characterized the architectural design process of the 2010s.

He studied new dimensional relationships in architectural space and urban area, relating to the design of the Built Environment, with mathematical analysis, like Le Corbusier had studied the Modulor and the golden ratio. These studies were represented in 1960 with huge éclat in the press, at the XIII Triennale di Milano.

In 1958, he later went on to design major residential neighborhoods, including the CEP of Livorno. In 1958 Moretti participated with Adalberto Libera, Vittorio Cafiero, Amedeo Luccichenti and Vincenzo Monaco in the project of the Olympic Village in Rome designed for the XVII Olympiad scheduled in 1960. The design of the village won in 1961 the Prix IN/ARCH 1961 for the best achievement in the region of Lacio.

Moretti was also general project coordinator for urban planning and design of the residential district "Quartiere INCIS Decima" in Zona Z. XXVII Torrino of Rome. Design team included Vittorio Cafiero, Ignazio Guidi, Adalberto Libera. This housing compound on behalf of INCIS (Istituto nazionale per le case degli impiegati statali - National Institute for Housing of State Employees) was partly realized between 1960 and 1966.

In this period Moretti had a significant influence on the work of the urban plan of Rome, which was adopted by the City Council on 18 December 1962.

=== Moretti's Parametric Architecture ===
Two years before his death, Moretti described the concept of Parametric Architecture in an article published in Moebius. Here he called for a new architecture that was rigorous in the definition of form through the help of mathematical logic, computer techniques, and methods of operation research, and which could overcome the empirical state of current architecture.

Moretti enumerated 8 points that define his parametric architecture:

- Rejection of empirical decisions.
- Assessment of traditional phenomena as objective facts based on the interdependence of expressive, social and technical values.
- Exact and complete definition of architectural themes.
- Objective observation of all the conditioning elements (parameters) related to the architectural theme and identification of their quantitative values.
- Definition of the relationships between the values of the parameters.
- Indispensability of different skills and scientific methodologies according to the criteria of operational research to define conditioning elements and their quantities.
- Affirmation of the Architect's freedom in decision and expression, only if it does not affect the characteristics determined by the analytical investigations.
- Research of architectural forms towards a maximum, therefore definitive, exactness of relationships in their general "structure".

=== The latest works ===
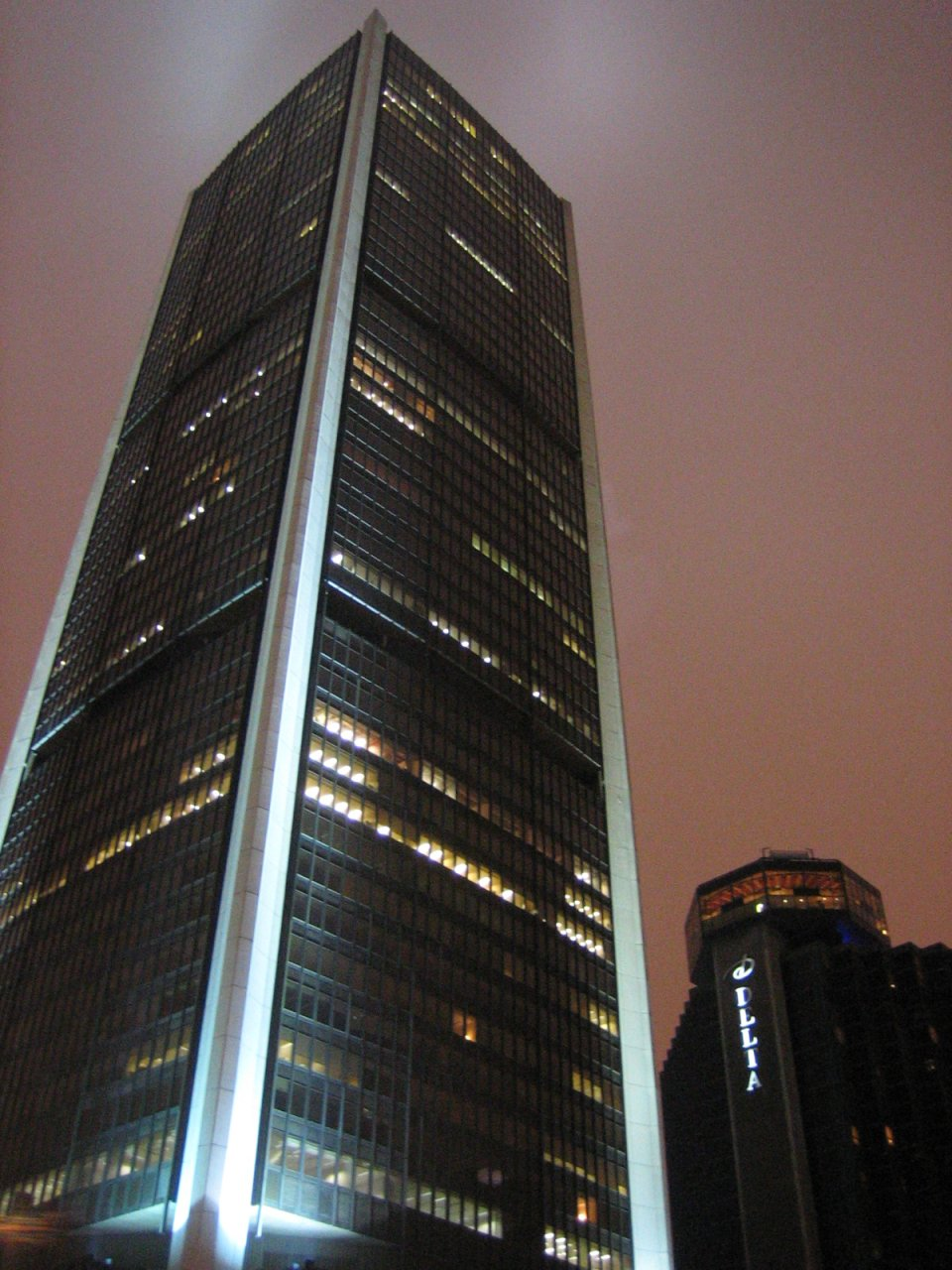
Stock Exchange Tower, Tour de la Bourse, Montreal

In 1962, on behalf of General Real Estate, he designed the Watergate complex (that gave its name to the 1972 political scandal of the same name, in the United States) in Washington, and also the Stock Exchange Tower (Tour de la Bourse) in Montreal, Quebec.

In 1963, he again won the award IN/ARCH 1963 for best achievement in the Lazio region with the study design of two twin buildings for Esso (Exxon) in the EUR in Rome. In 1964, he was awarded the Medal for meritorious school, culture and art by President Antonio Segni.

In 1965, he began a fruitful relationship with the Consulting Group Le Condotte (later merged with Italstat), taking care of the design and implementation of resettlement Thermal Boniface VIII Fiuggi, the Metropolitana di Roma in the trunk by the Termini station to Via Ottaviano in Prati, opened in 1980. As part of the work on the underground in Rome, designed the current automobile and underground bridge open in 1972, named Ponte Pietro Nenni. Another work is the underground parking for two thousand places in Villa Borghese, which opened in 1973.

Participation at the International Conference on Michelangelo's Studies (1964) with the essay "The ideal structures of Michelangelo's architecture and of Baroque" led him to try a different creative experience - creating in 1964 an hour-long biographical film about Michelangelo Buonarroti, "Michelangelo: The Man With Four Fouls", written and directed by Charles Conrad, subsidized by the Italian Government. The movie received the Lion of St. Mark's Art Film Prize at the Venice Film Festival the same year.

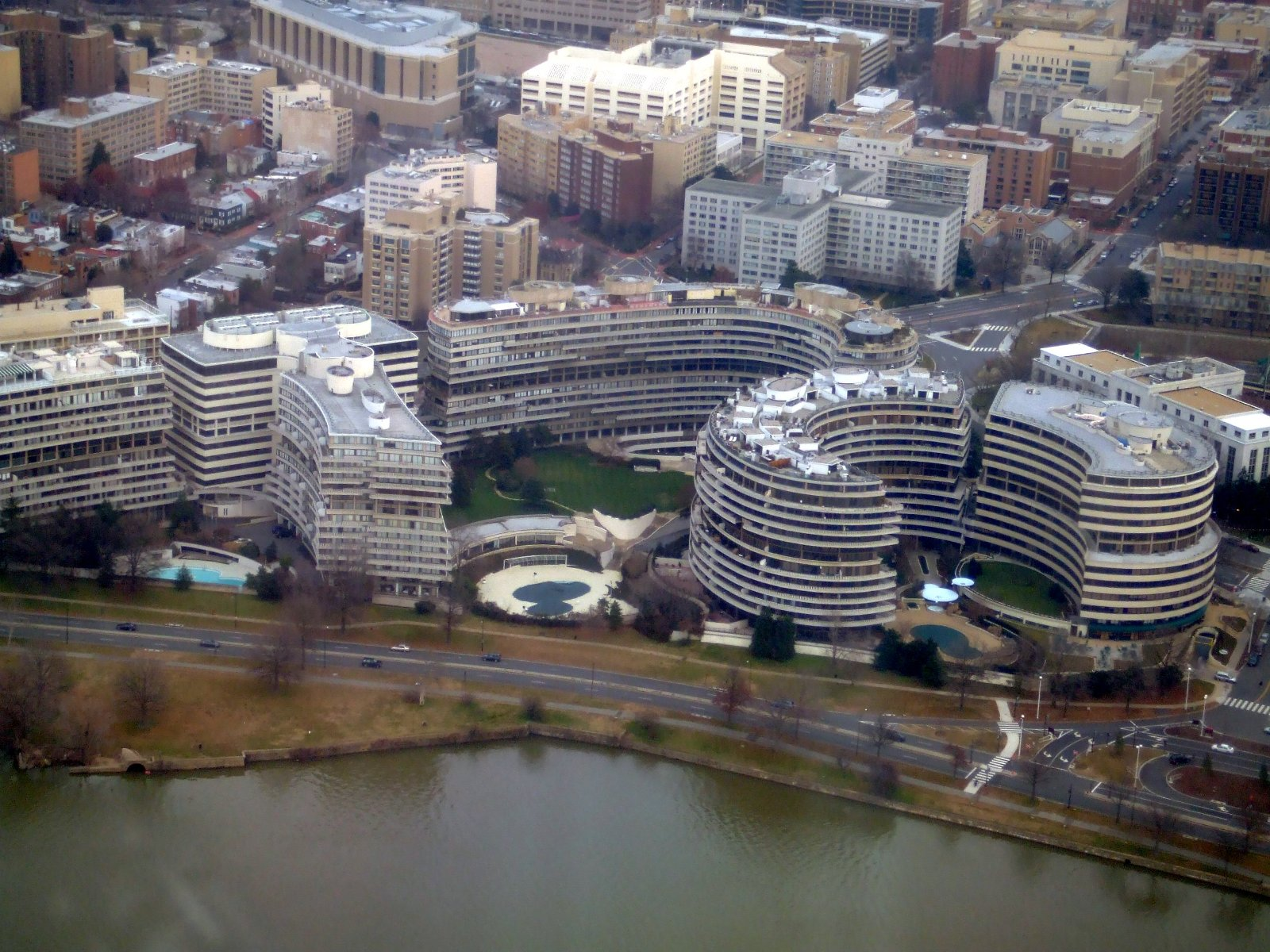
Watergate complex, Washington

In 1967–1968, he won the Antonio Feltrinelli Prize's Accademia Nazionale dei Lincei and got the task of designing a Tabgha sanctuary on Lake Tiberias on the Holy Land. The project was approved by the Holy See but the work was not started because of the delicate situation between Israel and Palestinians which soon erupted into war.

In 1968 he married Maria Teresa Albani.

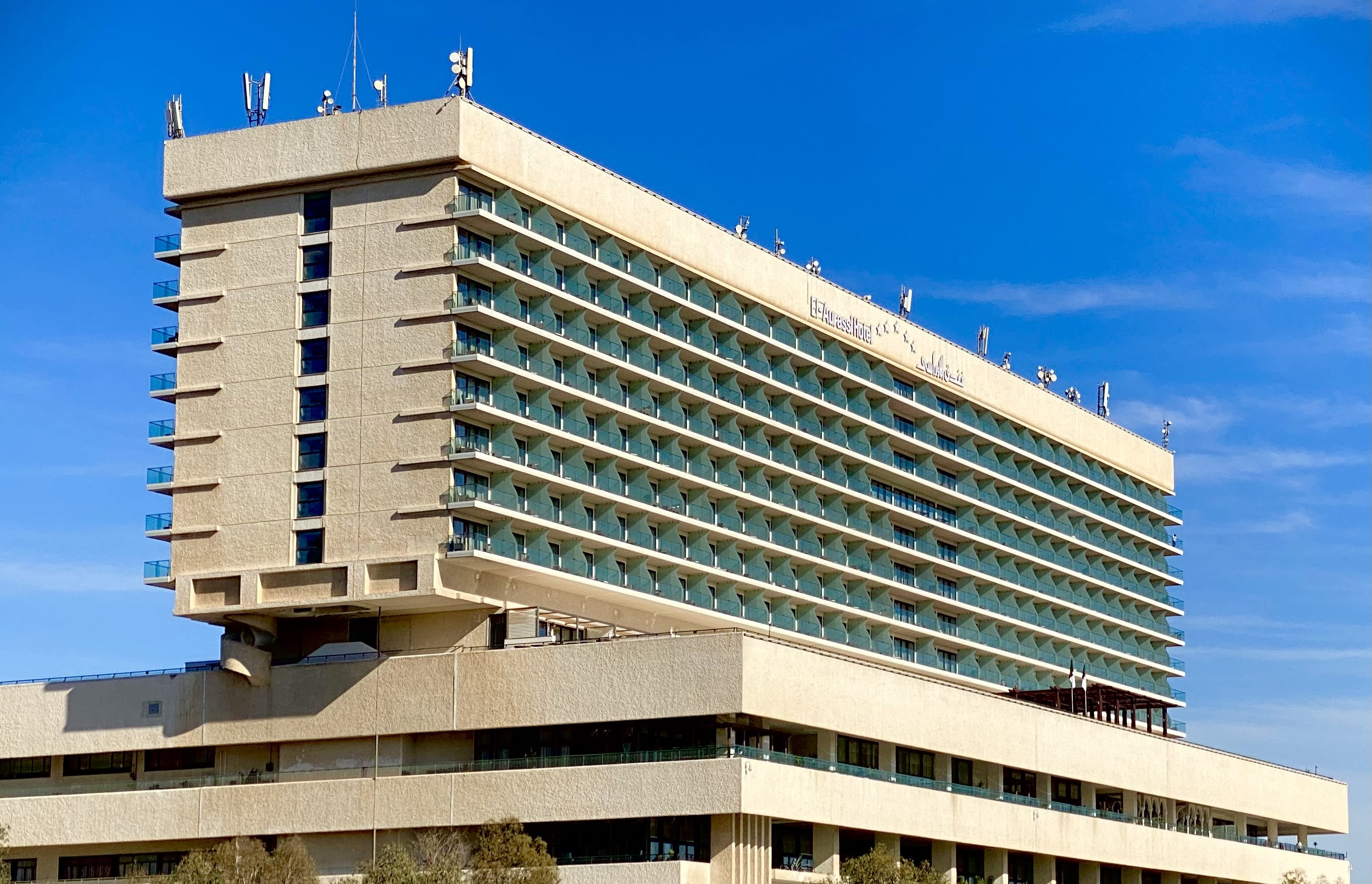
El Aurassi Hotel in Algiers (1975)

The following year, in 1969 found a fertile market for jobs in Arab countries, especially in Kuwait (where he designed the headquarters Bedouin Engineering Club and Houses) and in Algeria (Hotel El-Aurassi and Complex Club des Pins, in addition to a number of schools and residential neighborhoods).

In 1971, he designed new buildings (with Vosbeck, Vosbeck, Kendrick & Redinger), for projects of General Real Estate, including the residential center in Alexandria, Virginia on the Potomac River, a residential center in Rocquencourt by Paris, in Montreal a new skyscraper as attachment to his previous 1961 realization of the Stock Exchange Tower (Tour de la Bourse). The same year at request of the Spanish Ministry of Information and Tourism, Moretti arranged a monographic exhibition of his works in Madrid in the framework of the International exhibition of construction and public works: he presented 21 works by means of photographs, models and personally selection of materials and their fitting.

He died in 1973 from heart failure while he was in the midst of his work.

== Awards ==
- 1957 Premio Nazionale di Architettura Giovanni Gronchi, established by the Accademia di San Luca
- 1959 Premio Faggio d'Oro (Premio Vallombrosa) for activities in the field of landscape protection
- 1960 Medaglia d’oro per le professioni liberali e l’arte
- 1964 Medaglia d’oro di benemerenza della scuola, della cultura e dell’arte by President of Italy
- 1964 Elected Academician of the Accademia di San Luca
- 1964 Appointed honorary member of the American Institute of Architects
- 1967 Prix d’Excellence Design Canada
- 1968 Antonio Feltrinelli Prize, awarded once every five years by Accademia dei Lincei
