= San Felice da Cantalice a Centocelle =

Church of Saint Felix of Cantalice at Centocelle
- San Felice da Cantalice a Centocelle (in Italian); Sancti Felicis a Cantalicio ad Centumcellas (in Latin)
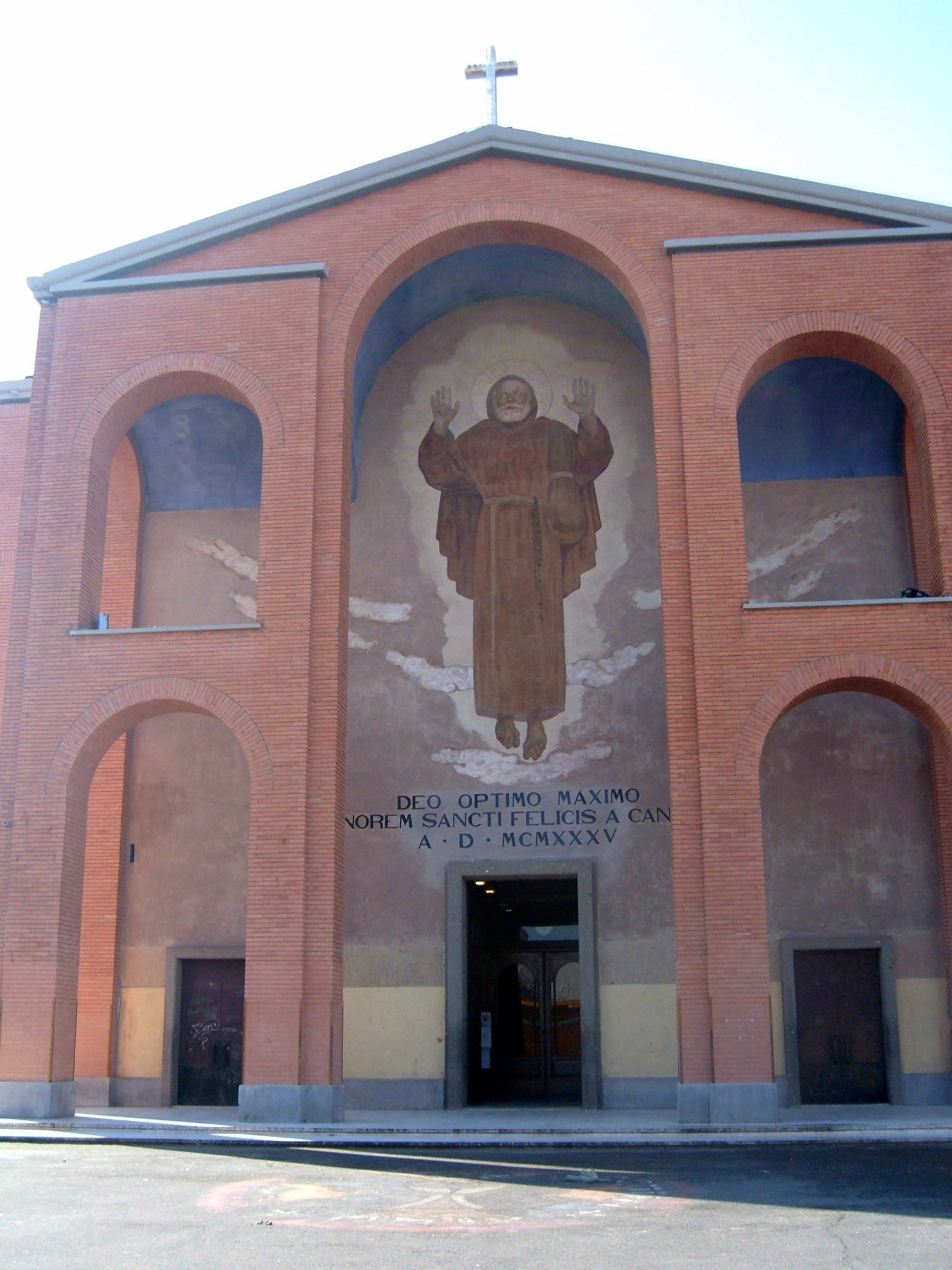
- Façade of San Felice da Cantalice a Centocelle. The Latin inscription reads: "Glory to God in the Highest. In Honour of St Felix of Cantalice. Year of Our Lord, 1935."
- Click on the map for a fullscreen view
- 41°52′36.57″N 12°33′58.65″E
- Location: Rome
- Country: Italy
- Denomination: Roman Catholic
- Tradition: Roman Rite
- Website: Official website

History
- Status: Titular church
- Dedication: Felix of Cantalice
- Consecrated: 2 October 1941

Architecture
- Architect(s): Mario Paniconi, Giulio Pediconi
- Architectural type: Church
- Style: Nouveau Italian
- Groundbreaking: 1934
- Completed: 29 March 1935

Specifications
- Capacity: 3,800 (internal)

Administration
- District: Centocelle Quarters
- Province: Vicariate of Rome

The Church of Saint Felix of Cantalice at Centocelle (Italian: San Felice da Cantalice a Centocelle, Latin: Sancti Felicis a Cantalicio ad Centumcellas, Spanish: San Féliciano de Cantalicio a Centocelle) is a Roman Catholic titular church in Rome located in the Centocelle quarter, built as a parish church by decree of Cardinal Francesco Marchetti Selvaggiani, Vicar General of Rome.

The church is referred to as a Centocelle (English: "at Centocelle") because it located at the site of a former Roman imperial cavalry barracks. On 30 April 1969, when Pope Paul VI made it a titular church for cardinals. He blessed its fresco on the Solemnity of Mary, Mother of God and World Day of Peace, 1970.

The most recent cardinal protector is Philippine Cardinal Luis Antonio Tagle, who served from 24 November 2012 to 24 May 2025. The title became pro hac vice suburbicarian when Cardinal Tagle was raised to the rank of Cardinal Bishop on 1 May 2020; he was assigned to the Suburbicarian Diocese of Albano following the election of Pope Leo XIV. The church has been administered by the Order of Friars Minor Capuchin since 1928.

On 10 March 2013, Cardinal Tagle celebrated Holy Mass with members of the Italian-Filipino communities before attending the 2013 papal conclave.

In May 2022, the parish held an exhibition of biographical and iconographic works related to Felix of Cantalice, the church's namesake and a friend of Philip Neri.

== History ==
In 1927 a large sheet metal barrack served as a liturgical hall for festive celebrations. On 14 November 1929, the Italian Marquis Achilles Muti-Bussi donated the land to the Vicariate of Rome as a gesture of goodwill for its impoverished peasants living nearby, many from the Lazio countryside.

The Capuchin friars arrived on 16 December 1930 and on 20 September of the same year the cornerstone was laid for their new Capuchin monastery. On 30 May 1932, the church itself was canonically signed and erected but the actual construction of the church began in 1934.

The original church itself was established on 29 March 1935 through the apostolic decree by Vicar General of Rome, Cardinal Francesco Marchetti Selvaggiani in his letter "Sollicitudo Omnium Ecclesiarum" (English: "We encourage the whole church"), which canonically entrusted the shrine to the Order of Friars Minor Capuchin who tended to the poor slums of the area. The church was formally recognized on 17 October 1935 by the Holy See in the Acta Apostolicae Sedis.

Several religious sisters joined in the church's charity program throughout the years, such as the Benedictine Nuns (1925), the Daughters of Charity of Saint Vincent de Paul (1935) and the Franciscan nuns (1927). The nuns assisted the Capuchin Friars in tending to the poor children, prostitutes and the unemployed.

On 1 October 1934, Cardinal Vicar Ugo Poletti drew the exact land measurements and ownership of the parish, which was enacted into civil law on 17 October 1935. On 2 October 1941, the church was consecrated by Monsignor Luigi Traglia, who was then the titular archbishop of Caesarea in Palestine, and the vice-regent of Rome. The land territory was taken from one of the sub-parishes of Saint Marcellino e Pietro ad Duas Lauros and Saint Mary of Good Counsel church.

On 1 May 2020, Pope Francis conceded to Cardinal Luis Antonio Tagle, Prefect for the Evangelization of Peoples the rank of cardinal-bishop, making the church a suburbicarian church pro hac vice. Its status as a suburbicarian church ceased in 2025 when Tagle was appointed as Cardinal Bishop of Albano by Pope Leo XIV.

== Parish ==
In 1960, Pope John XXIII visited the parish for Lenten observances. On 1 January 1970, on the occasion of the World Day of Peace, Pope Paul VI blessed the apse of the church in a ceremony televised live by RAI.

In May 2021, the parish collaborated with a nearby mosque to hold an "Ifatar of the brotherhood", during Ramadan.

== Architecture ==
The parish complex was designed by Italian architects Mario and Giulio Pediconi. The church has a typical basilican layout with columns and nave. The main façade has a polychromed modern painting by Rodolfo Villani which depicts Saint Felix of Cantalice in prayer.

=== Interior ===
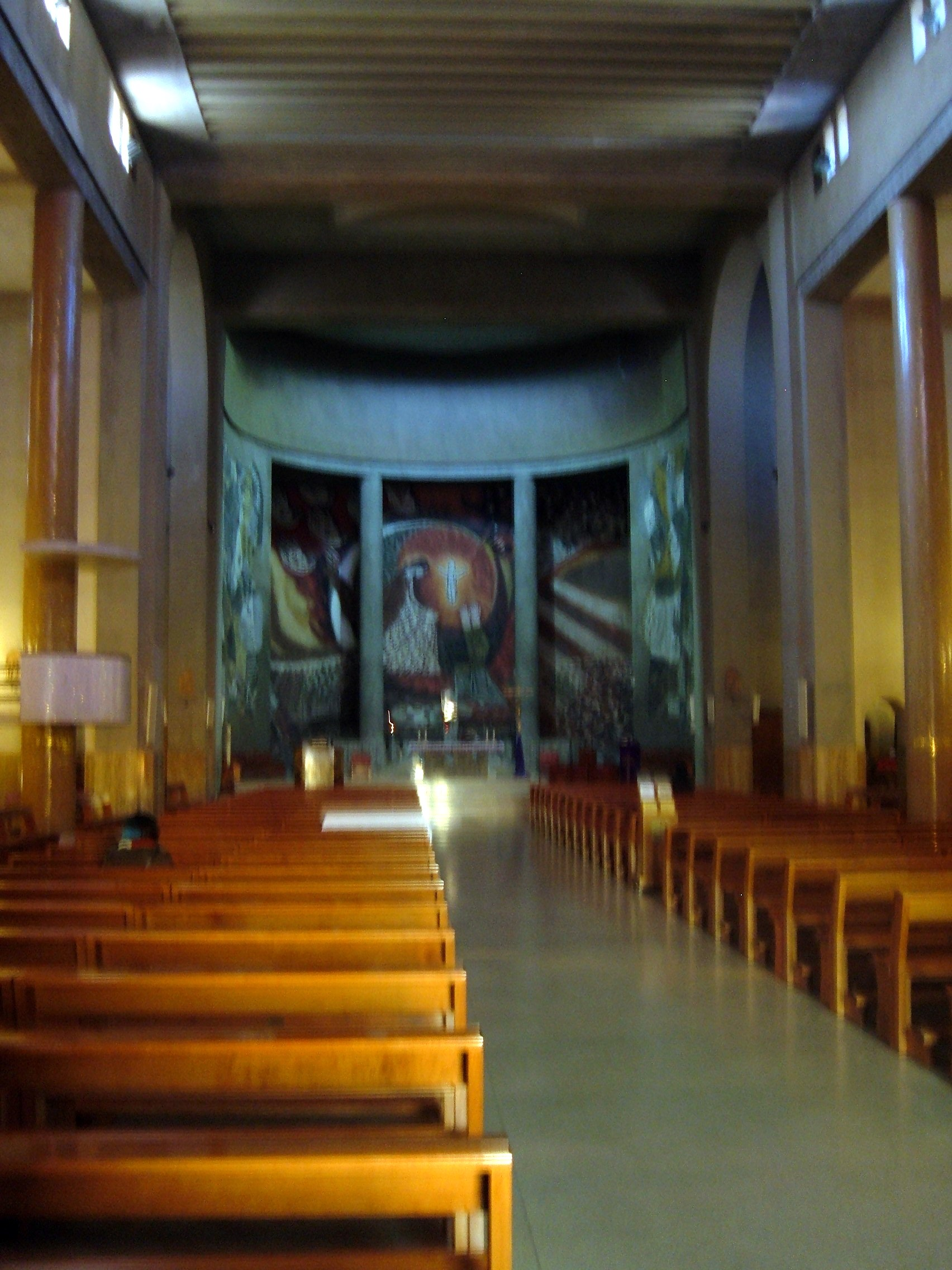
S. Felice da Cantalice

The church is decorated with works of the Franciscan Capuchin artist Ugolino da Belluno, which include the Madonna and Child with Saint Felix in the apse and the Appearance of angels and Jesus in a vision of St Francis in the transept. In July 1968, the Vicariate of Rome approved the fresco in the apse of the church featuring Saint Felix of Cantalice, its namesake patron saint made by Father Ugolino from Belluno (born Silvio Alessandri, born 15 December 1919). At the time, the fresco was heavily criticized for its polychrome colours, the poor natural lighting, and the manner in which it was painted on the wall of 480 square meters.

The fresco in the apse features the Madonna as Virgin of the Flowers, wearing a robe of lilies while handing down the Child Jesus to Saint Felix, hooded and prostrate. Below are images of children victims of violence: the Jewish children of Terezín who were exterminated by the Nazi authorities, while a newspaper image of Mario Dominici is featured, the boy found dead in the area during World War II as a result of Nazi Anti-Semitism. It also features cherubic angels, and zodiac sign constellations which tell the story of creation. Other scenes of the frescoes involve morality tales, anti-greed and anti-pornographic sentiments, as well as several miraculous scenes from the life of Saint Felix of Cantalice.

The church appears in a scene from Pier Paolo Pasolini's 1961 film Accattone.

== List of Cardinals ==
- Stephen Kim Sou-hwan of Korea – Cardinal-Priest by Pope Paul VI – (30 April 1969 – 16 February 2009)
- Luis Antonio Tagle of the Philippines – Cardinal-Priest by Pope Benedict XVI – (24 November 2012 – 1 May 2020) – Cardinal-Bishop by Pope Francis – (1 May 2020 – 24 May 2025, reassigned to Suburbicarian Diocese of Albano)

== Sources ==
- C. Rendina, Le Chiese di Roma, Newton & Compton Editori, Milano 2000
- C. Cerchiai, Quartiere XIX. Prenestino-Centocelle, in AA.VV, I quartieri di Roma, Newton & Compton Editori, Roma 2006
