= Giannella De Marco =

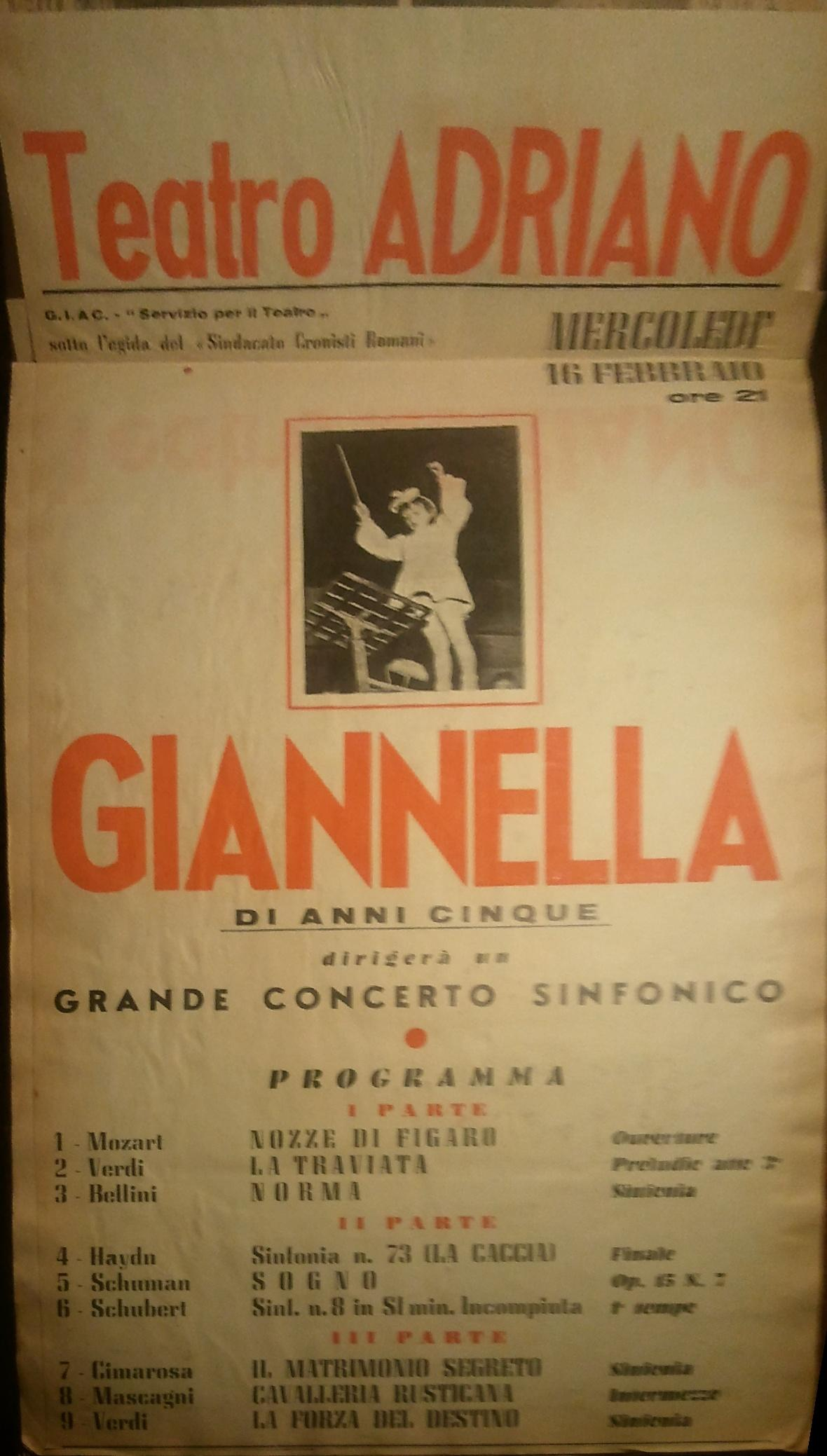
Poster for the second concert with Giannella De Marco conducting, at Teatro Adriano di Roma, 16 January 1949

Giannella De Marco (Rome, 25 June 1943 – Rome, 24 January 2010) was an Italian orchestral conductor; she was a child prodigy who from the age of five conducted symphony orchestras in concerts in Europe and South America.

Giannella De Marco is often considered to have been the youngest orchestral conductor in the history of music. She began her artistic career in orchestral conducting in the late 1940s at the age of five. From the age of seven, she went on—the first and only person in the history of music to do so at such an age—to prepare and conduct operatic works.

== Biography ==
Giannella De Marco's talent was introduced to the world on 1 December 1948, via the International News Service and United Press, which circulated photographs and reports of her debut concert at the Teatro Massimo in Pescara. There, at five years old, she conducted, among other pieces, the overture to Giuseppe Verdi's La forza del destino. Her major breakthrough occurred in Rome during her second concert, held on 16 February 1949, at the Teatro Adriano, where she conducted the Orchestra dell'Accademia Nazionale di Santa Cecilia.

In 1950 she made a concert tour of Brazil, and conducted the Orchestre Lamoureux in Paris,

In March 1953 Giannella De Marco visited the UK and conducted the London Philharmonic Orchestra, firstly in Manchester then on 9 March at the Royal Albert Hall, in what was described as her 123rd conducting engagement.

Photographs dated to July 1957 show her conducting an opera in Bergamo. Photographs in an archive dated to 18 December 1957 show her conducting an orchestra and choir at the Teatro delle Vittorie on 18 November 1957.

Alongside her conducting career, she pursued and completed her academic studies under the guidance of some of Italy's most prominent maestros—most notably Victor de Sabata. Her education included studies at the San Pietro a Majella Conservatory in Naples with Aladino Di Martino, the Niccolò Piccinni Conservatory in Bari with Nino Rota, and the Conservatorio Santa Cecilia in Rome, where she studied piano with Rina Rossi, Carlo Zecchi, and Vera Gobbi Belcredi; singing with Ines Alfani Tellini; and orchestral conducting with Franco Ferrara.

Giannella De Marco conducted major international orchestras in theaters all over the world. Performances have taken place at the Teatro Colón in Buenos Aires; the Municipal Theaters of Rio de Janeiro and São Paulo in Brazil; in Spain—in Madrid (with the Madrid Symphony Orchestra), Valencia, and Barcelona; in Rome—with the orchestras of the Accademia di Santa Cecilia and the Teatro dell'Opera; in Naples—with the "A. Scarlatti" Orchestra for RAI; in Bari—at the Teatro Petruzzelli; in Milan—at the Castello Sforzesco with the Orchestra of Teatro alla Scala; in Catania—at the Teatro Bellini; in Florence—with the Orchestra del Maggio Musicale Fiorentino; as well as in Bergamo, Ravenna (Teatro Alighieri), Bologna (Teatro Comunale and Teatro Duse), Trieste, Benevento, Brescia, Pescara, Macerata, and Genoa (Politeama Margherita). International engagements have included the Odeon of Herodes Atticus in Athens; the Coliseu in Lisbon—where, at the age of nine, she conducted Giuseppe Verdi's Aida; the Salle Pleyel in Paris—with the Orchestre des Concerts Lamoureux; cities in Germany such as Düsseldorf, Dortmund, and Cologne; Manchester; London—at the Royal Albert Hall with the London Philharmonic Orchestra; and the BBC—where she conducted a ballet featuring Alicia Markova.

In later life she settled into piano teaching at the Conservatorio di Santa Cecilia, at least until 1995.
