= Valco San Paolo =

Valco San Paolo is an urban area 11B of Rome City Hall (Former City Hall Rome XI) of Rome Capital. It extends to Q. X Ostiense, occupying a river Tiber river.

== Landmarks ==
- INA-Casa and IACP district, between Via San Paolo, Via Corinto, via Efeso and via Filomene. Buildings of the 20th century (1949–50). 41.853076 ° N 12.474327 ° E

Complex INA-Home and IACP social housing with four stellar towers. Projects by architects Mario De Renzi, Saverio Muratori, Eugenio Montuori, Mario Paniconi, Giulio Pediconi and Fernando Puccioni.

- St. Paul's Basilica outside the walls, on Via Ostiense. Patriarchal Basilica.
