= San Gregorio VII =

Church of Saint Gregory VII
- Chiesa di San Gregorio VII (in Italian); S. Gregorii VII (in Latin)
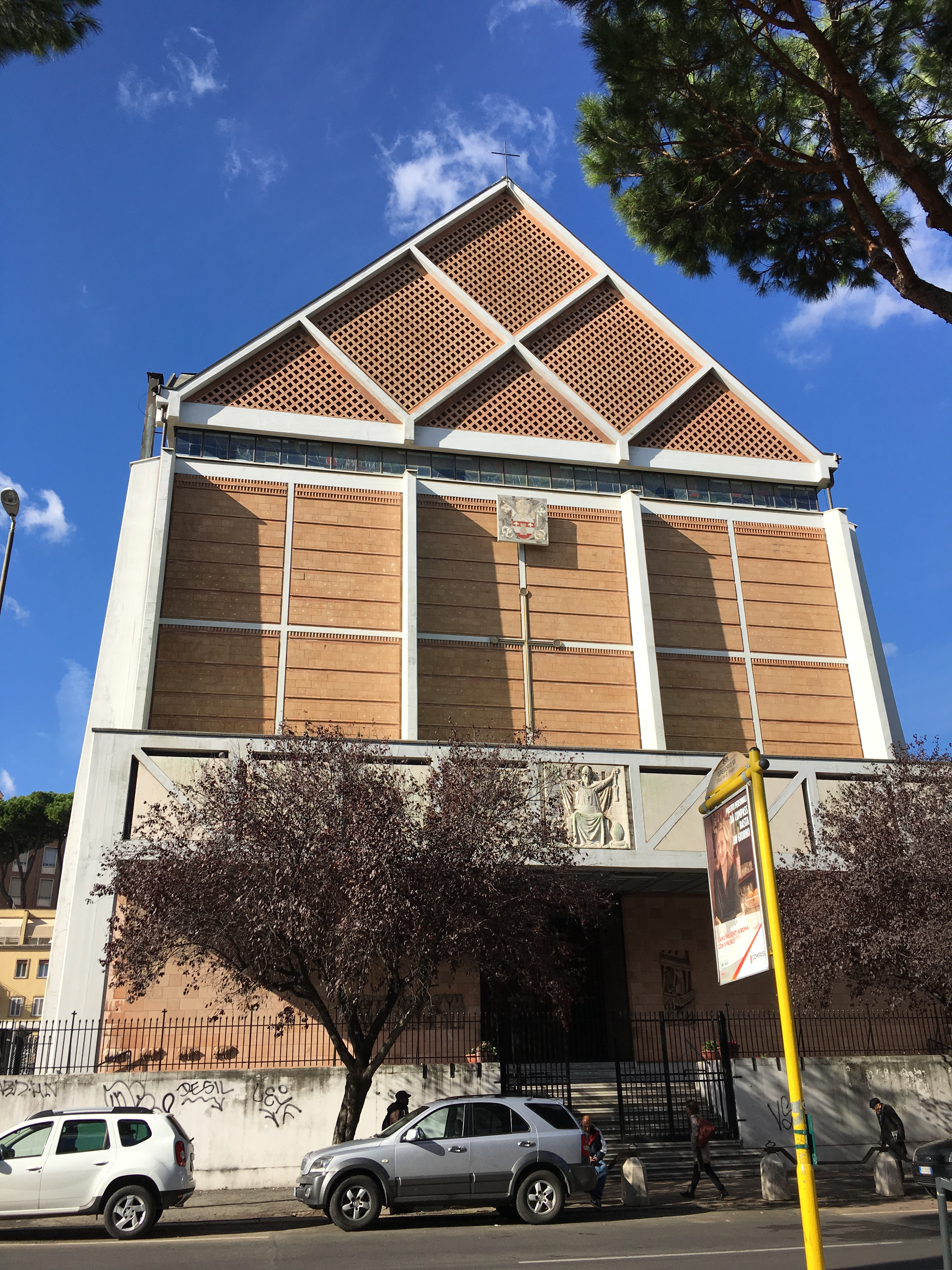
- Exterior of the church
- Click on the map for a fullscreen view
- 41°53′53.39″N 12°27′0.43″E
- Location: Via Gregorio VII, 6, Rome
- Country: Italy
- Denomination: Roman Catholic
- Tradition: Roman Rite
- Website: Official website

History
- Status: Titular church
- Dedication: Pope Gregory VII
- Consecrated: 1961

Architecture
- Architect(s): Mario Paniconi, Giulio Pediconi
- Architectural type: Church
- Groundbreaking: 1958
- Completed: 1961

Specifications
- Length: 66 metres (217 ft)
- Width: 35 metres (115 ft)

The Church of Saint Gregory VII (Italian: Chiesa di San Gregorio VII), also called San Gregorio Settimo, is a Roman Catholic parish church on the Via del Cottolengo (Via Gregorio VII) in Rome dedicated to Pope Saint Gregory VII (r. 1073–1085). It was built by Mario Paniconi and Giulio Pediconi from 1960 to 1961, to serve a parish erected by Pope Pius XII in 1952. Its roof is held up by 10 concrete piers, and is structurally independent of the walls, which end before they reach the roof (the empty space between them being filled with glass). It is a parish church, served by Franciscans; in the crypt is a depiction of the Life of St Francis of Assisi in an unusual stone inlay technique. San Gregorio VII has been a titular church since 1969. The current Cardinal Priest of the Titulus Chiesa di San Gregorio VII is Cardinal Cleemis, the Major Archbishop of Trivandrum.

== Cardinal-priests of San Gregorio VII ==
- Eugênio de Araújo Sales (1969–2012)
- Baselios Cleemis Thottunkal (since 2012)
