= Mario Paniconi =

Italian architect and urban planner (1904–1973)

- Born: 1 May 1904; Rome, Kingdom of Italy
- Died: 24 September 1973 (aged 69); Frascati, Lazio, Italy
- Occupations: Architect, urban planner

Mario Paniconi (1 May 1904 – 24 September 1973) was an Italian architect and urban planner, active from the 1930s to the post–World War II period, best known for his long professional partnership with Giulio Pediconi.

== Life and career ==
Born in Rome to a family of architects, Paniconi graduated in architecture in 1929, presenting a project for the new Fonte Anticolana complex in Fiuggi. Shortly thereafter he began teaching at the Regia Scuola di Ingegneria and later at the School of Architecture in Rome, becoming professor in architectural composition in 1952. During his university years he met Giulio Pediconi, with whom he formed a lifelong professional partnership. The Paniconi–Pediconi studio, established in 1930, became one of the most active architectural practices in Rome, though it retained a deliberately artisanal scale.

Paniconi was involved in several architectural competitions in the 1930s, including projects for the E42 (Esposizione Universale di Roma), and collaborated with leading figures such as Giovanni Muzio and Luigi Moretti. He was among the founders of the RAMI (Raggruppamento Architetti Moderni Italiani), which sought to mediate between the principles of the Modern Movement and Italian architectural tradition. He also contributed to journals such as Architettura and Prospettive (founded by Curzio Malaparte), and was a founding member of the National Institute of Urban Planning (INU) in 1934.

Although active during the Fascist period, Paniconi maintained a certain distance from overt ideological positions, focusing instead on typological research, material expressiveness, and continuity with historical forms.

Paniconi served as president of the Order of Architects of Rome (1948–49) and was appointed member of the Accademia di San Luca in 1963. He died suddenly on 24 September 1973 in Frascati.

== Works ==
Among his most notable works, often designed with Pediconi, are:

- The fountain at the Foro Italico in Rome (1935).
- The Umberto I Italian Lyceum in Thessaloniki (1933–34).
- Residential buildings in Latina (1938).
- The exedras for INA and INPS at the EUR district in Rome.
- Postwar INA-Casa housing projects in Rome (Tuscolano, Valco San Paolo).
- Numerous ecclesiastical buildings, including the church of San Felice da Cantalice (Rome, 1934–35), Santo Stefano Protomartire (Porto Santo Stefano, 1945–50), Santi Cuori di Gesù e Maria (Rome, 1947–55), San Gregorio VII (Rome, 1962), and San Giuseppe Cafasso (Rome, 1968).
- The headquarters of the Società Generale Immobiliare in Catania.
- The Ministry of Posts at EUR, Rome.

== Archive ==
His archive, comprising nearly 200 projects, is preserved at the Central Archives of the State in Rome and has been declared of significant historical interest on 16 November 1998. In 2016, a collection of 495 drawings and 856 photographs and documents relating to 36 projects (1925–1966) was placed on long-term loan at the Architecture Archives Center of MAXXI.

== Sources ==
- Capanna, Alessandra (2014). "PANICONI, Mario". Dizionario Biografico degli Italiani. Vol. 80. Rome: Treccani. pp. 769–773.
- Muntoni, Alessandra (1987). Lo studio Paniconi-Pediconi 1934–1984. Rome: Officina Edizioni.
- Bizzotto, R. (1983). 50 anni di professione. Rome: Kappa.
