= Felix of Cantalice =

Capuchin friar and Roman Catholic saint

Saint Felix of Cantalice OFMCAP
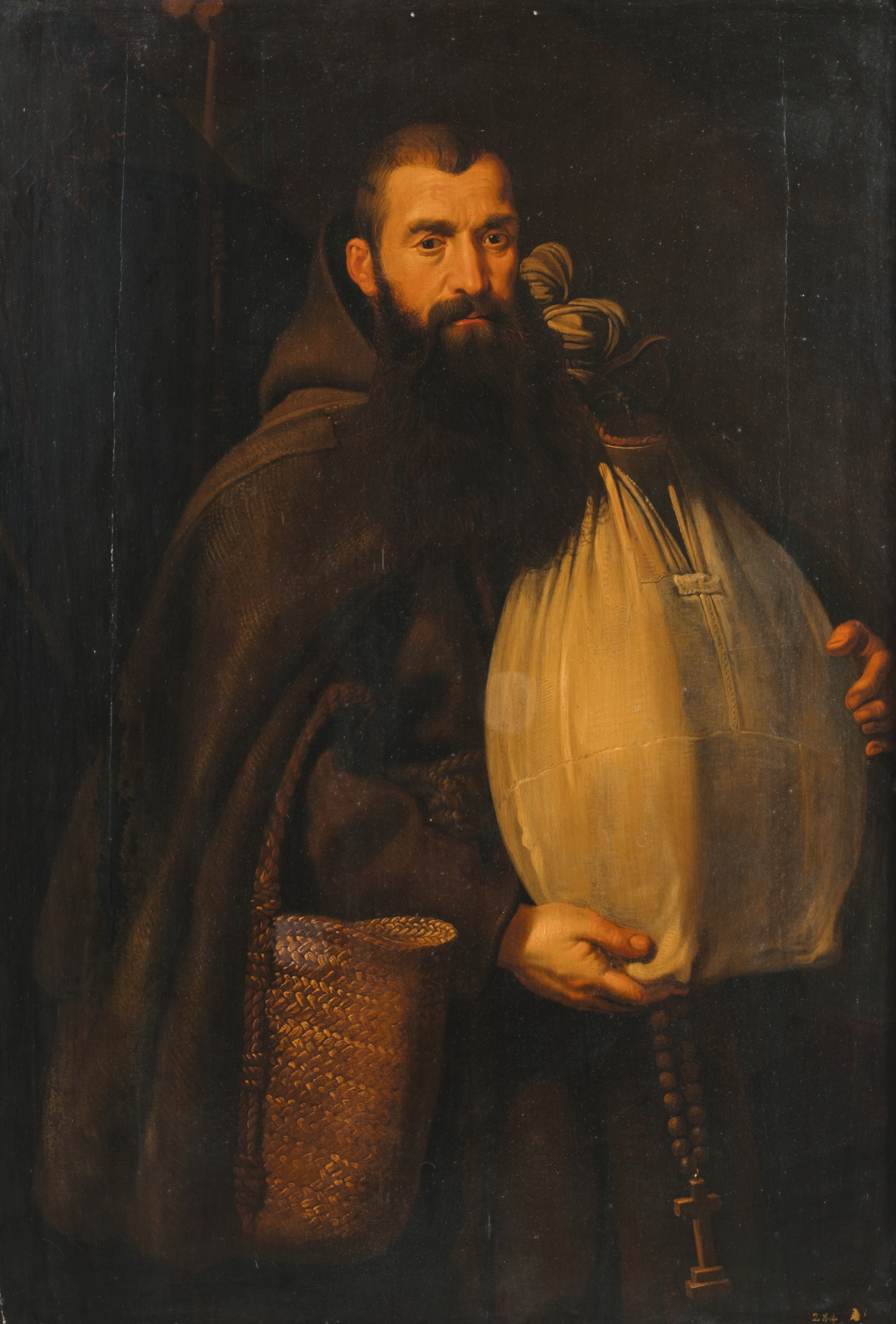
- Portrait by circle of Peter Paul Rubens

Friar
- Born: 18 May 1515; Cantalice, Papal States
- Died: 18 May 1587 (aged 72); Rome, Papal States
- Venerated in: Catholic Church
- Beatified: 1 October 1625 by Urban VIII
- Canonized: 22 May 1712 by Clement XI
- Major shrine: Santa Maria della Concezione dei Cappuccini
- Feast: 18 May
- Attributes: Capuchin habit; holding the Christ Child or a filled sack
- Patronage: Spello

Felix of Cantalice, OFMCap (Italian: Felice da Cantalice; 18 May 1515 – 18 May 1587) was an Italian Capuchin friar of the 16th century. Canonized by Pope Clement XI in 1712, he was the first Capuchin friar to be named a saint. He worked as a shepherd and farmhand until he was twenty-eight. His task as a Capuchin was to beg alms for the friars. So successful was he that Brother Felix was able to extend his collections to assist the poor.

== Life ==
Felix Porri was the third of four sons born to Santi and Santa Porri. They were poor farmers. At about the age of ten, Felix was hired out first as a shepherd to a family at Cittàducale, where he later worked as a farm hand. Until the age of twenty-eight he worked as a farm laborer and shepherd. He developed the habit of praying while he worked. One day, while plowing a field, something spooked the oxen and he fell. He was trampled, the plow passing over his body. However, he arose uninjured, and in gratitude immediately entered a Capuchin monastery.

Toward the end of autumn 1543, Felix entered the newly founded Capuchin friars as a lay brother at the Citta Ducale friary in the municipality of Anticoli Corrado. It is said that he was well noted for his piety. In 1547 he was sent to Rome as quaestor of the Capuchin Friary of St. Bonaventure, where he spent his remaining 40 years begging alms to help in the friars' work of aiding the sick and the poor.

In Rome, Brother Felix became a familiar sight, wandering barefoot through the streets, with a sack slung over his shoulders, knocking on doors to seek donations. He received permission from his superiors to help the needy, especially widows with many children. It is said that his begging sack was as bottomless as his heart. Brother Felix blessed all benefactors and all those he met with a humble "Deo Gratias!" (thanks be to God!), causing many to refer to him as "Brother Deo Gratias". Felix was so successful in his work that during the famine of 1580, the political leader of Rome asked the Capuchins if they would 'lend' Felix to them so he could collect food and provisions for the entire city. The Capuchins agreed and Felix embraced his new task.

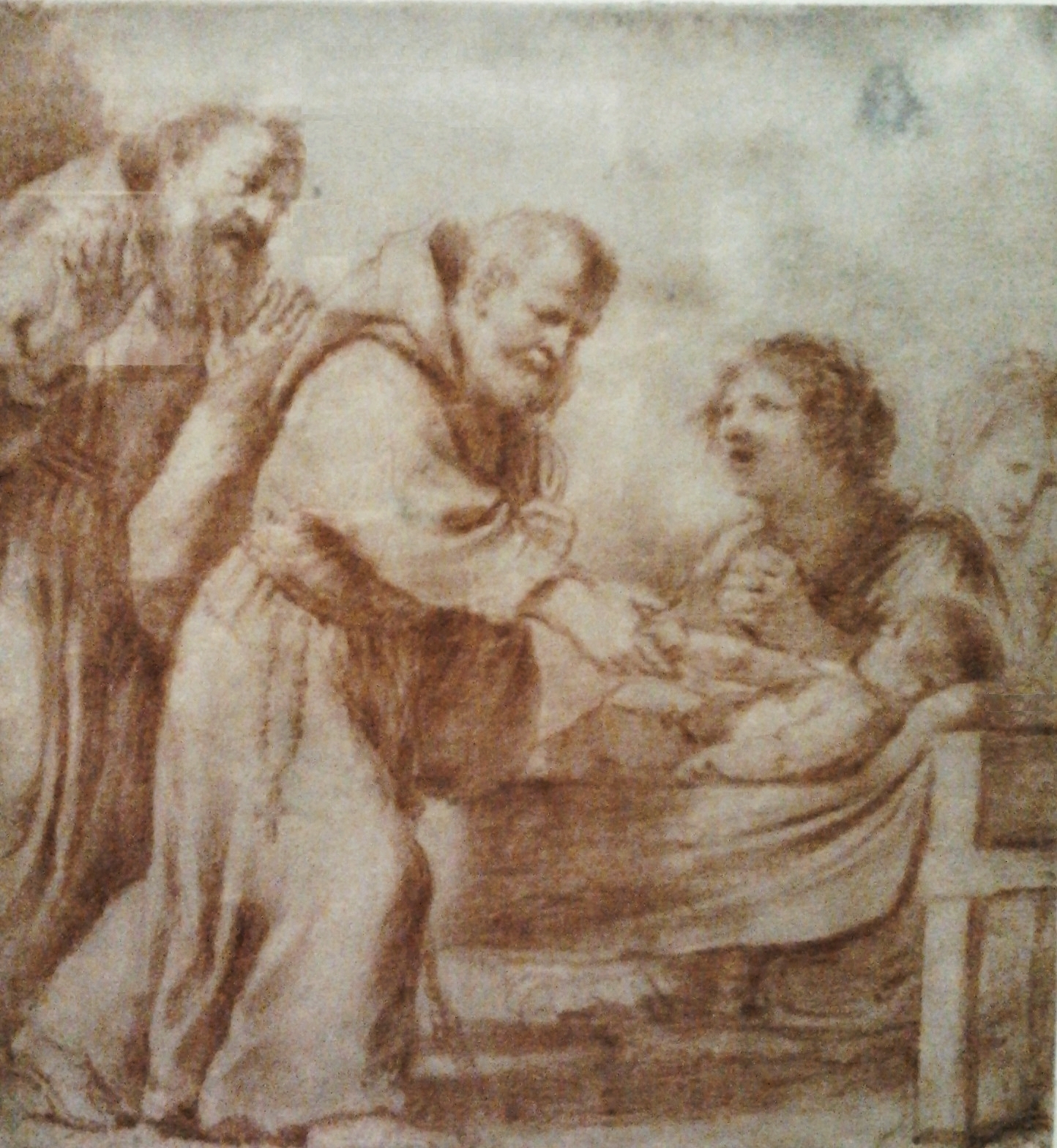
Felix of Cantalice reviving a dead child by Guercino

He preached in the street, rebuked corrupt politicians and officials, and exhorted young men to stop leading dissolute lives. He also composed simple teaching canticles, and arranged for children to gather in groups to sing them as a way to teach them the catechism.

The plain-spoken Brother Felix was a good friend of St. Philip Neri and an acquaintance of Charles Borromeo. Felix developed a reputation as a healer. As he got older, his superior ordered him to wear sandals to protect his health. Cardinal Santori had offered to use his influence to have the elderly Felix relieved of the difficult task of questing, but Felix refused.

Felix died in Rome in 1587 on his 72nd birthday and was buried in the crypt of the Church of Santa Maria della Concezione dei Cappuccini.

== Veneration ==
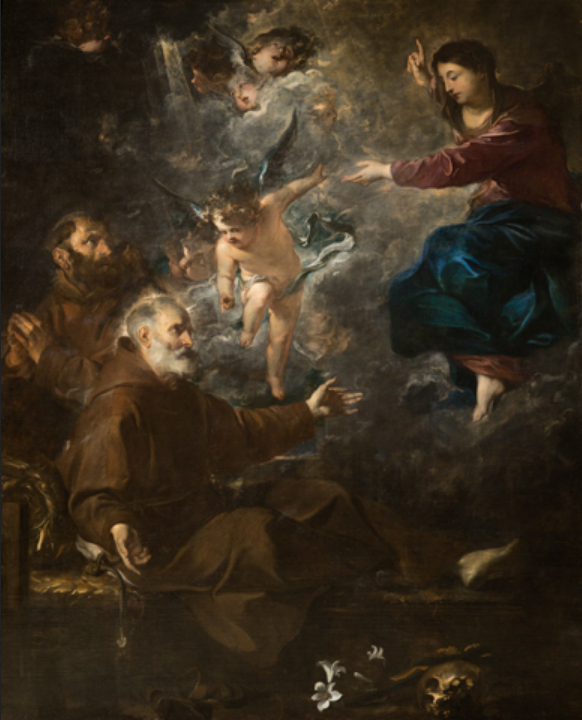
The apparition of Mary to Saint Felix of Cantalicia by Gillis Backereel

He was beatified on 1 October 1625 by Pope Urban VIII and canonized on 22 May 1712 by Pope Clement XI. The Bull of Canonization, Rationi Congruit, was published by Pope Benedict XIII on 4 June 1724.

His feast day is celebrated on the Calendar of Saints of the Franciscan Order on May 18.

A titular church in Rome was erected in his honor, San Felice da Cantalice a Centocelle

In 19th-century Poland, the Felician Sisters, a religious congregation of Franciscan Sisters of the Third Order Regular, was founded to care for the poor and adopted him as their patron saint.

=== Iconography ===
Felix is usually represented in art as holding in his arms the Infant Jesus, because of a vision he is said to have had, when the Virgin appeared to him and placed Jesus in his arms. Pope John Paul II observed that Felix is "shown bearing the Infant Jesus in his arms because in bearing the burdens of the needy he had carried in his arms the poor Christ himself."

== See also ==
- Franciscan Sisters of St. Felix of Cantalice
- List of Catholic saints
