= Ponte Duca d'Aosta =

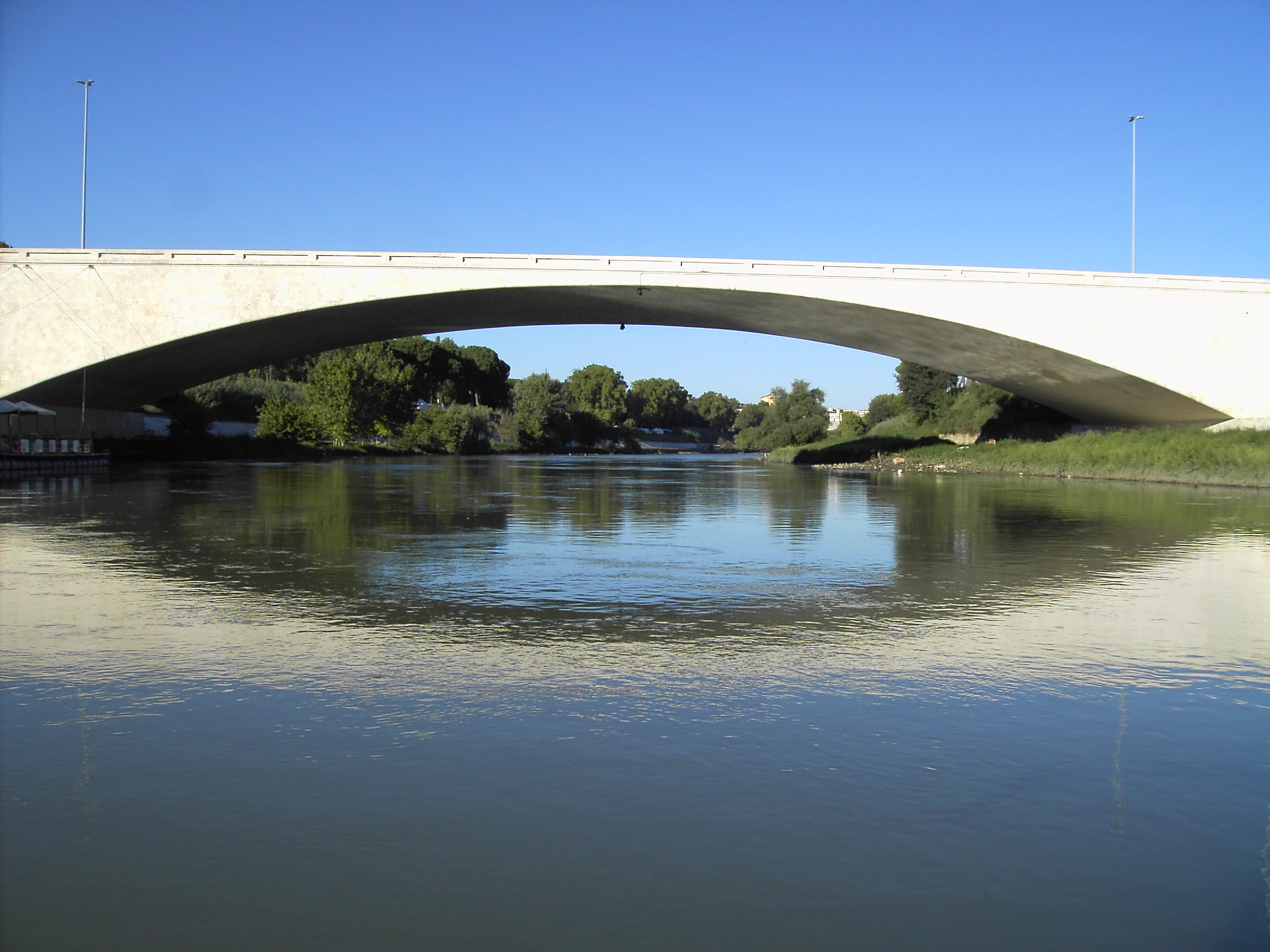
- Ponte Duca d'Aosta, Rome
- Coordinates: 41°55′53″N 12°27′38″E
- Crosses: River Tiber
- Locale: Rome, Flaminio and Della Vittoria Quarters, Italy

Characteristics
- Material: Reinforced concrete
- Total length: 220 m (721.8 ft)
- Width: 30 m (98.4 ft)

History
- Designer: Vincenzo Fasolo (architect), Antonio Martinelli (engineer)
- Construction start: 1936
- Construction end: 1939
- Opened: 26 March 1939

Location
- Interactive map of Ponte Duca d'Aosta

Ponte Duca d'Aosta is a bridge that links Lungotevere Flaminio to Piazza Lauro De Bosis, in Rome (Italy), in the Flaminio and Della Vittoria quarters.

== Description ==
The bridge, dedicated to Prince Emanuele Filiberto of Savoy-Aosta, 2nd Duke of Aosta, was designed by architect Vincenzo Fasolo; the building started in 1936 and the inauguration took place on 26 March 1939.

The reinforced concrete bridge has a single arch and is 220 m (722 ft) long and 30 m (98 ft) wide; at both extremities are placed two pairs of shafts, whose façades are decorated with high-relieves by the Tuscan sculptor Vico Consorti, illustrating war scenes on the rivers Isonzo, Tagliamento, Sile and Adige.

The bridge links the Flaminio quarter to the Foro Italico.
