= World Day of Peace =

Annual celebration by the Catholic Church

- Observed by: All world
- Celebrations: Multiple world wide events
- Date: 1 January
- Next time: 1 January 2027
- Duration: 24 hours
- Frequency: Annual
- Related to: Catholic Church

The World Day of Peace is an annual celebration by the Catholic Church, dedicated to universal peace, held on 1 January, the Solemnity of Mary, Mother of God. Pope Paul VI established it in 1967, being inspired by the encyclical Pacem in Terris of Pope John XXIII and with reference to his own encyclical Populorum Progressio. The day was first observed on 1 January 1968.

World Day of Peace often has been an occasion on which the Popes made magisterial declarations of social doctrine. Pope Paul VI and Pope John Paul II made important declarations on the Day in each year of their pontificates regarding the United Nations, human rights, women's rights, labor unions, economic development, the right to life, international diplomacy, peace in the Holy Land (including Israel and Palestine), globalization, and terrorism.

In England and Wales, "Peace Sunday" is traditionally observed on the Second Sunday of Ordinary Time, which is the Sunday occurring between 14 and 20 January, inclusive. The British branch of the Pax Christi movement prepares suggested material for it annually.
