= Vincenzo Fasolo =

Italian architect (1885–1969)

- Born: 5 July 1885; Split, Kingdom of Dalmatia
- Died: 6 November 1969 (aged 84); Rome, Italy
- Occupations: Architect, engineer, urban planner

Vincenzo Fasolo (5 July 1885 – 6 November 1969) was an Italian architect, engineer, urban planner, and architectural historian.

== Life and career ==
Trained in Rome under Giovanni Battista Milani and Gustavo Giovannoni, he developed a positivist approach to historiography combined with a visionary design method rooted in a scenographic and eclectic reinterpretation of architectural tradition.

From 1925 to 1961, he taught at the Faculty of Architecture in Rome, serving as dean from 1954 to 1960. Alongside his academic career, Fasolo carried out an extensive body of architectural work, primarily in Rome. Notable projects include the Casa delle Civette at Villa Torlonia (1916–19), Liceo Mamiani (1924), the fire station in Via Marmorata (1926–28), the Ponte Duca d'Aosta (1936–39), and various schools and civic buildings.

As head of the Design Office of the Municipality of Rome (1912–36), Fasolo played an active role in urban planning, advocating for a "Romanist" vision aligned with Giovannoni's approach, and opposing the emerging modernist trends. A member of the academic group La Burbera, he participated in key urban debates of the 1920s and 1930s but was gradually sidelined from major Fascist-era projects.

From 1948 to 1969, he served as architect for the Fabric of Saint Peter. He was president of the Accademia di San Luca (1957–59) and founder of the journal Quaderni di architettura (1953). A prolific author, Fasolo studied Michelangelo, Piranesi, and ancient architecture, which he regarded as essential to contemporary design practice.

== Sources ==
- De Guttry, Irene (1989). Guida di Roma moderna dal 1870 ad oggi. Rome: De Luca. p. 126.
- Paolo Portoghesi, ed. (1969). Dizionario enciclopedico di architettura e urbanistica. Vol. II. Rome: Gangemi. p. 316.
- Rossi, Piero Ostilio (1984). Roma. Guida all'architettura moderna (1909-1984). Bari: Laterza. pp. 59, 99, 105–107.
- Sgarbi, Vittorio (1991). Dizionario dei monumenti italiani e dei loro autori. Roma dal Rinascimento ai giorni nostri. Milan: Bompiani. pp. 106–107.
- Terranova, Antonino (1995). "FASOLO, Vincenzo". Dizionario Biografico degli Italiani. Vol. 45. Istituto dell'Enciclopedia Italiana.
