= Teatro Adriano =

Coordinates: 41.9059°N 12.4698°E

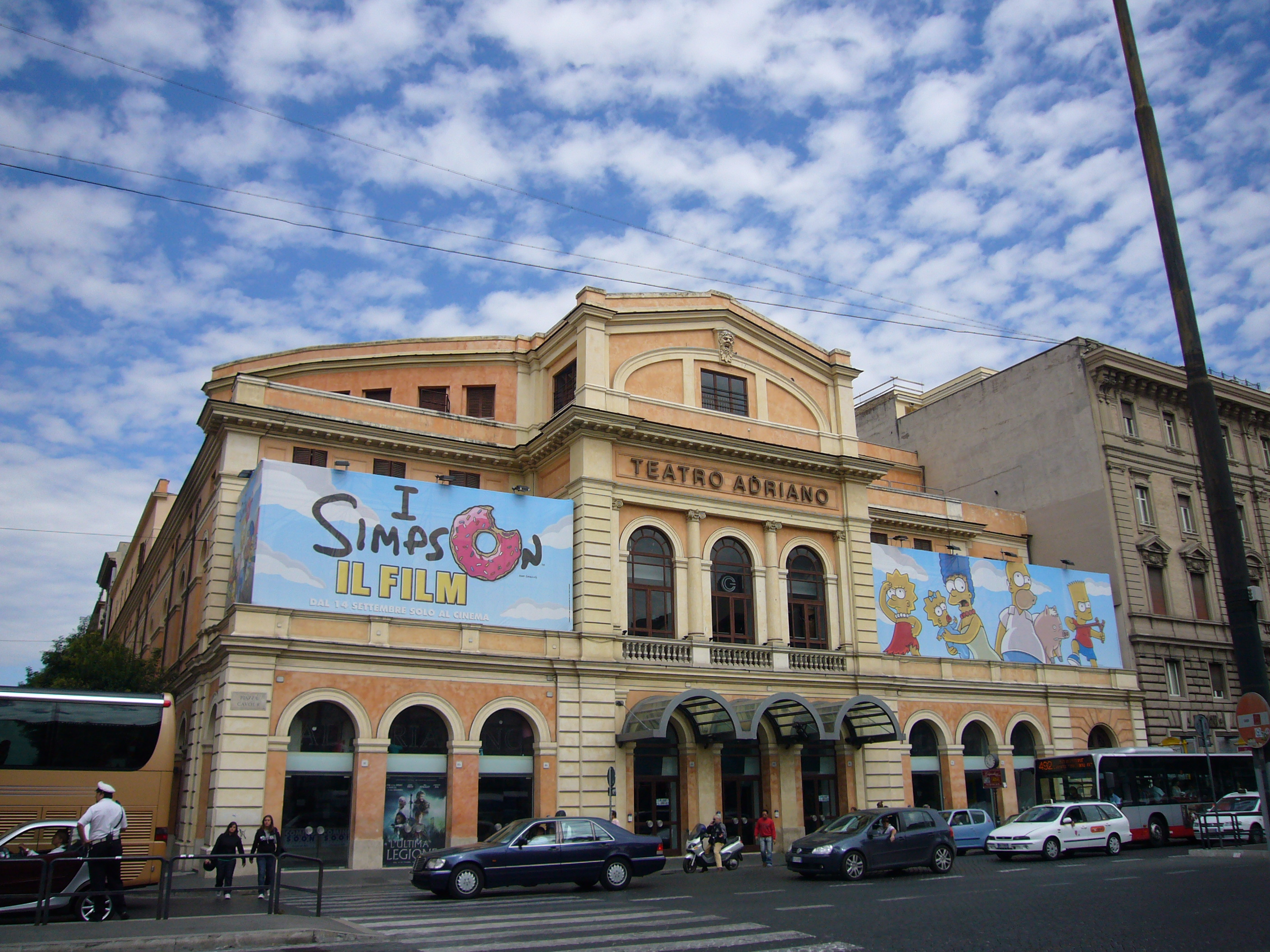
Teatro Adriano

The Teatro Adriano (i.e. "Adriano Theater"), also known as Politeama Adriano and Cinema Adriano, is a cinema and former theatre located in Piazza Cavour, Rome, Italy.

It was built by Pio Gallas and Romeo Bisini on a project by architect Luigi Rolland (the father of Luigi Moretti) and inaugurated on 1 June 1898 with a representation of the Amilcare Ponchielli's opera La Gioconda conducted by Edoardo Mascheroni.

The Beatles played four shows here in June 1965 during their European Tour.
