= Giulio Pediconi =

Italian architect and urban planner (1906–1999)

- Born: 31 January 1906; Rome, Kingdom of Italy
- Died: 19 September 1999 (aged 93); Rome, Italy
- Occupations: Architect, urban planner

Giulio Pediconi (31 January 1906 – 19 September 1999) was an Italian architect and urban planner active from the 1930s through the late 20th century. He is known for his long-standing professional partnership with Mario Paniconi, with whom he formed one of the most significant Roman architectural studios of the mid-20th century.

== Life and career ==
Born in Rome, Pediconi graduated in architecture in 1930. During his university studies he met Mario Paniconi, beginning a professional collaboration that would last for over four decades. The Paniconi–Pediconi studio became widely recognized for its refined architectural language, positioned between modern rationalism and a renewed classical tradition.

In the 1930s, Pediconi participated in major architectural competitions, including projects for the E42 (Esposizione Universale di Roma). He was associated with the RAMI (Raggruppamento Architetti Moderni Italiani), contributing to debates on the relationship between modern architecture and Italian tradition during the Fascist period.

After the death of Paniconi in 1973, Pediconi oversaw the completion of projects already under construction, including the Ministry of Posts at EUR and the church of the Holy Family in Rome. He subsequently withdrew from professional practice.

Pediconi died in Rome in 1999.

== Sources ==
- Capanna, Alessandra (2015). "PEDICONI, Giulio". Dizionario Biografico degli Italiani. Vol. 82. Rome: Treccani.
- Muntoni, Alessandra (1987). Lo studio Paniconi-Pediconi 1934–1984. Rome: Officina Edizioni.
