= List of churches in Rome =

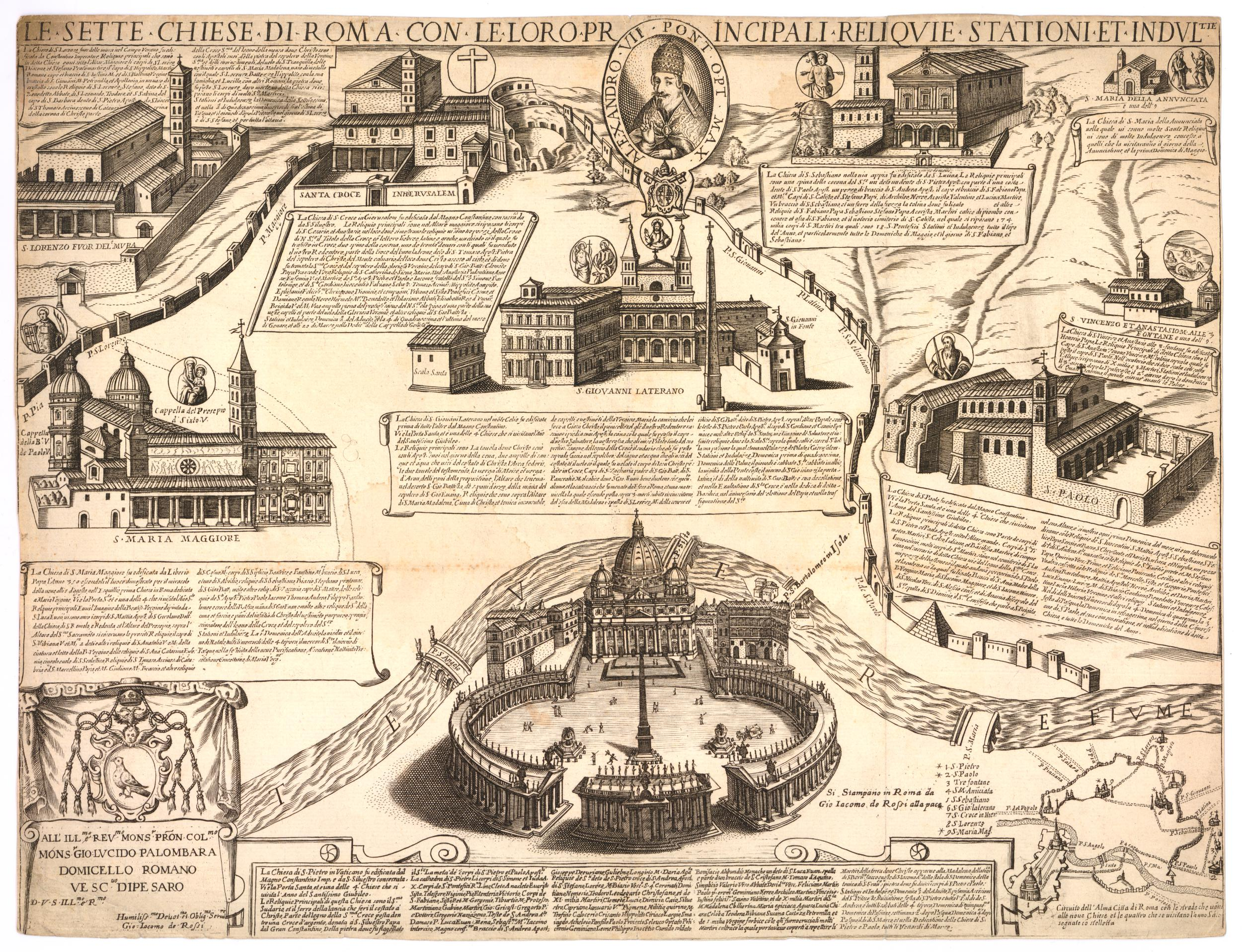
Map of the seven pilgrimage churches in Rome, published by Giovanni Giacomo de' Rossi (17th century)

Rome contains one of the largest and most historically layered concentrations of churches in the world. The city's ecclesiastical landscape developed continuously from late antiquity through the Middle Ages and into the modern period, with many churches founded on earlier tituli, rebuilt across multiple centuries, and adapted to changing liturgical and urban conditions. As a result, individual churches often resist simple chronological classification, since early foundations frequently survive primarily in later medieval, Renaissance, or Baroque form.

== Tituli ==
Pope Marcellus I (A.D. 306–308) is said to have recognized twenty five tituli in the City of Rome, quasi dioecesis. It is known that in 336, Pope Julius I had set the number of presbyter cardinals to 28, so that for each day of the week, a different presbyter cardinal would say mass in one of the four major basilicas of Rome, St. Peter's, Basilica of Saint Paul Outside the Walls, Basilica di Santa Maria Maggiore, and Basilica of St. John Lateran. In Stephan Kuttner's view, "...the Roman cardinal priests and bishops were 'incardinated' for permanent (though limited) purposes into the patriarchal basilicas while remaining bound nonetheless to the churches of their original ordination."

Only the tituli were allowed to distribute sacraments. The most important priest in a titulus was given the name of Cardinal. Pope Marcellus I (at the beginning of the 4th century) confirmed that the tituli were the only centres of administration in the Church. In AD 499, a synod held by Pope Symmachus listed all the presbyters participating, as well as the tituli who were present at that time:

1. Titulus Aemilianae (Santi Quattro Coronati)
2. Titulus Anastasiae (Santa Anastasia)
3. Titulus SS Apostolorum (Santi Apostoli)
4. Titulus Byzantis or Vizantis (unknown, perhaps "Titulus Pammachii")
5. Titulus S Caeciliae (Santa Cecilia in Trastevere)
6. Titulus Clementis (San Clemente)
7. Titulus Crescentianae (San Sisto Vecchio)
8. Titulus Crysogoni (San Crisogono)
9. Titulus Cyriaci (Uncertain; theories include Santa Maria Antiqua and Santa Maria in Domnica)
10. Titulus Damasi (San Lorenzo in Damaso)
11. Titulus Equitii (San Martino ai Monti)
12. Titulus Eusebi (Sant'Eusebio)
13. Titulus Fasciolae (Santi Nereo e Achilleo)
14. Titulus Gaii (Santa Susanna)
15. Titulus Iulii (Santa Maria in Trastevere, identical with Titulus Callixti)
16. Titulus Lucinae (San Lorenzo in Lucina)
17. Titulus Marcelli (San Marcello al Corso)
18. Titulus Marci (San Marco)
19. Titulus Matthaei (in Via Merulana, destroyed in 1810)
20. Titulus Nicomedis (in Via Nomentana, destroyed)
21. Titulus Pammachii (Santi Giovanni e Paolo (Rome))
22. Titulus Praxedis (Santa Prassede)
23. Titulus Priscae (Santa Prisca)
24. Titulus Pudentis (Santa Pudenziana)
25. Titulus Romani (unknown, perhaps either Santa Maria Antiqua or Santa Maria in Domnica; whichever, the "Titulus Cyriaci" was not)
26. Titulus S Sabinae (Santa Sabina)
27. Titulus Tigridae (uncertain, perhaps Santa Balbina)
28. Titulus Vestinae (San Vitale)

== "Seven Pilgrim Churches of Rome" ==
In the time of Pope Alexander II (1061-1073) those priests who served at St. Peter's Basilica were referred to as the seven cardinals of S. Peter's: septem cardinalibus S. Petri. The four basilicas had no cardinal, since they were under the direct supervision of the Pope. The Basilica of St. John Lateran was also the seat of the bishop of Rome. Traditionally, pilgrims were expected to visit all four basilicas, and San Lorenzo fuori le mura, Santa Croce in Gerusalemme, and San Sebastiano fuori le mura which constituted the Seven Pilgrim Churches of Rome. In the Great Jubilee in 2000, the seventh church was instead Santuario della Madonna del Divino Amore as appointed by Pope John Paul II.

== Churches by rione ==
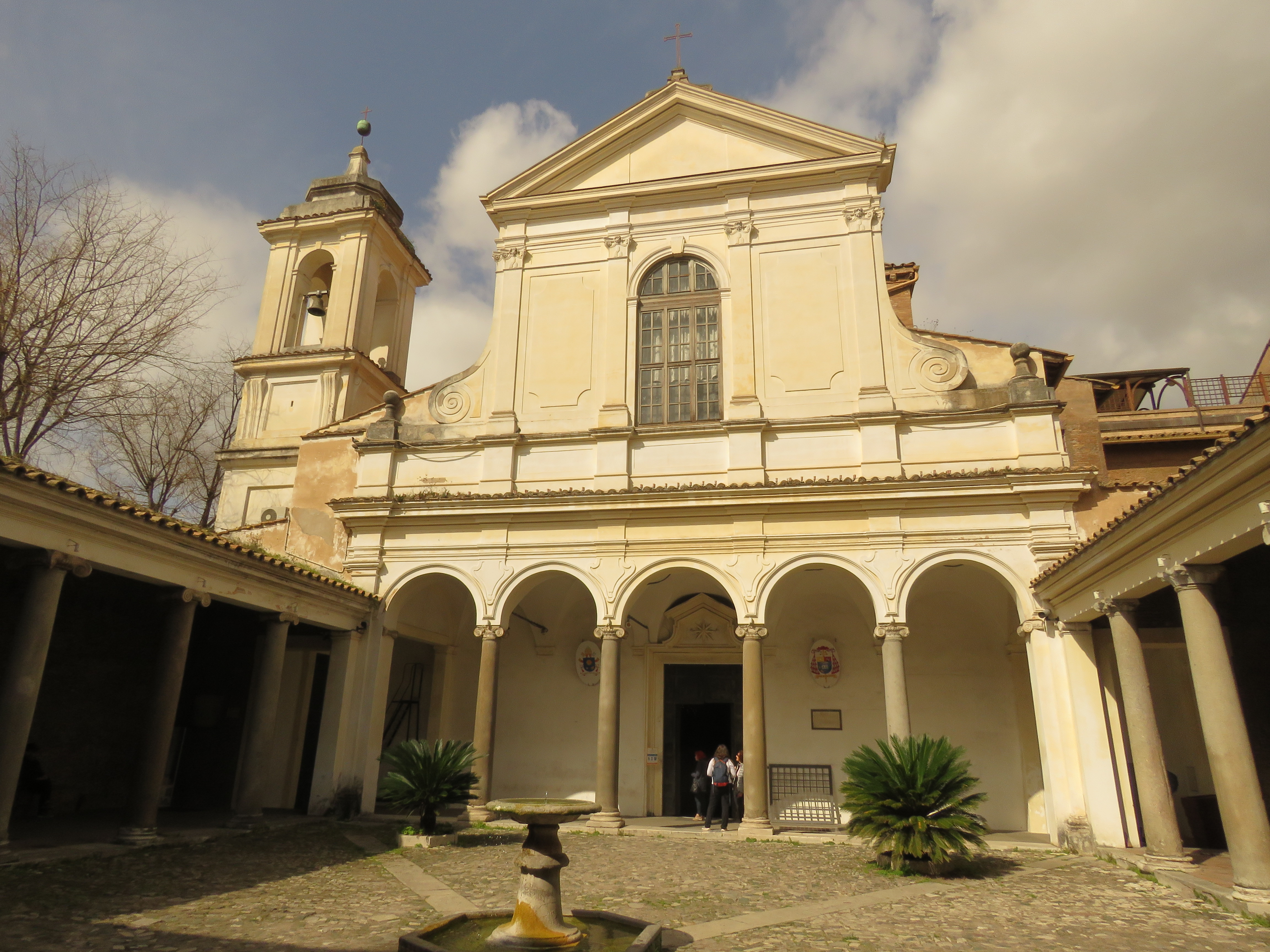
Basilica of San Clemente

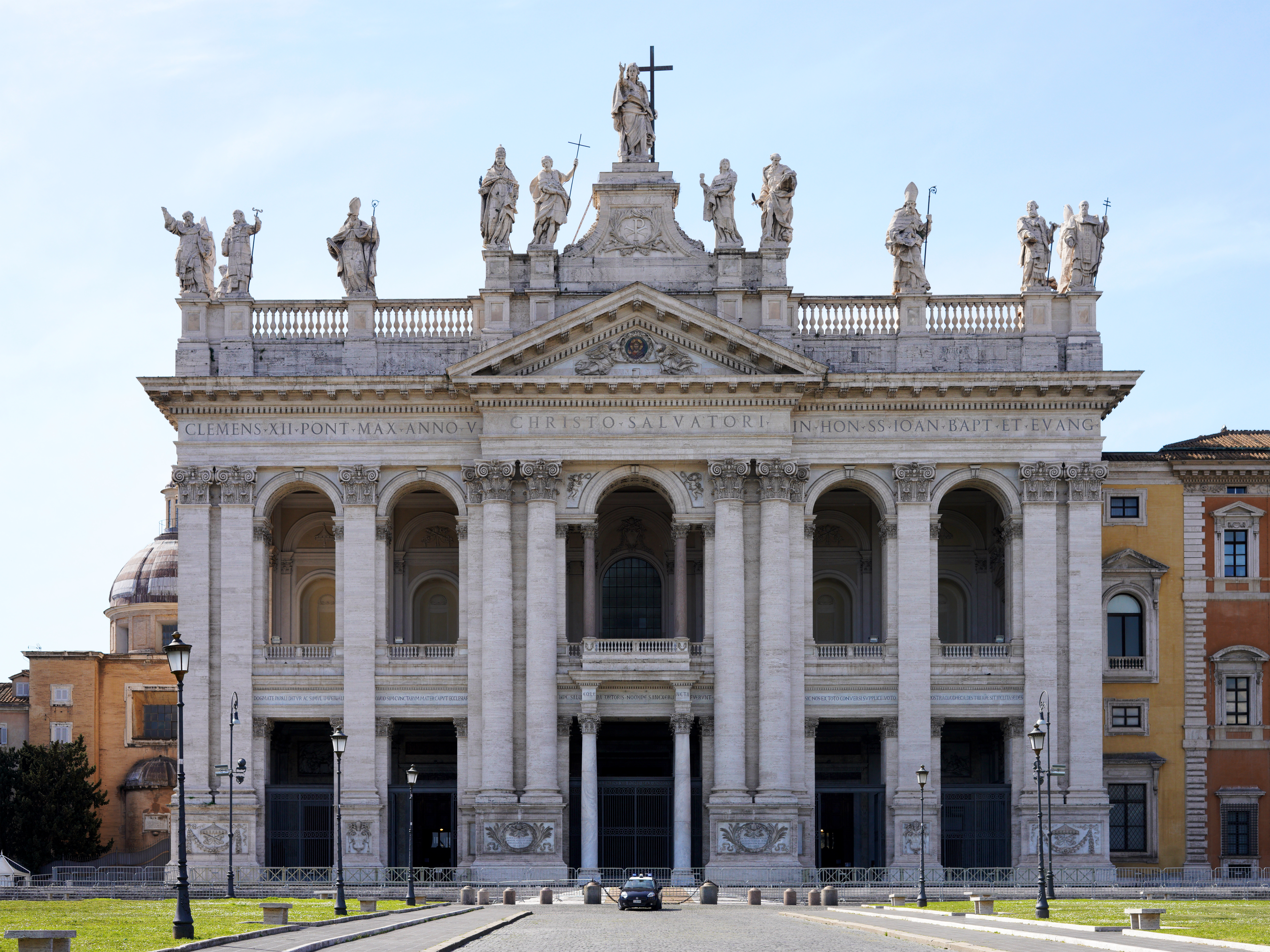
San Giovanni Laterano

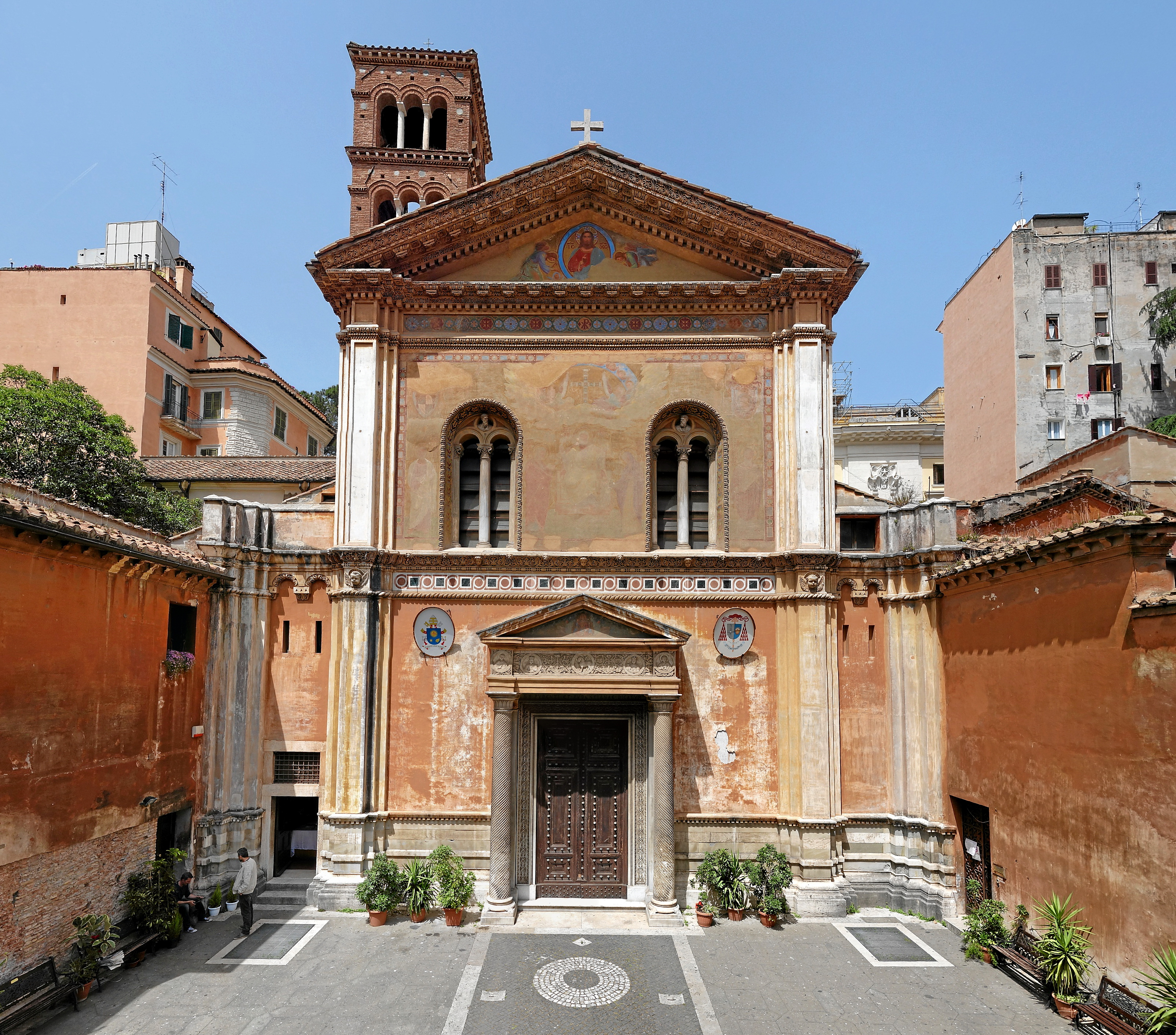
Santa Pudenziana

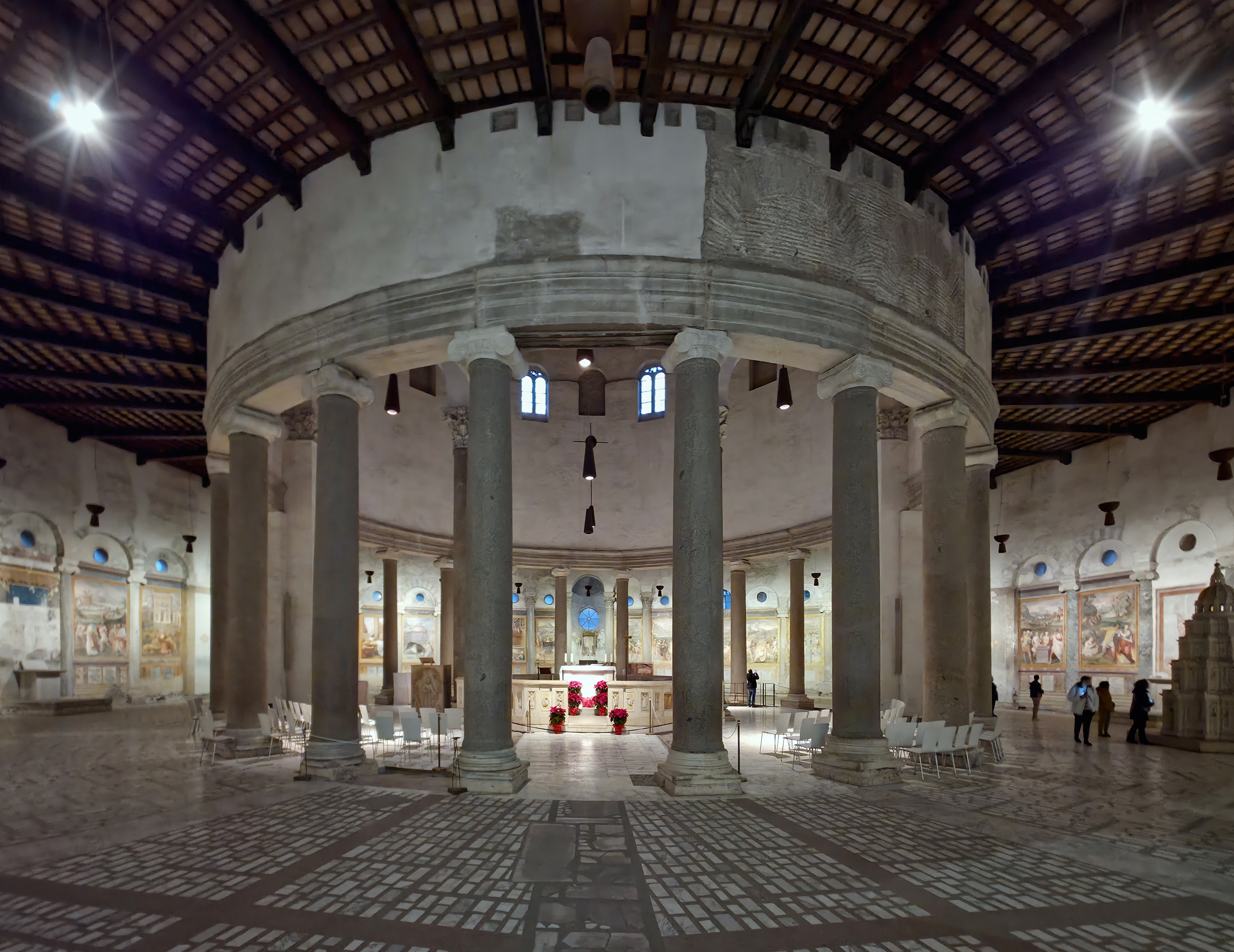
Interior of Santo Stefano al Monte Celio

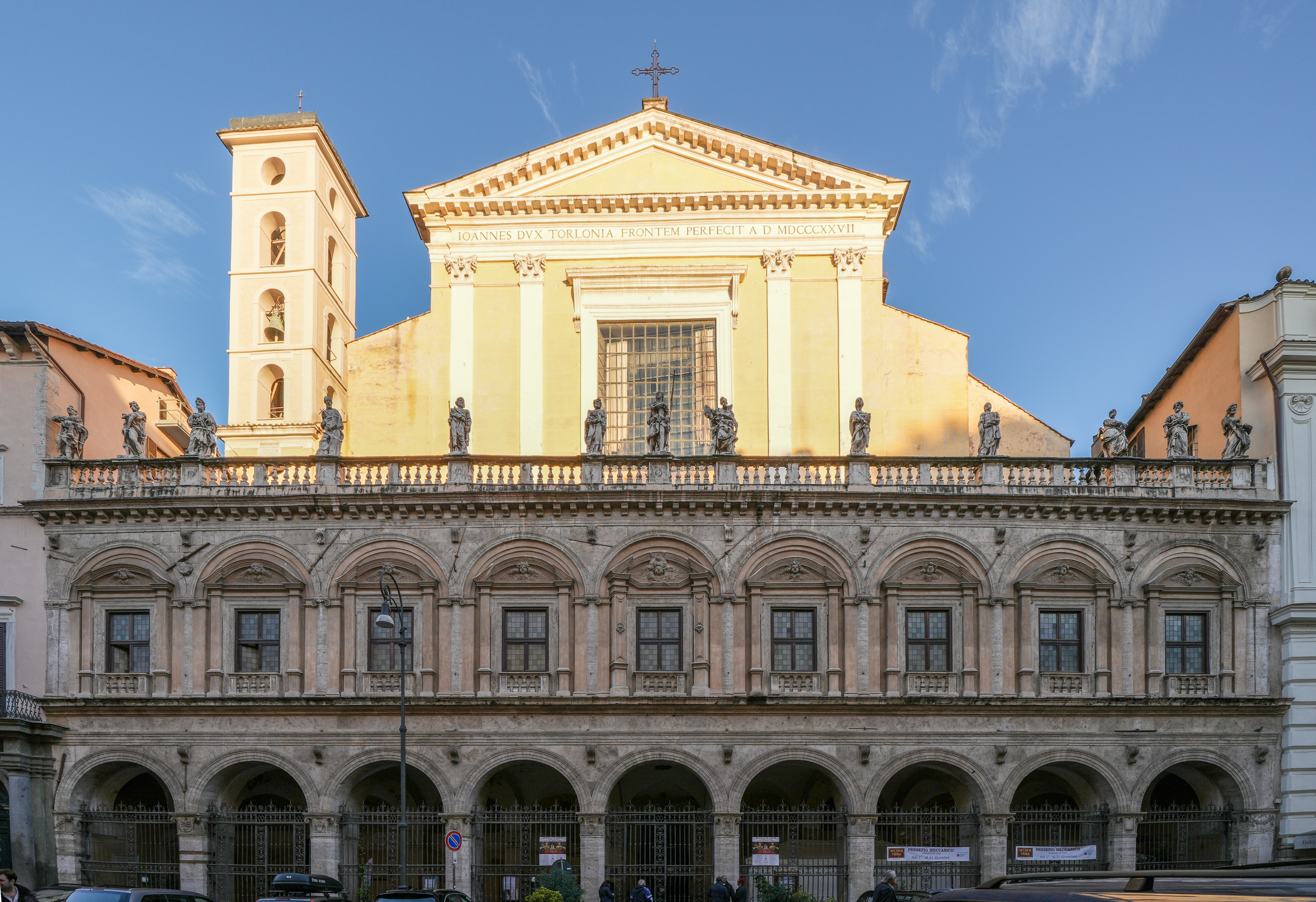
Santi Apostoli, Rome

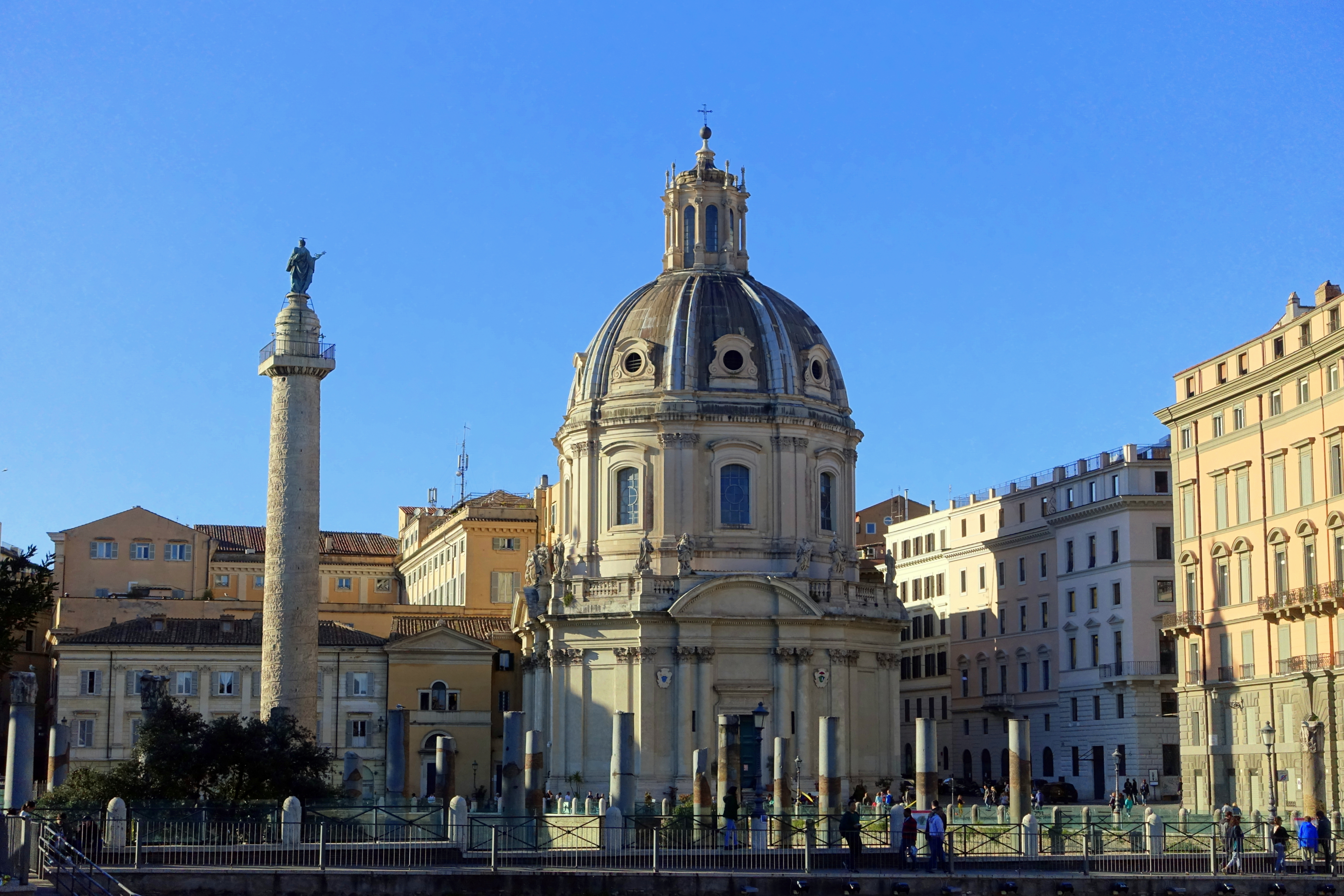
Santissimo Nome di Maria al Foro Traiano

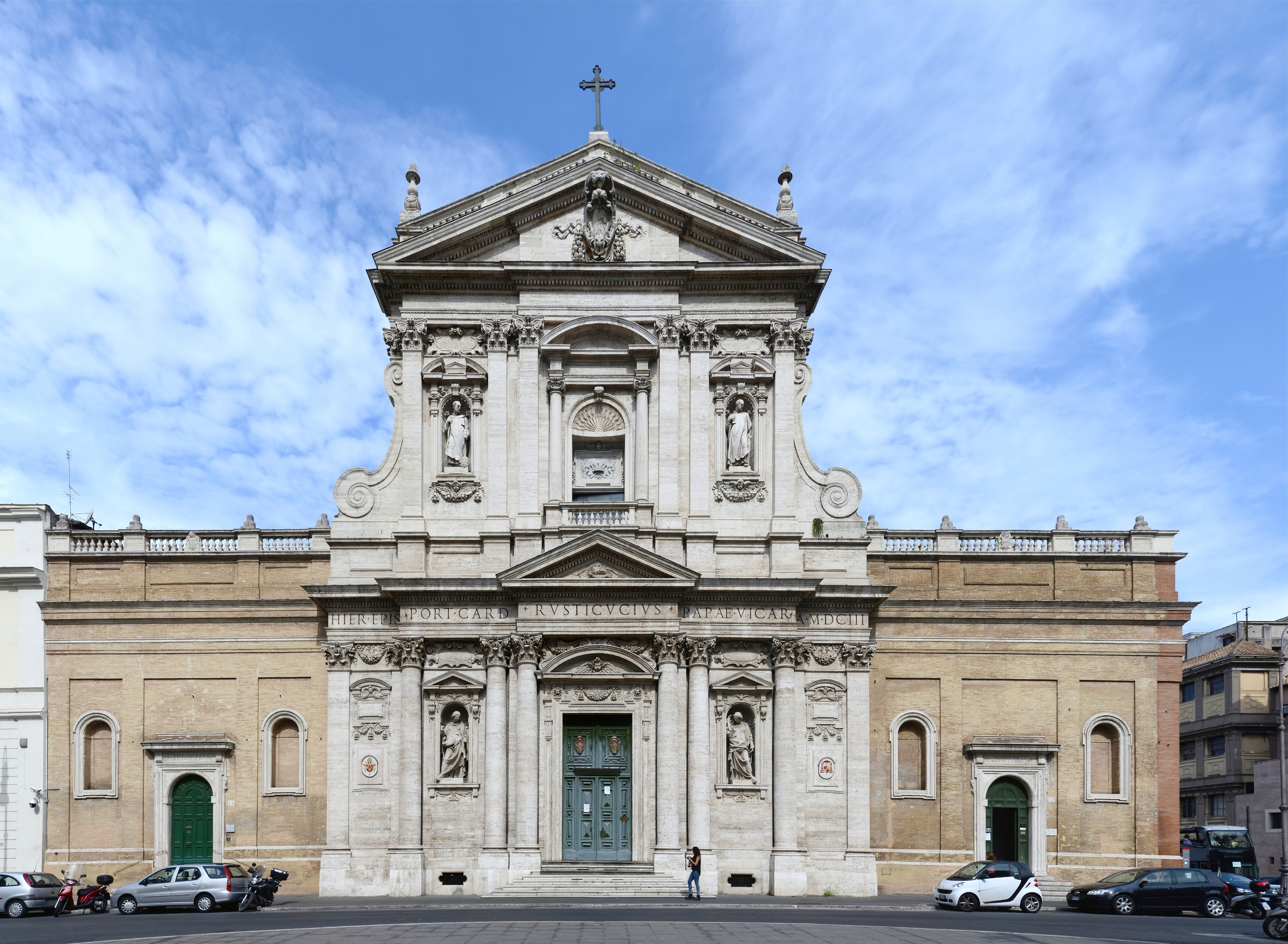
Santa Susanna

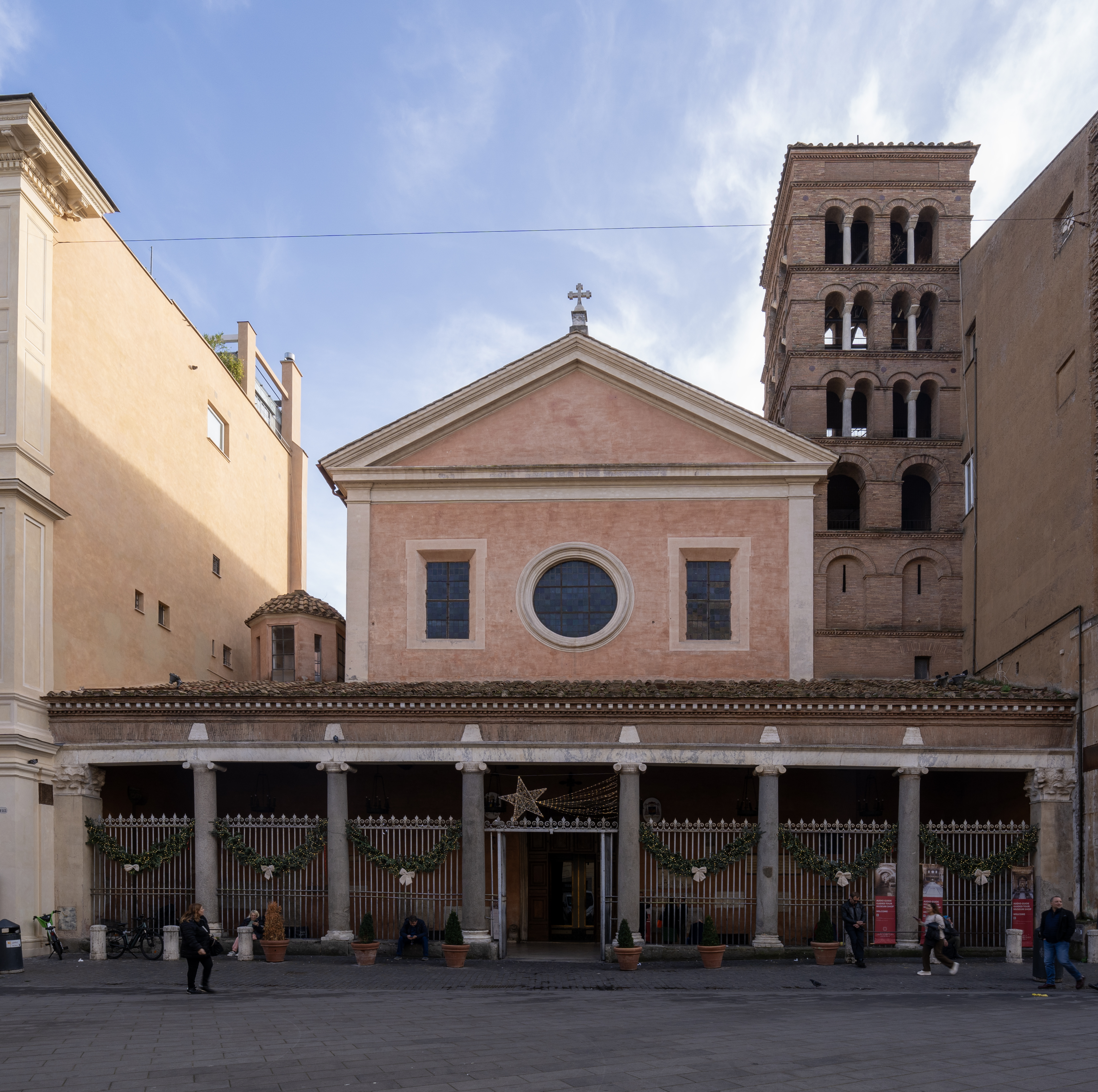
San Lorenzo in Lucina

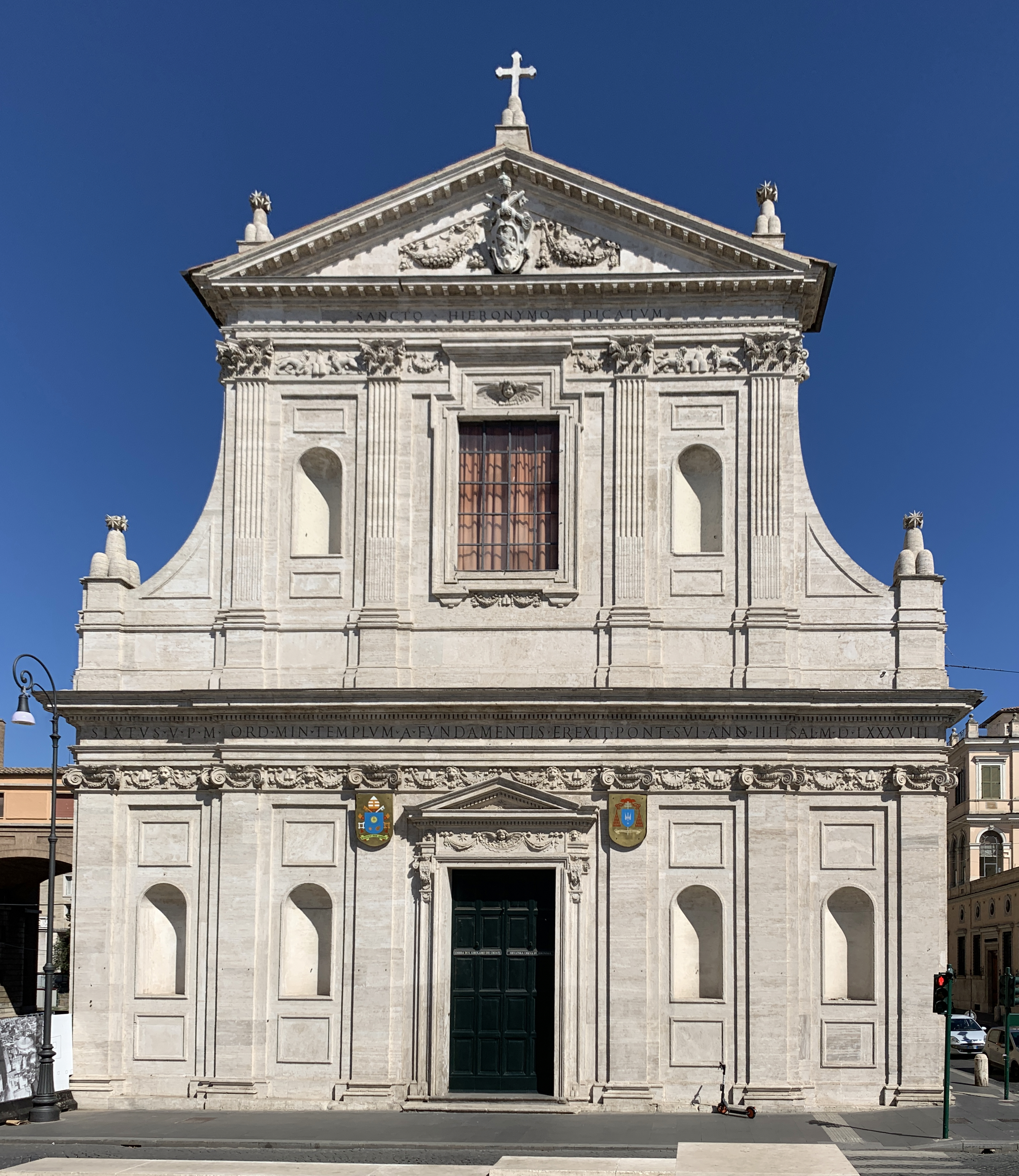
San Girolamo dei Croati

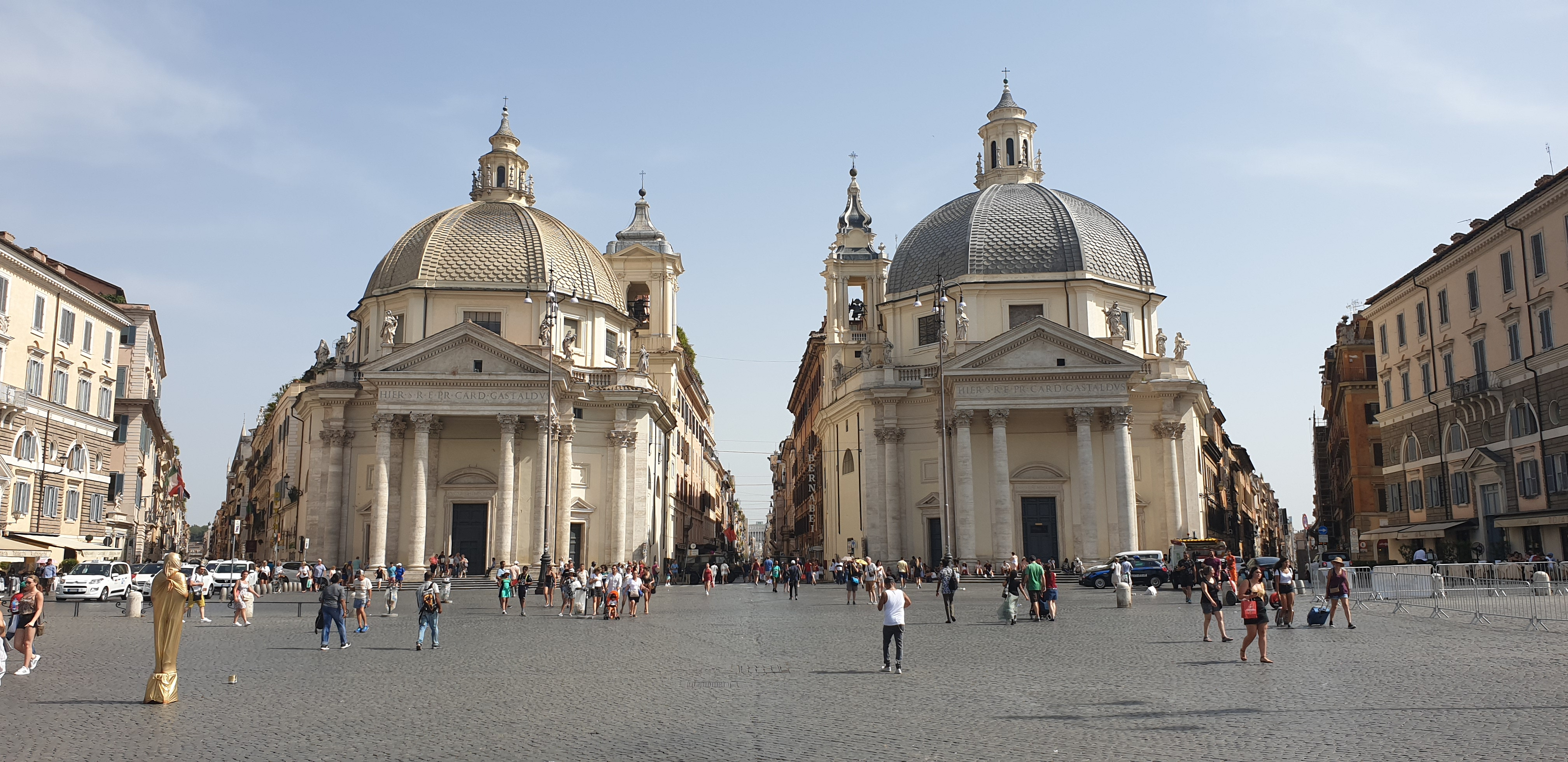
Santa Maria dei Miracoli and Santa Maria in Montesanto

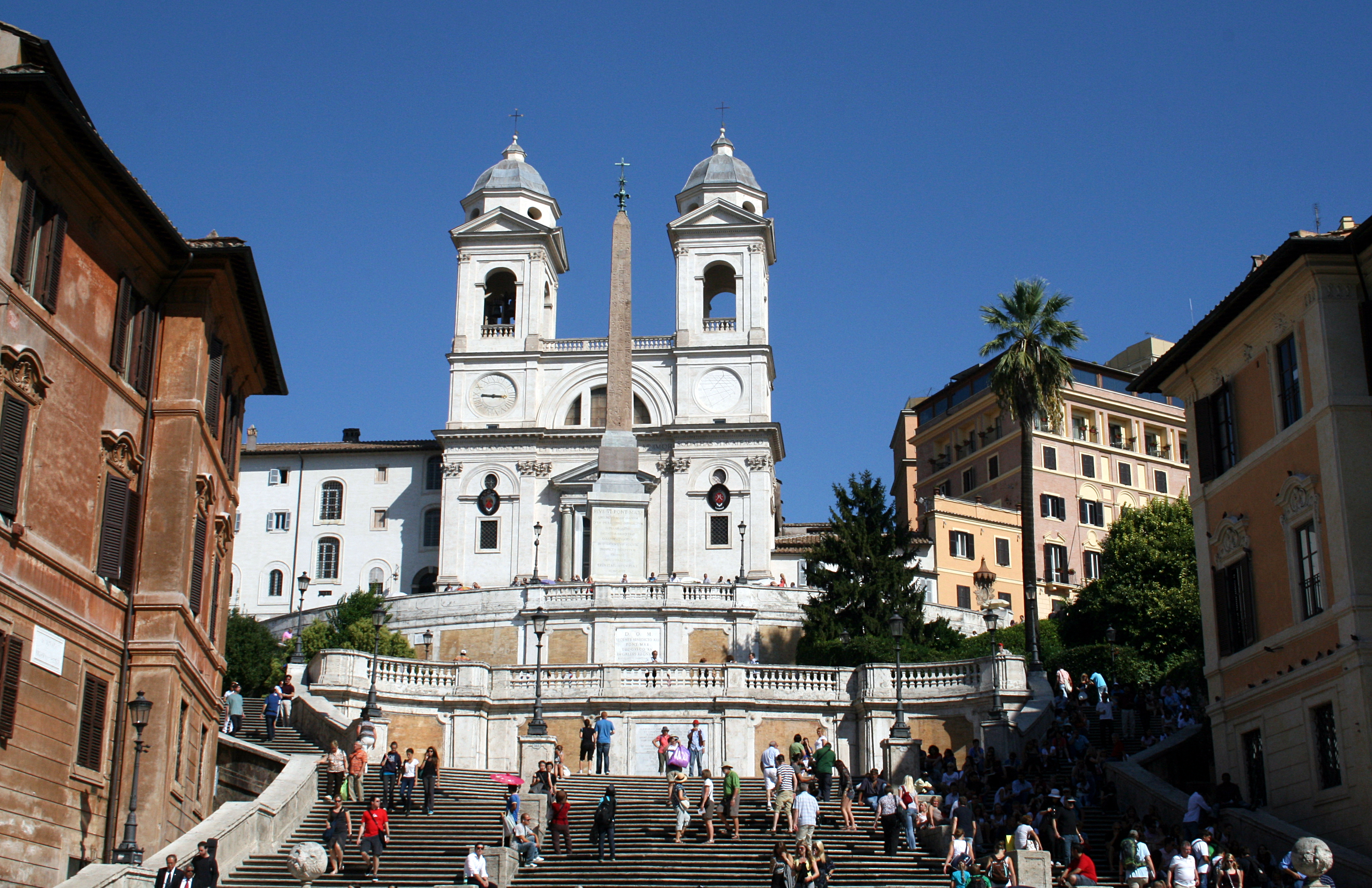
Trinità dei Monti

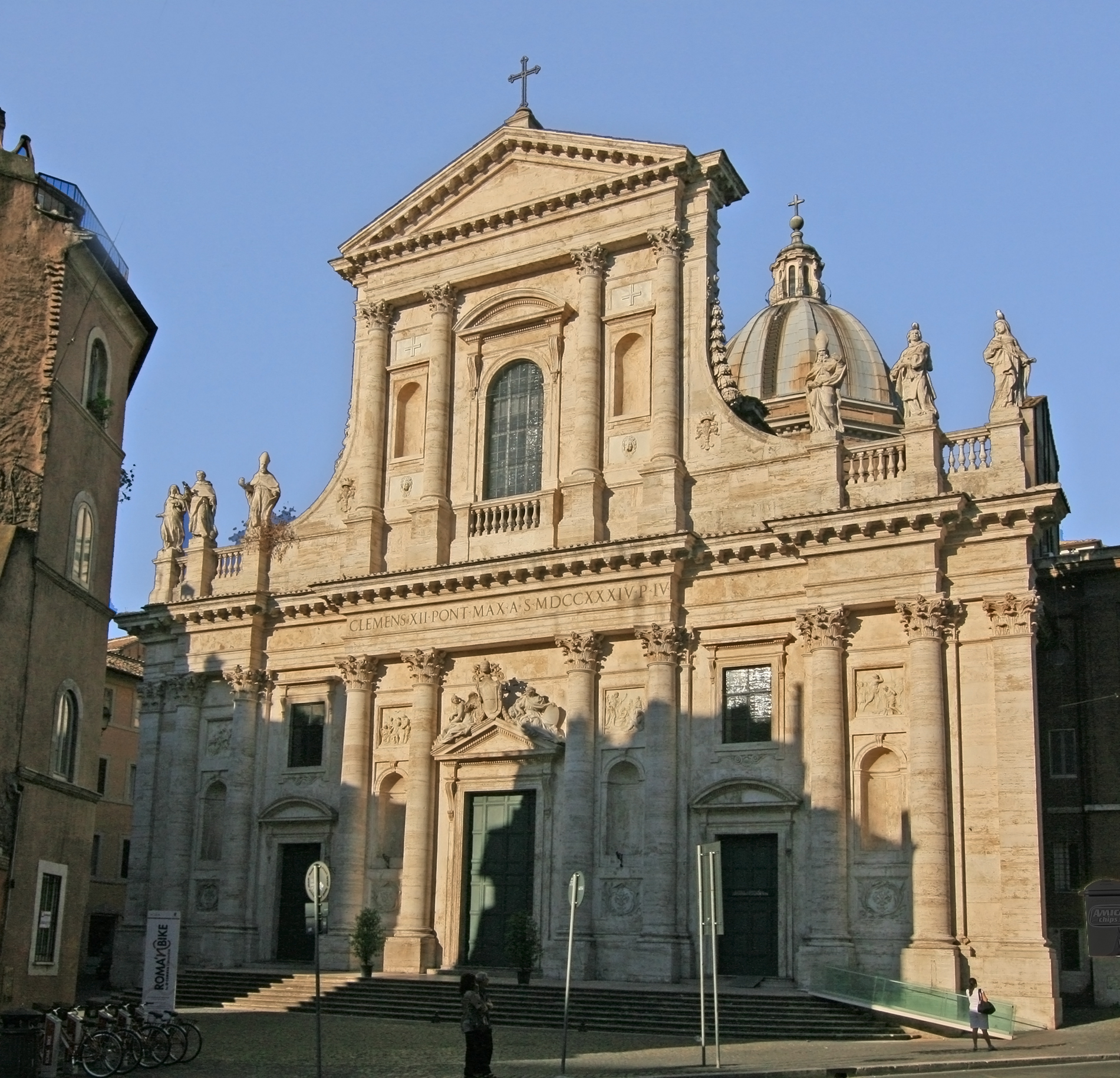
San Giovanni dei Fiorentini

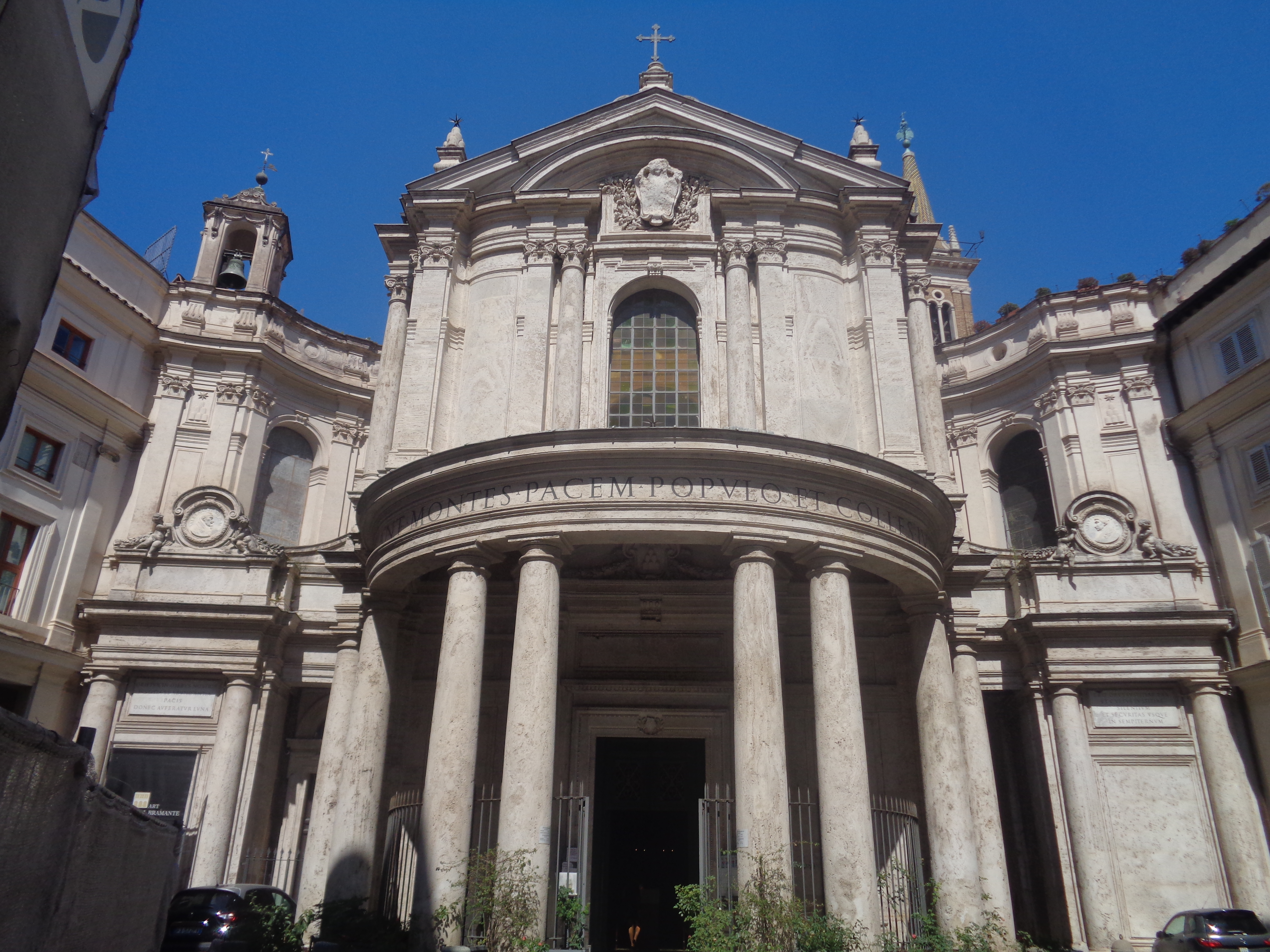
Santa Maria della Pace

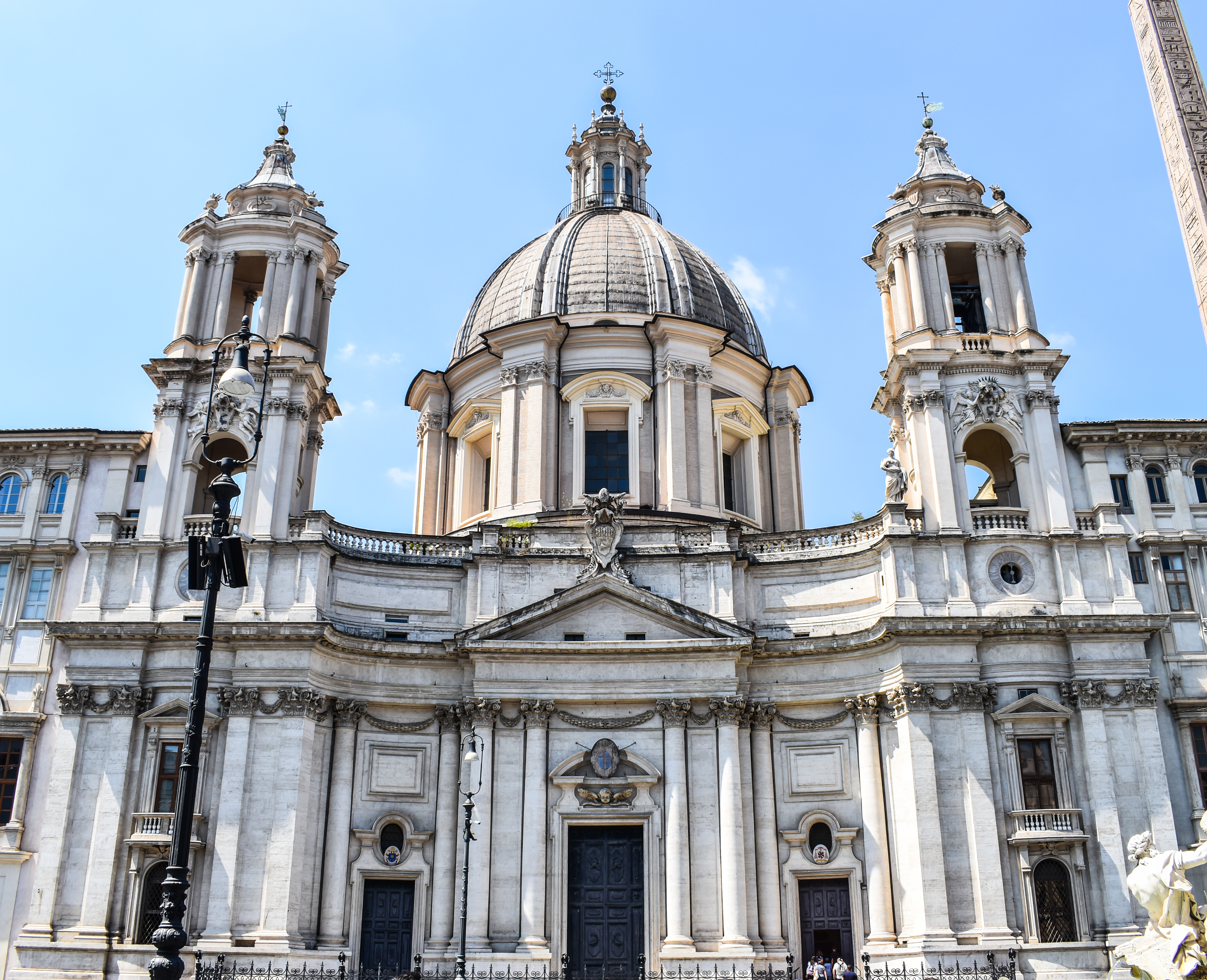
Sant'Agnese in Agone

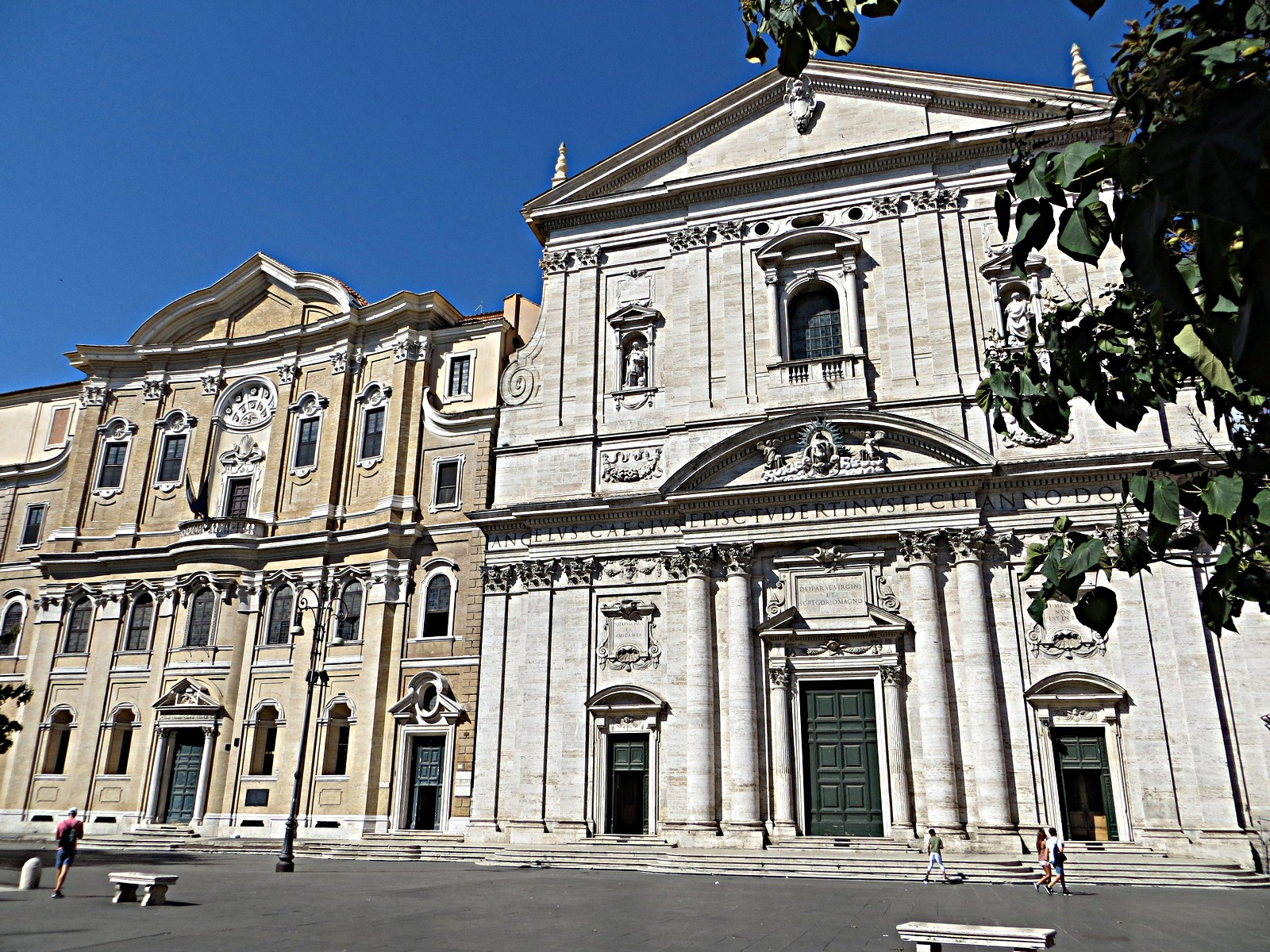
Oratorio dei Filippini and Santa Maria in Vallicella

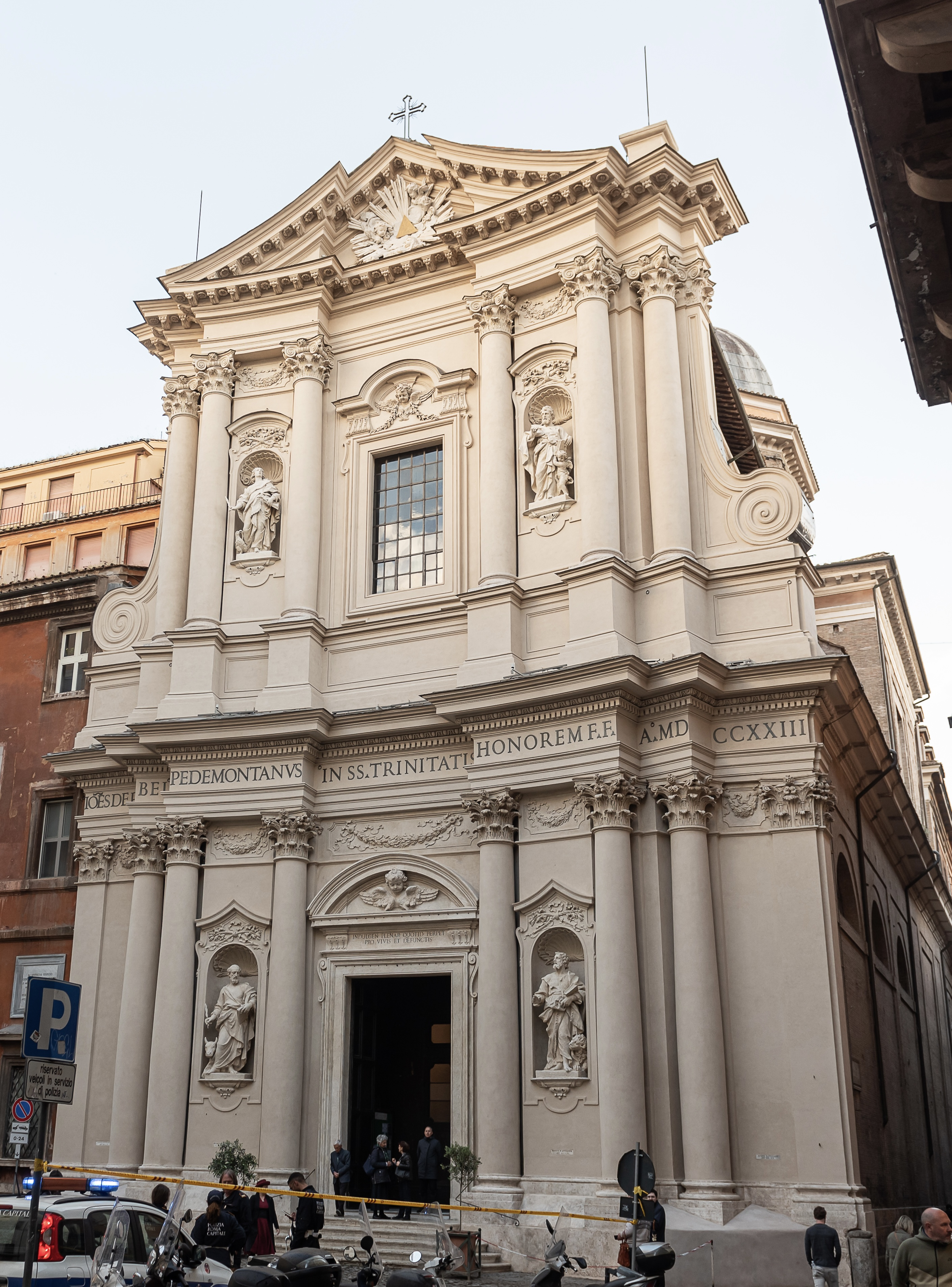
Santissima Trinità dei Pellegrini

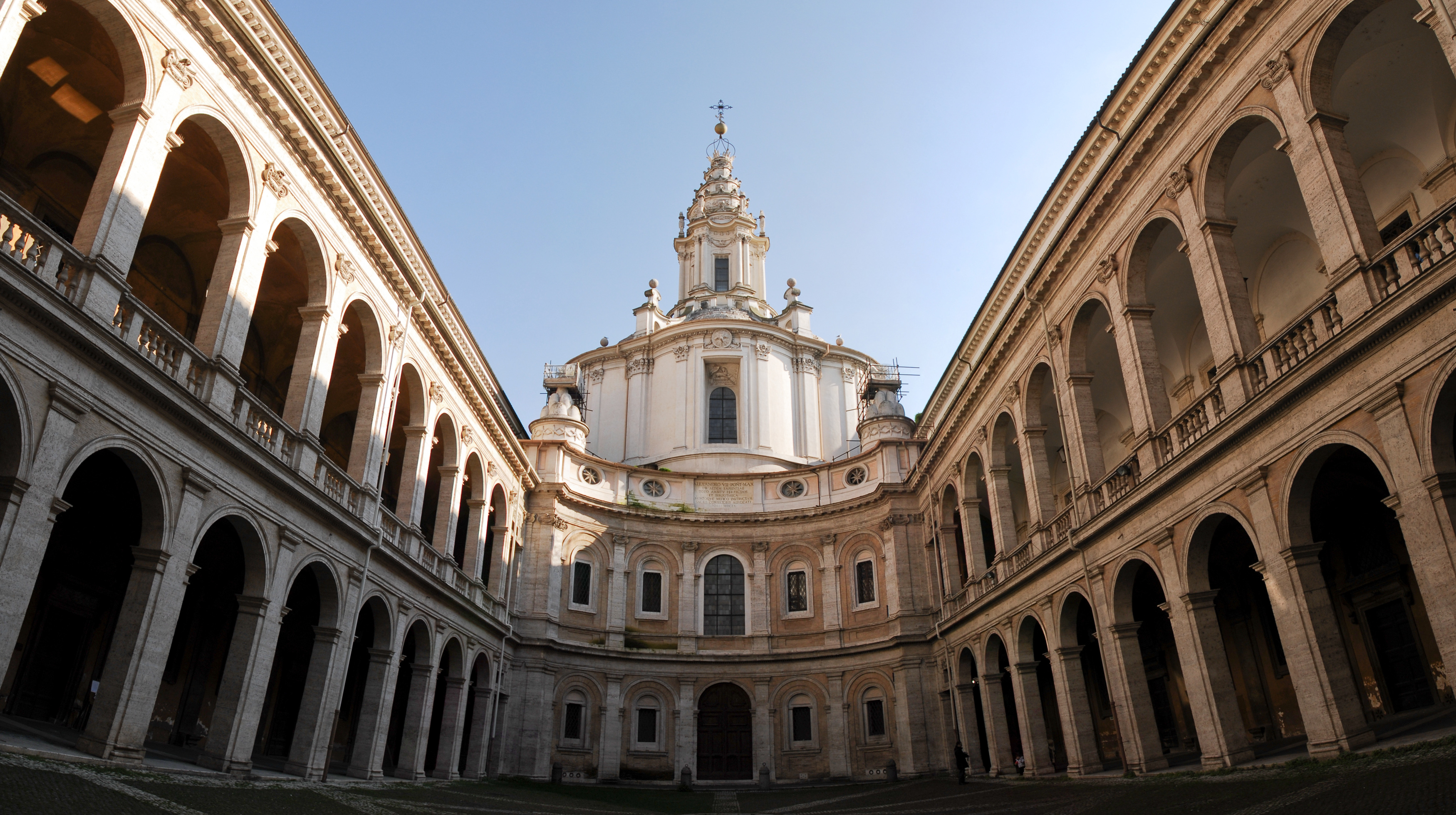
Sant'Ivo alla Sapienza

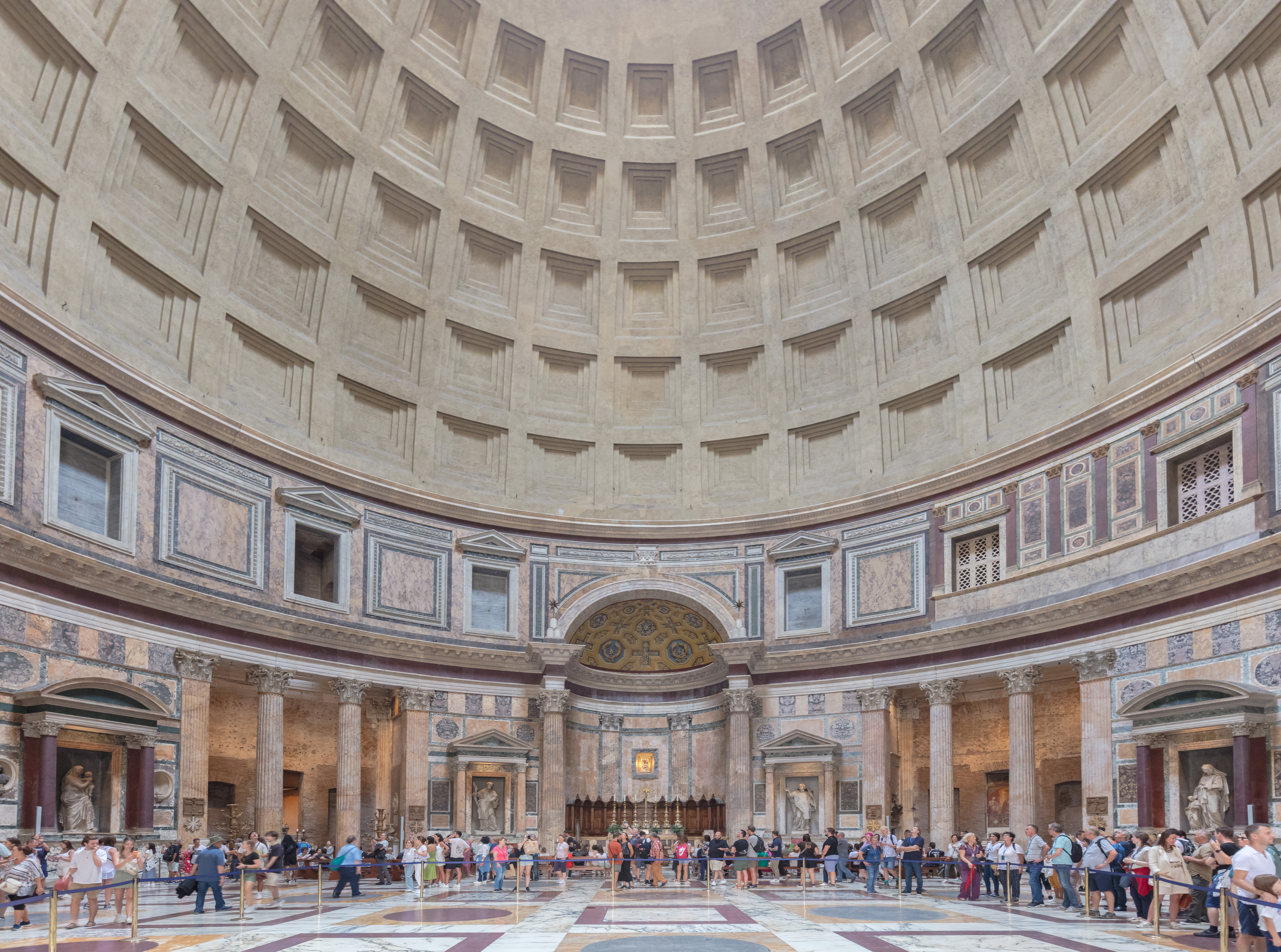
Interior of Santa Maria ad Martyres (Pantheon)

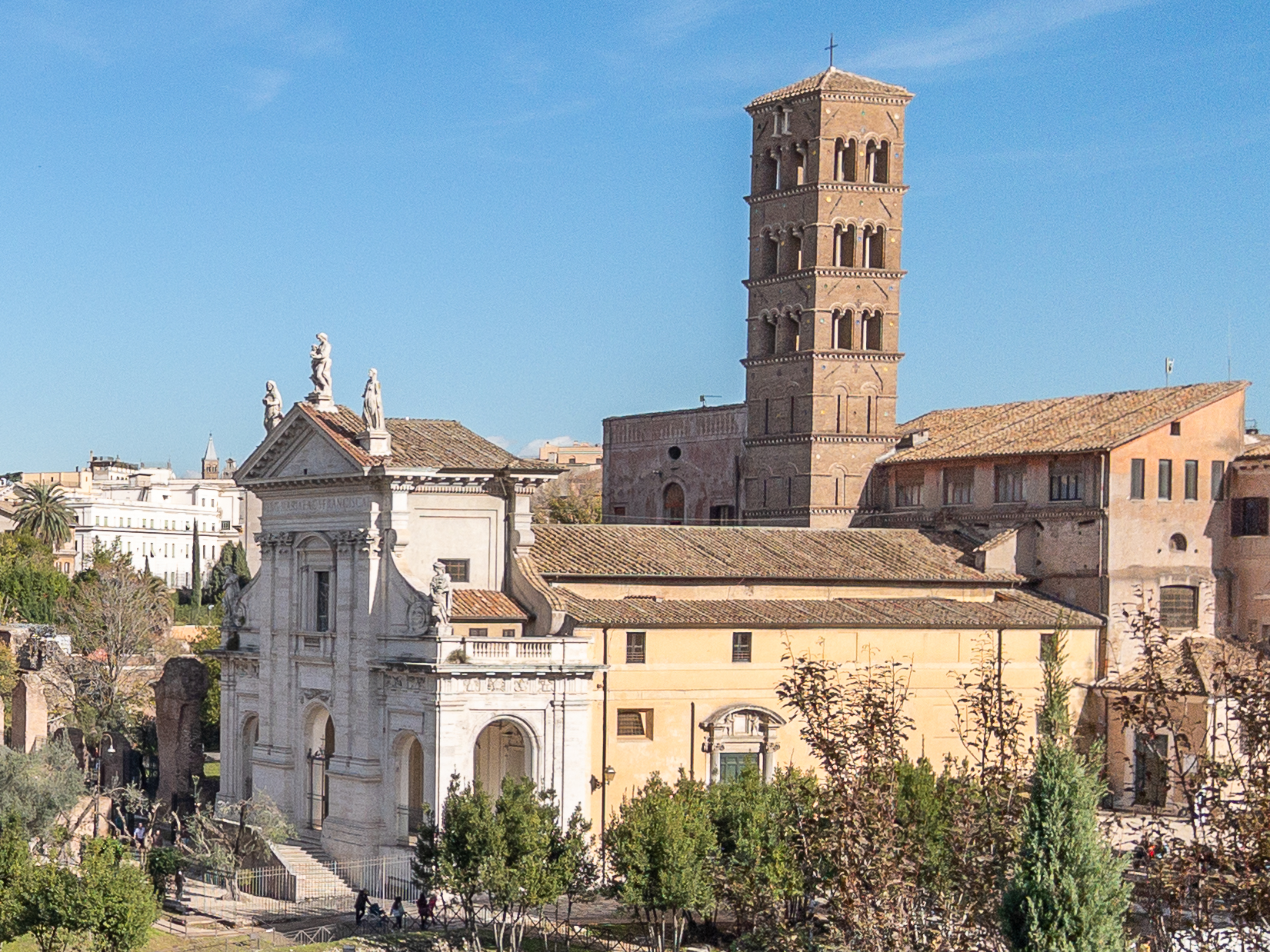
Santa Francesca Romana

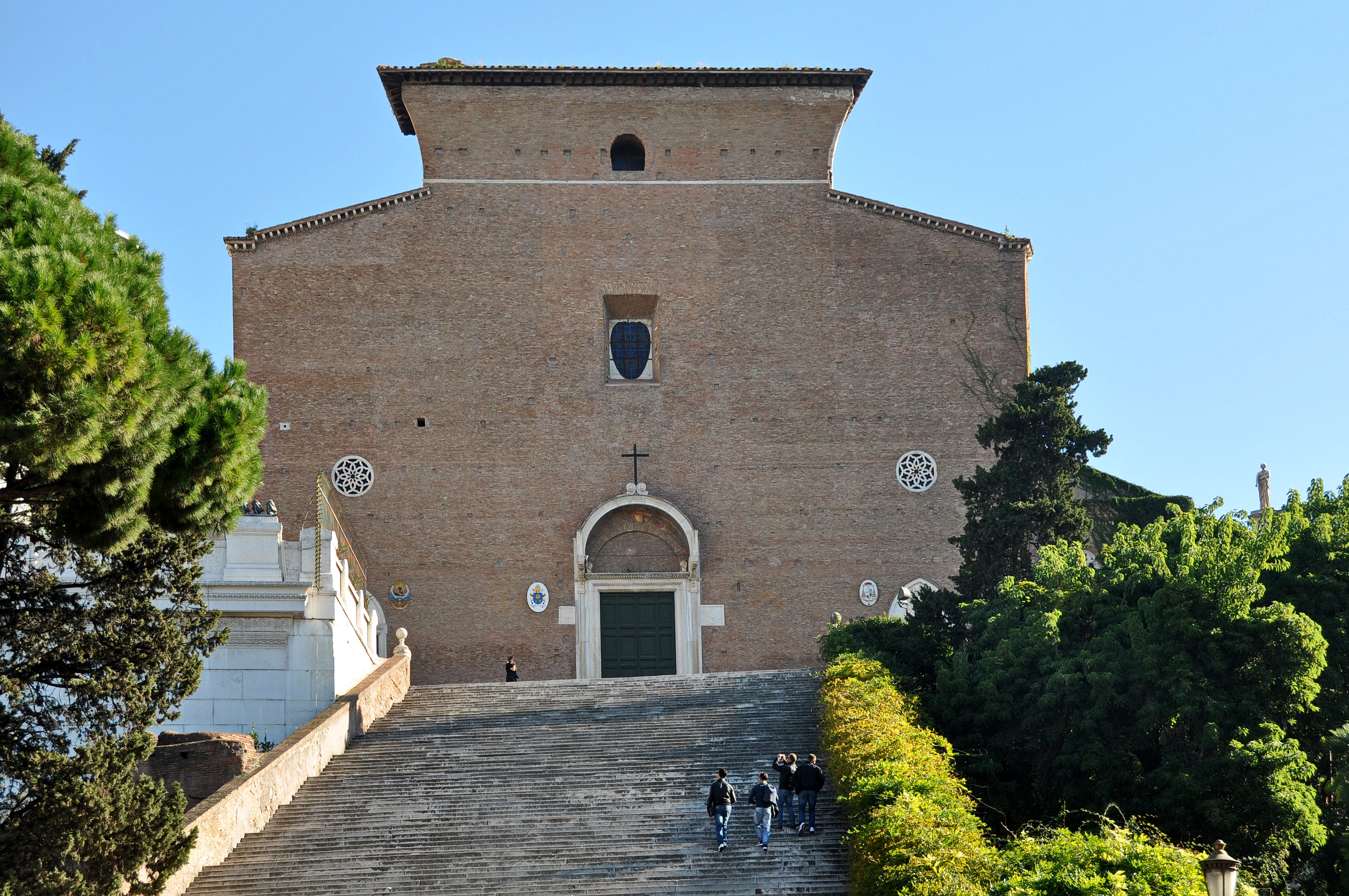
Santa Maria in Ara Coeli

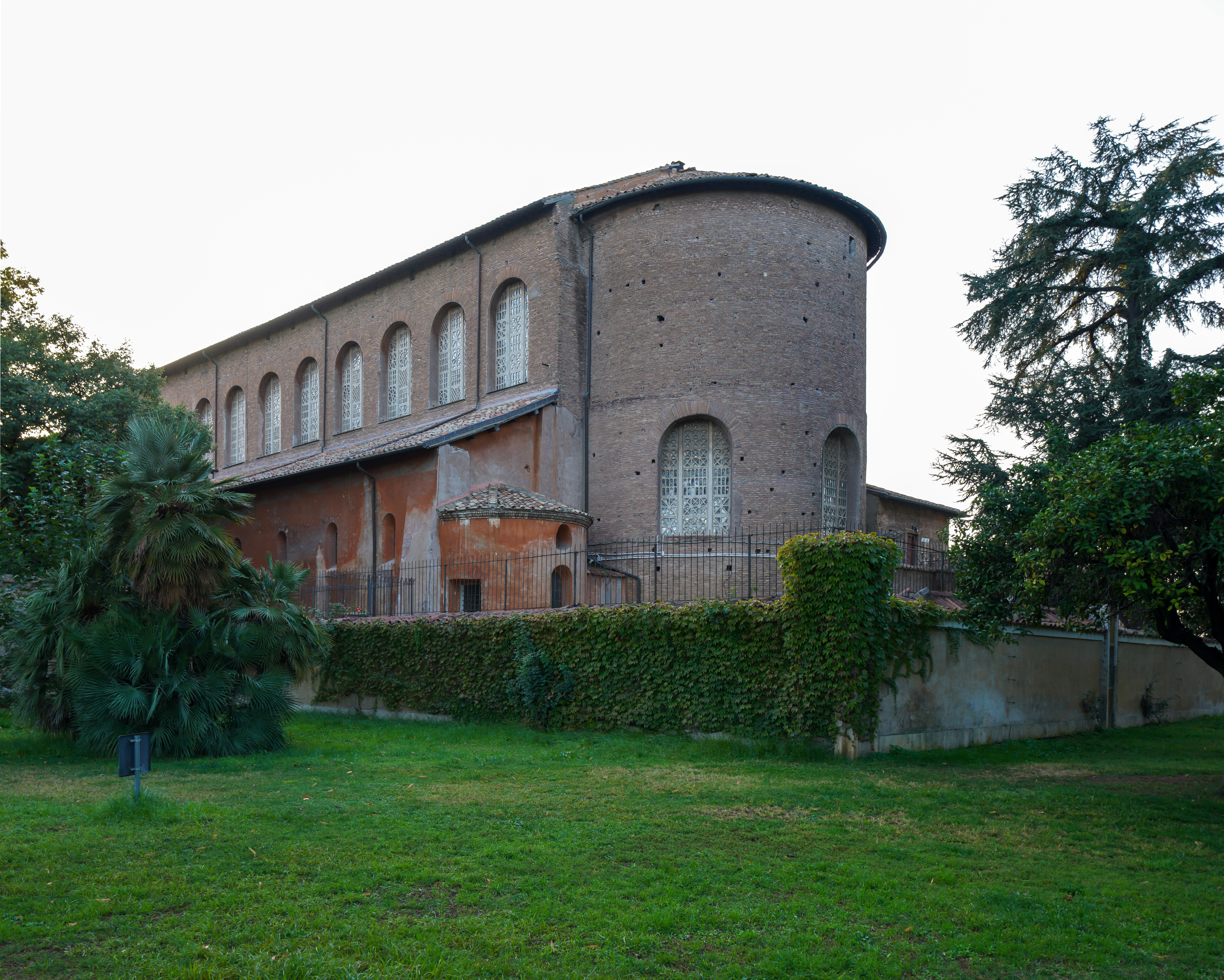
Santa Sabina

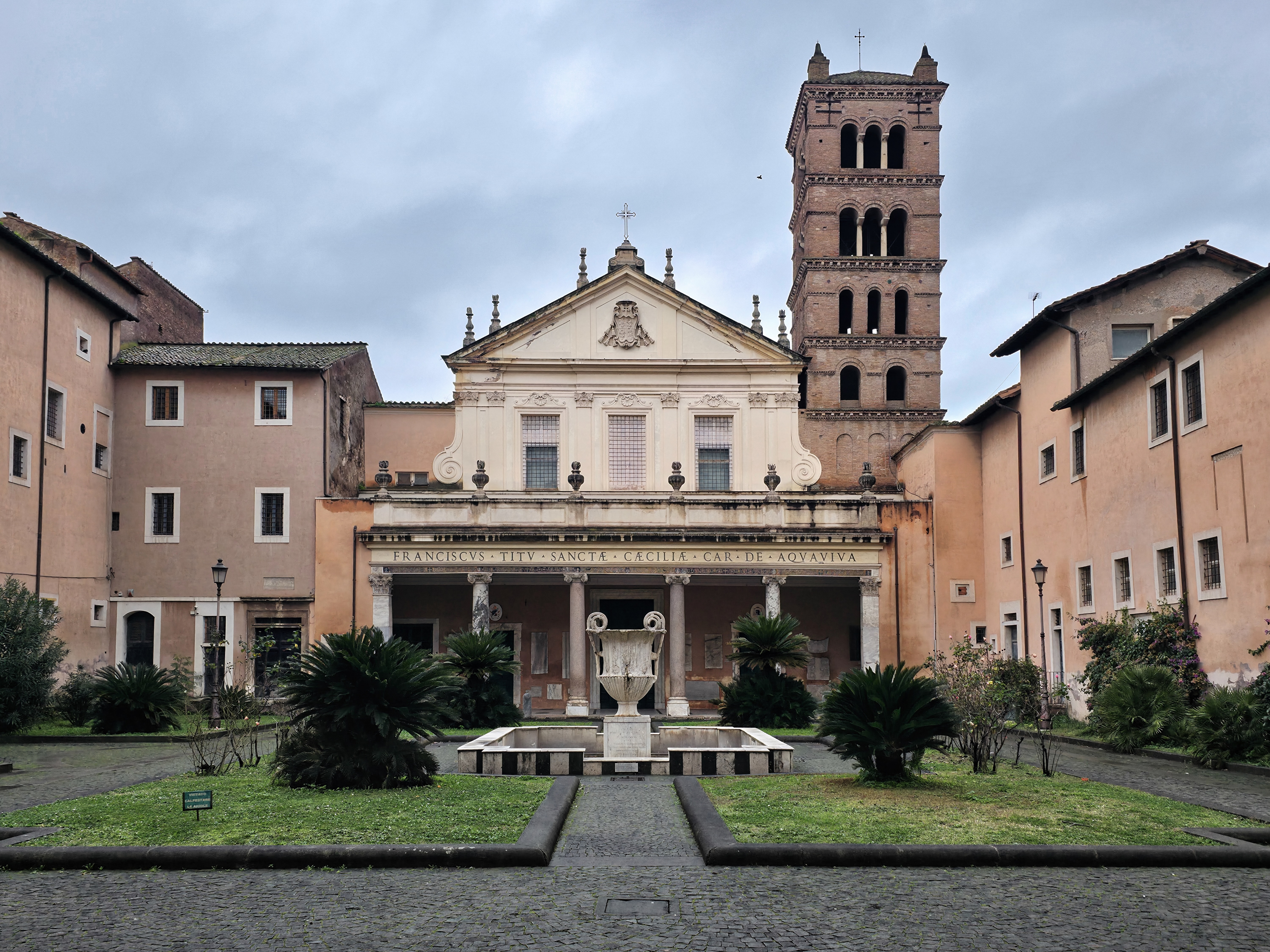
Santa Cecilia in Trastevere

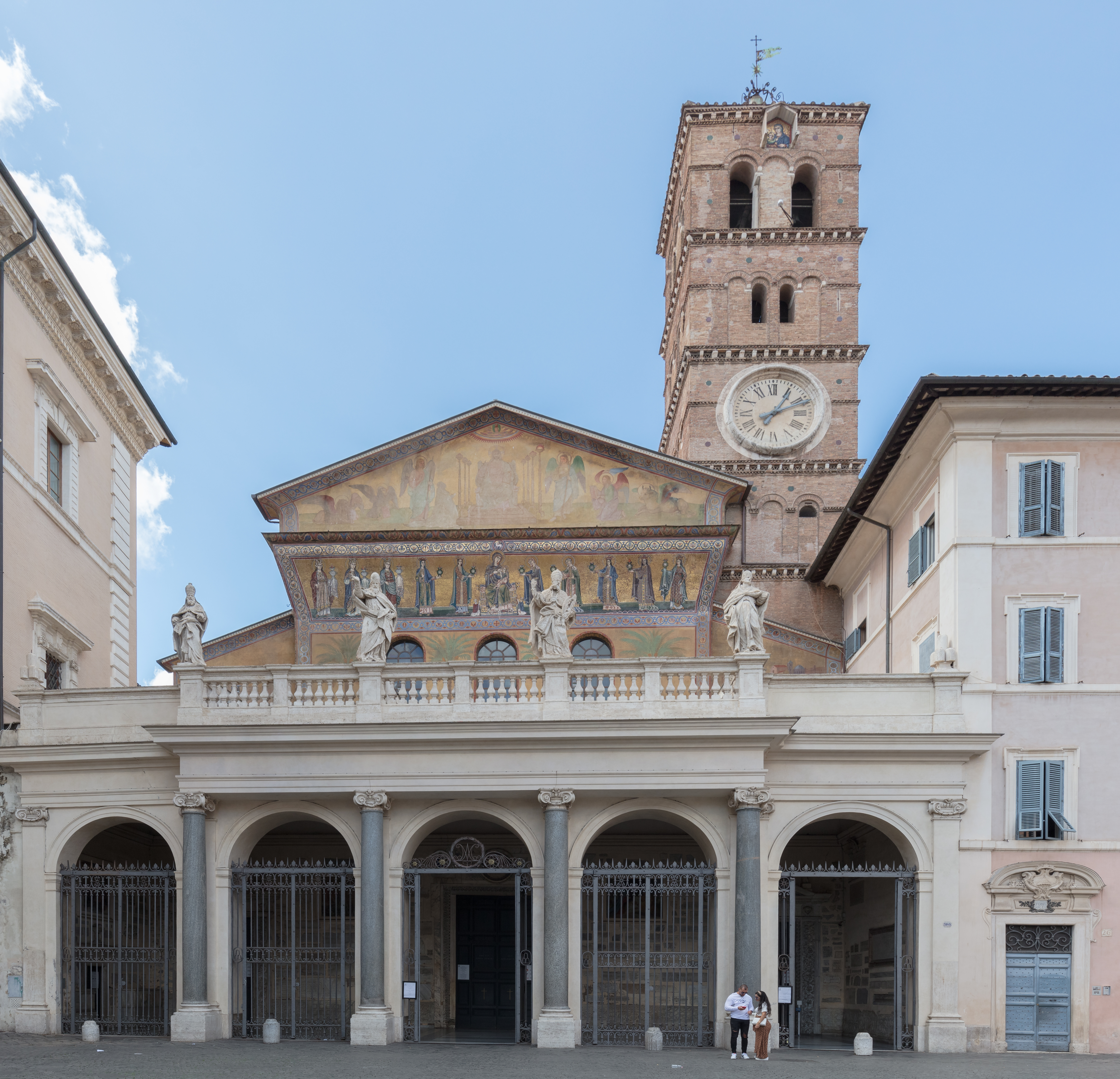
Santa Maira in Trastevere

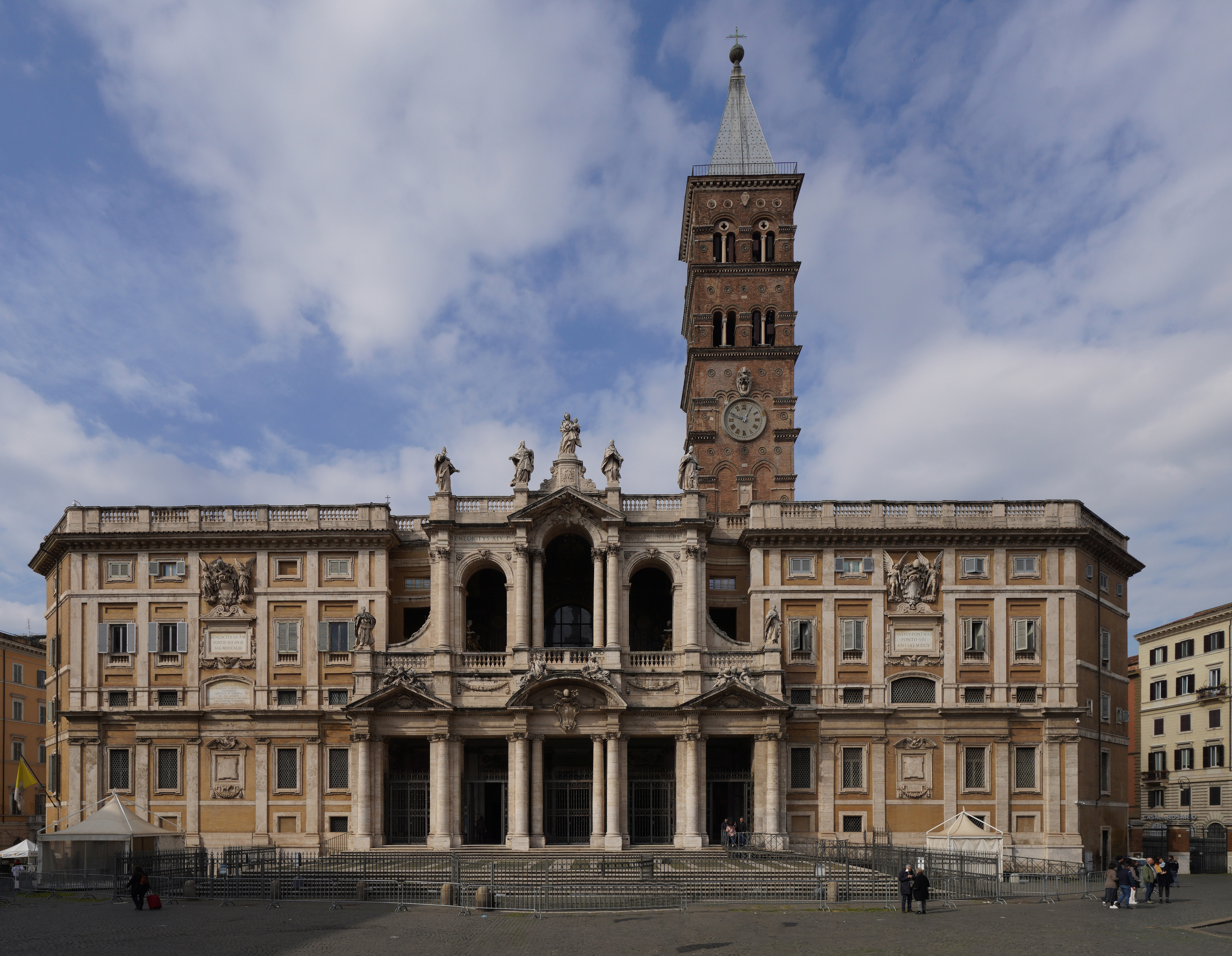
Santa Maria Maggiore

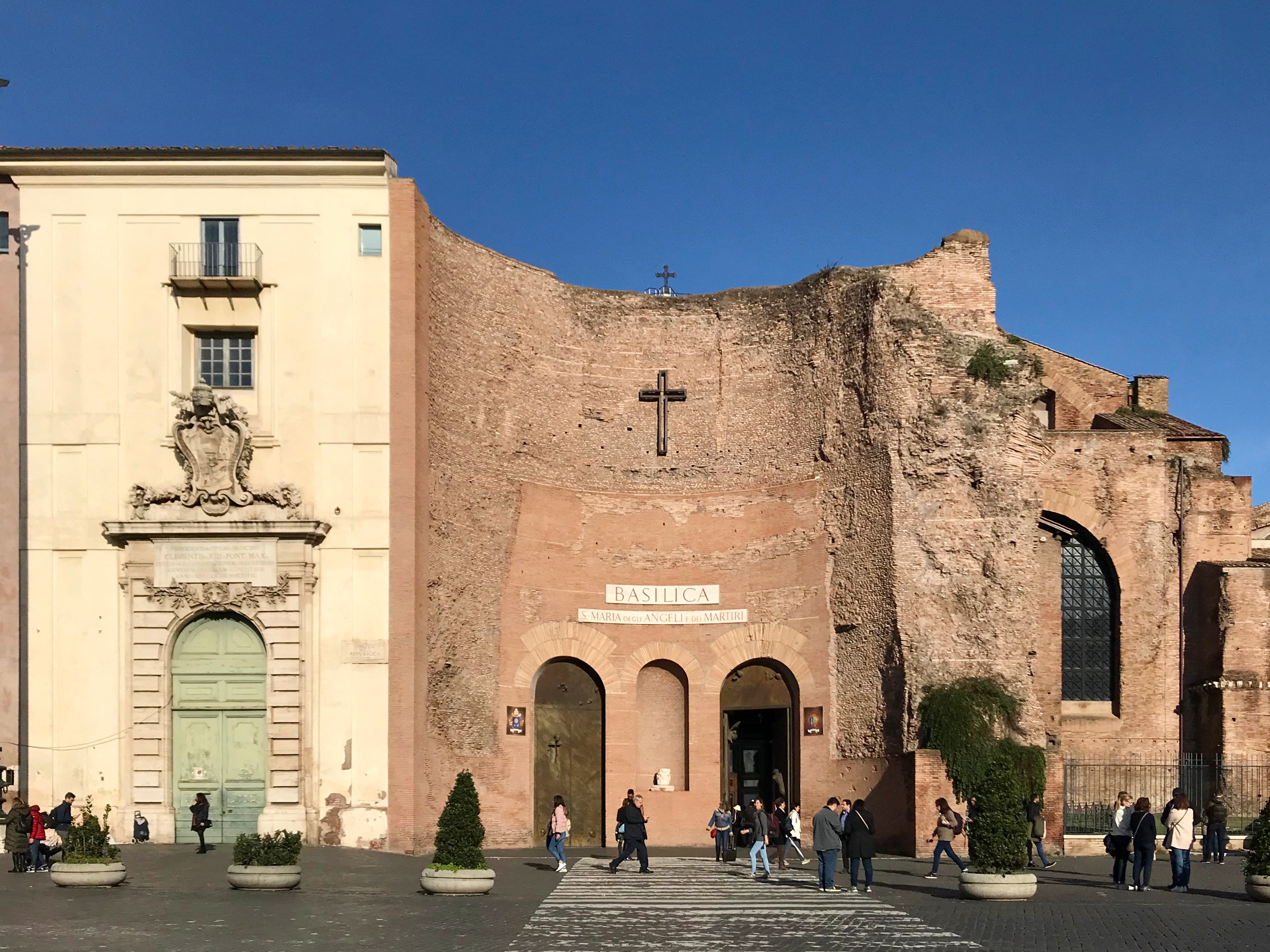
Santa Maria degli Angeli e dei Martiri

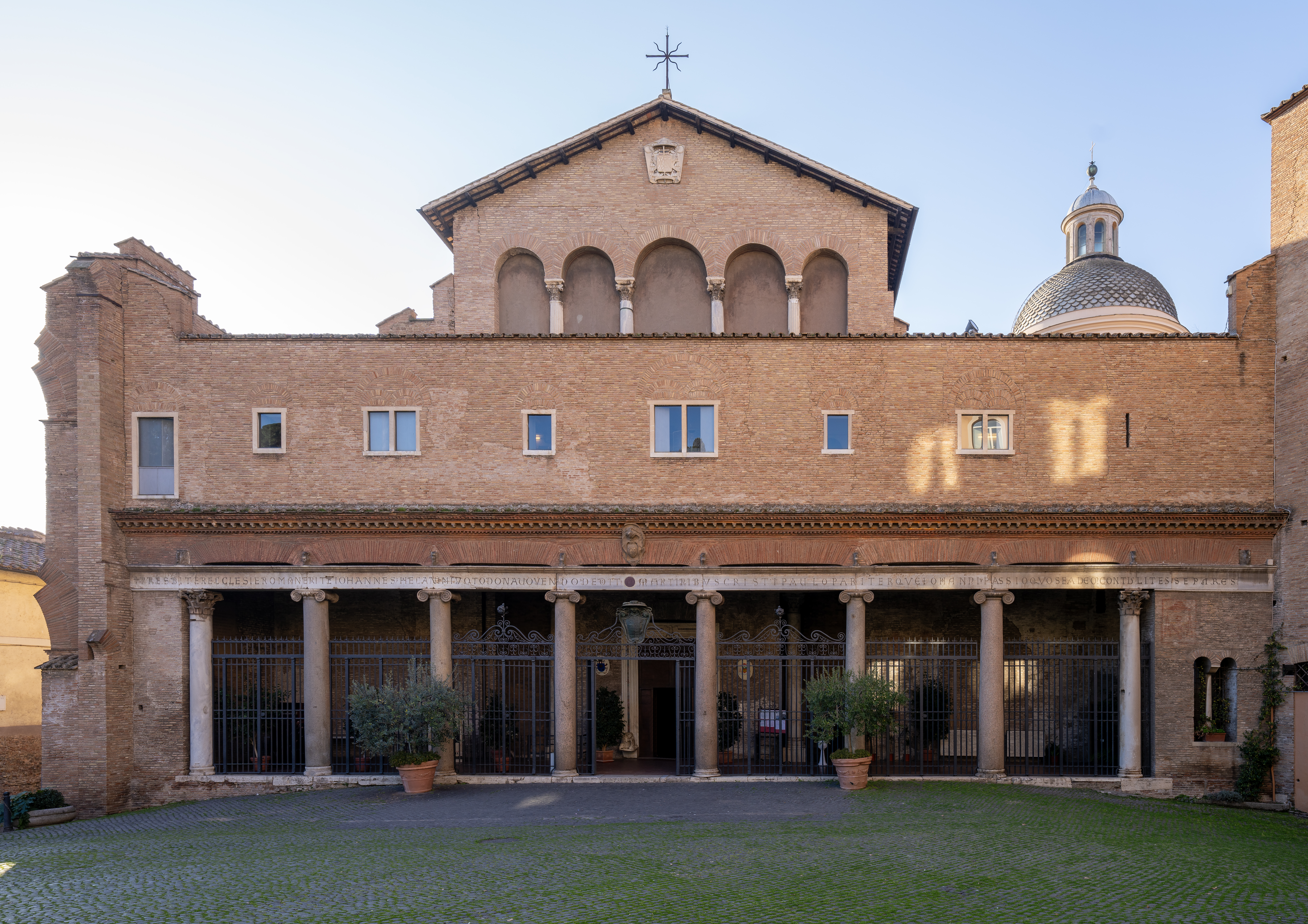
Santi Giovanni e Paolo al Celio

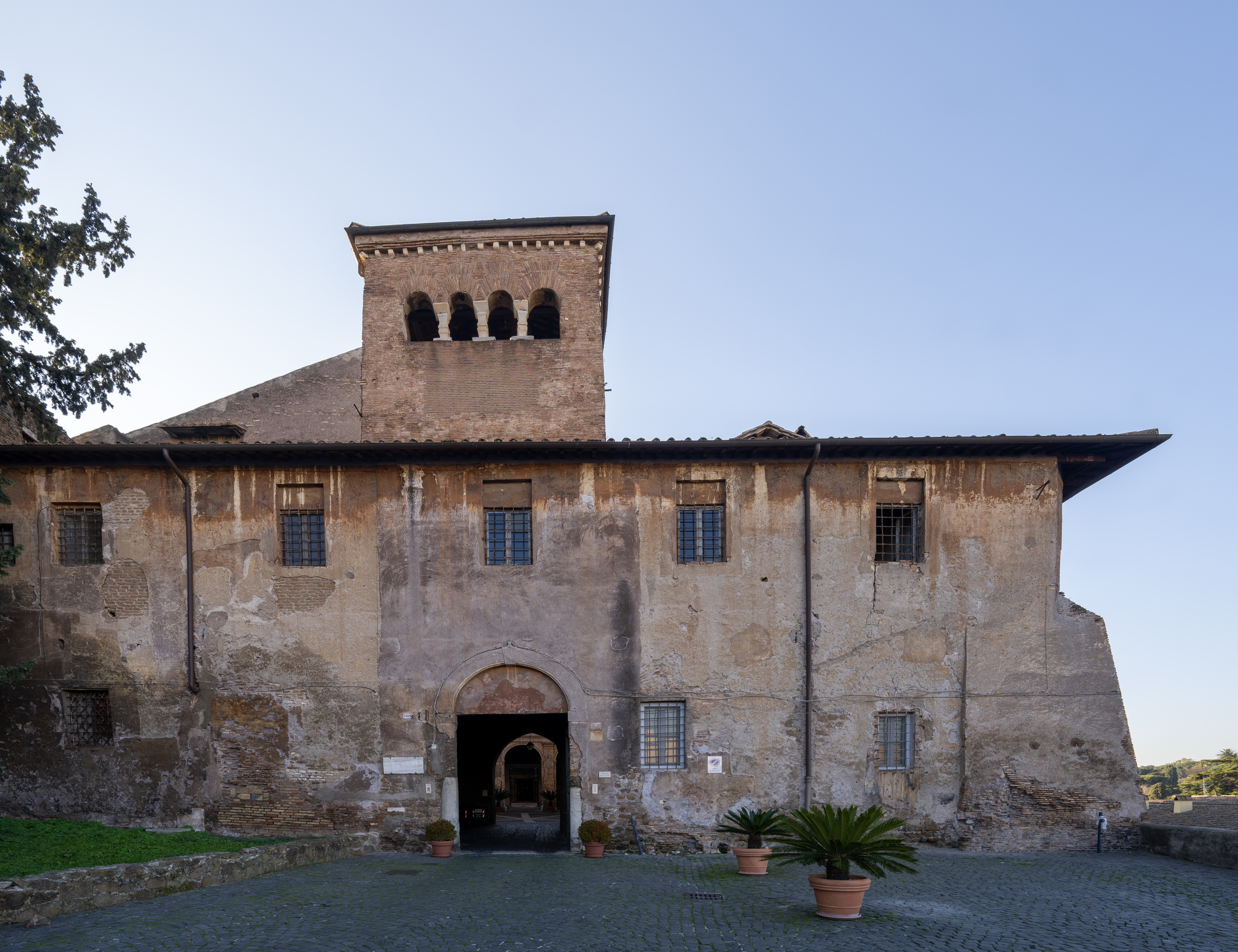
Santi Quattro Coronati

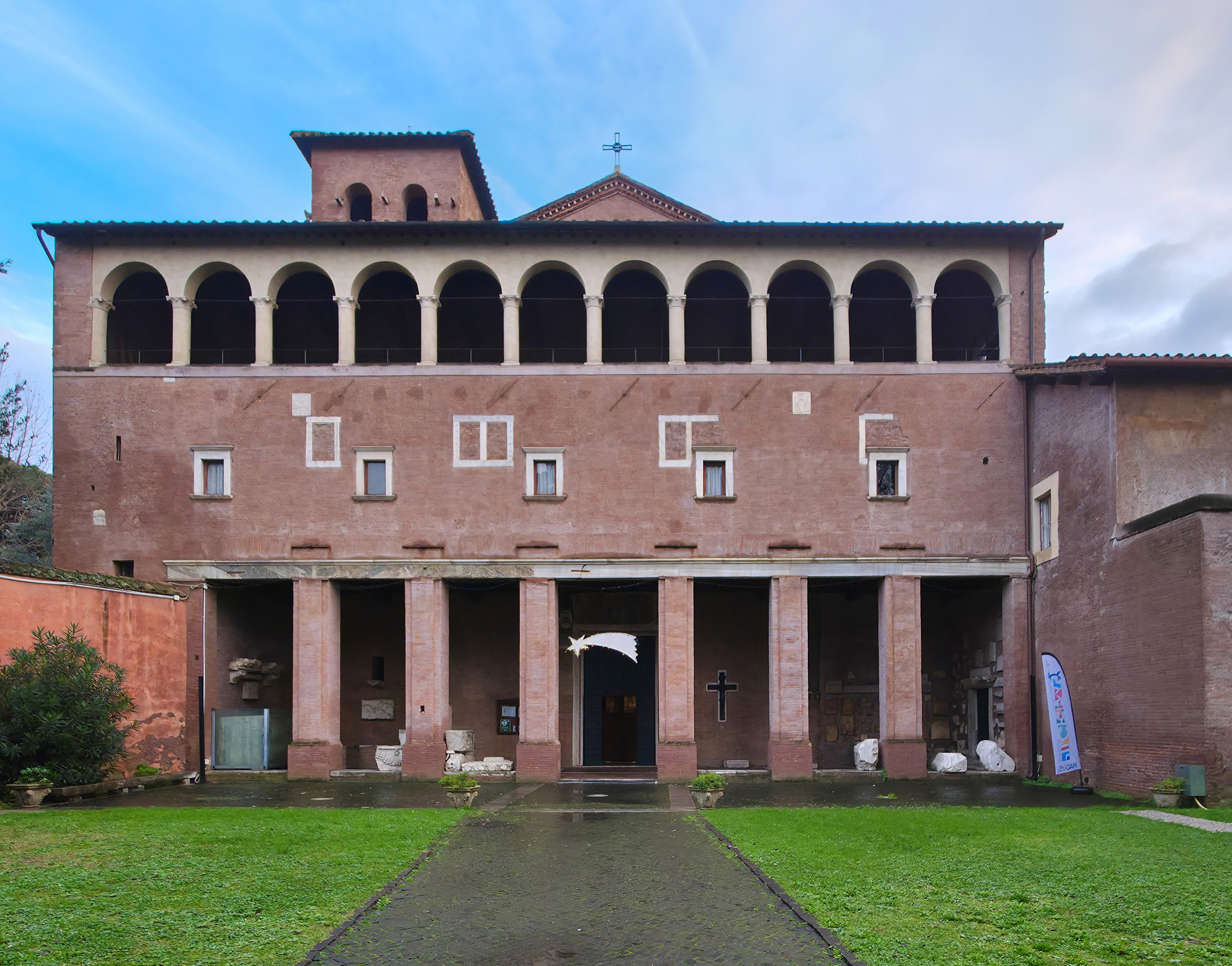
San Saba

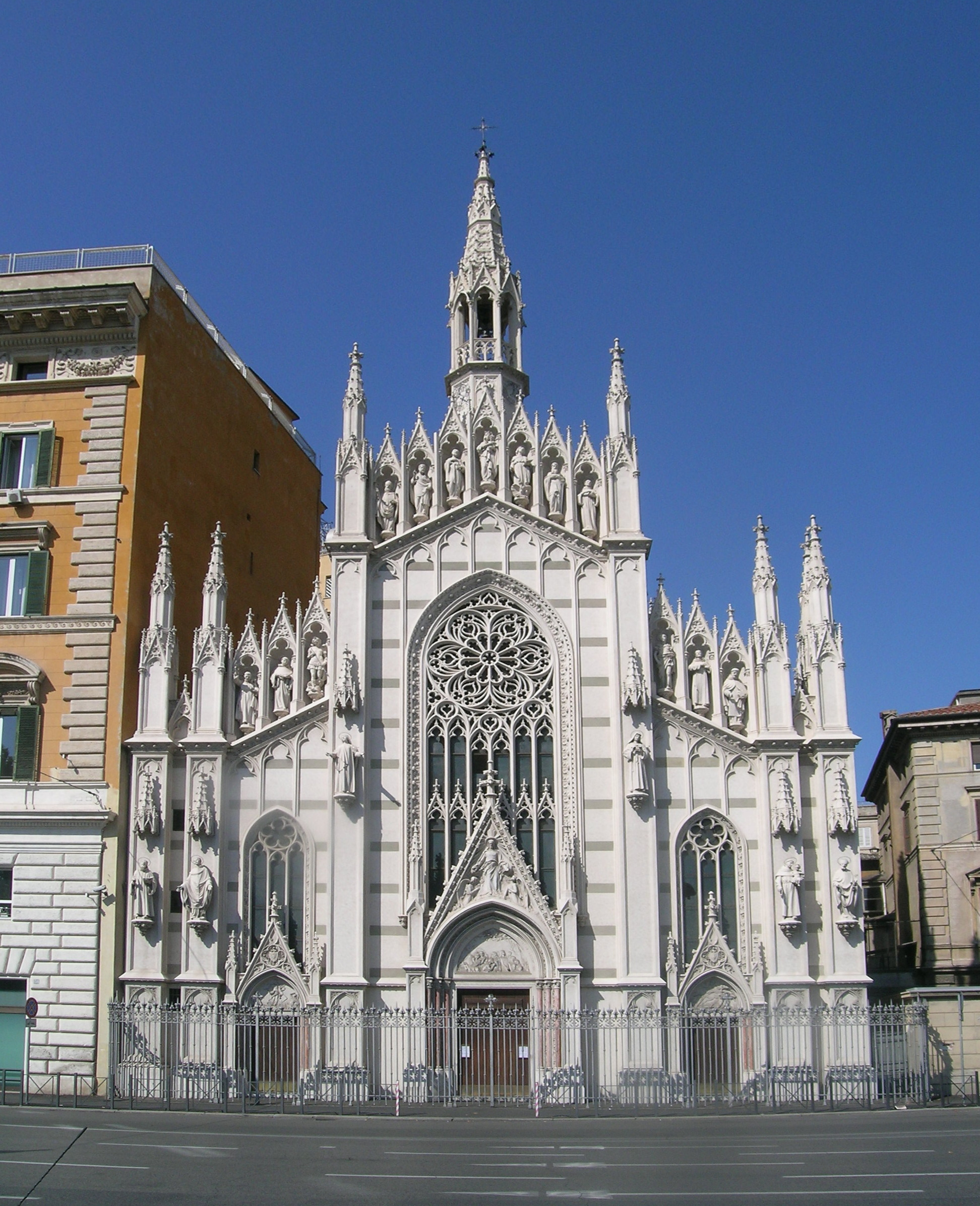
Sacro Cuore del Suffragio

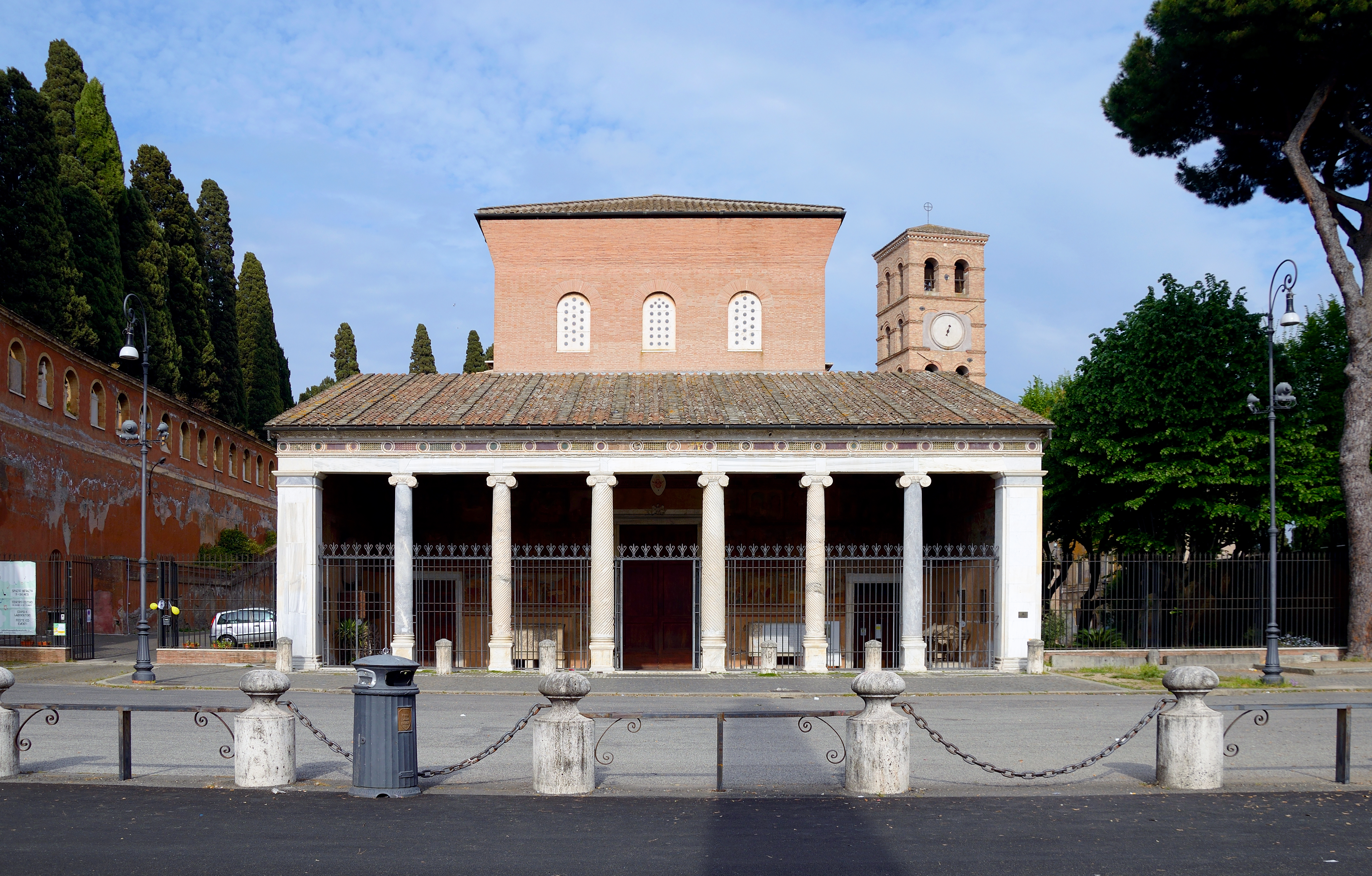
San Lorenzo fuori le mura

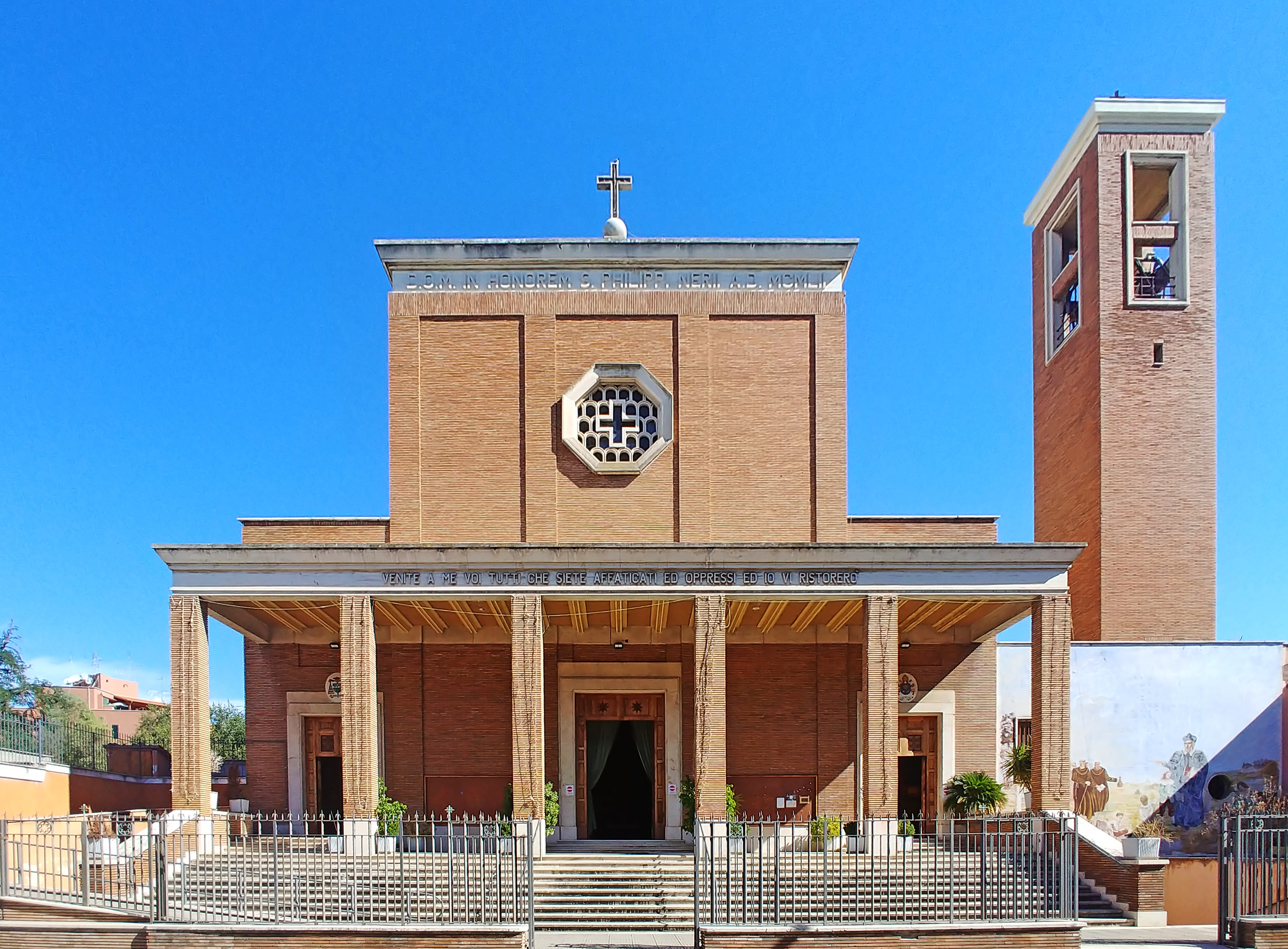
San Filippo Neri in Eurosia

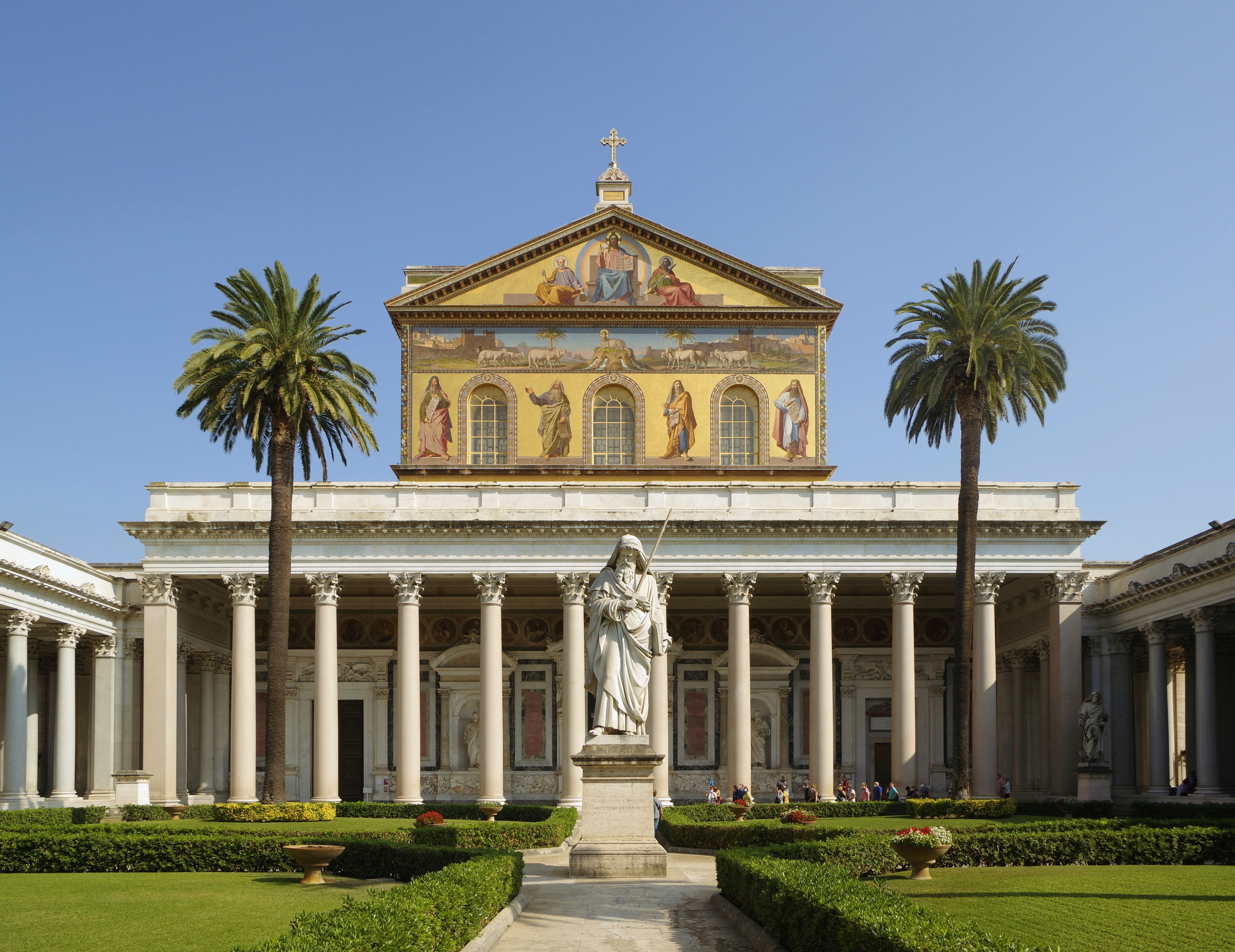
San Paolo fuori le mura

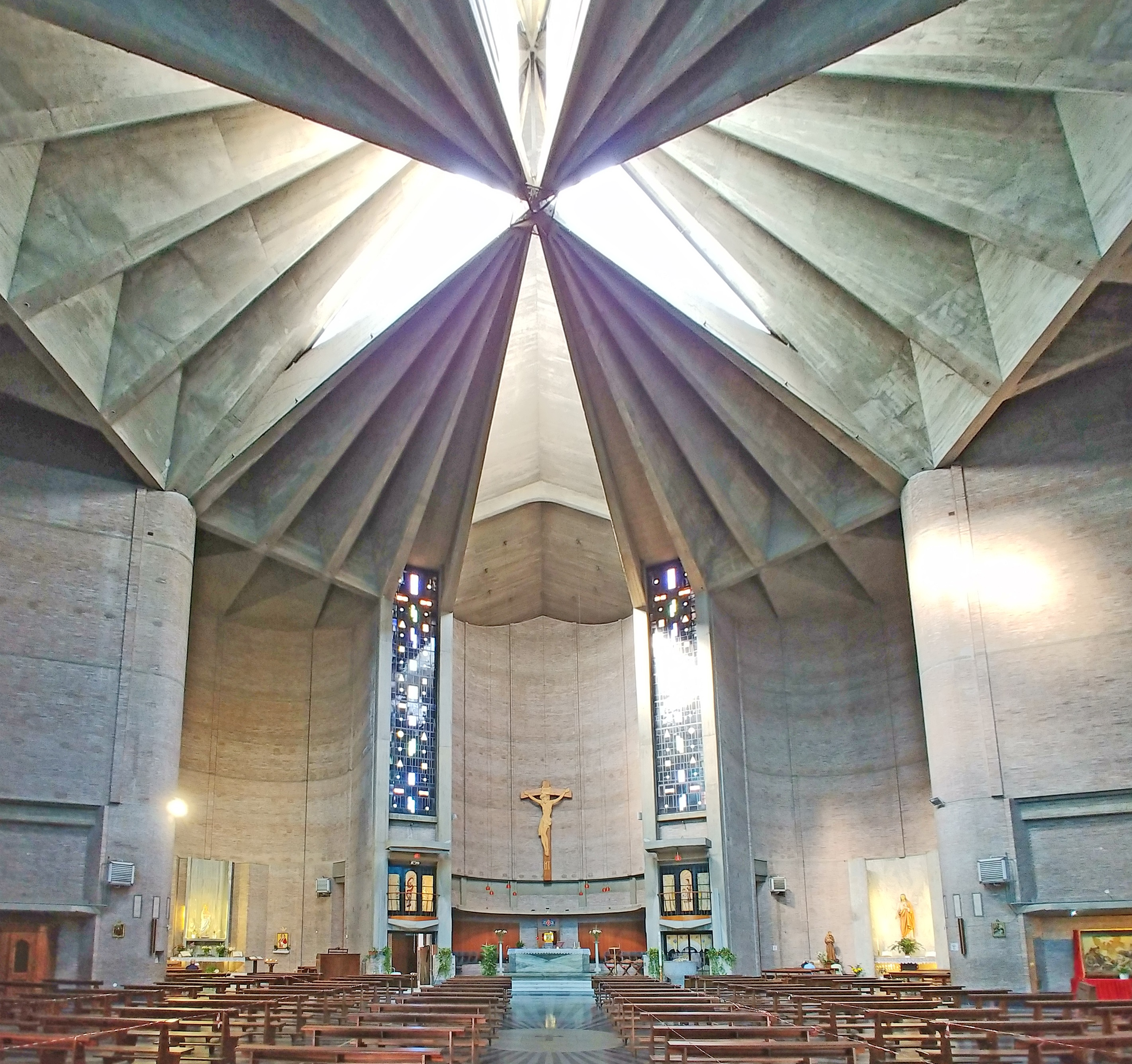
Interior of Nostra Signora de la Salette

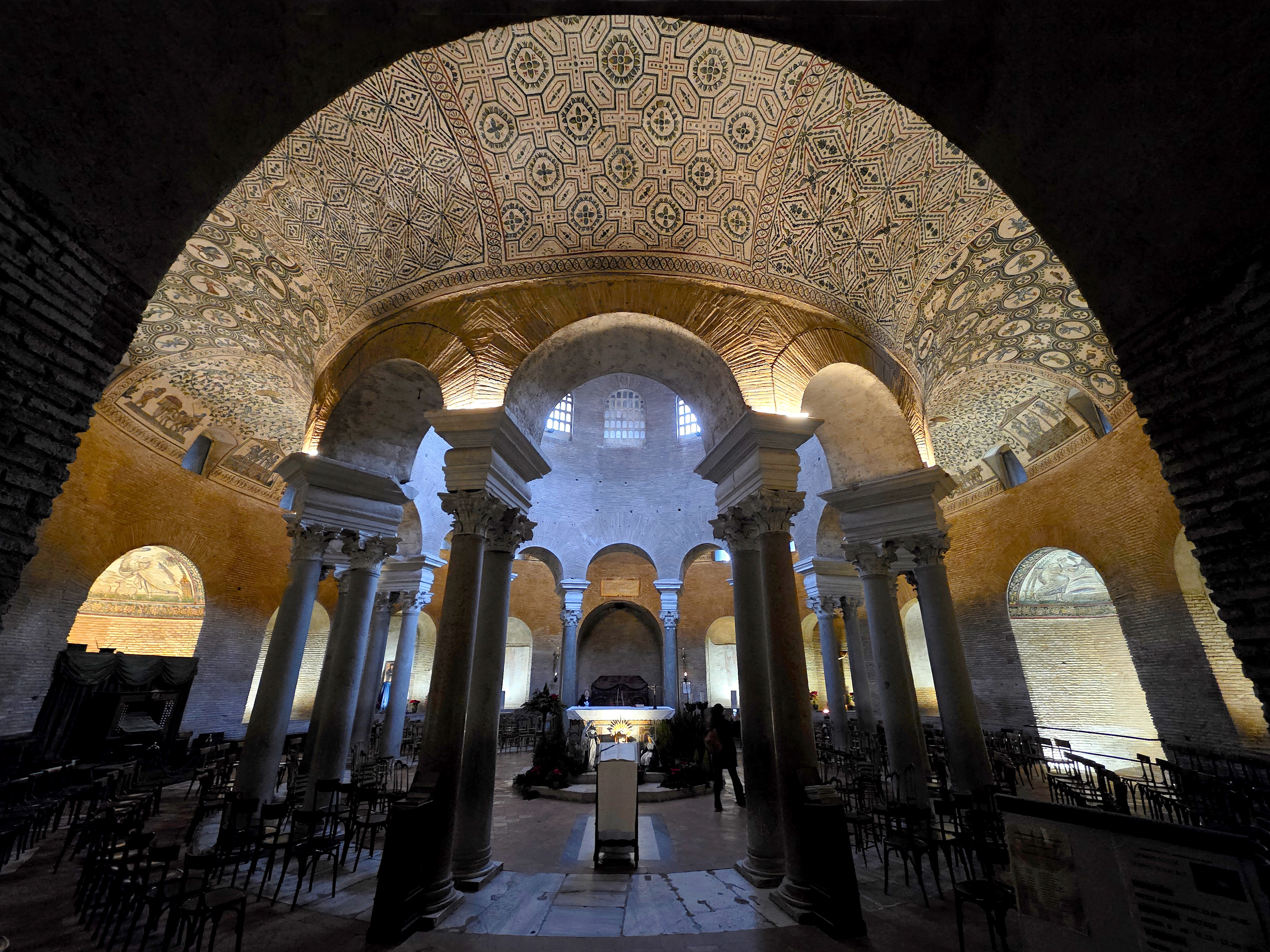
Interior of Santa Costanza

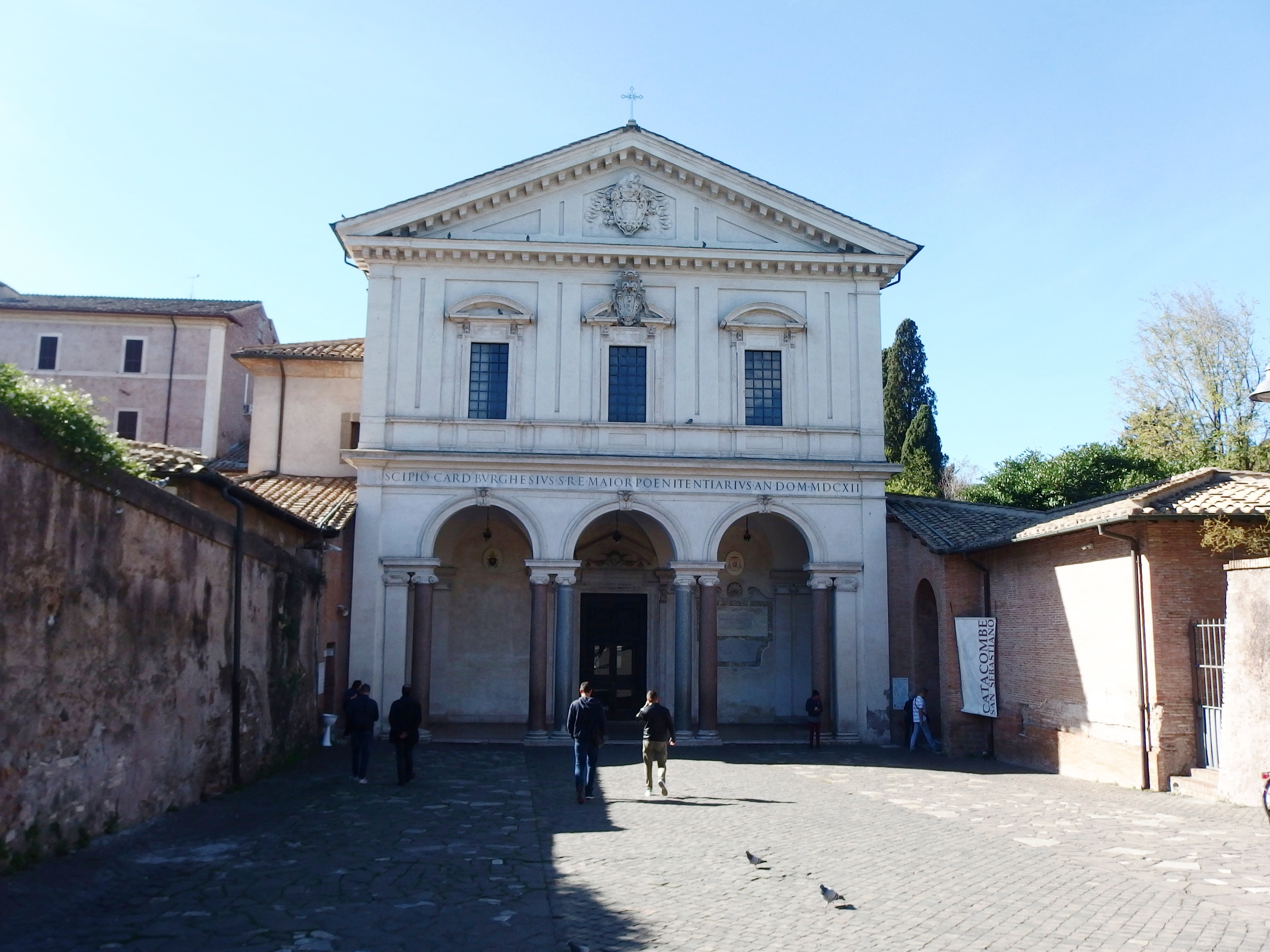
San Sebastiano fuori le mura

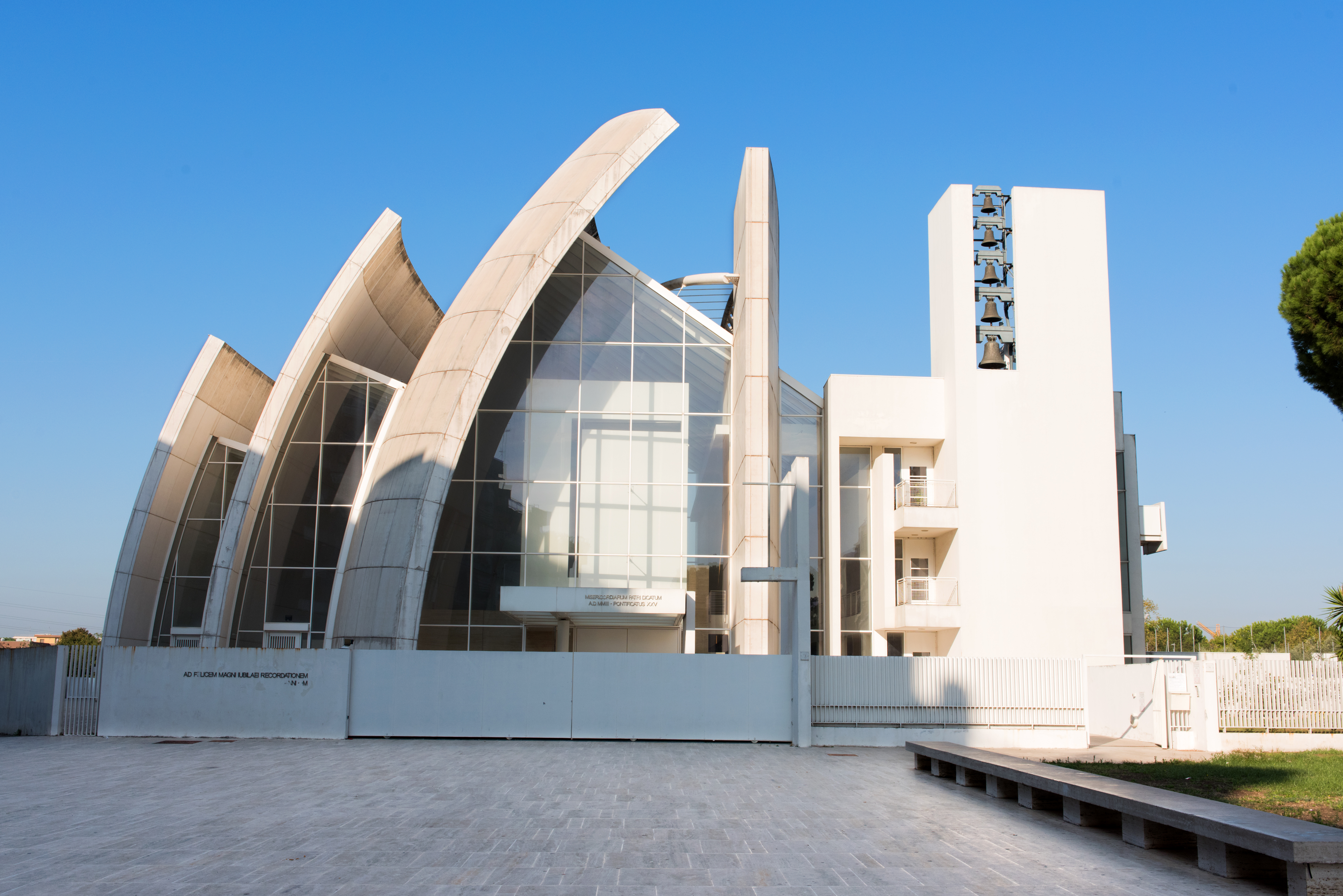
Jubilee Church

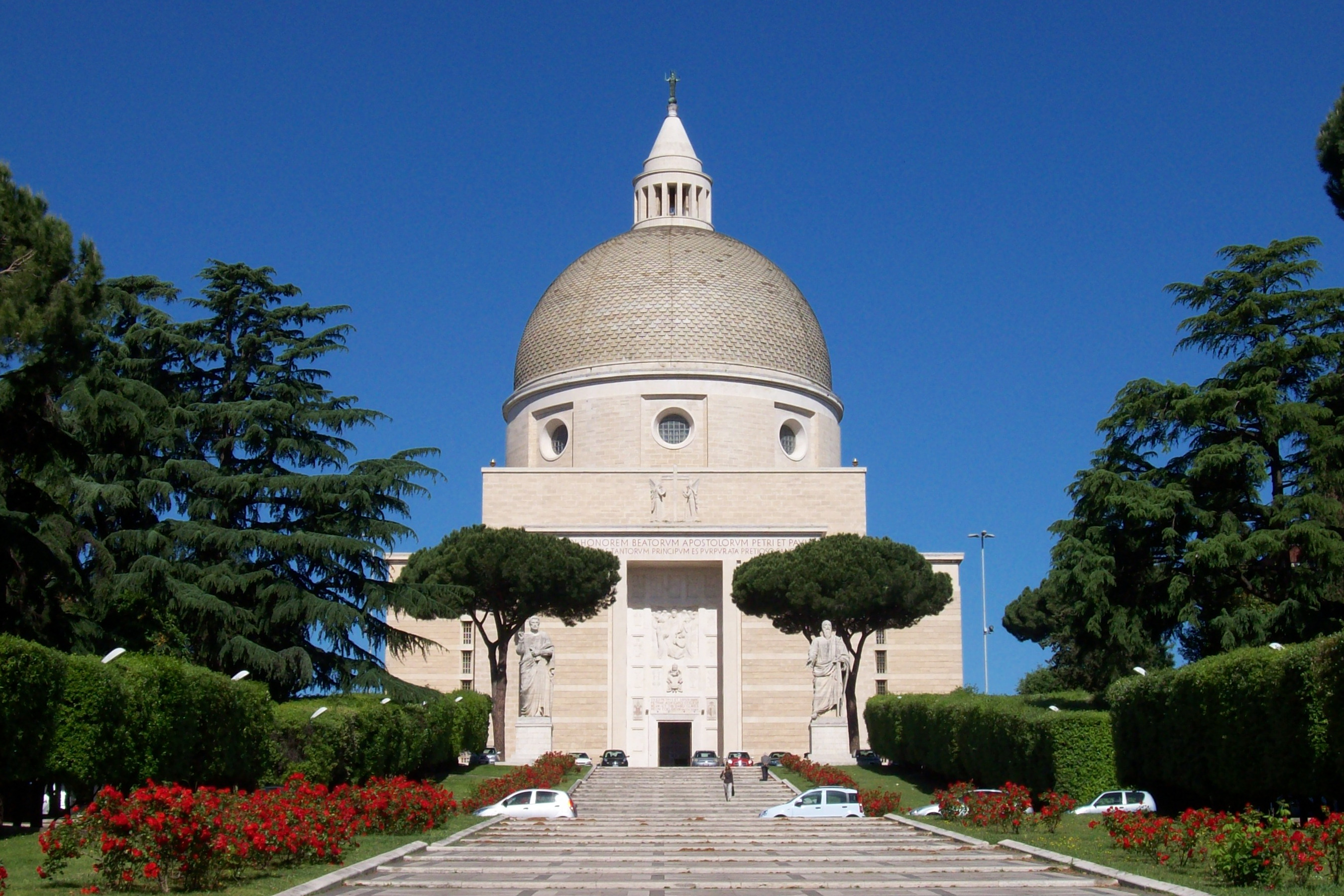
Santi Pietro e Paolo a Via Ostiense

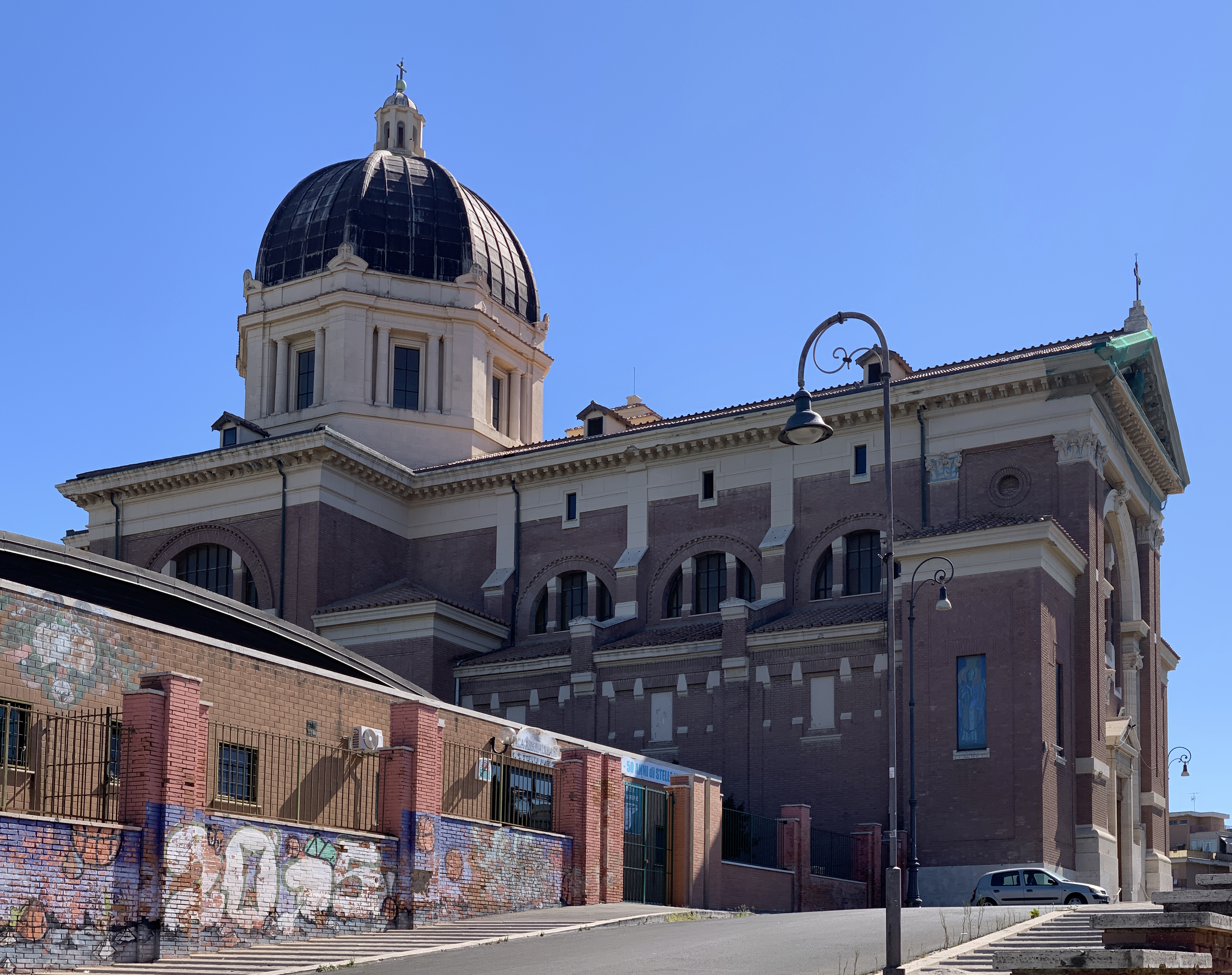
Santa Maria Regina Pacis a Ostia Lido

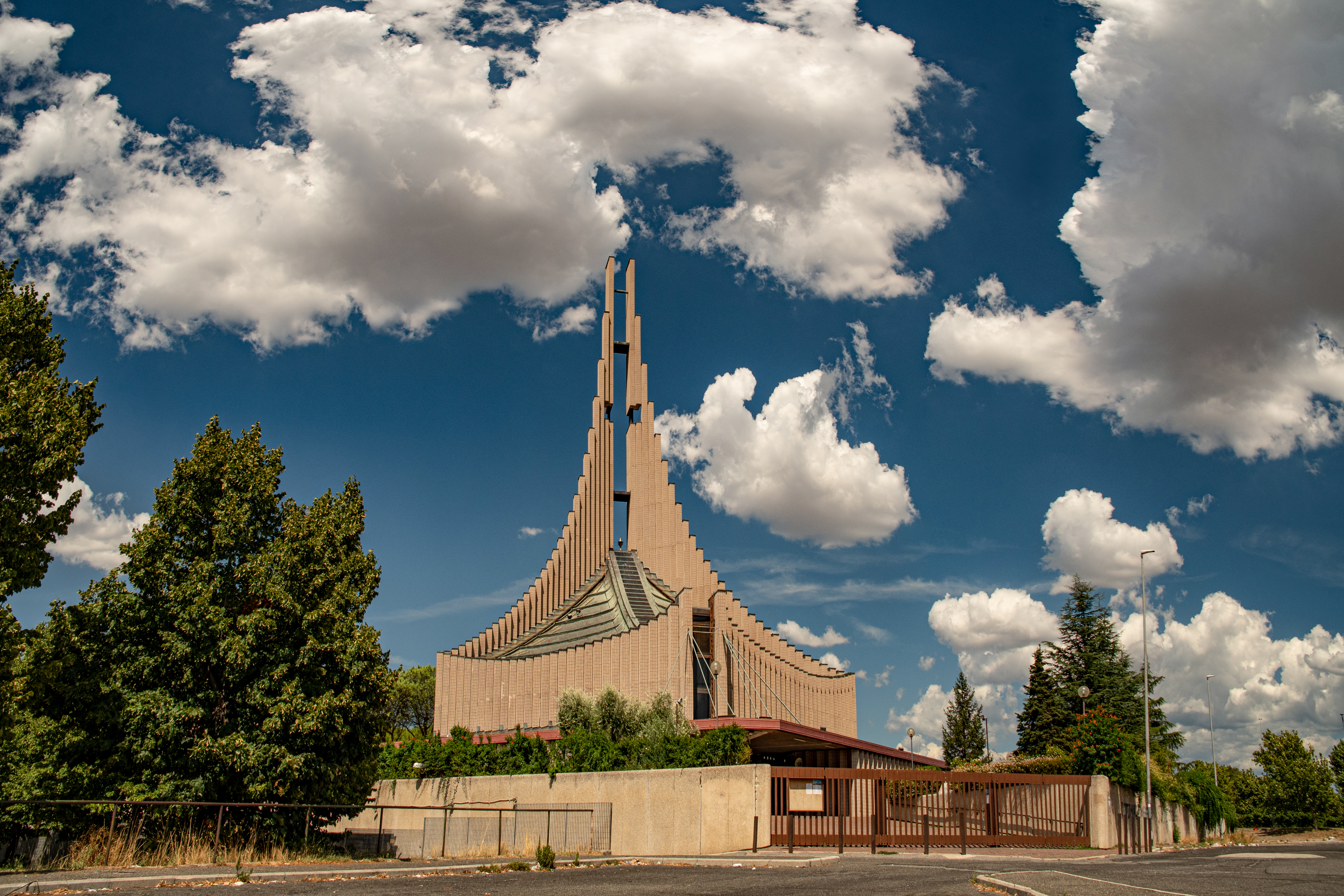
Santa Maria Madre del Redentore

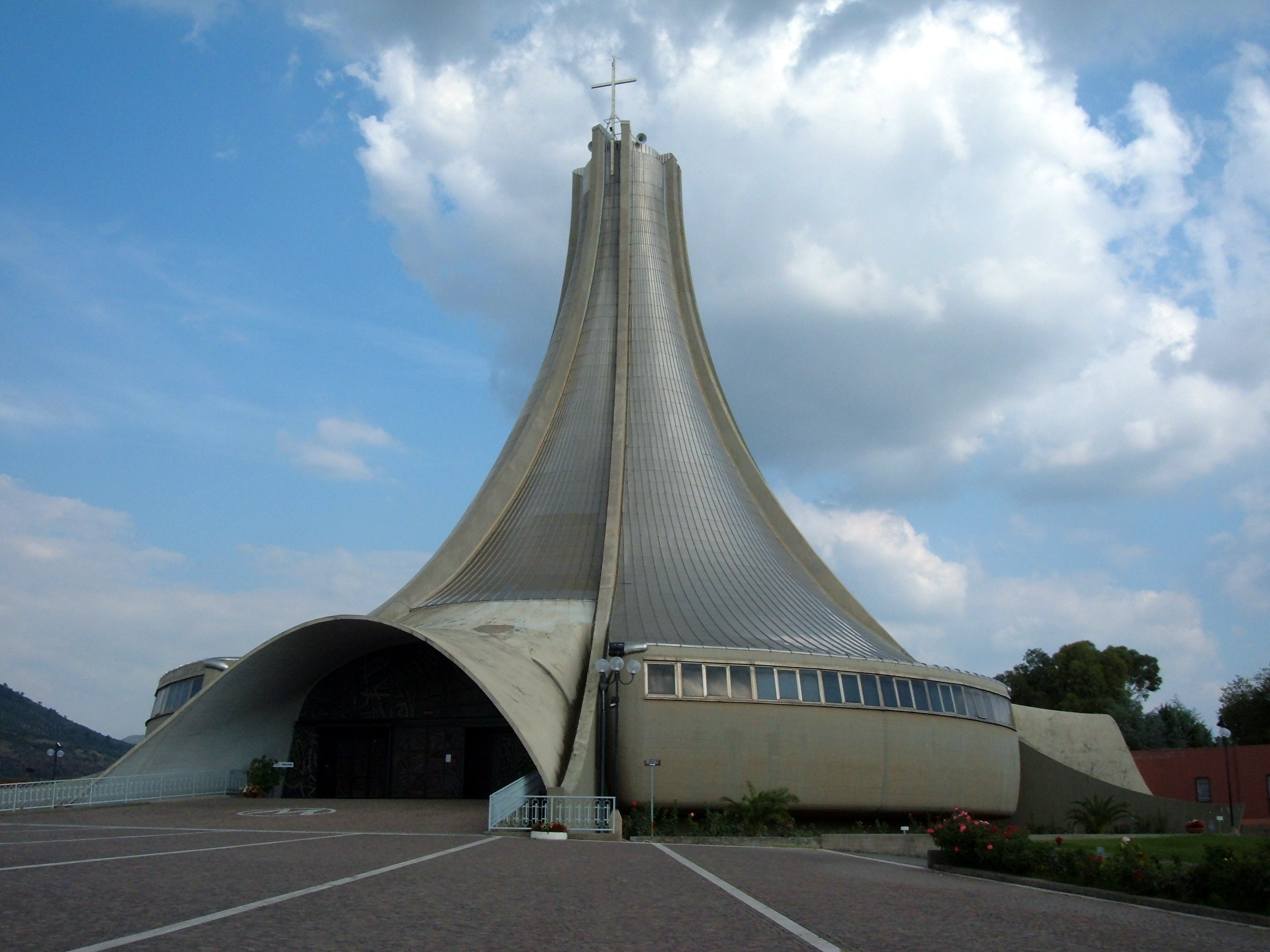
Santuario di Nostra Signora di Tatima a San Vittorino

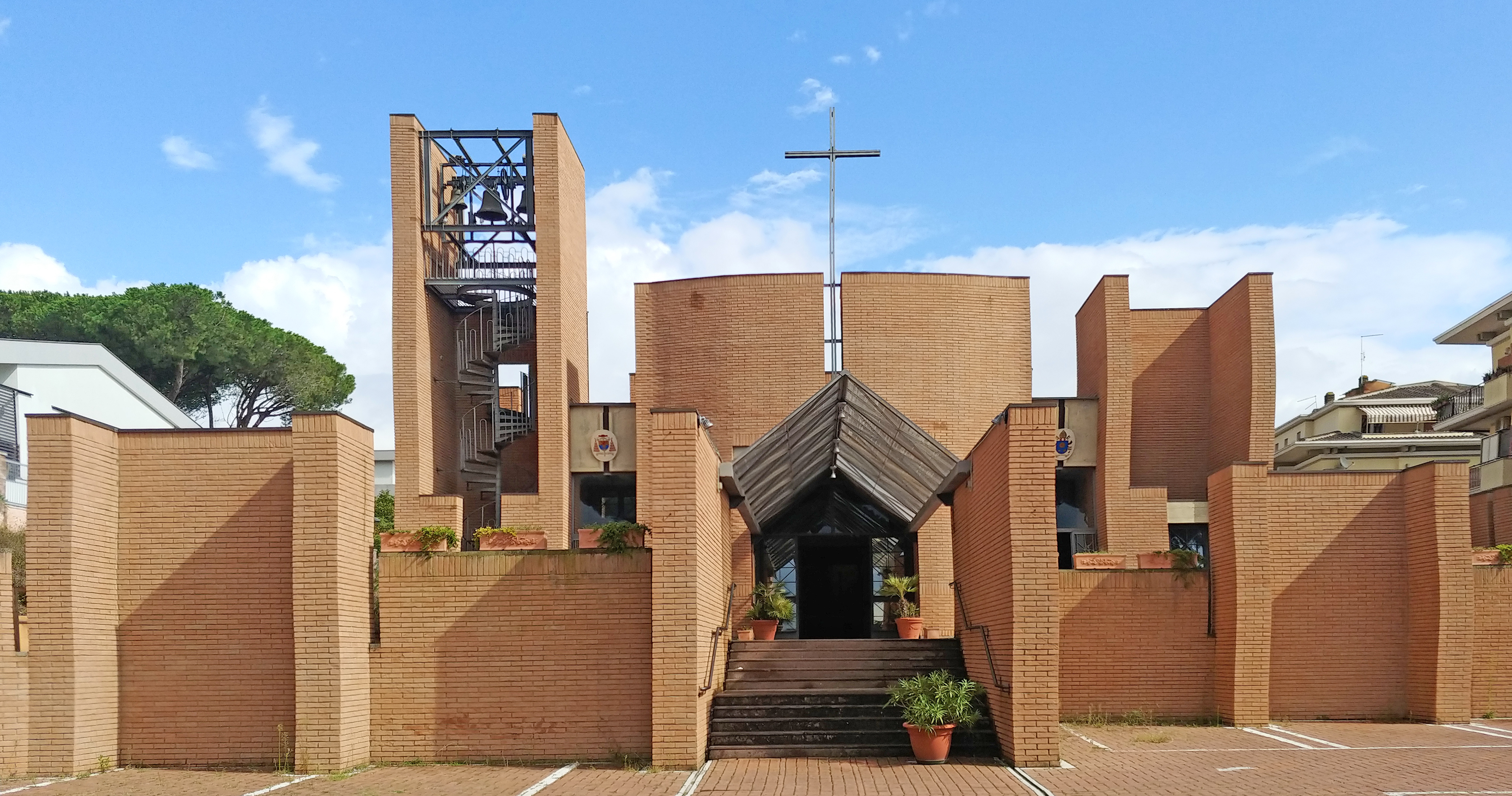
San Giuliano Martire

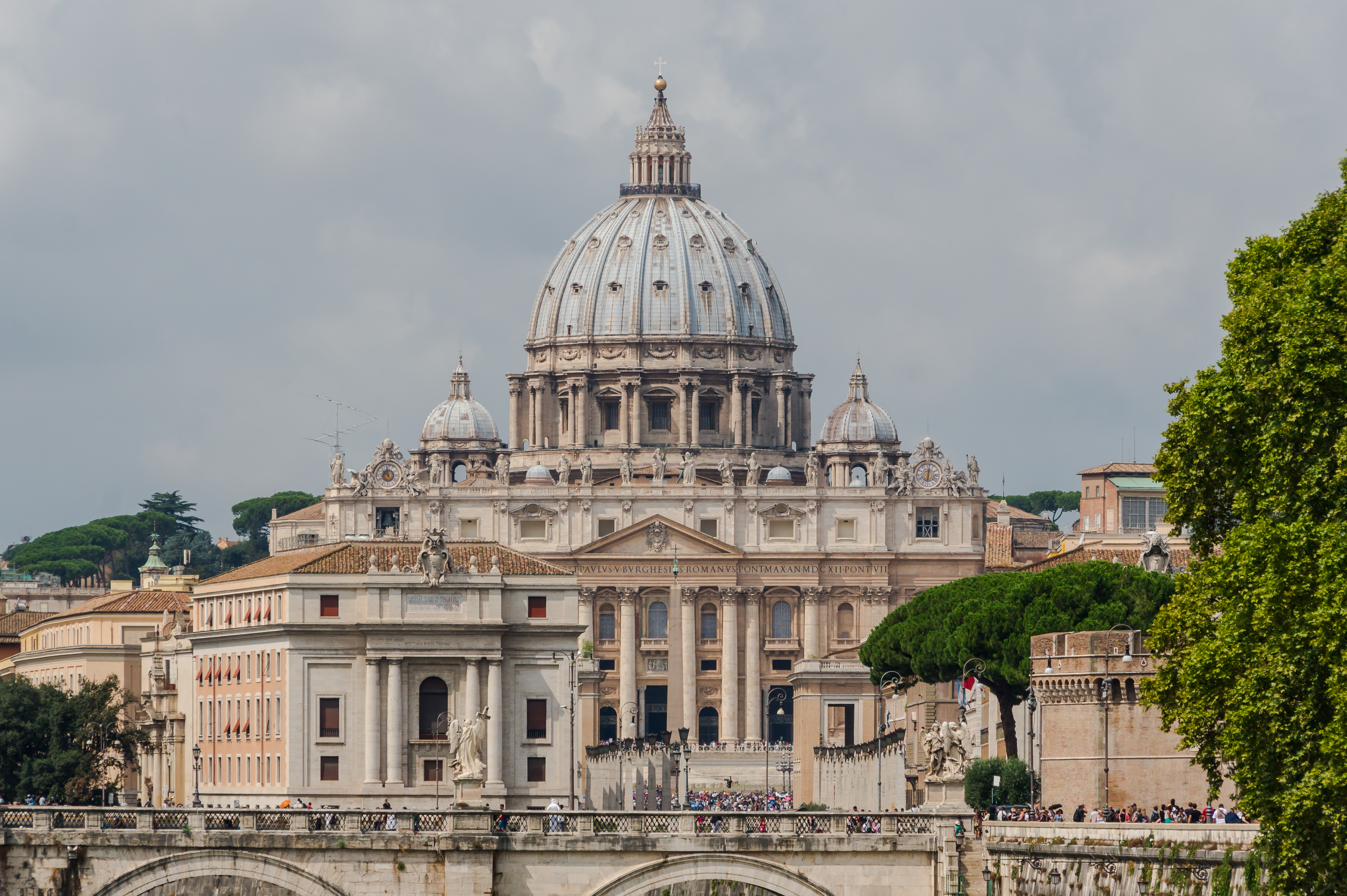
San Pietro in Vaticano

Churches in italics have no structural remains.

=== R. I Monti ===
- Sant'Agata de' Goti
- Sant'Agnese ad Duo Furna
- Sant Andrea e Bartolomeo
- Sant'Andrea al Quirinale
- Sant'Anna al Laterano
- San Basilio al Foro di Augusto
- Cappella di San Benedetto Giuseppe Labre ai Monti
- San Bernardino in Panisperna
- San Bernardo della Compagnia
- San Carlo alle Quattro Fontane
- Santa Caterina a Magnanapoli
- Santa Chiara al Quirinale
- Chiesa evangelica battista ai Monti
- San Ciriaco alle Terme Diocleziane
- San Clemente
- San Dionisio alle Quattro Fontane
- Santi Domenico e Sisto
- Sant'Eufemia al Foro Traiano
- San Filippo Neri all'Esquilino
- San Francesco di Paola ai Monti
- Chiesa di Gesù Bambino all'Esquilino
- Santi Gioacchino e Anna ai Monti
- Santi Gioacchino e Anna alle Quattro Fontane
- San Giovanni Battista dei Cavalieri di Rodi
- San Giovanni Laterano
  - Lateran Baptistry
  - Santa Maria delle Grazie nel Cimitero di San Giovanni in Laterano
  - San Lorenzo in Palatio ad Sancta Sanctorum
  - Oratorio del Santissimo Sacramento al Laterano
  - Oratorio di San Silvestro in Palatio
- San Giuseppe di Cluny
- San Lorenzo in Fonte
- San Lorenzo ai Monti
- San Lorenzo in Panisperna
- San Luca all'Esquilino
- Santa Lucia in Selci
- Santi Marcellino e Pietro al Laterano
- Santa Maria ad Busta Gallica
- Santa Maria Annunziata delle Turchine
- Santa Maria del Buon Consiglio
- Santa Maria in Campo Carleo
- Santa Maria in Carinis
- Santa Maria della Concezione ai Monti
- Santa Maria della Concezione dei Sacconi Turchini
- Santa Maria della Sanità
- Santa Maria inter Duo
- Santa Maria in Macello Martyrum
- Santa Maria delle Lauretane
- Santa Maria Maddalena al Quirinale
- Santa Maria della Neve al Coloseo
- Santa Maria ai Monti
- San Martino ai Monti
- Cappella della Mater Boni Consilii
- San Matteo in Merulana
- San Norberto all'Esquilino
- San Paolo primo eremita
- San Pietro in Vincoli
- Santa Prassede
  - Sacello di San Zenone
- Oratorio del Preziosissimo Sangue
- Santa Pudenziana
- Santi Quirico e Giulitta
- San Salvatore ad Tres Images
- San Salvatore ai Monti
- Santa Maria della Purificazione ai Monti
- Santa Maria della Purificazione in Via Merulana
- Santi Sergio e Bacco
- Santo Spirito ai Monti
- Santo Stefano al Monte Celio
- Sant'Urbano a Campo Carleo
- Oratorio della Santissima Vergine Addolorata
- San Vitale

=== R. II Trevi ===
- Sant’Andrea de Biberatica
- Sant'Andrea degli Scozzesi
- St Andrew’s Church
- Santi Angeli Custodi al Tritone
- Santi Apostoli
- San Basilio agli Orti Sallustiani
- Santi Claudio e Andrea dei Borgognoni
- Santa Croce e San Bonaventura alla Pilotta
- Oratorio del Santissimo Crocifisso
- Oratorio del Santissimo Crocifisso Agonizzante in Arcione
- San Giovanni Berchmans
- San Giovanni della Ficozza
- San Lorenzo de Biberatica
- Santa Maria Causa Nostra Laetitiae
- San Marcello al Corso
- Santa Maria del Carmine alle Tre Cannelle
- Santa Maria della Neve dei Foglianti
- Santa Maria in Trivio
- Santa Maria dell’Umiltà
- Santa Maria in Via
- Santa Maria di Loreto
- San Nicola da Tolentino agli Orti Sallustiani
- Oratorio del Beato Nicola de Rupe
- San Nicola in Arcione
- Santissimo Nome di Maria al Foro Traiano
- San Pietro Canisio agli Orti Sallustiani
- Santa Rita da Cascia alle Vergini
- San Romualdo
- Oratorio del Santissimo Sacramento
- San Silvestro al Quirinale
- Santa Susanna
- Chiesa evangelica valdese in Trevi
- Santi Vincenzo e Anastasio a Trevi

=== R. III Colonna ===
- Sant'Andrea della Colonna
- Santi Andrea e Francesco da Paola delle Fratte
- Sant'Andrea delle Fratte
- Santi Bartolomeo ed Alessandro dei Bergamaschi
- Santa Maria in San Giovannino
- Santa Croce e Montecitorio
- Santa Francesca Romana a Strada Felice
- San Giuseppe a Capo le Case
- Santi Ildefonso e Tomasso da Villanova
- San Lorenzo in Lucina
- San Macuto
- Santa Maria Maddalena
- Santa Maria in Aquiro
- Santa Maria Odigitria al Tritone
- San Paolo alla Colonna
- Cappella dei Re Magi
- San Silvestro in Capite
- Santo Stefano del Trullo
- Santissima Trinità della Missione

=== R. IV Campo Marzio ===
- All Saints' Church
- Sant'Ambrogio e Carlo al Corso
- Sant'Antonio dei Portoghesi
- Sant'Atanasio
- Santa Maria del Divino Amore
- San Gaetano alla Villa Medici
- Gesù e Maria
- San Giacomo in Augusta
- San Giorgio e Martiri Inglesi
- San Giovanni Battista de La Salle alla Piazza di Spagna
- San Girolamo dei Croati
- Santi Giuseppe e Orsola
- San Gregorio Nazianzeno
- San Gregorio dei Muratori
- Sant'Ivo dei Bretoni
- Santi Lucia della Tinta
- Santa Maria della Concezione in Campo Marzio
- Santa Maria del Popolo
- Santa Maria dei Miracoli
- Santa Maria in Montesanto
- Santa Maria Portae Paradisi
- San Nicola dei Prefetti
- Resurrezione di Nostro Signore Gesù Cristo
- San Rocco
- Rome Baptist Church
- Santissimo Sacramento di San Lorenzo in Lucina
- Santissimo Sacramento e Santa Caterina da Siena
- San Trifone in Posterula
- Santissima Trinità a Via Condotti
- Trinità dei Monti

=== R. V Ponte ===
- Sant'Angelo de Miccinellis
- Sant'Anna dei Bresciani
- Sant'Apollinare alle Terme Neroniane-Alessandrine
- San Biagio della Pagnotta
- San Biagio della Fossa
- San Celsino
- Santi Celso e Giuliano
- Oratorio dei Santi Cosma e Damiano in Banchi
- San Giovanni Decollato a Ponte Sant'Angelo
- San Giovanni dei Fiorentini
- Oratorio del Gonfalone
- Santa Maria della Purificazione in Banchi
- Santa Maria in Posterula
- Cappella di Santa Maria Maddalena
- Santa Maria del Suffragio
- Santa Maria dell'Anima
- Santa Maria della Pace
- Sant'Orsola della Pietà
- San Pantaleo iuxta Flumen
- San Salvatore de Inversis
- San Salvatore in Primicerio
- San Salvatore in Lauro
- Cappella dei Santi Innocenti
- San Simeone Profeta
- Santi Simone e Giuda

=== R. VI Parione ===
- Sant'Agnese in Agone
- Santa barbara dei Librai
- Santa Cecilia de Turre Campi
- Sant'Elisabetta dei Fornari
- Oratorio dei Filippini
- San Lorenzo in Damaso
- Santa Maria in Grottapinta
- Santa Maria in Vallicella
- Natività di Gesù
- San Nicola dei Lorenesi
- Nostra Signora del Sacro Cuore
- San Pantaleo
- Oratorio del Santissimo Sacramento e delle Cinque Piaghe
- Santo Stefano in Piscinula
- San Tommaso in Parione

=== R. VII Regola ===
- Sant'Andrea de Azanesi
- San Bartolomeo dei Vaccinari
- San Benedetto in Arenula
- Santa Brigida
- Santa Caterina della Rota
- Santa Caterina da Siena a Via Giulia
- Sant'Eligio degli Orefici
- San Filippo Neri in Via Giulia
- San Francesco d'Assisi a Ponte Sisto
- San Giovanni in Ayno
- Santi Giovanni Evangelista e Petronio
- San Girolamo della Carità
- Santa Lucia del Gonfalone
- Santa Maria dei Calderari
- Santa Maria in Monticelli
- Santa Maria dell'Orazione e Morte
- Santa Maria del Pianto
- Santa Maria della Querica
- Santa Maria in Monserrato degli Spagnoli
- San Martino ai Pelamantelli
- San Nicola degli Incoronati
- San Paolo alla Regola
- San Salvatore in Campo
- San Salvatore in Onda
- Santo Spirito dei Napoletani
- Santa Teresa a Monserrato
- Santi Teresa e Giovanni della Croce dei Carmelitani
- Chiesa di San Tommaso di Canterbury
- San Tommaso ai Cenci
- Santissima Trinità dei Pellegrini
- Santi Vincenzo e Anastasio alla Regola

=== R. VIII Sant'Eustachio ===
- Sant'Agostino
- Sant'Andrea della Valle
- Sant'Anna dei Falegnami
- Sant'Eustachio
- Chiesa evangelica battista di via del Teatro Valle
- Santi Benedetto e Scholastica
- San Carlo ai Catinari
- Santi Cosma e Damiano de Monte Granato
- Sant'Elena dei Credenzieri
- Chiesa di Gesù Nazareno
- San Giuliano dei Fiamminghi
- Sant'Ivo alla Sapienza
- San Luigi dei Francesi
- Santa Maria in Monterone
- San Salvatore alle Coppelle
- Santissimo Sudario all'Argentina

=== R. IX Pigna ===
- Chiesa del Gesù
- Santa Chiara
- San Francesco Saverio del Caravita
- San Giovanni della Pigna
- Sant'Ignazio
- Santa Lucia alle Botteghe Oscure
- San Macuto
- San Marco
- Santa Maria ad Martyres (Pantheon)
- Santa Maria Annunziata dei Gesuiti
- Santa Maria de Astallis
- Santa Maria sopra Minerva
- Santa Maria in Via Lata
- Santa Marta al Collegio Romano
- San Nicola dei Cesarini
- San Nicola de Forbitoribus
- Santo Stefano del Cacco
- Santissime Stimmate di San Francesco

=== R. X Campitelli ===
- Sant'Adriano al Foro
- Sant'Anastasia al Palatino
- Sant'Andrea in Vincis
- San Biagio de Mercato
- San Bonaventura al Palatino
- Chiesa di San Cesareo in Palatio
- Santi Cosma e Damiano
- Santa Francesca Romana
- San Giuseppe dei Falegnami
  - San Pietro in Carcere
- Oratorio di San Gregorio Taumaturgo
- San Lorenzo in Nicholanaso
- San Lorenzo in Miranda
- Santi Luca e Martina
- Santa Maria Annunziata a Tor de' Specchi
- Santa Maria Antiqua
  - Oratorio dei Quaranta Martiri
- Santa Maria della Consolazione
- Santa Maria de Metrio
- Oratorio di Santa Maria del Riscatto
- Santa Maria in Ara Coeli
- Santa Maria in Vincis
- Santa Maria Liberatrice al Foro Romano
- Sante Orsola e Caterina
- San Salvatore de Arcu Trasi
- San Sebastiano al Palatino
- Santi Sergio e Bacco al Foro Romano
- San Teodoro
- Santi Venanzio e Ansovino

=== R. XI Sant'Angelo ===
- Sant'Ambrogio della Massima
- Sant'Angelo in Pescheria
  - Oratorio di Sant'Andrea dei pescivendoli
- Santa Caterina dei Funari
- Santa Cecilia all'Arco Savello
- Santa Cecilia de Pantaleis
- Santa Cecilia della Fossa
- San Leonardo de Albis
- Santa Maria in Campitelli
- San Gregorio della Divina Pietà
- Santa Maria del Carmine e del Monte Libano
- Santa Maria in Publicolis
- Santa Rita da Cascia in Campitelli
- Santi Sebastiano e Valentino
- Santo Stanislao dei Polacchi

=== R. XII Ripa ===
- Sant'Aniano dei Ciabattini
- Sant'Anna a Ripa
- Sant'Anselmo all'Aventino
- San Bartolomeo all'Isola
- Santi Bonifacio ed Alessio
- Santa Maria in Cosmedin
- Sant'Eligio dei Ferrari
- Santa Galla
- Oratorio di Gesù al Calvario e di Maria
- San Giorgio in Velabro
- San Giovanni Calibita
- San Giovanni Battista Decollato
- San Lazzaro alla Marmorata
- Chiesa di Santa Maria Egiziaca
- Santa Maria del Priorato
- Santa Maria del Sole
- San Nicola in Carcere
- Sant'Omobono
- Santa Prisca
- Santa Sabina
- San Vincenzo de Paoli all'Aventino

=== R. XIII Trastevere ===
- Sant'Agata in Trastevere
- Sant'Andrea dei Vascellari
- Sant'Antonio Maria Zaccaria
- Chiesa di Sant'Apollonia
- Chiesa evangelica battista in Trastevere
- San Benedetto in Piscinula
- Santa Bonosa
- San Callisto
- Santa Cecilia in Trastevere
- San Cosimato
- San Crisogono
- Santa Croce alla Lungara
- Sacro Cuore di Gesù a Villa Lante
- Santa Dorotea
- Sant'Edmondo
- Sant'Egidio
- Sant'Eligio dei Sellai
- San Francesco a Ripa
- San Giacomo alla Lungara
- San Giovanni Battista dei Genovesi
- San Giovanni della Malva in Trastevere
- San Giuseppe alla Lungara
- San Leonardo in Settignano
- Santa Margherita in Trastevere
- Santa Maria del Buon Viaggio
- Santa Maria in Cappella
- Santa Maria della Clemenza
- Santa Maria della Visitazione e San Francesco di Sales
- Santi Maria e Gallicano
- Cappella di Santa Maria Maddalena nell'Ospedale dei Pazzi
- Santa Maria Regina Coeli alla Lungara
- Santa Maria dei Sette Dolori
- Santa Maria in Trastevere
  - Oratorio di Santa Maria Addolorata in Trastevere
- Santa Maria della Luce
- Santa Maria dell'Orto
- Santa Maria della Scala
- Sant'Onofrio
- San Pietro in Montorio
- Santi Quaranta Martiri e San Pasquale Baylon
- Sante Rufina e Seconda
- Chiesa di Santa Teresa del Bambin Gesù

=== R. XIV Borgo ===
- Oratorio di San Filippo Neri in Borgo
- Cappella di San Francesco Borgia dei Gesuiti
- San Giacomo Scossacavalli
- San Lorenzo in Piscibus
- Santa Maria Annunziata in Borgo
- Santa Maria della Purità
- Santa Maria della Pietà in Camposanto dei Teutonici
- Santa Maria delle Grazie a Porta Angelica
- Santa Maria in Traspontina
  - Oratorio della Dottrina Cristiana
- San Michele Arcangelo ai Corridori di Borgo
- Santi Michele e Magno
- Santa Monica degli Agostiniani
- San Pietro in Borgo
- Santo Spirito in Sassia
- Santo Stefano degli Ungheresi

=== R. XV Esquilino ===
- Sant'Alfonso di Liguori all'Esquilino
- Sant'Andrea Catabarbara
- Sant'Antonio Abate all'Esquilino
- Sant'Antonio da Padova in Via Merulana
- San Barnaba de Porta
- Santa Bibiana
- Santa Croce in Gerusalemme
- Cappella di Sant'Elena
- Sant'Eusebio
- San Giuliano all'Esquilino
- Oratorio di Santa Margherita
- Santa Margherita Maria Alacoque
- Cappella di Santa Maria Addolorata all'Esquilino
- Santa Maria del Buon Aiuto nell'Anfiteatro Castrense
- Oratorio di Santa Maria Immacolata della Concezione
- Santa Maria Immacolata all'Esquilino
- Santa Maria Maggiore
- Cappella della Sacra Famiglia di Nazareth all'Esquilino
- Santi Vito e Modesto

=== R. XVI Ludovisi ===
- Christuskirche
- Chiesa del Corpus Christi
- Chiesa di San Giuseppe Calasanzio
- Sant'Isidoro a Capo le Case
- Chiesa di San Lorenzo da Brindisi
- Santa Maria Regina dei Cuori
- Santa Maria della Concezione dei Cappuccini
- San Marone
- San Patrizio
- Santissimo Redentore e Santa Francesca Saverio Cabrini

=== R. XVII Sallustiano ===
- Chiesa del Sacro Cuore di Gesù
- San Camillo de Lellis
- Santa Maria della Vittoria

=== R. XVIII Castro Pretorio ===
- San Bernardo alle Terme
- San Caio
- Santa Ceterina ad Thermis
- San Ciriaco alle Terme Diocleziane
- Sacro Cuore di Gesù a Castro Pretorio
- Santissima Incarnazione del Verbo Divino
- Sant'Isidoro alle Terme
- Santa Maria degli Angeli e dei Martiri
- Chiesa evangelica metodista in Castro Pretorio
- San Norberto all'Esquilino
- San Paolo dentro le mura
- Santissimo Rosario di Pompei
- Sacra Famiglia a via Sommacampagna
- Santa Teresa alle Quattro Fontane

=== R. XIX Celio ===
- Oratorio di Sant'Andrea al Celio
- San Cesareo de Appia
- Santi Giovanni e Paolo al Celio
- San Giovanni a Porta Latina
- San Giovanni in Oleo
- San Gregorio Magno al Celio
- Santa Maria Imperatrice
- Santa Maria della Pietà al Colosseo
- Santa Maria in Tempulo
- Santa Maria in Domnica
- Santi Quattro Coronati
  - Oratorio di Santa Barbara
  - Oratorio di San Silvestro
- Oratorio dei Sette Dormienti
- Oratorio di Santa Silvia al Celio
- San Sisto Vecchio
- San Tommaso in Formis

=== R. XX Testaccio ===
- Chapel of the Protestant Cemetery
- Santa Maria della Divina Provvidenza a Testaccio
- Santa Maria Liberatrice a Monte Testaccio

=== R. XXI San Saba ===
- Santa Balbina
- Cappella di Santa Maria dell'Arco in un Torrione
- Santi Nereo e Achilleo
- San Saba

=== R. XXII Prati ===
- Beata Vergine Maria del Carmine
- Sacro Cuore del Suffragio
- San Gioacchino ai Prati di Castello
- San Giuseppe ai Prati
- Santa Maria Assunta delle Suore di San Giovanni Battista
- Santa Maria del Rosario in Prati
- Cappella di Santa Maria Immacolata dell'Istituto Scolastico Nazareth
- Tempio valdese di piazza Cavour

== Churches by quartieri ==
=== Q. I Flaminio ===
- Oratorio di Sant'Andrea a Ponte Milvio
- Sant'Andrea in Via Flaminia
- Santa Croce in Via Flaminia

=== Q. II Parioli ===
- Chiesa di San Luigi Gonzaga
- San Roberto Bellarmino
- Chiesa di San Valentino

=== Q. III Pinciano ===
- Sacro Cuore di Maria
- Sant'Eugenio
- Chiesa della Madonna dell'Arco Oscuro
- Santa Maria Immacolata a Villa Borghese
- Santa Maria della Pace ai Parioli
- Santa Teresa
- Santa Teresa del Bambin Gesù in Panfilo

=== Q. IV Salario ===
- Santa Maria della Mercede e Sant'Adriano a Villa Albani

=== Q. V Nomentano ===
- Sant'Angela Merici
- Chiesa del Corpus Domini
- Santa Francesca Cabrini
- San Giuseppe a via Nomentana
- Sant'Ippolito
- Nostra Signora del Santissimo Sacramento e Santi Martiri Canadesi
- Sant'Orsola
- Santi Sette Fondatori

=== Q. VI Tiburtino ===
- Chiesa della Divina Sapienza
- San Lorenzo fuori le mura
- Immacolata al Tiburtino
- Santa Maria Consolatrice al Tiburtino
- San Tommaso Moro

=== Q. VII Prenestino-Labicano ===
- Chiesa di San Barnaba
- Sant'Elena
- San Gerardo Maiella
- San Leone I
- San Luca Evangelista
- Santi Marcellino e Pietro ad Duas Lauros
- Santa Maria Madre della Misericordia
- Santissimo Sacramento a Tor de' Schiavi

=== Q. VIII Tuscolano ===
- Sant'Antonio da Padova in Via Tuscolana
- Chiesa dell'Assunzione di Maria
- Santissimo Corpo e Sangue di Cristo
- Santi Fabiano e Venanzio a Villa Fiorelli
- San Gaspare del Bufalo
- Santa Giulia Billiart
- Chiesa di San Giuseppe Cafasso
- Santa Maria Immacolata e San Giuseppe Benedetto Labre
- Santa Maria Ausiliatrice
- Santa Maria del Buon Consiglio
- Santo Stefano protomartire

=== Q. IX Appio-Latino ===
- Sant'Antonio di Padova a Circonvallazione Appia
- Santa Maria in Palmis
- San Giovanni Battista de' Rossi
- San Giuda Taddeo Apostolo
- Natività di Nostro Signore Gesù Cristo a Via Gallia
- Santissimo Nome di Maria in Via Latina
- Ognissanti
- Chiesa del Preziosissimo Sangue di Nostro Signore Gesù Cristo

=== Q. X Ostiense ===
- San Benedetto fuori Porta San Paolo
- San Filippo Neri in Eurosia
- San Francesco Saverio alla Garbatella
- Santa Galla
- Santi Isidoro e Eurosia
- San Leonardo Murialdo
- Santa Marcella
- Santa Maria Regina degli Apostoli alla Montagnola
- San Paolo fuori le mura
- San Salvatore de Porta

=== Q. XI Portuense ===
- Santi Aquila e Priscilla
- Chiesa della Sacra Famiglia
- Gesù Divin Lavoratore
- San Gregorio Magno alla Magliana Nuova
- Santa Passera
- Chiesa di Nostra Signora di Valme
- Santa Silvia
- Santo Volto di Gesù

=== Q. XII Gianicolense ===
- San Damaso
- Santi Francesco e Caterina Patroni d'Italia
- Cappella di Santa Giuliana Falconieri
- Chiesa di San Giulio
- Santa Maria del Carmine e San Giuseppe al Casaletto
- Santa Maria Madre della Provvidenza
- Santa Maria Regina Pacis a Monte Verde
- Nostra Signora di Coromoto
- San Pancrazio
- Cappella del Preziosissimo Sangue
- Nostra Signora de La Salette
- Trasfigurazione di Nostro Signore Gesù Cristo

=== Q. XIII Aurelio ===
- Chiesa di Sant'Ambrogio
- Santa Caterina Martire
- San Giuseppe Cottolengo
- San Gregorio VII
- Chiesa di San Leone Magno
- Santa Maria del Riposo
- Santa Maria delle Grazie alle Fornaci fuori Porta Cavalleggeri
- Santa Maria Immacolata di Lourdes a Boccea
- Santa Maria Mediatrice
- San Pio V a Villa Carpegna
- Santi Protomartiri a Via Aurelia Antica

=== Q. XIV Trionfale ===
- Gesù Divin Maestro alla Pineta Sacchetti
- San Giovanni Battista degli Spinelli
- San Giuseppe al Trionfale
- Cappella di Santa Maria degli Angeli
- Santa Maria delle Grazie a Via Trionfale
- Santa Paola Romana
- San Pio X alla Balduina

=== Q. XV Della Vittoria ===
- Santa Chiara a Vigna Clara
- Sacro Cuore di Cristo Re
- Santa Giovanna Antida Thouret delle Suore della Carità
- San Lazzaro dei lebbrosi
- Santa Lucia a Piazza d'Armi
- Madonna del Rosario
- Gran Madre di Dio
- Santa Maria Regina Apostolorum

=== Q. XVI Monte Sacro ===
- Santi Angeli Custodi a Città Giardino
- Chiesa di San Clemente
- Santa Gemma Galgani a Monte Sacro
- Santa Maria Assunta al Tufello
- Santissimo Redentore a Valmelaina

=== Q. XVII Trieste ===
- Sant'Agnese fuori le mura
  - Santa Costanza
- Sacri Cuori di Gesù e Maria a Tor Fiorenza
- Santa Emerenziana a Tor Fiorenza
- San Giuda Taddeo
- Santa Maria Addolorata a piazza Buenos Aires
- Santa Maria Goretti
- San Saturnino
- Santissima Trinità a Villa Chigi

=== Q. XVIII Tor di Quinto ===
- Preziosissimo Sangue di Nostro Signore Gesù Cristo

=== Q. XIX Prenestino-Centocelle ===
- San Bernardo di Chiaravalle
- Sacra Famiglia di Nazareth a Centocelle
- San Felice da Cantalice a Centocelle
- Sant'Ireneo a Centocelle

=== Q. XX Ardeatino ===
- Santissima Annunziata a Via Ardeatina
- Chiesa dell'Annunziatella
- Gesù Buon Pastore alla Montagnola
- San Josemaría Escrivá
- Santa Maria Scala Coeli
- San Nicola a Capo di Bove
- Chiesa di Nostra Signora di Lourdes a Tor Marancia
- San Paolo alle Tre Fontane
- San Sebastiano fuori le mura
- Tre Fontane Abbey
  - Santa Maria Scala Coeli
  - San Paolo alle Tre Fontane
  - Santi Vincenzo e Anastasio alle Tre Fontane
- Sant'Urbano alla Caffarella

=== Q. XXI Pietralata ===
- Sant'Atanasio a Via Tiburtina
- San Fedele da Sigmaringa
- San Michele Arcangelo a Pietralata
- San Romano Martire

=== Q. XXII Collatino ===
- Chiesa di Sant'Agapito
- Chiesa di Gesù di Nazareth
- San Giovanni Battista in Collatino
- San Giuseppe Artigiano
- Santa Maria Addolorata
- Santa Maria del Soccorso, Rome
- Chiesa di Santa Maria della Visitazione

=== Q. XXIII Alessandrino ===
- Chiesa dell'Ascensione di Nostro Signore Gesù Cristo
- Jubilee Church
- San Francesco di Sales
- Chiesa di San Giustino
- San Tommaso d'Aquino

=== Q. XXIV Don Bosco ===
- San Bonaventura da Bagnoregio
- San Gabriele dell'Addolorata
- San Giovanni Bosco
- Santa Maria Domenica Mazzarello
- Santa Maria Regina Mundi a Torre Spaccata
- San Stanislao

=== Q. XXV Appio Claudio ===
- Chiesa di Santa Barbara
- Sant'Ignazio d'Antiochia
- San Policarpo all'Acquedotto Claudio

=== Q. XXVI Appio-Pignatelli ===
- San Tarcisio

=== Q. XXVII Primavalle ===
- Chiesa di San Cipriano
- San Filippo Neri alla Pineta Sacchetti
- San Giuseppe all'Aurelio
- San Lino
- San Luigi Maria Grignion de Montfort
- Santa Maria Assunta e San Giuseppe a Primavalle
- Chiesa di Santa Maria della Salute

=== Q. XXVIII Monte Sacro Alto ===
- Chiesa di Sant'Achille
- Chiesa di San Giovanni Crisostomo
- San Mattia
- San Ponziano

=== Q. XXIX Ponte Mammolo ===
- Chiesa del Sacro Cuore di Gesù a Ponte Mammolo
- Chiesa di San Gelasio I papa
- San Liborio
- Chiesa di Santa Maria Maddalena de' Pazzi

=== Q. XXX San Basilio ===
- Chiesa di San Basilio
- Chiesa di San Cleto

=== Q. XXXI Giuliano-Dalmata ===
- San Giuseppe da Copertino
- San Marco Evangelista in Agro Laurentino

=== Q. XXXII Europa ===
- San Gregorio Barbarigo
- Santi Pietro e Paolo a Via Ostiense

=== Q. XXXIII Lido di Ostia Ponente ===
- Santa Monica di Ostia
- Chiesa di Nostra Signora di Bonaria

=== Q. XXXIV Lido di Ostia Levante ===
- Santa Maria Regina Pacis a Ostia Lido

=== Q. XXXV Lido di Castel Fusano ===
- None

== Churches in the suburban zones ==
- Sant'Andrea apostolo in Castel di Decima
- Oratorio di Sant'Andrea Apostolico
- Sant'Andrea Avellino
- Santa Aurea
- Chiesa di San Bernardino da Siena
- Chiesa di San Bruno
- Cattedrale dei Sacri Cuori di Gesù e Maria
- Santa Chiara a Villa York
- San Cirillo Alessandrino
- San Melchiade
- Santi Cirillo e Metodio
- San Corbiniano
- San Crispino da Viterbo
- Sacro Cuore di Gesù agonizzante a Vitinia
- San Domenico di Guzmán
- Sant'Edith Stein
- Sant'Eligio
- San Francesco a Monte Mario
- San Frumenzio ai Prati Fiscali
- Chiesa di San Gabriele Arcangelo
- Santa Gemma Galgani
- Gesù Divin Salvatore
- Santi Gioacchino e Anna al Tuscolano
- Cappella di San Giovanni Battista
- San Giovanni Battista de La Salle al Torrino
- San Giovanni Maria Vianney
- San Girolamo a Corviale
- San Girolamo Emiliani
- San Giuliano Martire
- San Giuseppe Moscati
- San Leonardo da Porto Maurizio ad Acilia
- Santa Maria Causa Nostrae Laetitiae
- Chiesa di Santa Maria del Carmelo
- Santa Maria della Consolazione a Tor de' Cenci
- Santa Maria della Speranza
- Santa Maria Immacolata a Grottarossa
- Santa Maria Immacolata alla Cervelletta
- Santa Maria in Celsano
- Santa Maria Madre del Redentore a Tor Bella Monaca
- Santa Maria Mater Ecclesiae
- Santa Maria del Rosario di Pompei alla Magliana
- Santi Mario e Compagni Martiri
- Chiesa di San Matteo
- San Mauro abate
- Santa Melania juniore
- Chiesa di San Nicola di Bari
- Chiesa di Nostra Signora di Czestochowa
- Santuario di Nostra Signora di Fatima a San Vittorino
- Nostra Signora di Guadalupe a Monte Mario
- Nostra Signora di Guadalupe e San Filippo Martire
- Chiesa di San Pancrazio
- San Paolo della Croce a Corviale
- San Pier Damiani ai Monti di San Paolo
- San Pio da Pietrelcina
- Chiesa di San Raffaele Arcangelo
- San Rocco a Malagrotta
- Santa Rosa da Viterbo
- San Vincenzo de' Paoli
- Santi Simone e Giuda Taddeo a Torre Angela
- San Timoteo
- Chiesa di San Tommaso Apostolo
- Sant'Ugo
- Santi Urbano e Lorenzo

== Churches in Vatican City ==
- Sant'Ambrogio in Vaticano
- Sant'Anna dei Palafrenieri
- Sant'Egidio in Borgo
- Santa Maria della Febbre
- Santa Maria Regina della Famiglia
- Santa Maria in Turri
- Santa Marta in Vaticano
- Santi Martino e Sebastiano degli Svizzeri
- San Pellegrino in Vaticano
- San Pietro in Vaticano
- Santo Stefano degli Abissini

== See also ==
- Architecture of Rome
- Early Christianity
- Religion in Rome
