= Gabriele Valvassori =

Italian architect

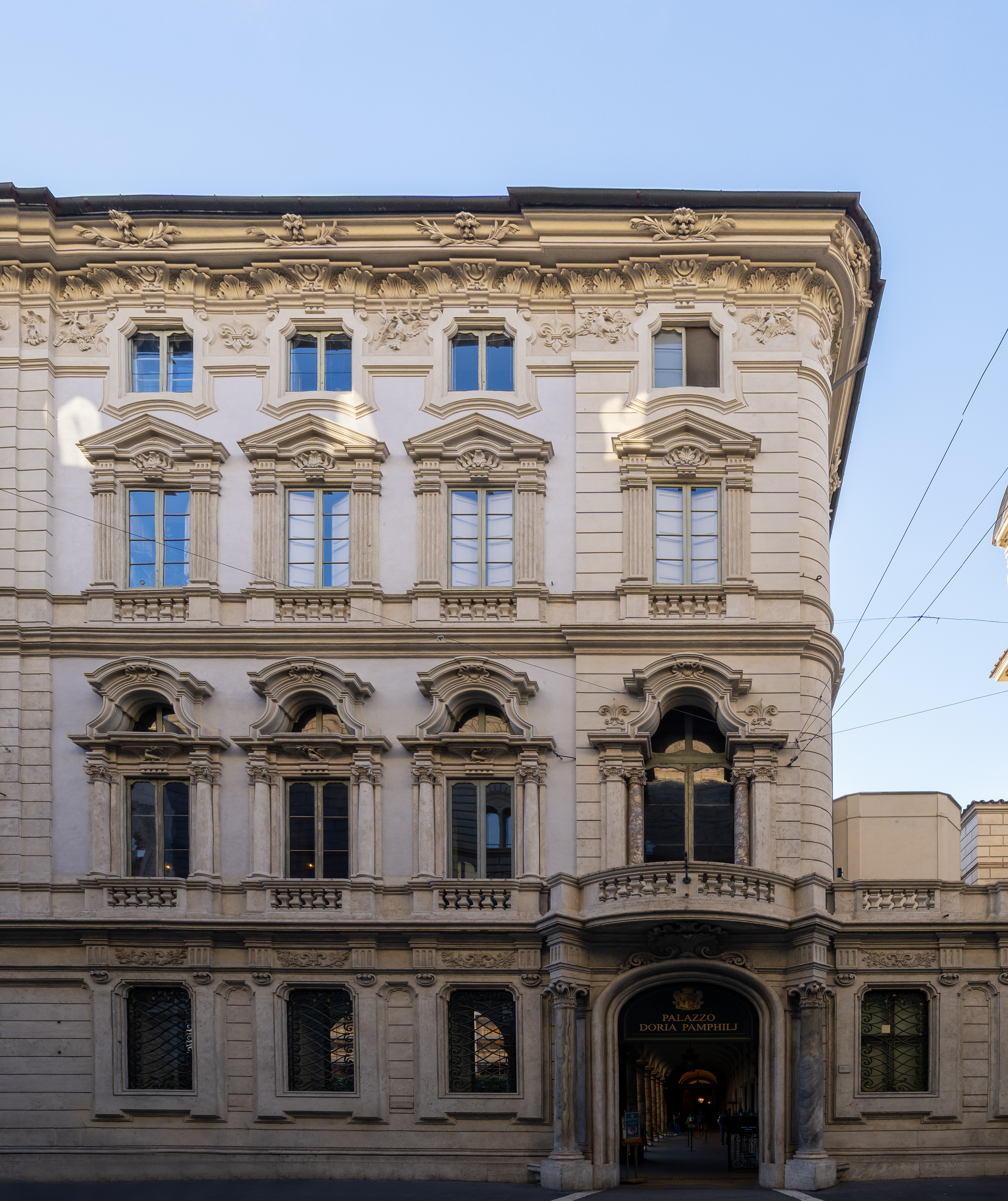
- Palazzo Doria Pamphilj, facade facing the via del Corso
- Born: 21 August 1683; Rome, Papal States
- Died: 7 April 1761 (aged 77); Rome, Papal States
- Education: Accademia di San Luca
- Known for: architecture
- Movement: Baroque

Gabriele Valvassori (21 August 1683 – 7 April 1761) was an Italian architect of the late-Baroque period, mainly active in his native city of Rome.

== Biography ==
Gabriele Valvassori was born in Rome on 21 August 1683 to Benedetto, a carpenter from Bergamo, and Adriana Francesca Bendatti. He trained at the Accademia di San Luca, Rome, and first worked as a draughtsman and engraver for such architectural publications as the third volume of the Studio di architettura civile (1721), published by Domenico de' Rossi. His first documented work as an architect was assisting Filippo Barigioni with the expansion of the thermal baths in Bagni, Nocera Umbra (begun 1713). In 1715 he was commissioned to design the small church of San Giuseppe alle Fornaci in Foligno, where he made use of Rococo ornamentation.

In 1717 Valvassori entered the service of the Pamphili family, first as an assistant to Carlo Bizzaccheri, under whom he designed unusually decorative railings for the Villa Pamphili, becoming architect to the Pamphili in 1720. In 1723 he built the high altar of the church of Sant'Agnese in Agone, Rome, for Cardinal Benedetto Pamphili. In 1732 Valvassori executed the garden portals, outer walls and fountains for the Villa Doria Pamphili in Rome. He also remodelled the courtyard front (1731–5) of the Palazzo Doria-Pamphili in Rome, closing off the upper loggias and turning them into galleries. Their decoration is among the finest Roman interior ornamentation of its time. He rebuilt the 17-bay main façade on the Via del Corso, enlivening it with a battery of close-set windows embellished with Rococo pediments, while projecting portals and balconies introduced elements of controlled movement.

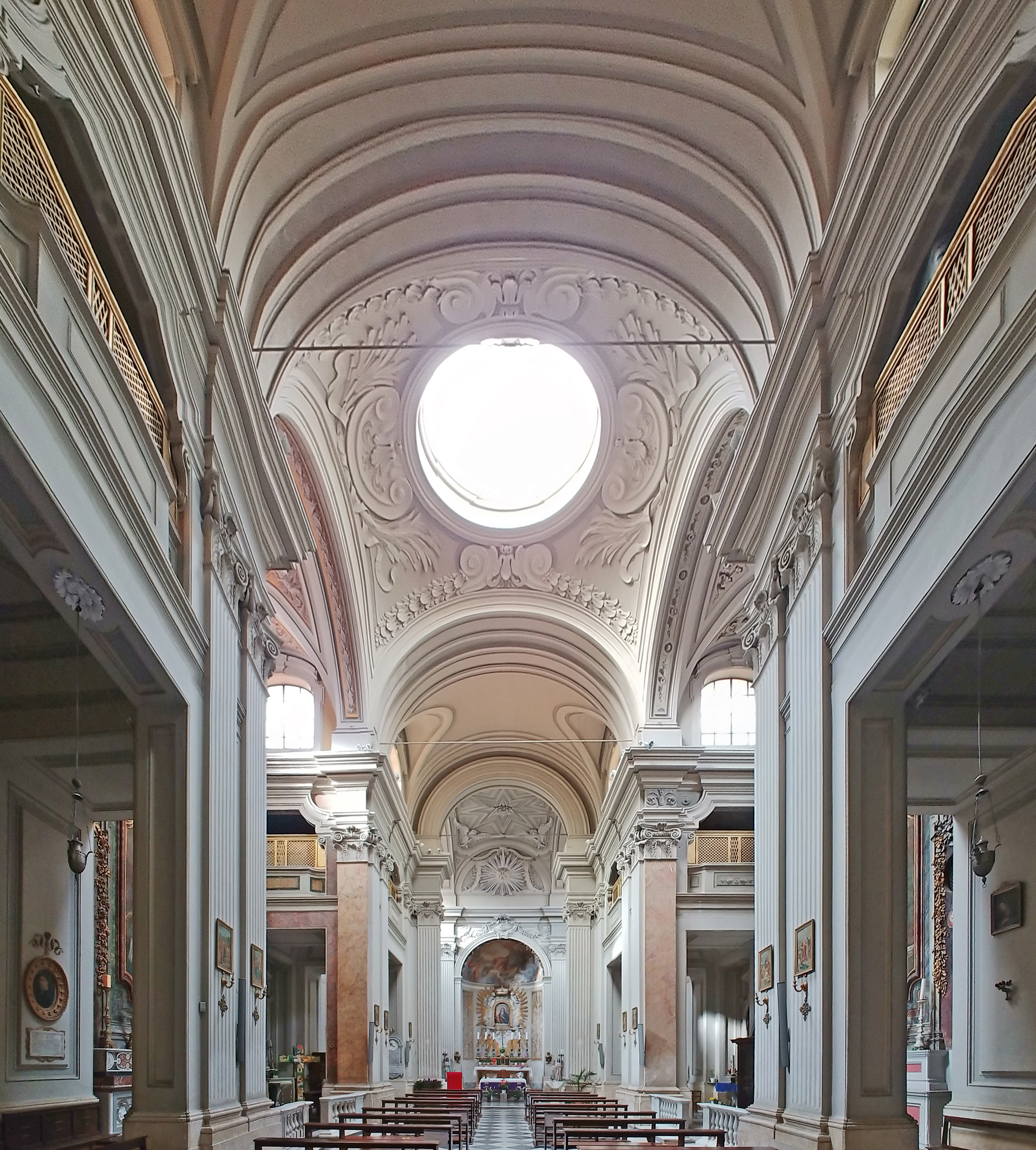
Interior of Santa Maria della Luce, Rome

Valvassori’s link with the Pamphili family was broken off in 1739, for unknown reasons. His other commissions included festival decorations for the ‘Chinea’ for Prince Colonna (1729–30) at the Palazzo Colonna, Rome, and about 1730 he designed the new building of the Roman church of Santa Maria della Luce. It has an idiosyncratic ground-plan with two pairs of transepts, probably dictated by the layout of the previous building, which give rise to an unusual rhythmic sequence of lower and higher volumetries and changed lighting effects. In 1731 he built the Collegio Cerasoli on the Piazza di Pietra for the Bergamasques living in Rome, although his designs for their church of Santi Bartolomeo ed Alessandro dei Bergamaschi, in a style showing the influence of Filippo Juvarra, were never carried out.

Between 1747 and 1750 Valvassori designed the chapel of San Giovanni Battista in Santa Maria dell'Orto. His last known work was the new building (1750–53) for the convent of Santi Quirico e Giulitta. Despite his slender output, Valvassori is one of the finest architects of the Roman Rococo, surpassed only by Juvarra, from whom he seems to have learnt much. In a similar way to Juvarra, Valvassori experimented with the interpenetration of the wall and cupola zones in church architecture and with the largest possible openings in the wall zones (Rome, Palazzo Doria-Pamphili and projects for Santi Bartolomeo e Alessandro). Valvassori was elected an accademico di merito (1737) of the Accademia di San Luca and rose to be reggente of the Accademia dei Virtuosi al Pantheon. With sparse means he gave elegance even to such simple buildings as colleges and convents. By the time of his death, however, the Roman Rococo style that he had represented with talent and creativity had already fallen into disrepute.

== Works ==
- Church of San Giuseppe alle Fornaci, Foligno (1715–1718)
- Main Altar of Sant'Agnese in Agone, Rome (1720)
- Minor contributions to Villa Aldobrandini, Frascati (1723–1729)
- Cerasoli College (still part of the Pontifical Roman Major Seminary, Rome (1729–1735)
- Palazzo Doria-Pamphili, Rome (1730–1735, façade, courtyard, gardens, and hall of mirrors)
- Santa Maria della Luce, Rome (1730, renovation)
- Santa Maria dell'Orto, Rome (1750, Chapel of San Giovanni Battista)
- Church of Santi Quirico e Giulitta, Rome (1750–1753, renovation, sacristy)

== Bibliography ==
- Roca De Amicis, Augusto (2020). "VALVASSORI, Gabriele". Dizionario Biografico degli Italiani (in Italian). Vol. 98: Valeriani–Verra. Rome: Institute of the Italian Encyclopaedia. ISBN 978-88-12-00032-6.
