= Port of Ripa Grande and Papal Arsenal =

Coordinates: 41.8844°N 12.4766°E

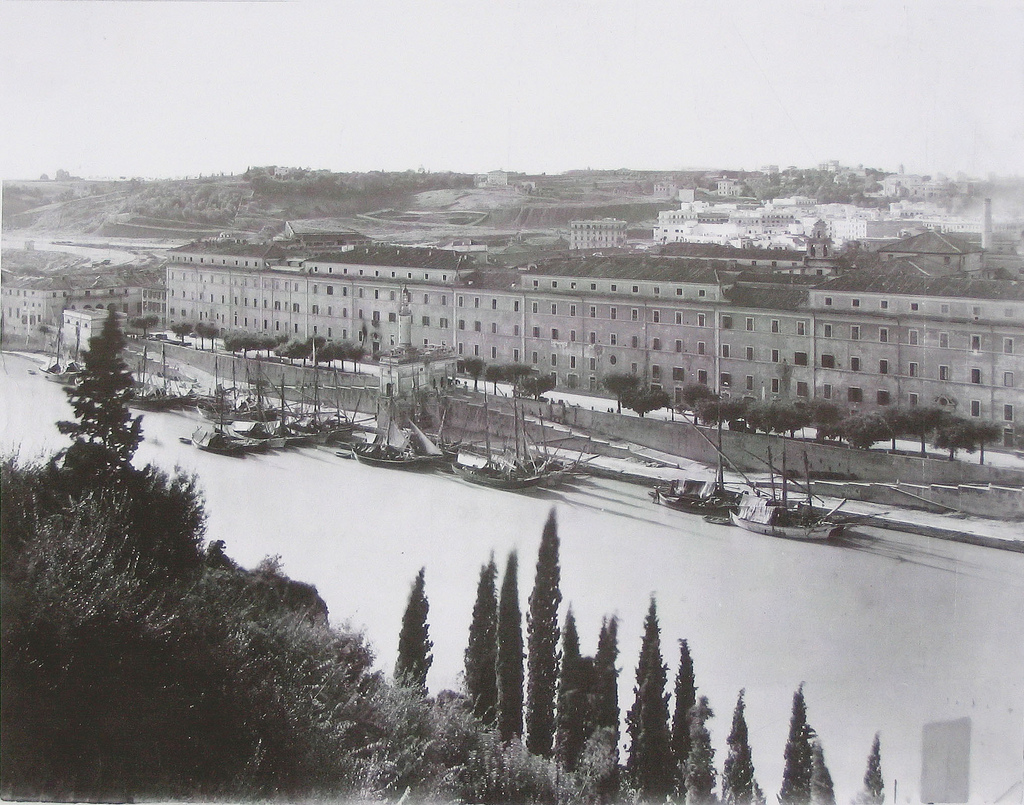
Photograph of the port (taken before 1876)

Porto di Ripa Grande was the river port of Rome, just downstream the former Pons Sublicius, where the wares, going up and down the Tiber towards the dock of Fiumicino, were handled. The building of the muraglioni (massive walls) has erased its existence and function, just keeping a trace in the toponymy (the stretch of Lungotevere, that flanks San Michele a Ripa Grande, is called Porto di Ripa Grande, while Via del Porto is the narrow street that links the Tiber to Santa Cecilia in Trastevere and Santa Maria dell'Orto) and in the two ramps giving access to the quay of the river.

== The port ==
During the Roman era, the maritime harbour of Rome was Ostia. From there, the wares destined to the town were transported up the Tiber, along which several docks, with specific functions, were placed.

The general river emporium rose on the left bank of the river, starting from the present Rione Testaccio - where remains of the Porticus Aemilia and of the emporium are still visible - up to the slopes of the Aventine Hill, that for this reason was intensely populated during the Imperial era.

The port area never completely stopped its activity even in the last years of the Empire and during the Middle Ages, serving as a landing place both for pilgrims and wares. It therefore went on housing both structures for craftmanship (carpentry, boathouse, service buildings and so on) and military structures for the control of river traffic and fiscal collection.

The river port of Ripa Grande, that was the main dock on the Tiber, though much less monumental than the Port of Ripetta, was rebuilt in the 17th century opposite to the former Emporium, on the other bank of the Tiber and just a few upstream than the previous location, within Porta Portuense (that had been withdrawn as well).

== The arsenal ==
Factories for the building of military ships had existed around the Port of Ripa Grande until the 16th century, due to the wars against the Ottoman Empire. After the Battle of Lepanto in 1571, harbour activities acquired a more commercial character (i.e. ships maintenance and equipment, customs activities and alike).

Just outside Porta Portese, Pope Clement XI built the new papal arsenal, intended for the maintenance of the river boats, as well as the commercial papal ships. Its position just outside the excise city wall can be explained with the purpose to reduce the fiscal pressure on the materials used in maintenance activities.

The building, whose architect is unknown, was conceived as analogous to the arsenal of Civitavecchia, designed by Gian Lorenzo Bernini and completed by Domenico Fontana fifty years before; it was erected between 1714 and 1715, on a smaller scale than the former one, due to its more limited functions.

The structure went on working until the end of the 19th century when, after the building of the muraglioni (massive walls), all river-connected activities were given up. The two ramps, going down to the river under the complex of San Michele, became the only memory of the port.

Arsenal activities were connected to a network of services, like customs offices and barracks, as well of handicraft specialized productions (ropes, carpentry etc.), whose only present trace is the name of a trattoria close to the gate.

== Gallery ==
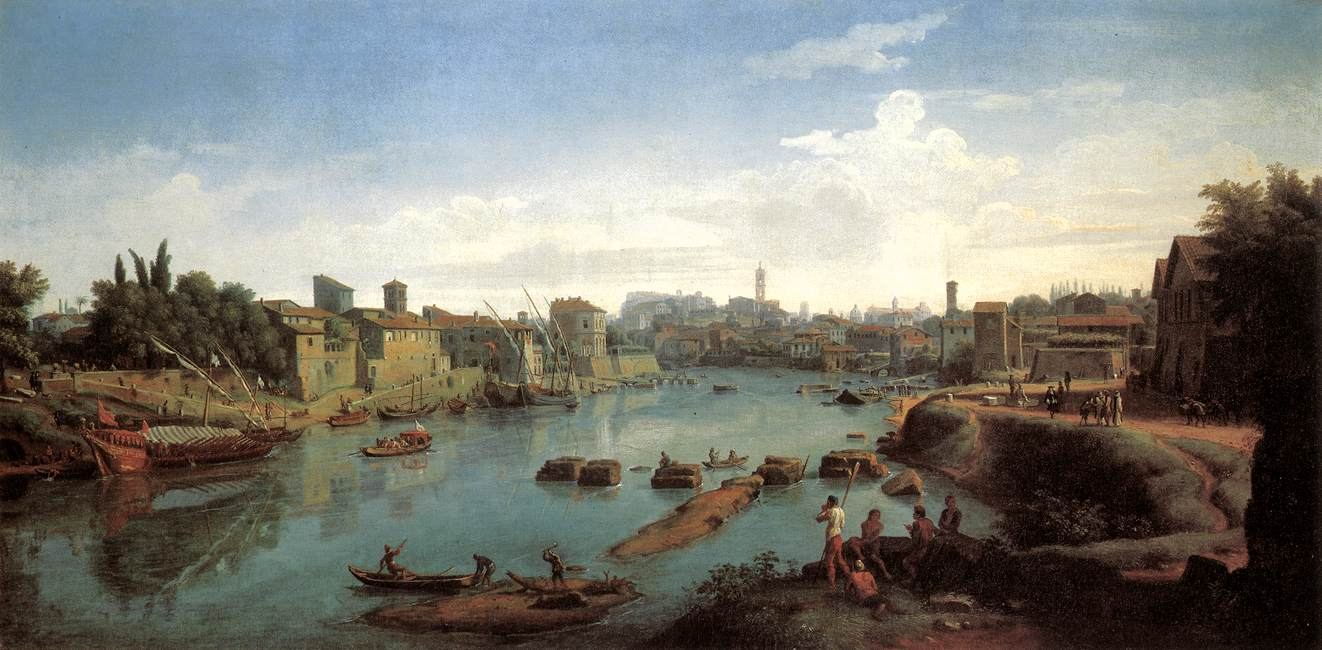
Rome, the Tiber near the Porto di Ripa Grande by Gaspar van Wittel (circa 1711)

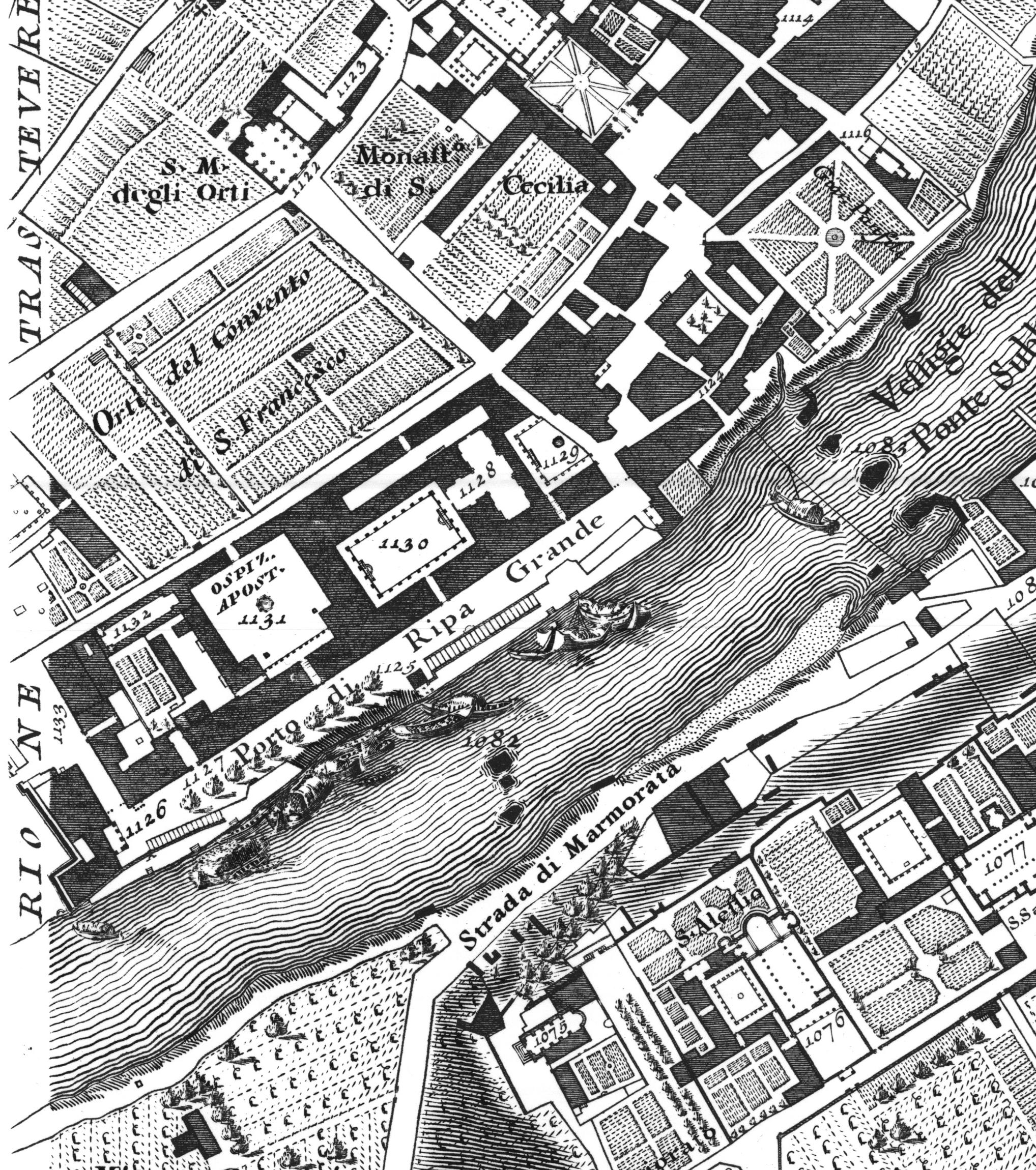
Detail from the Nuova Pianta di Roma by Giambattista Nolli (1748)

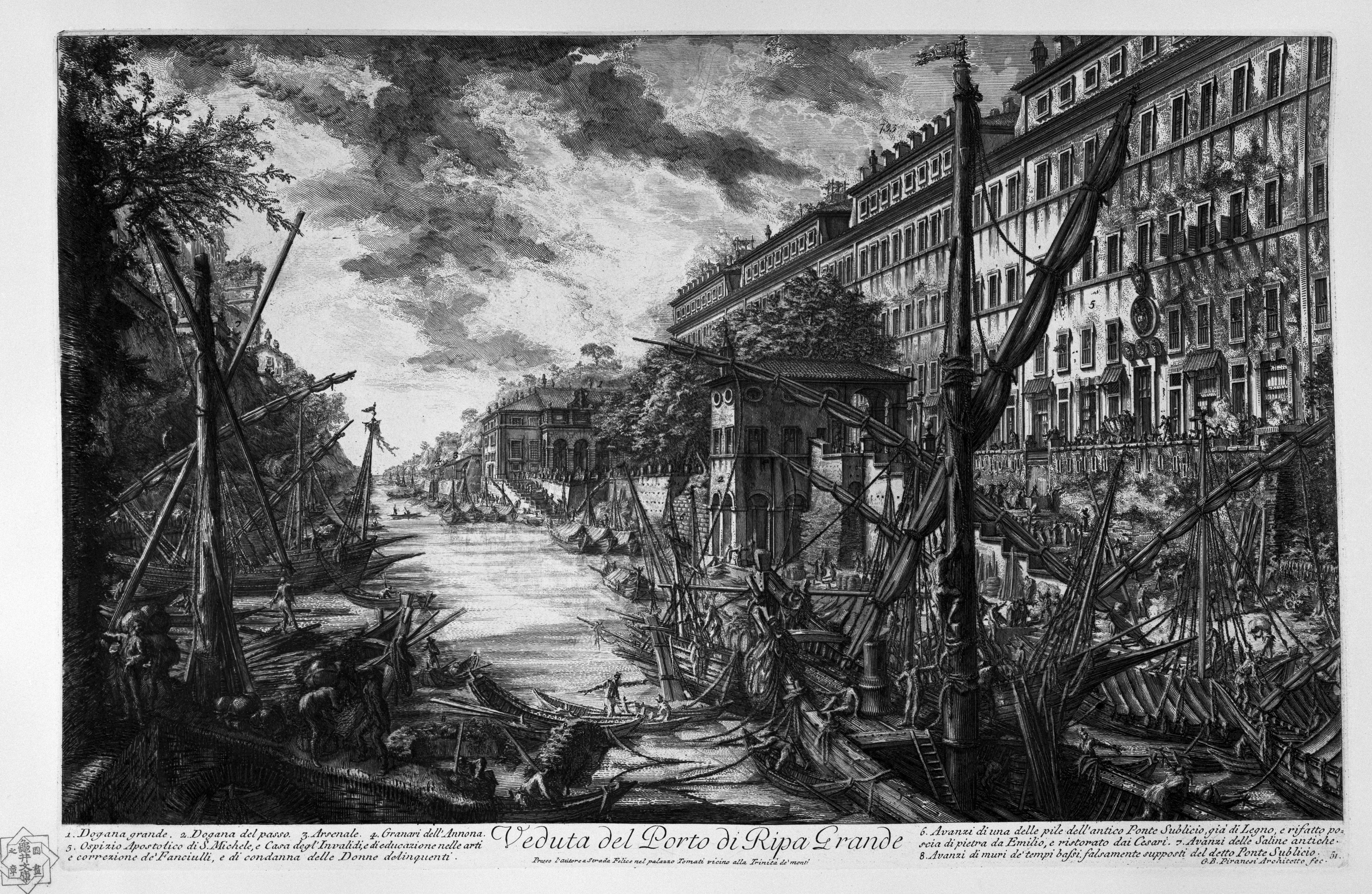
Engraving Giovanni Battista Piranesi (ca. 1750)

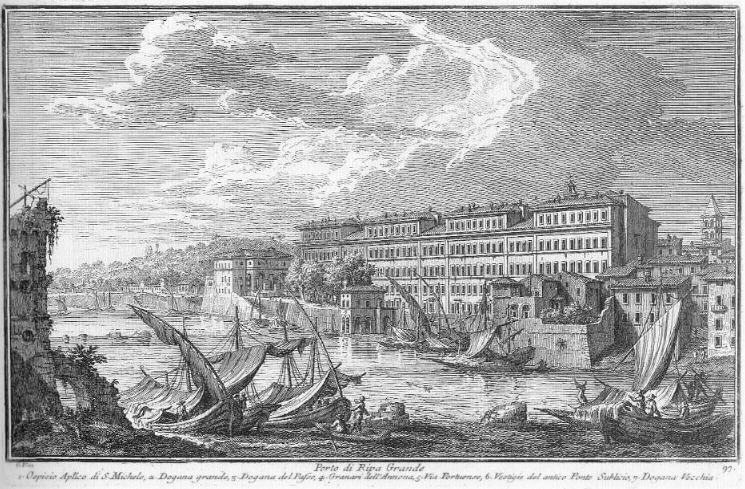
Engraving by Giuseppe Vasi (1754)

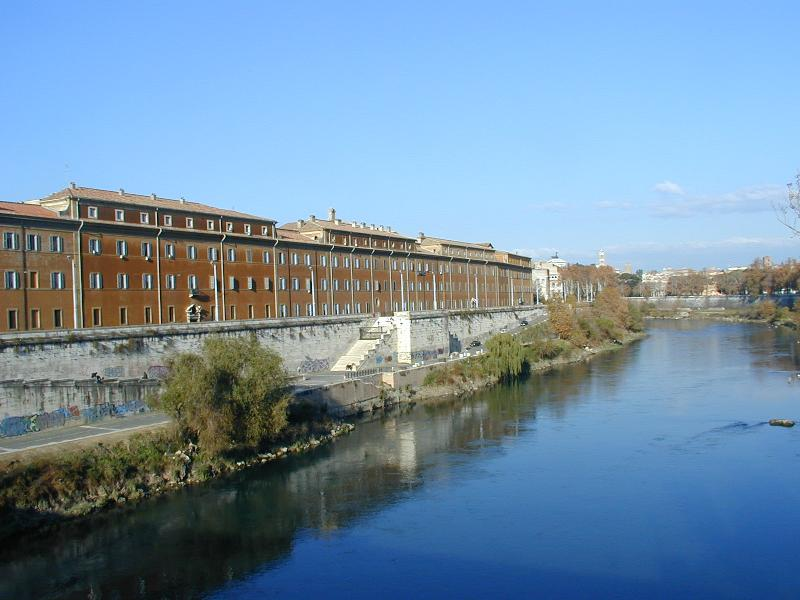
The ramps of Ripa Grande

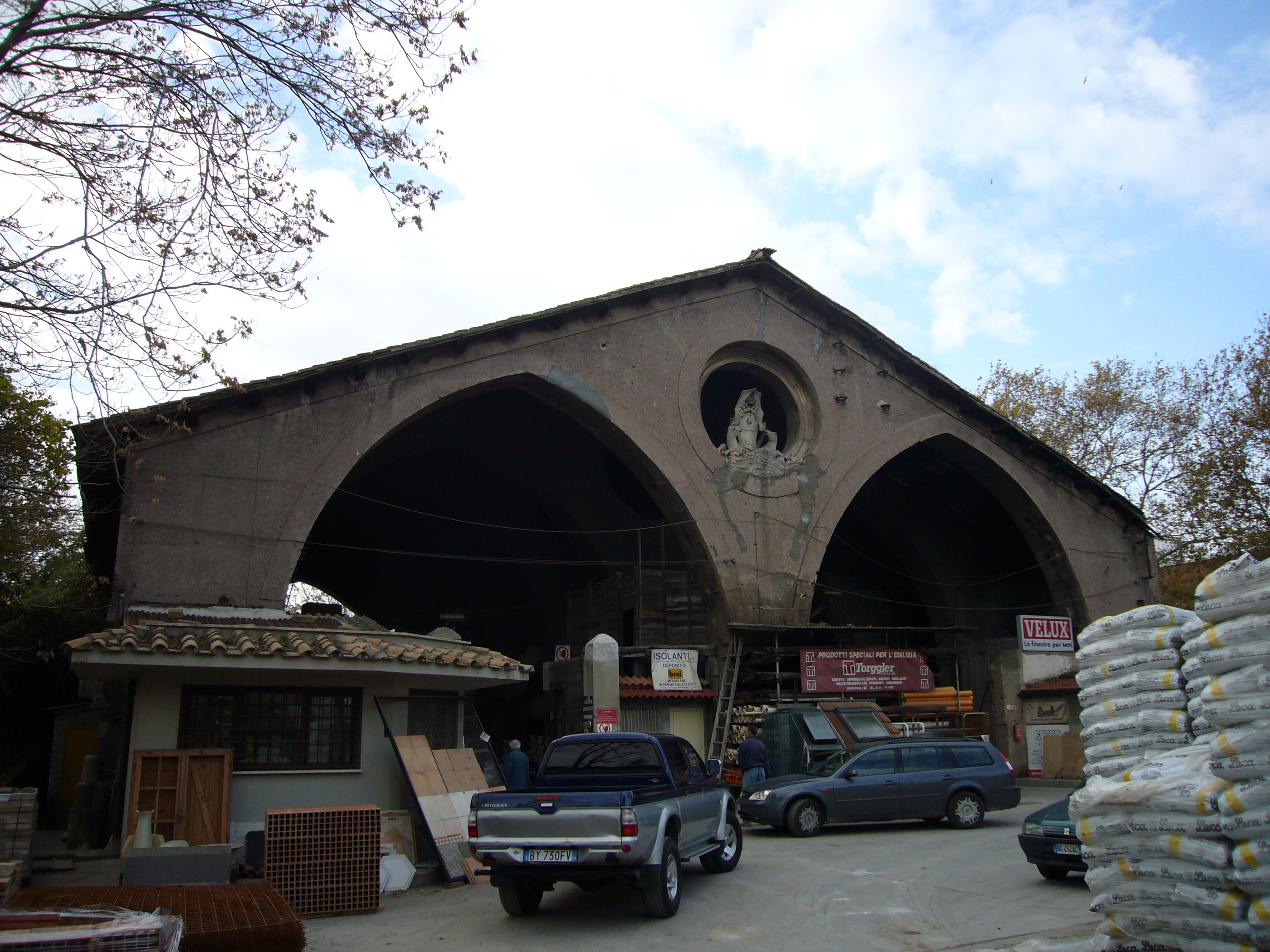
The arsenal

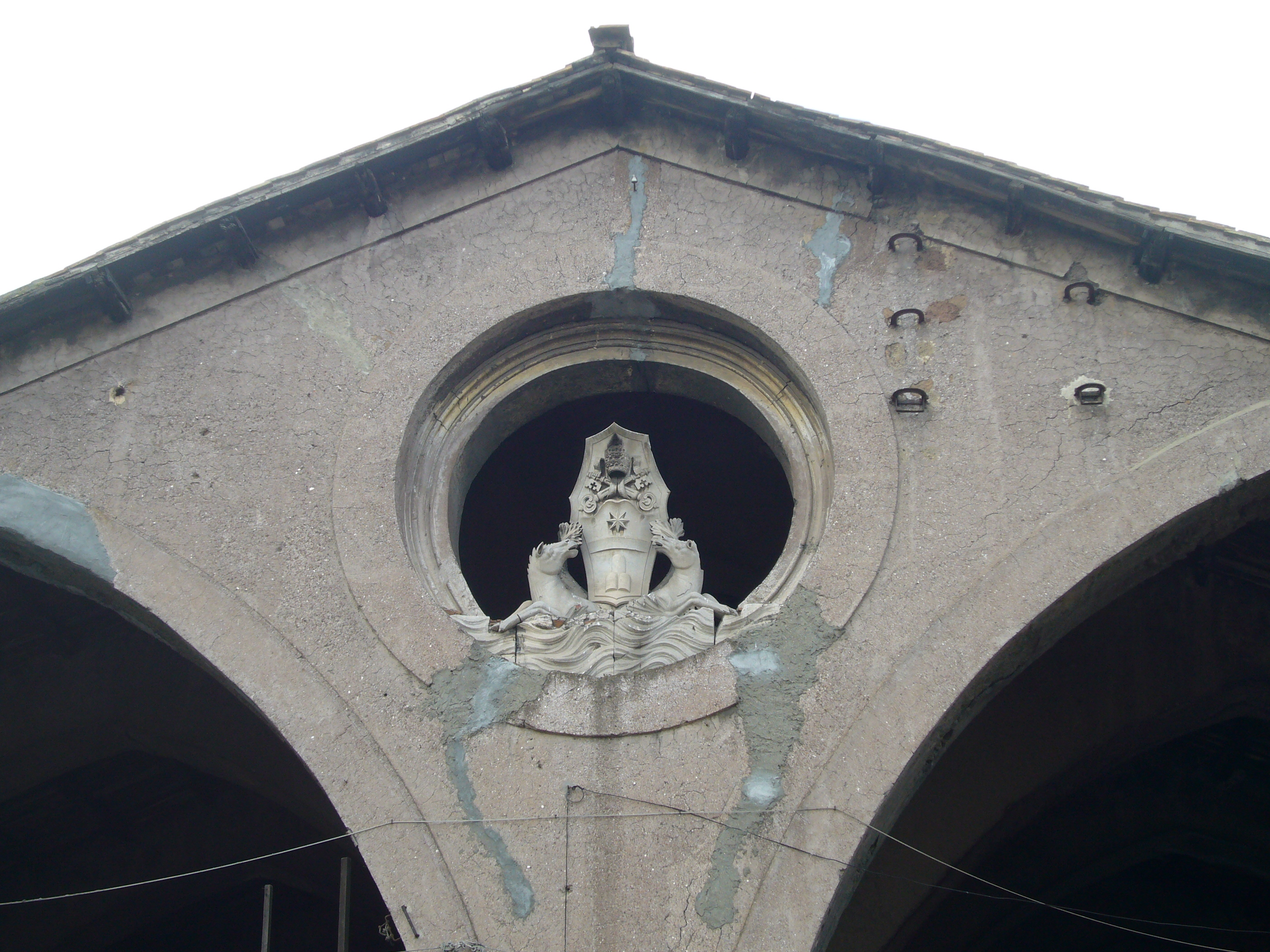
Detail with the coat of arms of Pope Clement XI

== See also ==
- Papal Navy

== Bibliography ==
- Emma Marconcini, L'arsenale pontificio a Ripa Grande, Fratelli Palombi Editori, 1991
