= Santa Maria del Divino Amore =

Church building in Rome, Italy

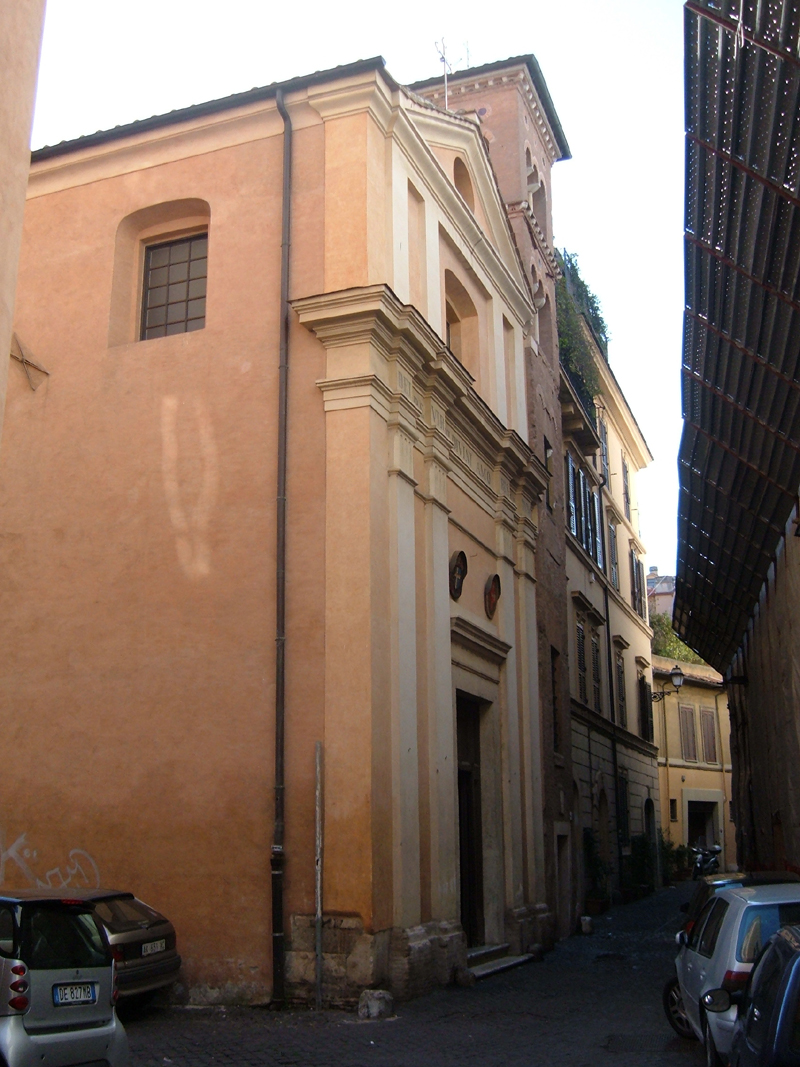
Campo Marzio - SS. Cecilia e Biagio

Santa Maria del Divino Amore is a church in Campo Marzio, Rome. It is also called Madonna del Divino Amore in Campo Marzio, Santa Cecilia De Puzerato, or Santi Cecilia e Biagio dei Materassari. The original church was consecrated in 1131 on the reputed site of Saint Cecilia's family home. In 1525 Pope Clement VII assigned it to the guild of mattress makers (materassari) who rededicated it to Saint Blaise (Biagio), their patron saint. The church was rebuilt in 1729 to a design by Filippo Raguzzini and rededicated to Cecilia. In 1802 Pope Pius VII transferred it to the Confraternity of Our Lady of Divine Love and it received its current dedication.
