= Alessandro Cialdi =

Italian engineer and navigator (1807–1882)

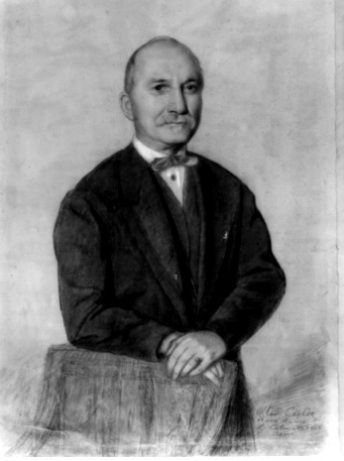
Alessandro Cialdi

Alessandro Cialdi (Civitavecchia, 9 April 1807 – Rome, 26 June 1882) was an Italian naval commander and engineer, and commander of the Papal navy. He took an active part in the First Italian War of Independence and in the government of Pellegrino Rossi. He was later President of the Accademia dei Lincei and corresponding member of the Institut de France.

== Early life ==
He was born to Luigi Cialdi, of Tuscan origin, and Plautilla Gandini, in a modest family of merchants. He undertook his early studies in his hometown before moving to the Nautical School in Genoa from 1828-31. He made two trips to America on Sardinian ships, with the Sardinian flag, first as a ship's clerk, then as captain of a merchant ship that sailed to Rio de Janeiro. In the late 1830s he was taken into the government service of the Papal States, initially as a pilot on the San Pietro while it patrolled the Mediterranean for cases of cholera that was causing many deaths in a Rome at the time. After this he led a mission on the La Madonna delle Grazie to convey 119 political prisoners to Bahia as part of a plan to establish a new colony in Brazil. Returning to Rome, he married Emilia, daughter of the engineer who was teaching him hydrology. She died just sixteen months after they were married.

== Pontifical navy ==
In September 1840, now promoted to captain in the Papal navy, Cialdi, was put in command of an expedition to Egypt to collect two alabaster obelisks that were a gift from Muhammad Ali and intended for the rebuilding of Basilica of Saint Paul Outside the Walls. When his ships arrived in Egypt however the obelisks were not ready for transport, so he obtained permission to journey up the Nile. His was the first European ship ever to reach the first cataract before he returned to Rosetta and brought the obelisks to Rome in 1841.

The following year he was sent to England to collect and deliver three small paddle-steamers purchased by the Papal States that were to be used to haul shipping up the Tiber to Rome - until then this had been done using oxen. Cialdi brought them through the canals of France to Marseille and then to Rome. This was the first time steamships had crossed France by canal; to get them through the 190 locks, the paddlewheels had to be removed and the ships hauled through by hand. Such was the devotion inspired by the sight of the papal flag in France’s remote villages that people held competitions for the honour of pulling on the ropes to bring them safely through. On his return to Rome Cialdi was placed in charge of the three new ships, bringing them into service.

== War ==
During the First Italian War of Independence, Cialdi was ordered to sail one of the paddle-steamers, renamed the Roma, to Ancona on the Adriatic, and then to join the Royal Sardinian Navy in its mission to defend against Austrian attacks. He was soon recalled however. The Roma remained in Ancona and later took part in the defence of that city. Cialdi himself was ordered by the provisional government in Rome to strengthen the defenses at Civitavecchia, and was given overall command of the Republic's fleet. (Note: Despite what some modern accounts say, he was not present at the siege of Ancona in 1859, when his old ship the Roma was actually under the command of Raffaele Castagnola.)

== Scientific contributions ==
Cialdi authored around fifty papers on nautical and hydrological studies. One of his more notable propositions was that there was a deficiency in existing wave theory, which held that ocean waves caused the molecules of water to oscillate in a roughly circular motion, but did not actually transport them continuously in the direction of the wave’s travel - waves were a superficial disturbance and the mass of water through which they moved did not move with them. Cialdi however maintained that near the coast, the impact of the molecules of the lower layers of water against the bottom produced a true movement of the mass of water, directed towards the shore and increasingly rapid as it approaches it. He called this phenomenon “fluttocorrente” (“indraught”). Although this proposition was widely discussed in learned societies at the time, the phenomenon Cialdi described does not in fact exist.

== Later life ==
After Pius IX was restored, all officials who had agreed to work for the Republican government were removed from office. Cialdi went to Florence where he remained for some six years, writing and taking part in hydrological studies to understand how the flow of the river Serchio. could be controlled. In 1856 he was invited back by the Pope to travel to England and deliver three new coastguard vessels that had been ordered. He was restored to the command of these ships and undertook a number of specialist nautical and hydrological studies for the pontifical government in the following years. When the Papal States were absorbed into the Kingdom of Italy in 1870, Cialdi remained in command of the single paddle-steamer, the Immacolata Concezione, retained for the Pope’s use, although he never in fact set foot on it. (Note: The lifeboat from the Immaculata Concezione is preserved at the Museo Nazionale Scienza e Tecnologia Leonardo da Vinci in Milan, and a small-scale model of the ship and its flag are preserved at the Vatican Historical Museum in the Lateran Palace.)

He retired shortly afterwards, declining the many offers of positions and roles offered to him, preferring to work privately on his scientific studies. In 1878 he became a corresponding member of the French Academy of Sciences and in 1879 he became President of the National Academy of the Lincei.

Upon his death in 1882, he left many of his writings to the Biblioteca Vallicelliana and to the Library of Civitavecchia, which adopted his name.

== Selected works ==
- Sopra le ultime disposizioni date ai lavori nel porto canale di Fiumicino (On the latest updates to the works in the Fiumicino canal port), Tipografia delle Belle Arti, Rome 1848
- Le dighe di Portosàido ed il loro insabbiamento sino al giorno della solenne apertura del Bosforo di Suez (The dykes of Port Said and their silting up until the day of the solemn opening of the Suez Canal), Tipografia delle Belle Arti, Rome 2869
- Sul moto ondoso del mare e su le correnti di esso specialmente su quelle littorali (On the wave motion of the sea and it currents, particularly coastal ones), Tipografia delle Belle Arti, Rome 1866
