= Santa Maria della Quercia, Rome =

Santa Maria della Quercia
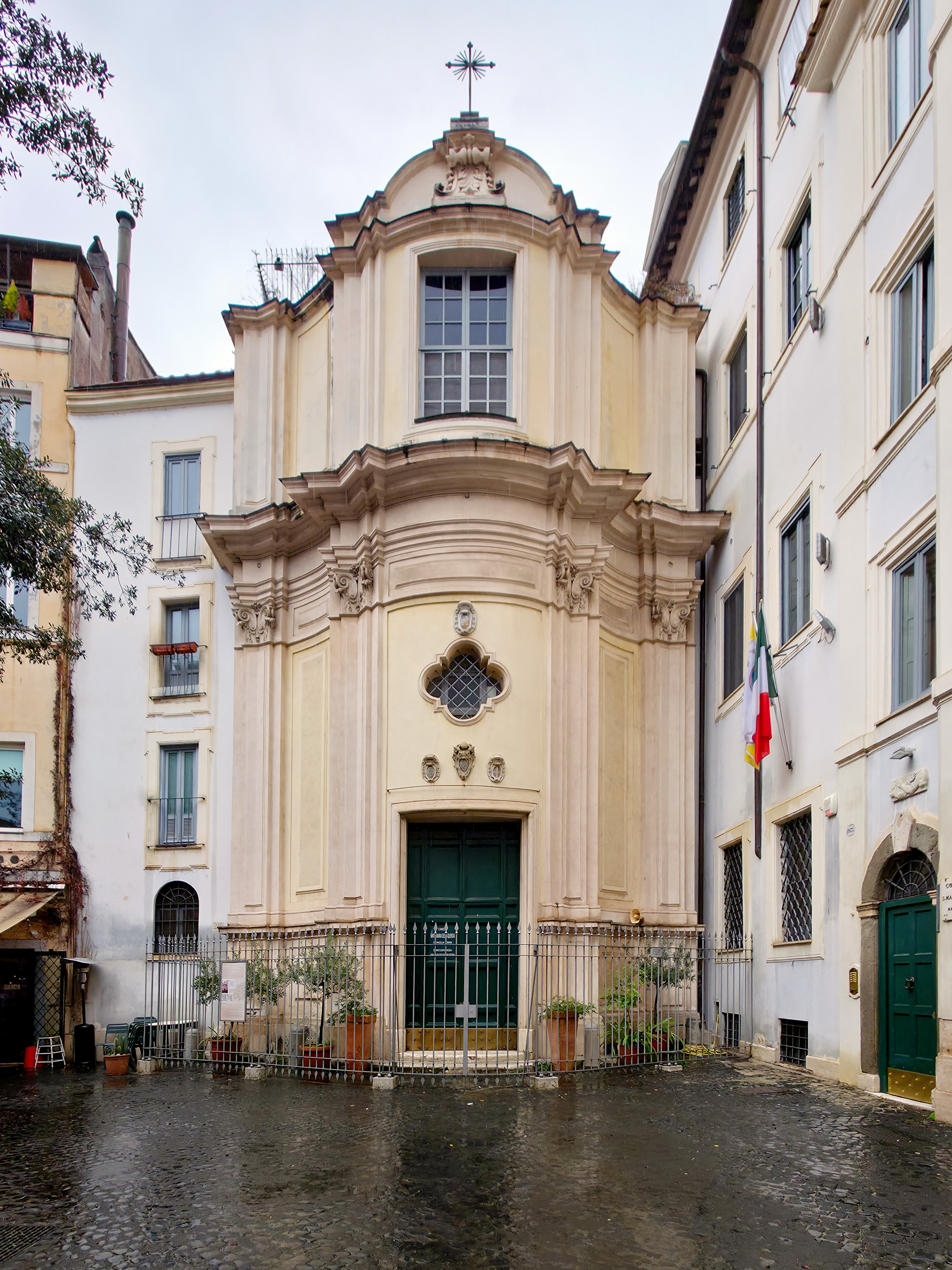
- Facade
- Click on the map for a fullscreen view
- 41°53′41″N 12°28′18″E
- Location: Rome
- Country: Italy
- Denomination: Roman Catholic

Architecture
- Architectural type: Church

Santa Maria della Quercia (Our Lady of the Oak Tree) is a Roman Catholic church located on the piazza of the same name, one block southeast of the Palazzo Farnese in the Rione (district) of Regola of central Rome, Italy.

== History ==
A prior church at the site was named San Niccolò de Curte or de Ferro, with the former referring to the ancient Roman noble family of the Orsini, who had their palace nearby; and the latter name likely referring to the Capodiferro family who once owned the nearby Palazzo Spada in the contiguous Piazza Capo di Ferro.

In 1507, Pope Julius II allowed for the church to represent Viterbo, and the church was renamed after a venerated image of the Virgin from that town that had initially been hung on an oak tree. In addition the quercia or oak was the emblem on the heraldic shield of the House of Della Rovere, to which Pope Julius belonged. In the piazza in front, an oak tree is traditionally planted.

In 1532, the Pope Clement VII granted the church to the guild of the Butchers (Macellai), to whom it still belongs. Pope Benedict XIII in the early 18th century entrusted the reconstruction to Filippo Raguzzini, later completed by Domenico Gregorini by 1731.

In the 19th century, restorations were again pursued by Pope Pius IX, and other continued after the Second World War.

== Interior ==
The church layout is in a Greek cross with a cupola and three chapels. The ceiling has a painting of the Sacrifice of Isaac by Sebastiano Conca. To the right of the entrance is a depiction of the Baptism of Christ by Pietro Barbieri and to the left of the entrance, a Crucifixion by Filippo Evangelista. Above the main altar is a replica of the icon of the Madonna della Quercia di Viterbo.

== See also ==
- Basilica of Santa Maria della Quercia, Viterbo

== Sources ==
- M. Armellini, Le chiese di Roma dal secolo IV al XIX, Roma 1891
- C. Hulsen, Le chiese di Roma nel Medio Evo, Firenze 1927
- F. Titi, Descrizione delle Pitture, Sculture e Architetture esposte in Roma, Roma 1763

== Bibliography ==
- C. Rendina, Le Chiese di Roma, Newton & Compton Editori, Milano 2000, p. 213
- M. Quercioli, Rione VII Regola, in AA.VV, I rioni di Roma, Newton & Compton Editori, Milano 2000, Vol. II, pp. 448–498
- G. Ciprini – F. Ciprini, La confraternita di S. Maria della Quercia de’ Macellari di Roma, Roma 2004
- Description of the church from the website of the Confraternity
