= French brig Colibri =

History

France
- Name: Colibri
- Ordered: October 1801
- Builder: Louis, Antoine, & Mathurin Crucy, Basse-Indre Design by Jean-Michel Segondat.
- Launched: 22 May 1802
- Commissioned: 5 July 1802
- Renamed: Saint Pierre on 1 September 1802
- Fate: Donated to the Papal Navy in December 1802

Papal States
- Name: San Pietro
- Acquired: December 1802
- Captured: June 1806

France
- Name: San Petro
- Acquired: June 1806 by capture
- Renamed: Saint Pierre in May 1809
- Fate: Struck 1813

General characteristics
- Class & type: Alcyon-class
- Displacement: 280 tons (French)
- Tons burthen: 150 (French; "of load")
- Length: 27 m (88.6 ft) (overall)
- Beam: 8.5 m (27.89 ft)
- Propulsion: Sails
- Sail plan: Brig
- Armament: 16 × 4-pounder guns

Colibri was a brig launched in 1802 for the French Navy. Between 14 and 16 August Colibri cruised the Atlantic as she sailed to Cadiz. She was under the command of enseigne de vaisseau Jourdain.

She was renamed Saint Pierre on 1 September 1802. Napoleon ordered the name change preparatory to donating her to Pope Pius VII. Saint Pierre left Toulon on 14 December and arrived at Civitavecchia on 16 December. She sailed in company with a second gift, the somewhat over-aged brig San Paulo, escorted by Alcyon. Lieutenant Dornaldéguy performed the official transfer of the ships to the papal delegate.

In the service of the Papal Navy she was renamed San Pietro. The French Navy seized her at Civitavechia in June 1806 and listed her as San Petro. The French Empire annexed Civitavecchia in May 1809; at that time she reverted to the name Saint Pierre. She remained at Civitavechia until January 1813, when the French Navy found her to be unserviceable and had her struck from the Navy list.

The schematics of the ornamentation of Colibri are stored at the Service Historique de la Marine in Paris (8DD1.2 no 6) and were published in Lepelley's monograph on Manche.

== See also ==
- Papal Navy
