= Santa Maria della Luce, Rome =

Church of Santa Maria della Luce
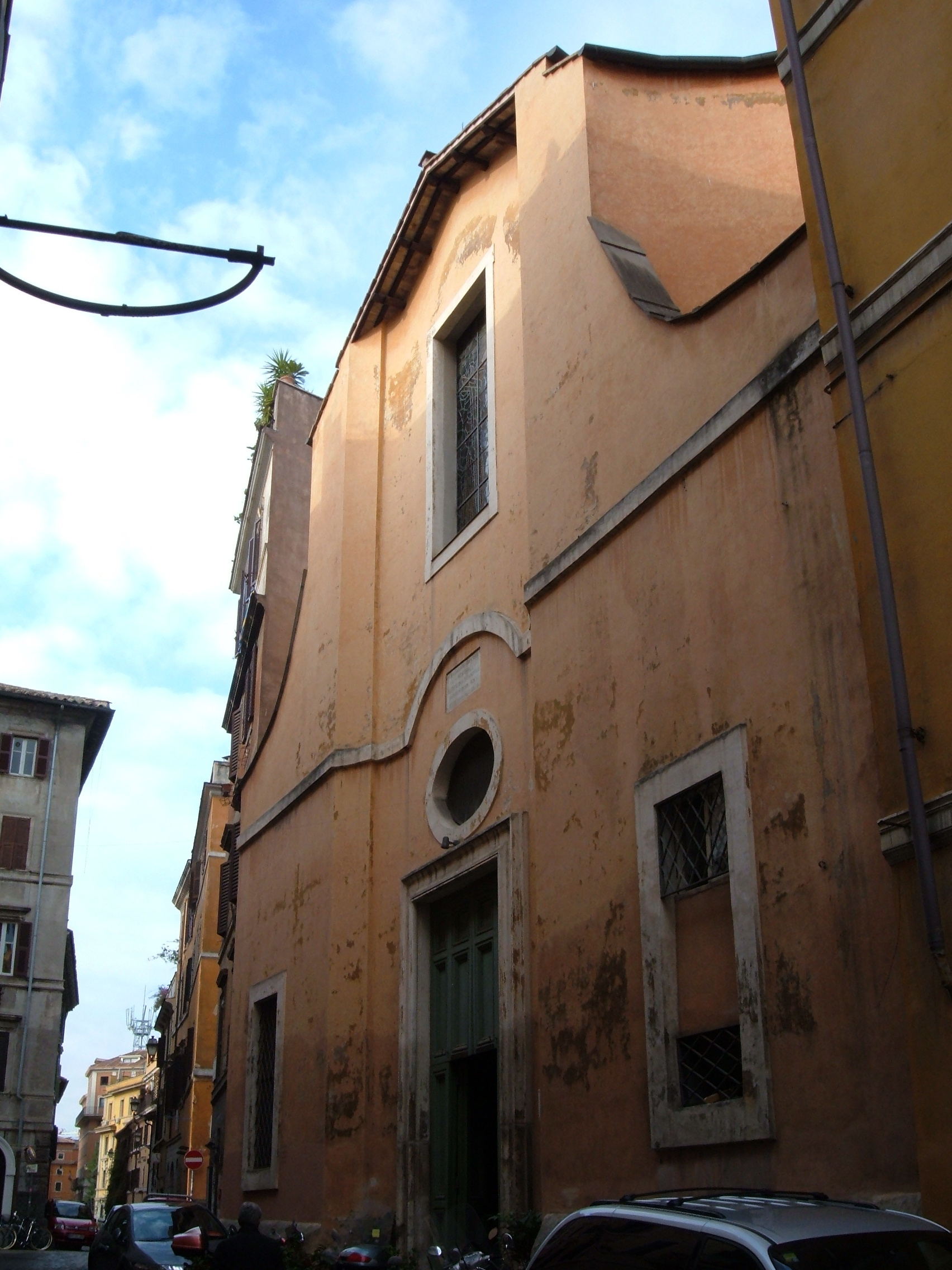
- Facade
- Click on the map for a fullscreen view
- 41°53′21″N 12°28′32″E
- Location: Rome
- Country: Italy
- Denomination: Roman Catholic

Architecture
- Architect: Gabriele Valvassori
- Architectural type: Church
- Style: Romanesque & Baroque
- Groundbreaking: 12th century

The church of Santa Maria della Luce is an ancient church in the Rione of Trastevere in Rome, Italy.

The church was originally known as San Salvatore in Corte. That church was founded by Saint Bonosa in the 4th century at the site of the excubitorium or barracks of the "cohort VII Brigade". The church was rebuilt in the 12th century, together with bell-tower, which is still preserved. In 1595, the church was placed under the jurisdiction of the nearby Basilica of San Crisogono. In 1728, a Pope Benedict XIII assigned the church to the Minims, an order established by St. Francis of Paola.

The current name of the church dates from 1730, when a series of miracles were linked to an icon painted on the exterior of a nearby house nearby, which was seen to emit light. The image was then transferred to the Church, and changed name. The church interior underwent reconstruction by architect Gabriele Valvassori, though the facade remained unfinished. The apse, even after Baroque restoration, still shows signs of the original Romanesque architecture. The apse is frescoed with The Eternal Father by Sebastiano Conca.

The chapel of St Joseph on the right has an altarpiece depicting the Death of St Joseph (1754) by Giovanni Conca. The chapel of St Francis of Paola is on the left, and has an altarpiece depicting Saints Francis de Sales and John of Valois. The chapel on the right dedicated to Saints Joachim and Anne has an altarpiece depicting the Family of the Virgin (1753) by Pietro Labruzzi. Other chapels have modern artworks mostly showing Latin American devotions. There is also a painting by Onofrio Avellino depicting Miracle of St Francis of Paola walking across the Straits of Messina (1700).

From 2003, the church is home a Latin-American Mission, which aims to serve migrants from that region living in the Diocese of Rome, entrusted to priests of the Scalabriniani order. The Mission offers many services to the Latin American community ranging from social to religious.
