= Filippo Raguzzini =

Italian architect (1690–1771)

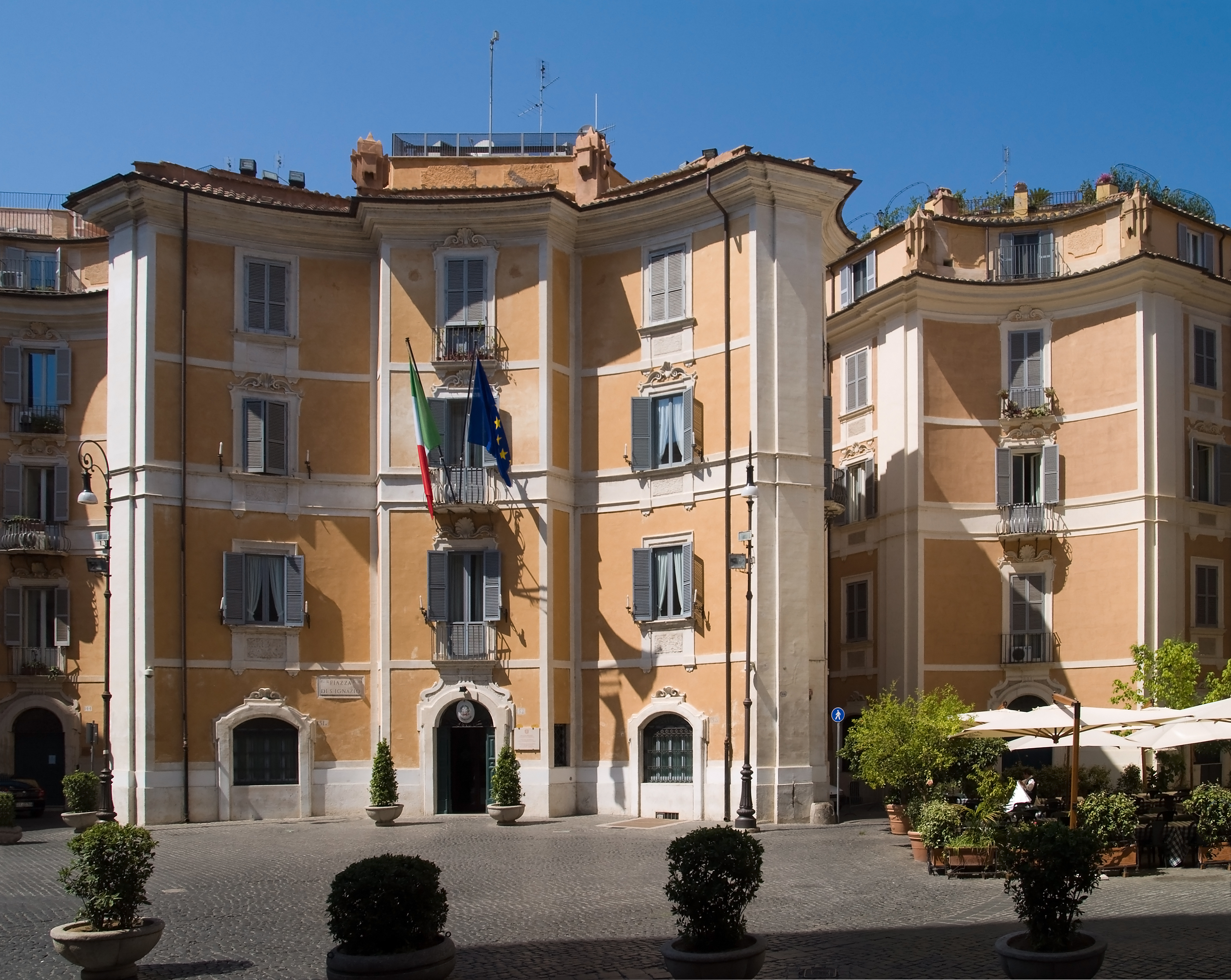
Piazza sant'Ignazio in Rome

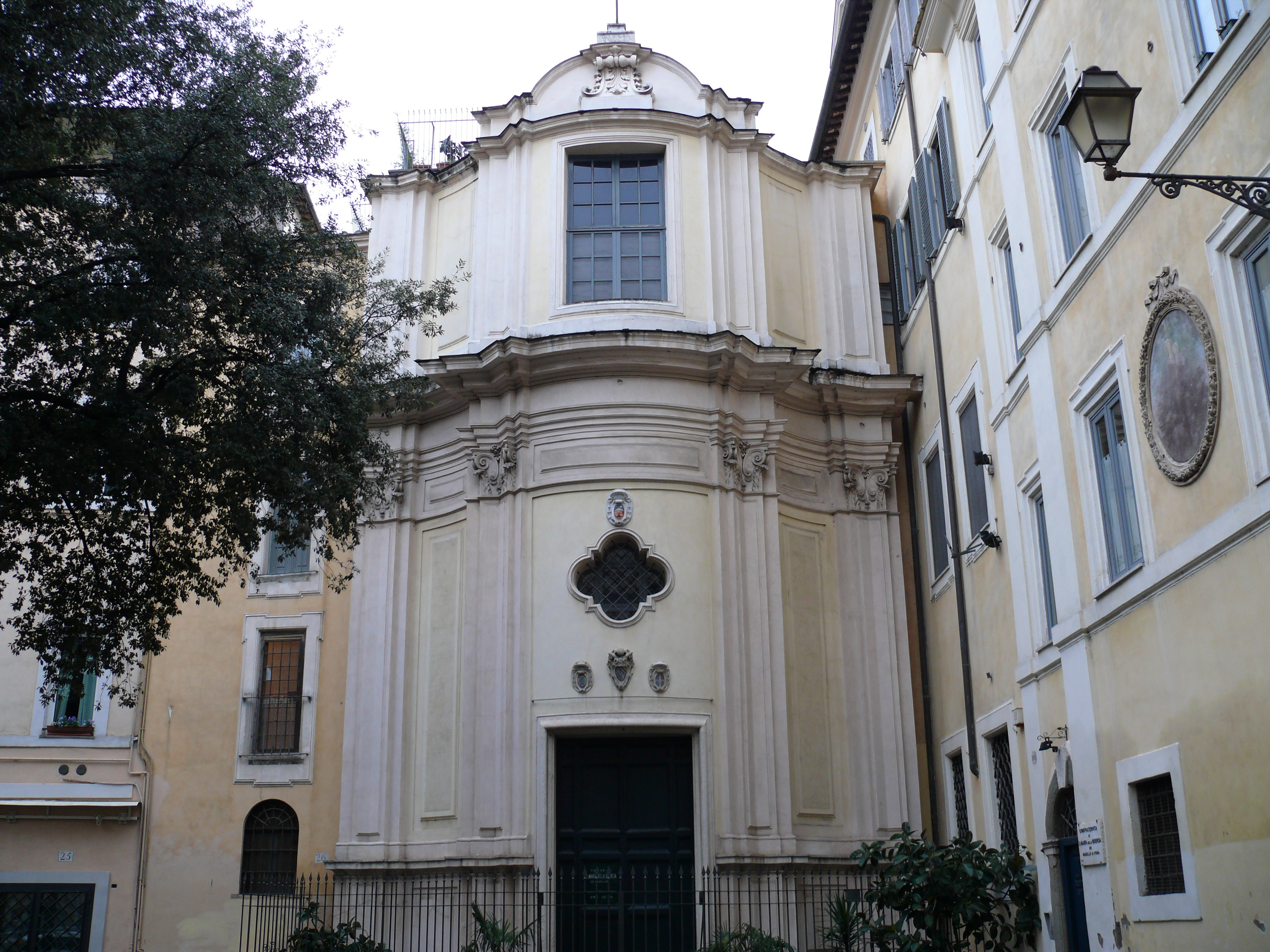
The façade of Raguzzini's S. Maria della Quercia

The façade of S. Sisto Vecchio, remodelled by Raguzzini

Filippo Raguzzini (19 July 1690 – 21 February 1771) was an Italian architect best known for a range of buildings constructed during the reign of Benedict XIII.

== Biography ==
Raguzzini was born in Naples into a family of stonemasons. Little is known of his early history, but he was called to Benevento in the wake of the earthquake of 1702, which caused widespread destruction in the city. In Benevento, he came to the attention of Pietro Francesco Orsini, the then archbishop of Benevento for 38 years, who in 1724 became Benedict XIII. This encounter with Orsini would be of crucial significance for Raguzzini's later career. There is considerable scholarly debate about which works in Benevento should be attributed to Raguzzini's early period, but the chapel of San Gennaro in the church of the Annunziata (1710) is thought to be his work. Two later churches, San Filippo (1724–27) and San Bartolomeo (consecrated in 1729) in Benevento, are attributed to Raguzzini from the period after Benedict XIII's election.

Once Benedict XIII was elected, Raguzzini moved to Rome and commenced a meteoric rise to the top of the papal architectural establishment. Official honours were lavished on him from as early as 1725, when he was made a Knight of the Golden Spur; in February 1727, he was elected an accademico di merito of the Accademia di San Luca. The pope's patronage saw Raguzzini ultimately serve in almost every major public architectural office in the city. The most significant posts he held were those in which he supplanted the much older and highly respected Roman architect, Alessandro Specchi, whose most important work, the Porto di Ripetta, had been executed in the reign of Clement XI: these roles were those of the architect of the popolo romano (essentially the city architect), the architect of the Tribunale delle acque e strade and the architect of the Sacri Palazzi Apostolici. Raguzzini held these offices from 1728, although they were nominally to be held by the incumbent for life. Specchi died in November 1729.

Benedict XIII's reign was marked by financial mismanagement. Benedict himself practically vacated the temporal government of Rome and the Papal States, turning this over to Cardinal Niccolò Coscia who nearly bankrupted the State, and which ultimately led to the cardinal's temporary excommunication and imprisonment in the reign of Clement XII. As a result, few major architectural projects were started during Benedict's reign. The most significant projects executed in Rome by Raguzzini during Benedict's reign were the construction of the Ospedale di San Gallicano in Trastevere (1724 – 26), the erection of the church of Santa Maria della Quercia near the Palazzo Spada (1727 – 31) and the systematisation of Piazza Sant'Ignazio (1727 – 35).

The construction of San Maria della Quercia, the church of the butchers' guild (Università dei macellai) of Rome, appears to have been sponsored by Benedict XIII. The church is named for a miraculous image housed at Viterbo in the care of the Dominicans and, as Dominican himself, Benedict seems to have taken a keen interest in the church. Although renovated, this church is a masterpiece of the style of the 1720s – 1730s and is one of the few early 18th century churches in Rome built from the ground up and designed by a single person.

Piazza Sant'Ignazio, surrounded by an ensemble of five residential buildings for the growing administration class of the city, is characterised by its complex interplay of ovoid shapes and the ingenious theatre-wing like construction. People walking from the nearby Piazza di Pietra find themselves suddenly emerging in Piazza S. Ignazio into a confrontation with the church, as if they had stumbled in from offstage. Although the decorative effect of the buildings is an important component of their overall effect, the ensemble signifies a significant departure from the typical operative logic of the anteposed piazza. Raguzzini subtly undermines the supremacy of the church in the church/piazza relationship typical of Counter-Reformation urban planning, and invests the space of the piazza itself with considerable energy and intrigue: in this way, the church has become a pendant to the piazza, rather than the reason for the piazza's existence.

Raguzzini's other projects at this time were small commissions, including the renovation of the chapels of the Presepio in the baptistery of San Domenico and the chapel of the Crucifix in the Dominican church of Santa Maria sopra Minerva (1724–1726); the restoration of the church and convent of San Sisto Vecchio near the Baths of Caracalla (completed 1727); minor works in the Sistine Chapel of Santa Maria Maggiore (1725), in San Giovanni in Laterano (1726) and in S. Pietro in Vaticano (1726); the restoration of the high altar in San Simeone Profeta (1724); the enlargement of the convent annexed to Santa Maria in Campitelli (1724) and many others. Outside Rome, Raguzzini was responsible for the building of the Casino Lercari in Albano.

When Benedict his patron died in 1730, Raguzzini's fortunes took a turn for the worse, when the coterie of Beneventans brought to Rome by the pope were purged. According to the testimony of Pier Leone Ghezzi, Raguzzini was arrested in the piazza di Trevi on 4 September 1731 and held under house arrest as part of this purge. Although subsequently stripped of many of his official positions, Raguzzini regained many of them through legal action. He was named a virtuoso of the Congregazione al Pantheon in September 1749, which appears to indicate a measure of official rehabilitation. His output from the mid-1730s onward is very small, although his name is frequently encountered in official processes of the Tribunale delle strade. He died in Rome.
