= Papal corvette Immacolata Concezione =

Papal Navy corvette, launched in 1858

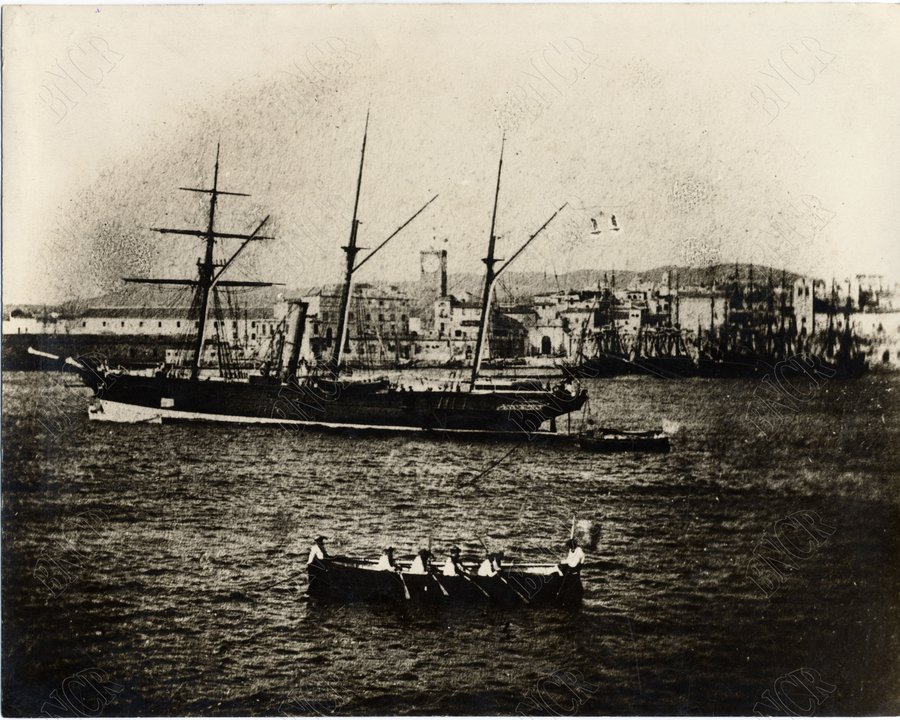
- Immacolata Concezione in Civitavecchia, 1870

History

Papal States
- Name: Immacolata Concezione
- Namesake: Immaculate Conception of Mary
- Owner: Papal Navy
- Builder: Thames Ironworks and Shipbuilding Company, Blackwall, London
- Launched: 1858
- Commissioned: 1859
- Decommissioned: 1870
- In service: 1859-1870
- Honours and awards: Siege of Ancona 1860 (Ammunition transport)
- Fate: Transferred to Royal Italian Navy

Kingdom of Italy
- Name: RN Immacolata Concezione
- Operator: Regia Marina
- Port of registry: Civitavecchia
- Out of service: 1871
- Fate: Moved to Toulon, France, by orders of Pope Pius IX

France
- Name: Bateau école Conception Immaculée
- Operator: l'École dominicaine de Saint Elme à Arcachon
- Port of registry: Toulon
- Out of service: 1877–1880
- Fate: Possibly scrapped in mid-1880s, possibly continued sea-going service until the early-1900s

General characteristics
- Class & type: Screw Corvette
- Displacement: 652 t
- Length: 178 ft 8 in (54.46 m)
- Height: 8.1 m (27 ft)
- Installed power: 720 ihp (540 kW)
- Propulsion: 1 steam engine, powered by 1 propeller
- Speed: 10 knots (19 km/h; 12 mph) approx.
- Armament: Unknown, Probably 8 Armstrong Guns (4 on each side)

Immacolata Concezione was a screw corvette of the Papal Navy, built in the English shipyards of Thames Ironworks and Shipbuilding Company in Blackwall and launched in 1858. The overall design is very similar to the Thames Company's much larger and more famous HMS Warrior, which was launched two years later. The Immacolata Concezione was delivered to Civitavecchia in 1859.

It was originally intended to be the papal yacht, in view of overseas voyages, and initially a pilgrimage to the Holy Land which, for reasons related to the political situation of time, was not fulfilled. The ship then served in coastal waters again for the benefit of the papal authorities, and in 1860 transporting materials and ammunition to Ancona. Remarkable was a trip to the Mediterranean with scientific purposes made in 1865, in which father Angelo Secchi carried out some experiments on the transparency of water.

After the Capture of Rome, the ship was registered in the rolls of the Royal Italian Navy, but left at the disposal of the Pope, who never used it due to voluntary confinement in the Vatican in 1871. Pius IX ordered his commander Alessandro Cialdi to bring the ship to Toulon, where she was laid up until 1877. Later it was sold to an ecclesiastical merchant marine academy, the Dominican School of Saint Elme in Arcachon, and used as a school ship for its cadets, until it was sold due to the economic difficulties of the school to the shipowner Gaillard in 1882 or 1883 and subsequently used as a cargo carrier or was simply scrapped. The United States Naval Institute claims that she was spotted in 1905 at Algiers registered under the name of Loire. The Loire would later allegedly be beached near Ajaccio after being near totally destroyed by a fire, though it is unclear if this was truly the original Immacolata Concezione or simply another ship mistaken for it.

== See also ==
- Italian corvette Vettor Pisani
- Italian corvette Caracciolo (1869)
- Italian corvette Cristoforo Colombo (1875)
- Italian corvette Amerigo Vespucci
