= Papal Navy =

Navy of the Papal States (c. 843–1870)

Papal Navy Pontifical Navy
- Italian: Marina Pontificia; Latin: Classis Pontificiae
- Ensign of the Papal Navy, depicting Sts. Peter and Paul
- Active: circa 843–1870
- Disbanded: De facto: 1870 (capture of Rome by the nascent Kingdom of Italy); De jure: 1878 (sale of last warship controlled by Papacy)
- Country: Papal States
- Allegiance: The Pope
- Type: Navy
- Patron: Saint Peter; Saint Paul
- Engagements: Battle of Ostia, 849; Battle of Garigliano, 915; Battle of Lepanto, 1571; Italian revolutions, 1848; Siege of Ancona, 1865

Commanders
- Notable commanders: Cardinal Ludovico Trevisan (Appointed Captain-General of the Church in 1455 by Pope Callixtus III; Under Trevisan, the Papal fleet was greatly expanded and won several victories over the Turks) Archbishop of Tarragona Pedro de Urrea (Appointed a Papal expedition fleet commander under Cardinal Trevisan in the 1450s) Velasco Farinha (Portuguese naval officer appointed as a vice admiral of the Papal Navy in the 1450s under Cardinal Trevisan) Duke-Prince Marcantonio Colonna (Appointed captain-general of the Holy League’s fleet, encompassing the Papal Navy, during the 1571 Battle of Lepanto) Alessandro Cialdi (19th-century commandant and final commander of the Papal Navy)

The Papal Navy (Italian: Marina Pontificia, "Pontifical Navy"; Latin: Classis Pontificiae) was the maritime force of the Papal States. Loosely constituted, it was sporadically extant from approximately the Battle of Ostia (849) during the pontificate of Leo IV until the ascension of Pope Leo XIII in 1878 (though the Navy had ceased all operations in 1870), when he sold the last remaining Papal warship, the Immacolata Concezione.

The Papal Navy was separate from the Papal Army, a varying combination of volunteers, mercenaries, and Catholic military orders, disbanded in 1870. The modern Vatican City State does not maintain any naval or maritime forces and does not include any significant bodies of water.

== History ==
=== Birth ===
Originally protected by the Byzantine navy, the Papal States found itself in need of a naval force of its own following a Muslim raid on Rome in 843 and the sack of the city's basilicas extra muros in 846. Under the leadership of Caesar, prince of Naples, a force of Neapolitan, Amalfitan, Gaetan, and Papal ships repulsed the pirates off Ostia in 849; this first engagement marked the birth of the Papal Navy. In 877, Pope John VIII personally commanded a new Papal fleet into battle against Saracen invaders, winning a victory near Terracina, where the Pope's sailors captured 18 galleys and freed 600 galley slaves.

=== Role in the Crusades ===
In response to Mujahid's invasion of Sardinia in 1015/16, Pope Benedict VIII supported Pisan, Genoese, and Neapolitan combined expeditions to liberate the island; Thietmar of Merseburg states that Benedict dispatched a galley fleet to relieve the island. Pope Victor III (the immediate predecessor of Urban II) likewise organized a fleet of 300 ships to fight the Saracens at sea; this naval war begun by Pope Victor would soon become a core part of the Crusades first inaugurated by Pope Urban, and the fight at sea between Christian and Muslim navies would continue with little reprieve for centuries.

The Papal States subsidized various fleets during the Crusades and outfitted some squadrons of their own, which participated with Venice and other European Christian states and orders against the Saracen naval forces. Most of the Frisian fleet en route to the Fifth Crusade wintered in Civitavecchia on their way to Egypt in 1217; 18 ships wintered in nearby Corneto as their fleet was too large to all harbor together. In 1241, amidst the Guelphs and Ghibellines War and the papal election, Emperor Frederick II dispatched a combined Imperial-Pisan fleet of 16 galleys to Civitavecchia as part of an intense coercion against the conclave of the College of Cardinals - he simultaneously surrounded the city of Rome with Imperial soldiers. In 1244, Pope Innocent IV - lacking an independent maritime capability - asked his Lombard ally Genoa to ferry him to France to secure French support against the continued encroachments of the Emperor. 22 Genoese galleys arrived in Civitavecchia, received a papal blessing, and departed for France with Innocent aboard.

By 1291, the Papal Navy had been briefly revived - Pope Nicholas IV used his navy's 10 galleys along with 20 galleys chartered from Venice in a last-ditch attempt to reinforce Acre with 2,500 papal soldiers; the Papal fleet was defeated in battle and was too late to save the city from capture, but the navy was able to evacuate the people of Acre to Cyprus.

In 1334, four Papal galleys fought as part of the Holy League's fleet of 34 ships at the Battle of Adramyttion, where the League ultimately sank roughly 150 Turkish ships. Ten years later, Papal galleys fought as part of another Christian fleet of 24 ships in the 1344 Battle of Pallene, where they destroyed roughly 52 Turkish ships. Several months after that battle, the Christian fleet also captured the port city of Smyrna in Anatolia, which remained under Christian control until 1402.

=== Italian wars ===
After several decades of competing loyalties in Italy (the papacy was in the process of returning to Italy from France and reconstituting its control over the former Papal territories) and no recorded Papal fleet, in 1431 the Papal Army, led by gonfaloniere Niccolò Fortebraccio and with strong Venetian assistance, launched an amphibious assault against Civitavecchia and recaptured it. In 1453, after a siege of only 53 days, the Ottoman army captured Constantinople and ended the Eastern Roman Empire; the loss of the Byzantine buffer made mainland Europe accessible to the Ottomans, and greatly disrupted the existing European balance of power. In response, Pope Callixtus III established a shipyard on the Tiber river and rapidly assembled a Papal fleet of galleys and transports (roughly 60 ships in all). In 1456, this fleet departed (carrying 300 cannons and 5,000 Papal soldiers) for the Aegean Sea, where it spent three years in regular combat with the Ottomans. In 1481, four papal galleys - gifted to the Papal Navy by Florence - participated in the successful crusade to liberate Otranto from its recent capture by the Ottomans, ferrying the combined Neapolitan-Hungarian army to Otranto. Although this crusade was a success, the four Papal galleys had all abandoned the fighting early because of concerns regarding the ongoing Black Death, which caused Ferdinand I of Naples to send his ambassador to Civitavecchia to demand the Pope to explain the Papal fleet's departure and formally dissolve their league of alliance (Pope Sixtus IV had intended for the crusading forces, upon liberating Otranto, to sail to and liberate Ottoman-held Vlorë as well). In 1486, Pope Innocent VIII commissioned the construction of four "triremes" in Civitavecchia to protect against piracy.

In 1494, Charles VIII of France captured Civitavecchia, and held the city for several months until he reached terms with Pope Alexander VI and returned the city. In 1496, a fleet of Venetian galleys and three Spanish ships commanded by Cesare Borgia (Alexander VI's son) arrived in Civitavecchia to reinforce the papacy during a period of pro-French unrest. Alexander VI soon ordered the Papal Navy to be revived, commissioning a modest fleet to engage in coastal patrol. In 1501, six galleys were launched at Civitavecchia; in 1502, an additional six galleys, six galleots, and two oared galleons were completed. During the War of the League of Cambrai, both a Venetian and a Spanish fleet came to Civitavecchia (in 1509 and 1512, respectively) to reinforce Pope Julius II, the Venetian ships flying the Papal Crossed Keys of St. Peter alongside the Venetian Lion of St. Mark.

Following the loss of Rhodes to the Ottomans, from 1523 to 1530, the Navy of the Knights Hospitaller was stationed in Civitavecchia alongside the Papal fleet, before the Order established itself in Malta. During this time, Rome was beset with violence and tumult due to the ongoing Italian Wars, with Austria, France, Spain, the Italian states, and other powers all vying for control over Italy and the central Mediterranean. In February 1525, a Spanish brigantine departed from Civitavecchia for mainland France to negotiate terms with the French; the Spanish and the Germans had just defeated the French in the Battle of Pavia days earlier, capturing several French nobles, including the French king Francis I. The Spanish brigantine returned in May to carry Francis off to Madrid, where he would remain in Spanish captivity until the Spanish and the French negotiated terms in March 1526. In May 1526, a mercenary fleet commanded by Andrea Doria arrived in Civitavecchia and offered to join the Papal Navy; when Pope Clement VII and Francis I formed the League of Cognac later that month, Doria was made commander of the League's (mostly French) naval forces until June 1528, when he defected and was made the grand admiral of Charles V's Imperial Navy - though by this time the Papal Navy was no longer involved in the war. On May 6th 1527, the Imperial Army sacked Rome and besieged Clement VII in Castel Sant'Angelo, capturing him one month later on June 5th. The Pope was a prisoner of Charles V until November 26th, when the Pope accepted terms and was released - one of the conditions of this release was the Pope's surrender of the ports of Ostia and Civitavecchia to the Emperor. From May, the Papal Navy had been leaderless - now, with the surrender of Civitavecchia, the Papal fleet was German property. Later negotiations between Clement VII and Charles V resulted in Charles V returning Civitavecchia to the Papal States on March 23rd 1529, in return for the Pope crowning Charles V as "King of Italy" on February 22nd 1530 and "Holy Roman Emperor" two days later; these negotiations also resulted in Charles V giving Malta to the Knights of St. John, beginning Hospitaller rule in Malta.

=== Wars with the Ottomans ===
In 1532, the Papal navy sent its 12 galleys to the Aegean Sea to support a Spanish-Genoese fleet of 48 galleys and 35 vessels. In 1535, the Papal navy again supplied its 12 galleys to the Charles V's Holy League, which numbered 398 ships (including the 366-gun Portuguese São João Baptista) and roughly 30,000 soldiers in total. The League defeated an Ottoman fleet of 84 ships and captured the port city of Tunis.

In 1541, eight galleys of the Papal Navy participated in the Imperial-led Algiers Expedition, part of the Christian fleet of 500 ships commanded by Andrea Doria; the expedition managed to land several thousand soldiers outside of Algiers, but severe weather sunk 150 of the fleet's ships and the expedition ended in miserable failure, with thousands killed and thousands more abandoned and enslaved in Algiers. In September 1556, the Spanish invaded and occupied the Papal States - the occupation ended one year later, with the September 1557 signing of a peace treaty between Pope Paul IV and the Spanish Fernando Álvarez de Toledo, 3rd Duke of Alba. In 1560, the Papal Navy participated in a campaign to capture Tripoli and fought in the Battle of Djerba, part of the Christian fleet of roughly 120 commanded by Gianandrea Doria, the great-nephew of Andrea Doria. The Christian fleet lost the battle, which ended the Tripoli campaign; half of the fleet was sunk, thousands of sailors perished, and thousands of soldiers who had been landed and entrenched on the island of Djerba were besieged by the Ottomans for three months before being captured during an unsuccessful attempt to break out of the siege. None of the Papal ships survived the battle.

In 1571, Pope Pius V, determined to break the Ottoman fleet's grip on the Mediterranean, organized the Holy League - a military alliance between the Papal States, Spain, Venice, Genoa, the Knights of St. John, Tuscany, Savoy, Urbino, and Parma. In October 1571, the 12 galleys of the Papal Navy (recently purchased from Venice) fought in the Battle of Lepanto, a desperate naval defense which would prove to be the decisive turning point in Europe's centuries-long naval war with the Ottoman Empire. The battle was a stunning victory for the Christian fleet. Under the command of John of Austria, the Christian fleet of 212 ships defeated the Ottoman fleet of 278 ships, sinking 70 Ottoman ships, capturing 117, and losing only 13 ships in the process. Roughly 10,000 Christian soldiers and sailors were killed, compared to roughly 20,000 Ottomans. Though the Ottoman fleet was fully rebuilt within half a year of the battle, the Ottomans never again threatened European control of the western Mediterranean. After almost a year of internal squabbling, the Holy League attempted to repeat their success in September 1572 by besieging the new Ottoman fleet at Navarino. The Christian fleet made several unsuccessful attempts to enter the harbor of Modon, which failed because of the strength of the Ottoman's defenses, especially in the overlooking castle of Navarino. John of Austria then landed 5,000 soldiers and made several attempts to capture Navarino castle, but to no avail. After two weeks of siege with no success, and learning that 20,000 Ottoman cavalry were coming to relieve Navarino, the Holy League withdrew from Navarino on October 7th 1572 - exactly one year after the ecstatic victory of Lepanto. 750 Christian soldiers died in the fight for Navarino, and only 1 Ottoman ship was destroyed, but - unlike in Algiers and in Djerba - the Christian fleet had remained intact, and were able to evacuate their entire landing force without abandoning anyone.

At the beginning of his pontificate, Sixtus V ordered the construction of a permanent fleet of 10 triremes for the Papal Navy. In 1597, Clement VIII visited Civitavecchia, and went on an excursion to the sea aboard the naval flagship. Upon returning to Rome, Clement VIII instructed that a lighthouse be built in Civitavecchia; in 1608, the Faro lighthouse was completed in Civitavecchia, standing 31m tall and illuminated by a tallow- and tar-fuelled fire. In 1624, three Papal galleys were part of a combined Neapolitan-Tuscan-Papal fleet totaling 15 galleys, which in October surprised a small fleet of six Barbary ships; two Barbary ships were sunk, and the other four were captured. During the pontificate of Innocent X, the Papal Navy launched several times from Civitavecchia to fight the Ottoman fleets in the Levant, including a galley fleet sailing to Candia in 1645 under the command of Niccolò Ludovisi, the Pope's nephew.

During Jubilee Year 1650, the Papal Navy remained on patrol in Civitavecchia to defend pilgrims from the threat of Ottoman raiders. After the death of Innocent X, the conclave decided to increase the Papal fleet and dispatch it to assist the Venetians in Crete, which was then in the midst of being conquered by the Ottomans. In 1657, another Papal fleet was sent to the Aegean, where it fought in the Fourth Battle of the Dardanelles alongside the Venetians and the Maltese. 67 Christian ships faced 47 Ottoman ships, and initially the Christian fleet was superior - nine Ottoman galleys were captured in short order, initially without the loss of any Christian ships. As the battle progressed, a Turkish barge (which the Venetians had captured in a previous encounter) was recaptured by 60 Turkish soldiers in rowboats. The Venetian flagship advanced towards the Ottoman lines, but was struck in its magazine and exploded - the Venetian fleet was totally demoralized, and immediately withdrew. The day after the defeat, the Venetian fleet withdrew to Tenedos; the Maltese and the Papals withdrew three days later, sailing back to their home ports. In May 1667, Candia, the capital of Crete, was brought under intense siege by the Ottomans, and the situation grew even more dire; more Papal ships were sent to Candia to assist the Venetian-led fleet. In 1668 another Papal fleet was sent to Candia, where it participated in the alliance's seizure of the island fort St. Marina - which would turn out to be the alliance's last victory of the war. In 1669 another Papal fleet of seven galleys was sent to Candia, to support a final Franco-Maltese fleet attempting to lift the siege of the city. On August 27th, the Venetian commander, Francesco Morosini decided that the city could no longer be held, and sought terms from the Ottomans; after decades of fighting and days of negotiations, Candia was surrendered to the Ottomans on September 5th 1669, and the war was lost.

In 1684, following a visit and a blessing from Pope Innocent XI, the Papal fleet of 10 galleys departed Civitavecchia to assist the Venetians in the Siege of Santa Maura and the capture of Preveza Castle. In 1690, the Papal Navy departed Civitavecchia with three battalions of Papal infantry, participating in the final actions of the liberation of the Morea. In 1696, the Papal Navy participated in the Battle of Andros, sending a number of ships to support the combined Venetian and Maltese fleet. Over the course of three days, sporadic winds meant that both fleets spent agonizingly long interludes in clear view of the enemy fleet but unable to maneuver into a firing position, only able to attack their foes in short, opportunistic bursts. In the evening of the third day, the Ottomans withdrew; the Venetian-led fleet spent the next three months searching for their Ottoman adversary, only to learn that the Ottomans had already returned to the Dardanelles. At the beginning of Pope Clement XI's pontificate, the Papal navy was ordered to expand its patrol area to run from the Strait of Messina to Montecristo. Under Clement XI, four new galleys were constructed: the San Giuseppe, San Carlo, San Ciriaco, and Nostra Signora di Loreto.

In 1715, Pope Clement XI constructed the Pontifical Arsenal near Porta Portese in Ripa Grande on the Tiber. That same year, the Papal fleet joined the combined Maltese and Venetian fleet, totally 67 ships, in the unsuccessful defense against the Ottoman reconquest of Morea. In July 1716, the Papal Navy - then consisting of seven galleys, four galleons, two feluccas and seven additional vessels - departed Civitavecchia to help break the Ottoman siege of Corfu; on this occasion, the Catholic fleet was successful in repelling the Ottoman invaders. The timely arrival of four Papal galleys and four Papal-chartered ships-of-the-line, along with five Spanish, three Tuscan, and two Genoese galleys, prevented the Ottomans from completing their encirclement of Corfu, maintaining a pivot sea line of communication between Corfu and Christendom. In July 1717, four Papal galleys fought as part of a Venetian-led Catholic fleet of 52 ships at the Battle of Matapan; the Catholic squadrons fought an Ottoman fleet of 59 ships, and sank 14 Ottoman ships while losing only 3 Catholic ships (the Venetian fireship Capitan Trivisan, the Venetian hospital ship Madonna del Rosario, and one galley). This Ottoman naval defeat marked the end of the unsuccessful Turkish invasion of Corfu.

=== Later 18th century ===
In 1745, a new galley - the San Benedetta - was completed and launched, christened with a blessing from Benedict XIV. In April 1747, the enormous galley Capitana was completed in Civitavecchia, measuring 50m long, triple-masted, and adorned with a statue of the Pope; Benedict XIV returned to Civitavecchia for the Capitana's launch. In 1755, Benedict XIV purchased two 30-gun frigates from Britain, which joined the Papal navy as San Pietro and San Paolo. These ships were the first vessels in the Papal Navy to be completely propelled by sails rather than oars. Just over one month after receiving the frigates, they were sent on patrol and surprised and routed a group of Barbary xebecs and pinks who were preparing to attack a merchant fleet. Several months later, San Paolo intercepted and captured a 94-gun pink with a crew of 150. In 1762, the domestically-built frigate San Clemente was completed and launched in Civitavecchia, and blessed by Pope Clement XIII in a christening ceremony; SanClemente was joined in 1763 another frigate, San Carlo. After a brief period of naval expansion under Popes Benedict XIV and Clement XIII, the Papal Navy slowly withered until, by 1780, it consisted of just three galleys and two corvettes, and its mandate was confined to coastal patrol.

In 1786, the Papal States created the "Truppa di Finanza," the nascent "Guardia di Finanza Pontificia" (Papal Finance Guard), and launched four feluccas in Civitavecchia that same year for the Finance Guard to use for maritime enforcement. In 1791, two prison revolts were attempted in Civitavecchia; both were suppressed, but they caused the Papal government to consider the defenses of their main port city. Between 1792 and 1794, a total of 250 artillery pieces were emplaced along the city walls and manned by a greatly enlarged city garrison. By 1793, the Papal squadron at Civitavecchia consisted of three galleys, two galleots, two coast guards, four launches, eight gunboats, and a sailboat. Over the next five years, two 20-gun corvettes and a bombard were added to the fleet.

=== French Revolutionary and Napoleonic Wars ===
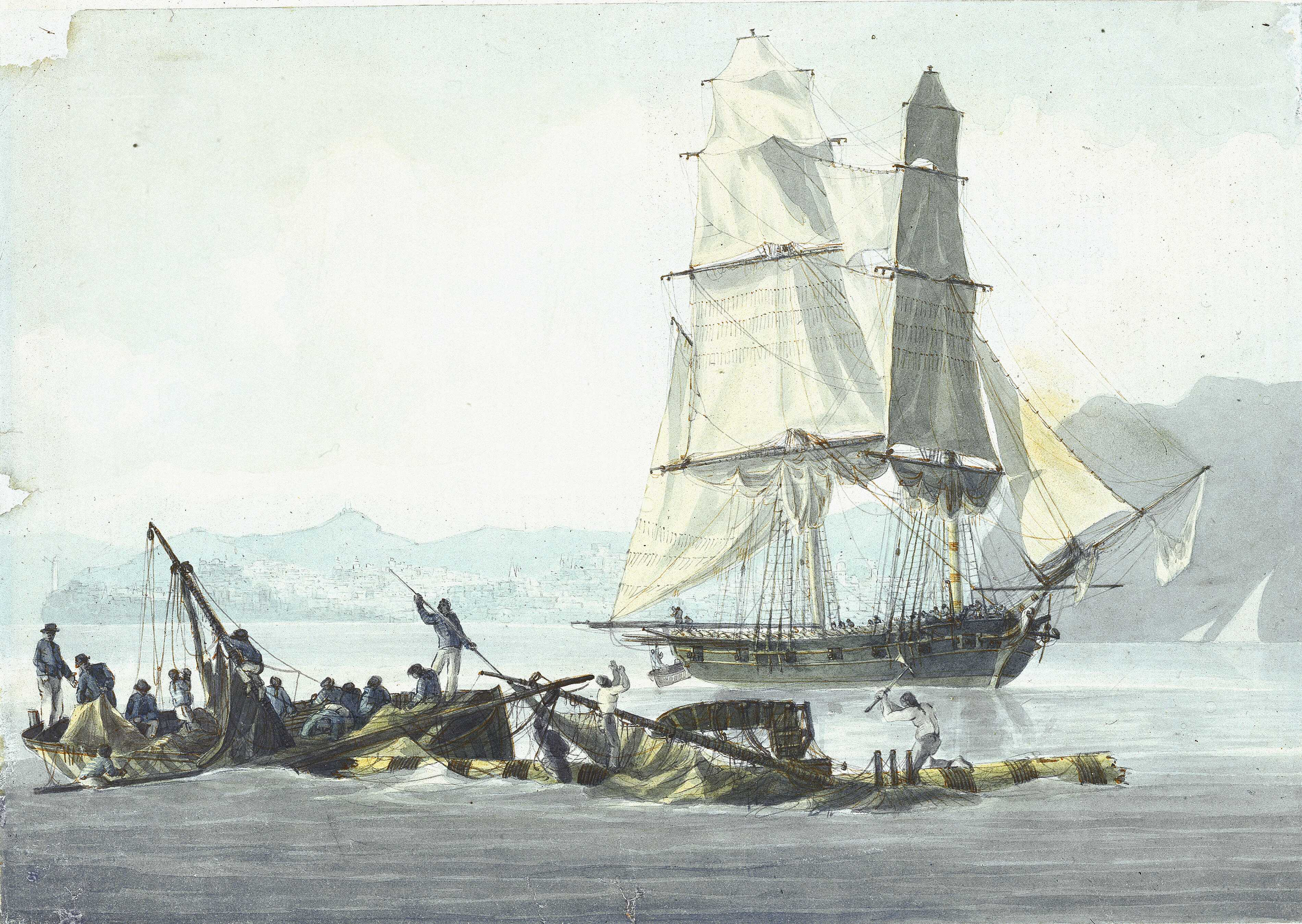
San Paolo as HMS Speedy off Leghorn on 21 March 1800

In 1798, Napoleon conquered the Papal States, capturing the entire Papal fleet and pressing its ships into French service for his Egyptian campaign, where they would all be lost in the Battle of the Nile (along with seventy Civitavecchian sailors). In 1799, the Sanfedismos invaded Napoleonic Rome, liberating the Papal States and restoring pontifical sovereignty over the papacy's ports. In 1802, following the disastrous end of his Egyptian campaign, Napoleon donated two 16-gun brigs to Pope Pius VII and the restored Papal Navy: the somewhat aged Saint Paul, and the brand-new Saint Pierre.

Under the names San Paolo and San Pietro they sat in the arsenal of Civitavecchia until 1806, when San Paolo was struck and San Pietro recaptured by Napoleon, who returned it to the French Imperial Navy; it remained at Civitavecchia under French control (and under its former French name) until 1813, when the French navy deemed her unserviceable and had her struck. In 1814, Papal rule was restored in Rome and the provinces; in Civitavecchia, a garrison of 100 soldiers was raised and the Papal Navy built and launched small coast guards to defend the city and the coast against resurgent piracy, but the papacy no longer had any ship capable of contesting a naval power.

=== 19th century and disbandment ===
Pontifical ships were protected by international treaty in 1819, but the navy only slowly recovered from the seizure of its vessels during the Napoleonic Wars. One was captured by Muslim pirates in 1826, but following a show of force by two frigates and a sloop-of-war from Piedmont under Captain Arnous, the Bey of Tripoli freed the ship with 10,600 francs compensation.

By 1823, the navy comprised the newly-built 12-gun schooner San Pietro, a cutter, a felucca, and a pinnace. Leo XII acquired a small fleet of raiders and luggers, which were converted by the Finance Guard into twelve patrol boats armed with twin mortars to perform coast guard duties in two squadrons, eight vessels in the Adriatic Sea and four in the Tyrrhenian. In 1840, Lt. Col. Alessandro Cialdi directed an expedition to Egypt to retrieve several alabaster monoliths - gifts from Muhammad Ali of Egypt to the pope. A Papal squadron - tartanes San Pietro and San Paolo and the mistico Fedelta - sailed across the Mediterranean, up the Nile, and back to Civitavecchia. On their return in 1841, they were welcomed by Pope Gregory XVI, who expressed interest in reviving the withered Papal Navy. In 1842, this expansion began with the launches of the 12-gun brigs San Gregorio and San Pietro e San Paolo. That same year, Cialdi led three British steamers (Archimede, Papin, and Blasco de Garay, purchased for the Papal Navy) to Rome for navigation on the Tiber; these were the first ships to navigate France from the Atlantic to the Mediterranean, and the first steamships purchased by an Italian state. A fourth steamer, the Roma, participated during the unrest of 1848, opposing the Austrian siege of Ancona. A fifth steamer, the San Paolo, would eventually be added, and at the time of its capture in 1860 became the Sardinian (and later, Italian) Navy's first steam-powered ship (the three steamers Giuseppe Garibaldi used in his Expedition were all merchant ships his supporters had rented, and the Archimedes was also a civilian merchant ship). In 1856, the separate Navy (Marina da Guerra), Finance Navy (Marina di Finanza), and Tiber Navy (Marina del Tevere) administrations were combined into the Pontifical Navy (Marina Pontificia).

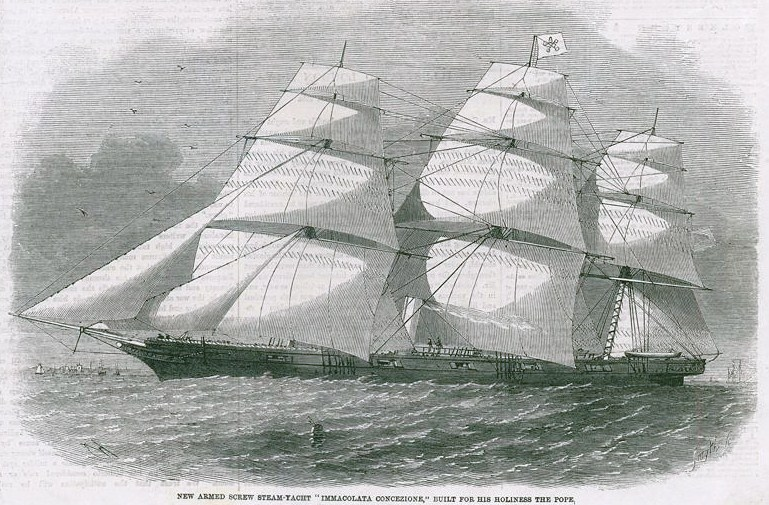
The Immacolata Concezione, an armed steam-powered corvette which served as the flagship (and papal yacht) of the mid-to-late 19th-century Papal Navy

As part of his break from the diplomatic policies of Pope Pius IX, Leo XIII sold off the last ship in the Papal Navy, the corvette Immacolata Concezione, during his first year in office. As the papacy had already been confined to Vatican City following the capture of Rome, it had been docked at Toulon, France. Its flag and a scale model of the vessel are in the Vatican Historical Museum in the Lateran Palace, Rome.

== Ships ==
- At Lepanto:
  - Capitana ("flagship")
  - Padrona ("squadron flagship")
  - Suprema (Supreme)
  - Serena (Serene)
  - Pace (Peace)
  - Vittoria (Victoria)
  - Grifona (Gryphon)
  - Santa Maria
  - San Giovanni
  - Regina (Queen)

- San Bonaventura (St. Bonaventure)
- San Pietro, a frigate (Broken up in 1780)
- San Paolo, a frigate (Sold in 1780)
- San Pio, a schooner (Bought in 1780, out of service by 1796)
- San Giovanni, a schooner (Bought in 1780, out of service by 1796)
- Capitana, a galley (non operational by 1802)
- Padrona , a galley (non operational by 1802)
- San Pio, a galley (non operational by 1802)
- San Pietro, an earlier brig broken up in 1807
- Roma, a steamer
- Immacolata Concezione (Immaculate Conception), a corvette

== See also ==
- Battle of Lepanto
- Battle of Ostia
