= Santa Maria dell'Orto =

Chiesa di Santa Maria dell'Orto
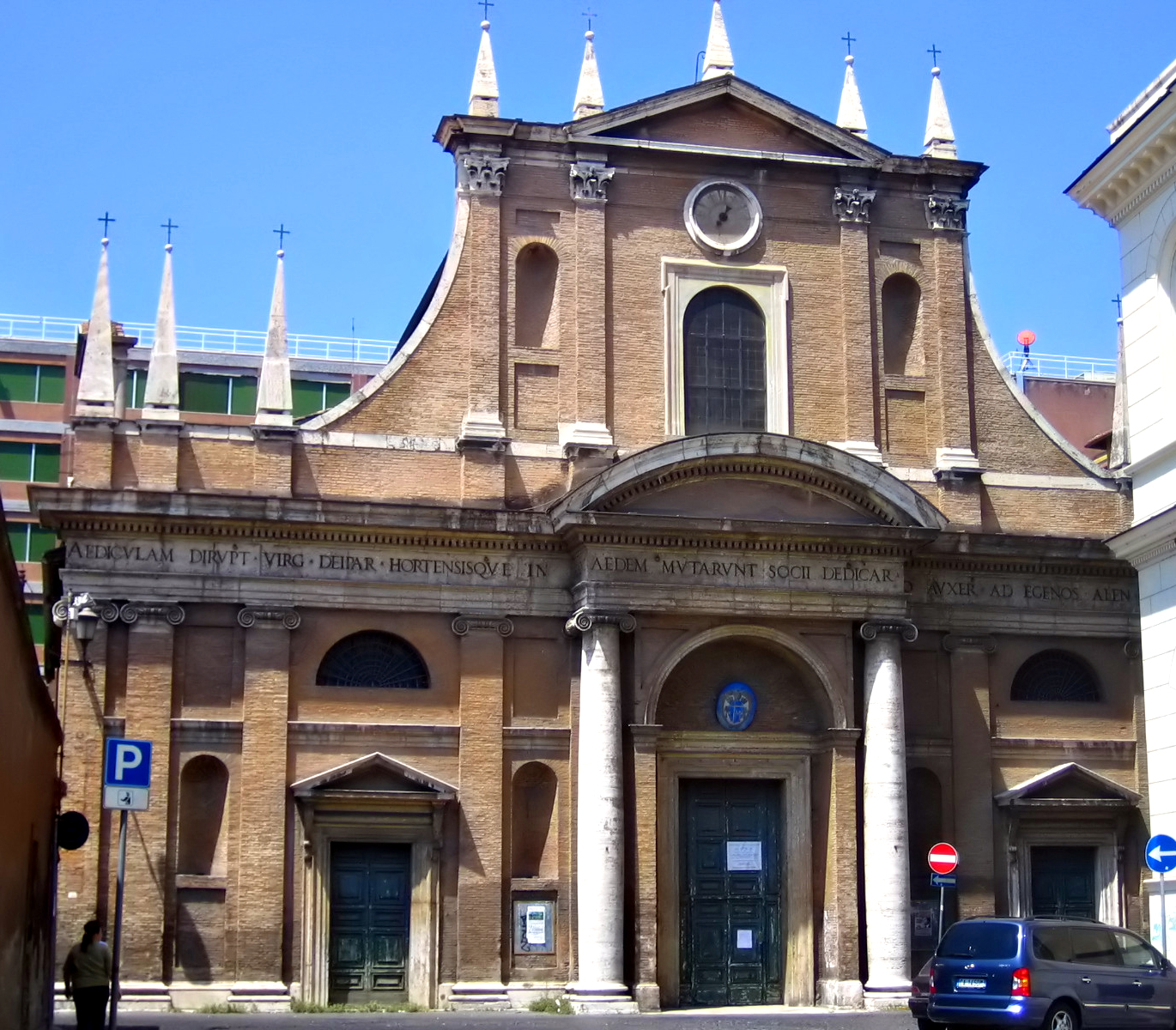
- The façade.
- Click on the map for a fullscreen view
- 41°53′13″N 12°28′30″E
- Location: Rome
- Country: Italy
- Denomination: Catholic church
- Tradition: Latin
- Website: Official website

History
- Status: Japanese national church

Architecture
- Architectural type: Church
- Style: Renaissance and Baroque
- Groundbreaking: 1489
- Completed: 1567

Administration
- District: Lazio
- Province: Rome

Santa Maria dell'Orto is a church in the Rione of Trastevere in Rome (Italy). It is the national church of Japan in Rome.

== History ==
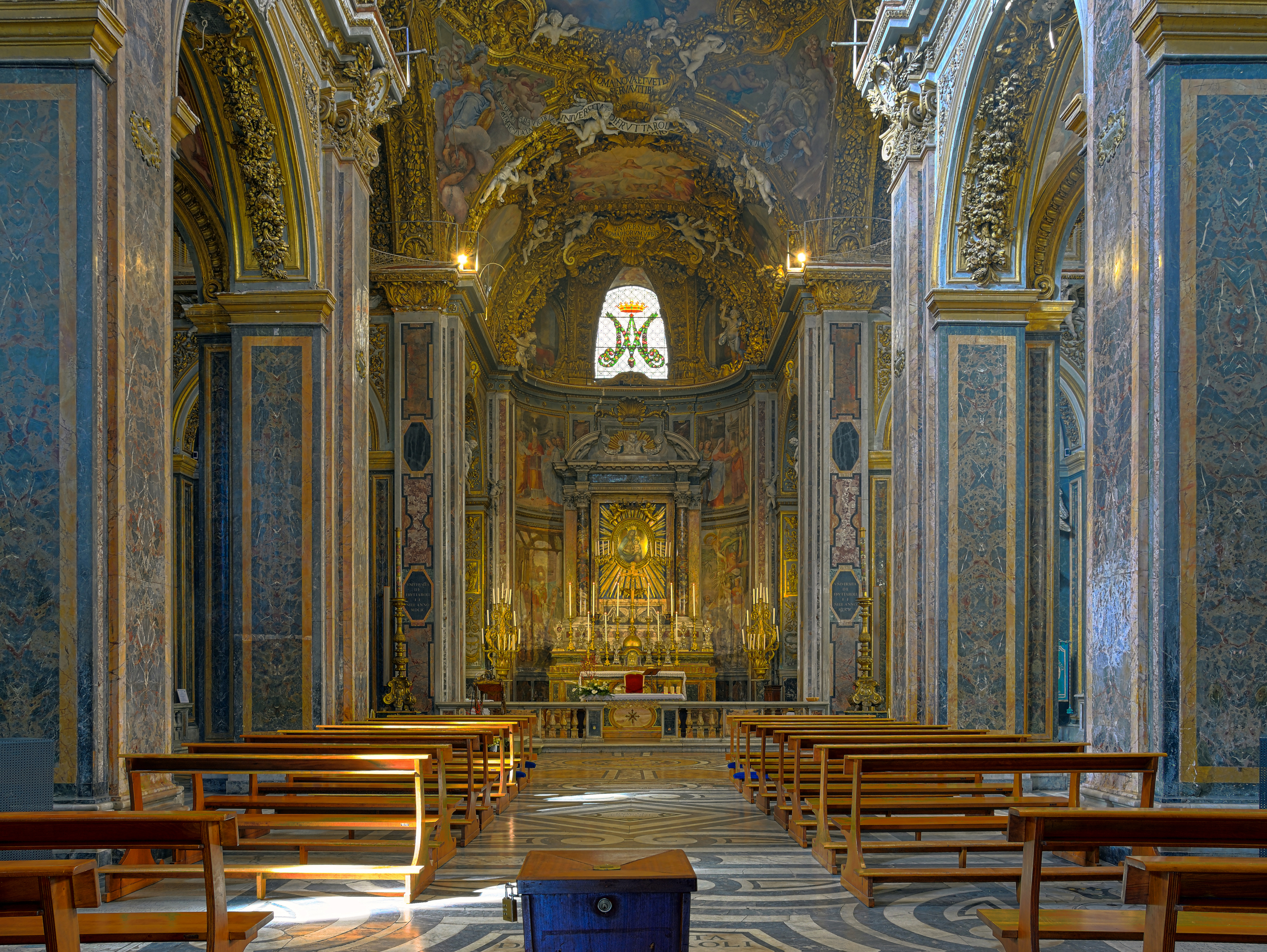
Interior

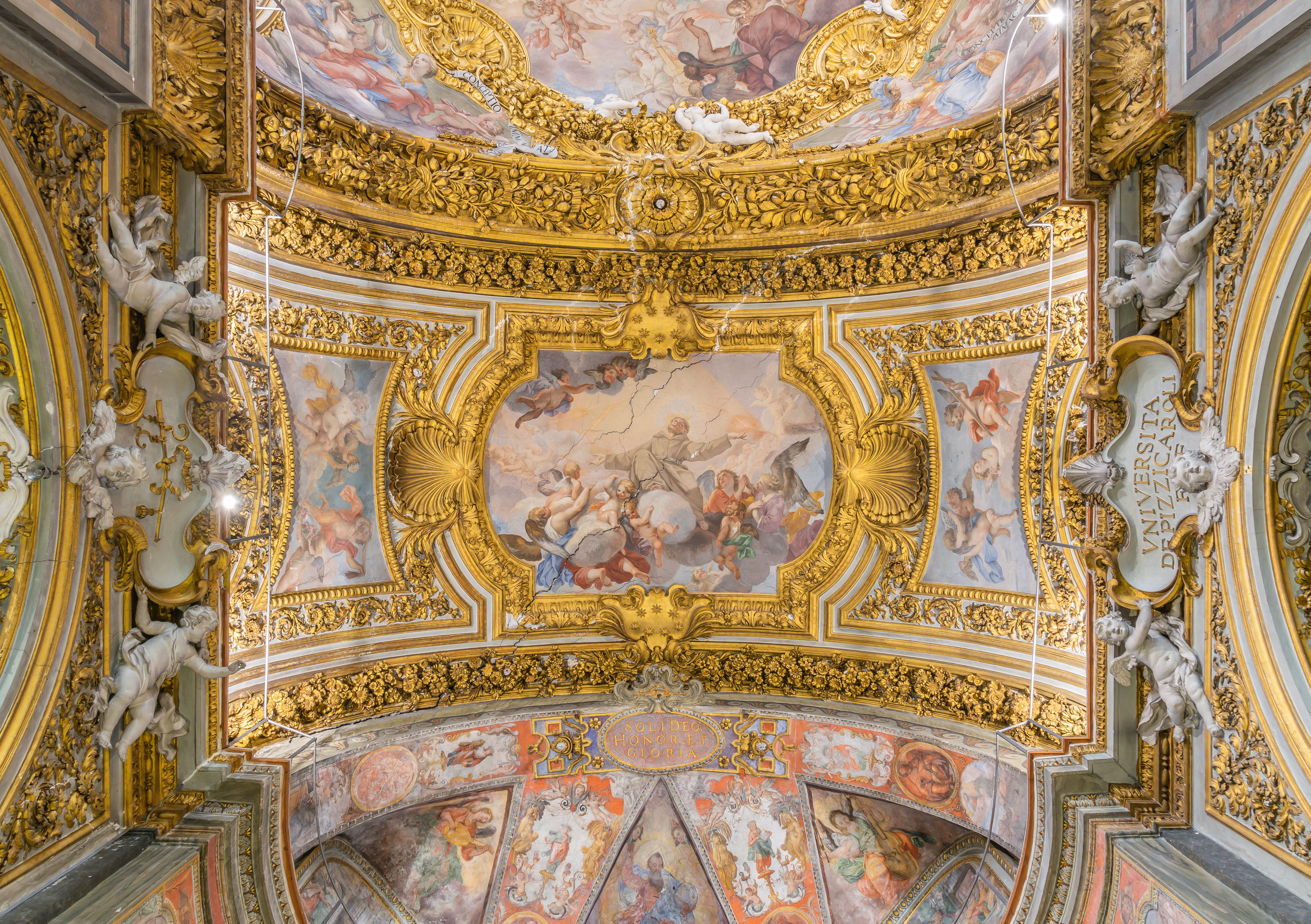
Ceiling

The church is set in the middle of the area that has been called the Prata Mucia ("Fields of Mucius") since about 508 BC; it was here that the Etruscan king Porsena had made his encampment, and that later the Roman Senate donated to Mucius Scaevola as a sign of gratitude of Rome for his heroic actions. The origins of the church are associated with a miracle that is supposed to have happened circa 1488. A sick farmer, afflicted with a serious palsy according to oral history, was healed after praying to an image of the Virgin Mary painted close to the entrance to his own market garden. The event led to popular worship for the painting, and subsequently a small votive chapel was erected, soon followed by a greater church, funded by 12 professional associations (Università). In 1492, Pope Alexander VI allowed the establishment of a confraternity and in 1588 (with a brief dated 20 March) Pope Sixtus V declared it an "archconfraternity" and bestowed on it the rare privilege of asking for the pardon of a person condemned to death, during its titular feast. During the 1825 Jubilee, it was honored with the title of Venerable.

As an archconfraternity, it could attach other confraternities, anywhere in the world; therefore, during the 1600 Jubilee – through a notary deed dated 30 April – it was aggregated to the Confraternity of the Oratory of Nostra Signora di Castello, established in Savona in 1260.

Construction was begun in 1489 by an unknown architect and completed in 1567. Its façade is largely ascribed to Vignola (though sometimes attributed to Martino Longhi the Elder), while the interior is by Guidetto Guidetti, a pupil of Michelangelo who transformed the former Greek-cross design (with four apses) into a Latin-cross structure with three naves.

The church houses works of art by the brothers Federico and Taddeo Zuccari, Corrado Giaquinto and Giovanni Baglione.

The church is still guarded by the Archconfraternity of S. Maria dell'Orto that, due to the seniority of its papal establishment, is the most ancient of the Confraternities consecrated to the Holy Virgin still active in Rome, and one of the first overall.

=== The port, the Università and the Confraternity ===
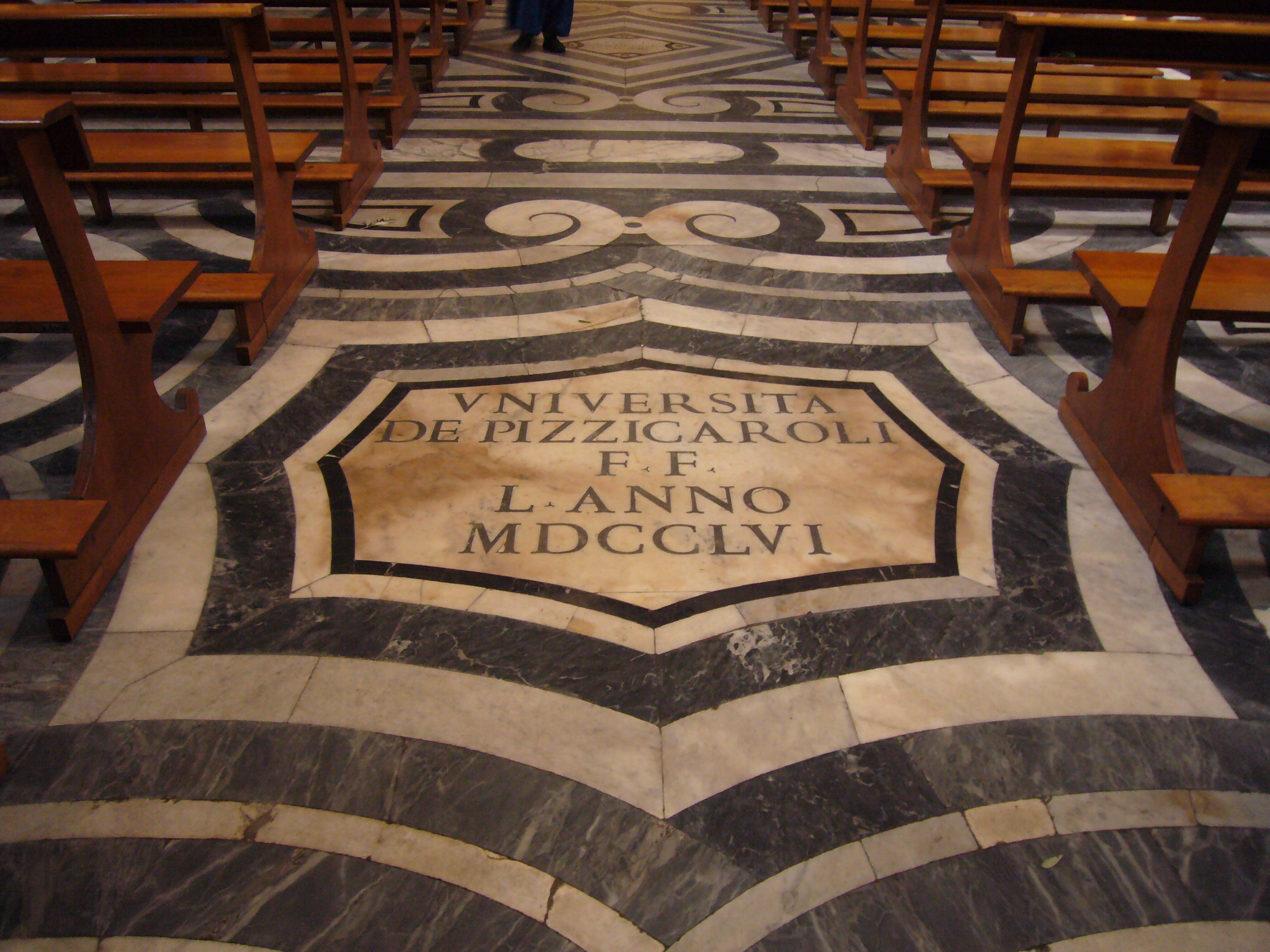
Title stone of the Università of the Pizzicaroli ("Grocers"), 1756

The area around the church was used for farming and trading - mainly wholesale - until the end of the 19th century. Due to its position on the margin of the walls, not far from Porta Portese and close to the Port of Ripa Grande, it had great commercial importance, and the church became a reference point for the professional associations involved in the food supply of the town and of the ships from and to Ostia through the Tiber: foodstuffs producers and merchants, as well as brokers and service suppliers. The Archconfraternity, which was also open to women, gathered 13 Università (the Roman equivalent of the guilds), showing the economic significance of the area:

- the Grocers and Greengrocers (the founders);
- the Fruit sellers;
- the Agents of Ripa (brokers of local trades);
- the Millers (the mills on the Tiber had a great importance for flour supply);
- the Vermicellari (producers of pasta);
- the Chicken-sellers;
- the Cobblers;
- the Winemakers;
- the Young men (shop boys and navvies belonging to various universities).

(The term Università comes from the Latin universitas - that means "union", "association" - with the more specific meaning of "aggregation of all men practicing the same activity").

=== Relationship with the Japanese community ===
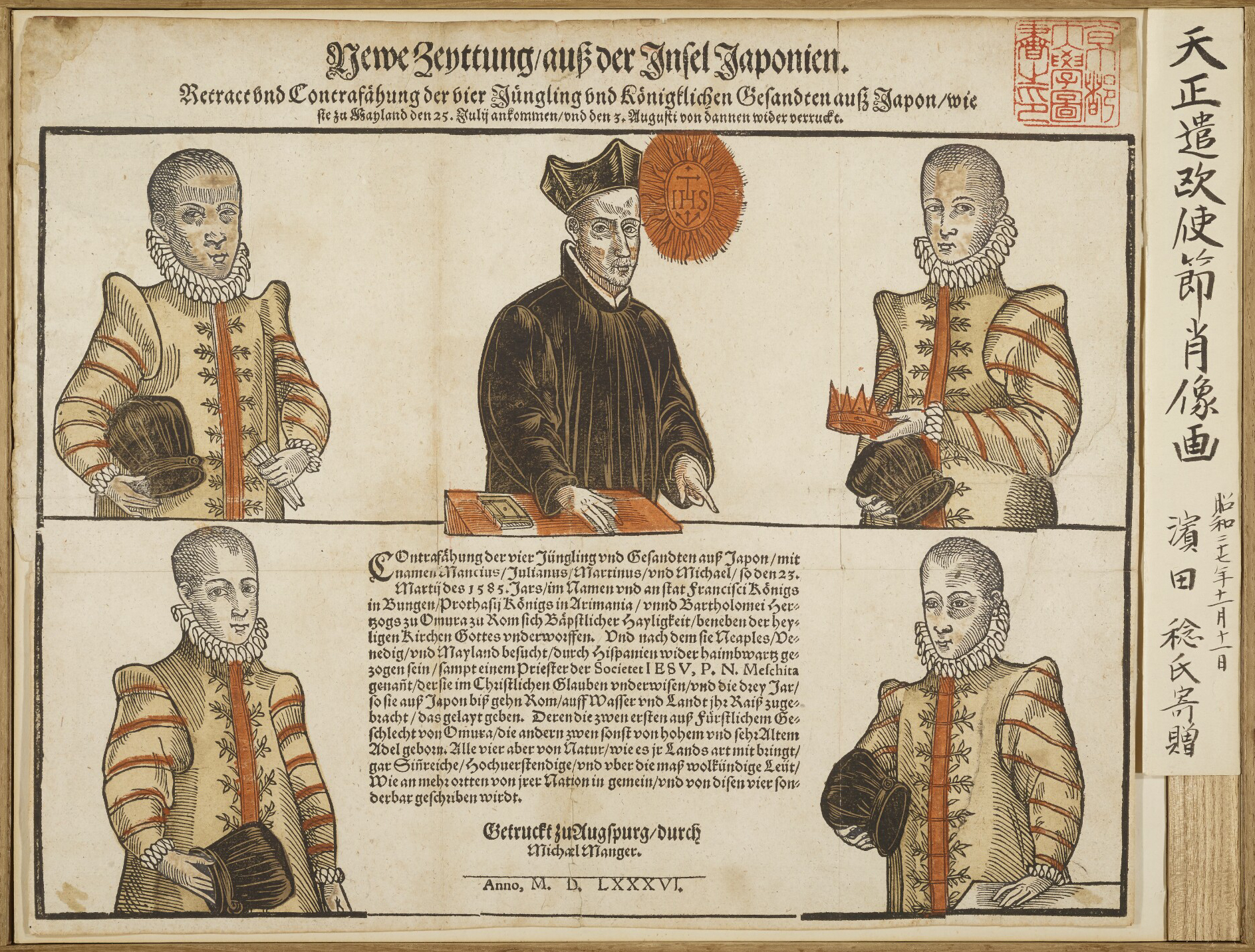
The 1585 Japanese mission; the first in the upper left is Julião Nakaura

The church is also the reference church for the Catholic Japanese community of Rome.

The relationship between the Japanese community and the church has an ancient origin: a Japanese mission ("Tenshō embassy"), consisting of four dignitaries, came to Rome in 1585 to meet the Pope. One of the feasts, thrown in honour of the guests who had come from such a distance, consisted of a sailing on Tiber from the Port of Ripa Grande to Ostia, which should have been followed by a feast on the sea with musicians and singers. But a storm rose and everybody dreaded for his life. So they implored the Virgin of the church that they had visited before leaving, and the storm calmed down. The event gave rise to the tradition of a sung Mass that is celebrated on 8 June (the anniversary day), with the attendance of delegates from the Japan Embassy in the Holy See and from the Japanese community in Rome (source: Enrico Pucci). Since 2007, in order to guarantee a better exposure, the event is commemorated during the Titular Holiday.

In October 2009, a portrait of Giuliano (Julião) Nakaura – one of the four ambassadors, who suffered martyrdom in 1633 and was beatified in 2008 – was placed in the church.

The pro tempore Ambassador of Japan in the Holy See is traditionally honored with the office of Warden of Honour of the association.

== Worship and celebrations ==
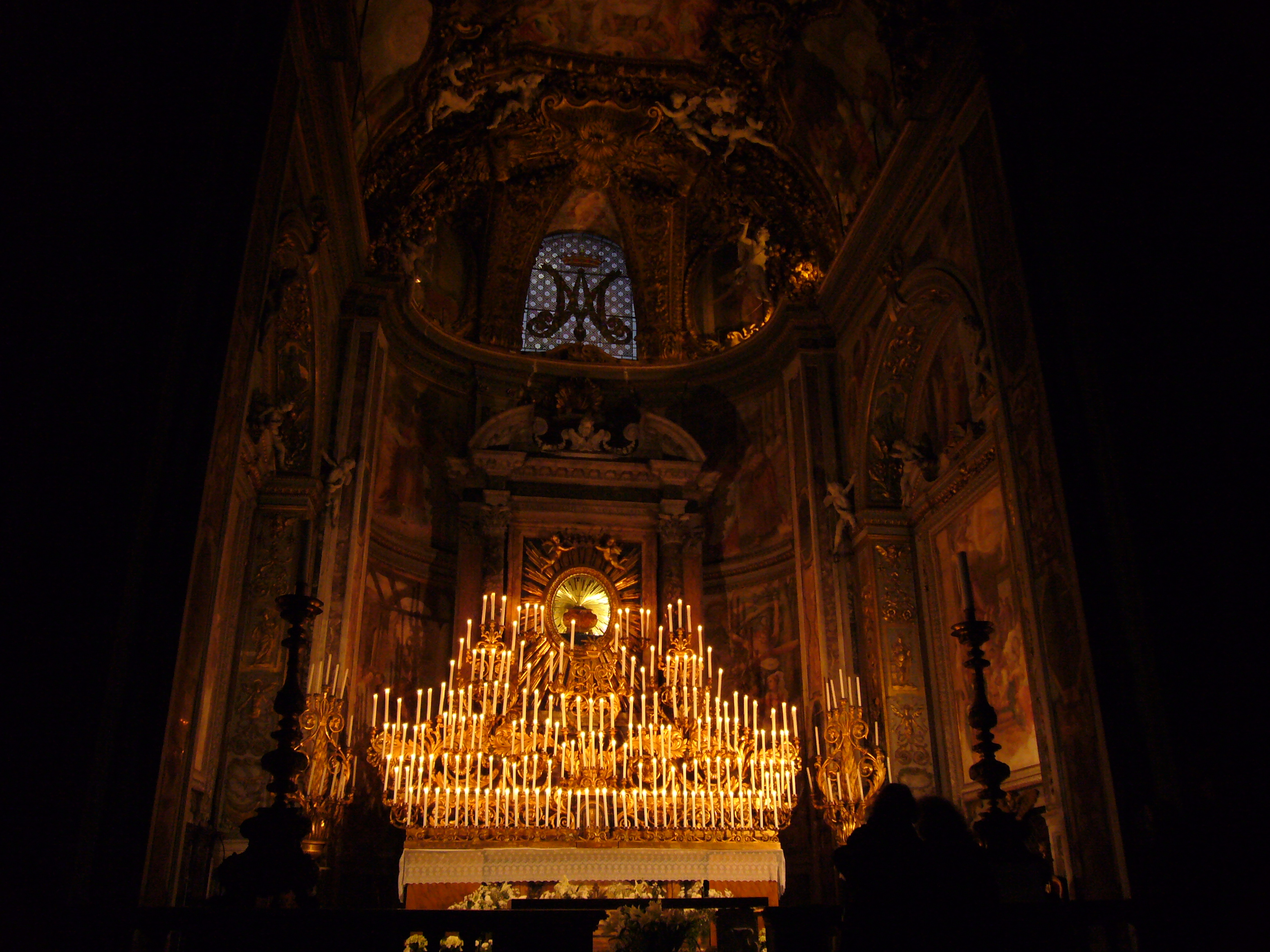
The "Macchina delle Quarant'Ore" (2008)

Worship is celebrated on Sundays and on the other feasts of precept at 11 a.m.

In the evening of Holy Thursday, the monumental Macchina delle Quarant'Ore ("Machine of the Forty Hours") is set up: it is a 19th-century structure based upon a 17th-century design, with floral decorations, made of carved and gilt wood on which more than two hundred candles are placed, so as to illuminate the mystical dark. It is perhaps the last structure of this kind still used in Italy.

The Titular Holiday of Saint Mary dell'Orto falls on the third Sunday of October. During the suggestive ceremony, blessed apples are distributed to the faithful, both in remembrance of the former Fruttaroli ("fruit sellers") guild, that gave a significant contribution to the artistic treasures of the church, and for a devotional reason: the head of the household, during the dinner, will divide the fruit into as many slices as the relatives, to symbolize "the unity into the diversity" of the Mystical Body of the Church, according to St. Paul's teaching (I Cor. – XII, 12).

== Description ==
The church is not just a sacred edifice consecrated to the Holy Virgin, but a real Marian sanctuary, full of precise symbolisms. For example, the earthly glory of Mary is depicted on the ground level, along the walls, starting from the Annunciation through all the other episodes of her life (Nativity, Presentation at the Temple, Marriage, Visitation, Flight into Egypt and so on). Her heavenly glory (Conception, Assumption, Crowning), on the other hand, is celebrated in the vaults forming the “sky” of the church. Further interesting symbolic elements can be observed in the ornaments that surround the six windows of the middle nave. Such openings let the light to burst into the church with all its brightness and to enlighten it with the rays of sunshine, an image mirroring the light of Faith descending to dispel the darkness of sin. Similarly, Christ, the Light of the World, has revealed himself through Mary, and therefore the six windows bear decorations that refer to her. Each window is surmounted by a golden plaster shell, containing a symbol, and stands above a festoon. The first window on the right side brings a door in the middle of the shell and the writing Felix coeli porta into the festoon; the second one, a sun on the top and a steelyard into the festoon; the third one, a star on the top and the writing Maris stella into the festoon. The first window on the left side brings a tower on the top and the writing Iter para tutum above; the second one, a moon on the top and a steelyard above; the third one, an ark on the top and the writing Foederis arca above.

The reading key of such ornamental complex is as simple as admirable. The Tower, the Ark, the Door and the Star are attributes that can be found into the Litany of Loreto, while the mottoes above – except Foederis arca – are taken from the verses of the ancient Marian hymn Ave Maris Stella. The windows in the middle bear no writings, but just a steelyard, the attentive emblem of the Università of the Pizzicaroli (Grocers), that financed the stuccoes. The shells show a sun and a moon facing on the opposite sides or, if you will, alternating each other in the infinite cycle of days and nights. With regards to light, the reference to the two grand lamps of heaven (Genesis I, 14 et seq.) could not be omitted; the same lamps that St. Ambrose called the eyes of sky and lighthouses of the world (Hexameron). Indeed, according to the theological symbology of the Church, Mary is the Moon, reflecting the light of the Sun, that is Christ. The divine light thus can spread over the world, as men could not directly receive such a brilliant light without being dazzled: the mildness and sweetness of the Virgin are an indispensable mediation. For this reason, into the religious iconography Mary is often portrayed wrapped up into a blue, star-adorned mantle and with the feet lying on a crescent moon. A Marian value can also be found into the little and big shells scattered all around the Assumption painted by Giacinto Calandrucci on the central vault. Just to make a single example among the others, a protochristian text quoted by John Damascene – the Physiologus – gives a further confirmation to the vast iconography, according to which Mary is the mirable instrument by which mankind could receive the Savior: The divine lightning has penetrated into the purest shell, into Mary, the mother of God, and a valuable pearl has born.

== The church and the cinema ==
The church, due to its majestic aspect, has been chosen as a set for many movies: above all, in 1945 various scenes of the famous Rome, Open City by Roberto Rossellini were filmed here, and more precisely the ones showing the interior of the church, whose vicar is don Pietro (performed by Aldo Fabrizi), while the external location was the church of S. Elena.

The parvis of the church also appears in an episode of I mostri (1963) by Dino Risi.

One of the latest movies is Giovanna's Father (2007), directed by Pupi Avati.

== Bibliography ==
- Enrico Pucci - Maria SS. dell'Orto in Trastevere e la sua venerabile Arciconfraternita; by the Archconfraternity; Rome, 2006
- Liliana Barroero – S. Maria dell'Orto – Istituto di Studi Romani; Collana “Chiese di Roma illustrate”; Roma, 1976
- Laura Gigli – Rione XIII/Trastevere – Parte Quarta; F.lli Palombi Editori – Collection “Guide rionali di Roma”; Rome, 1987
- Luciano Zeppegno and Roberto Mattonelli, La chiese di Roma, Rome, Newton Compton Editore, 1996, ISBN 88-7983-238-7
- Bruno Forastieri, La devota pratica delle Quarant'Ore e l'antica "macchina" di S. Maria dell'Orto in Trastevere, 2010
- Domenico Rotella - Piccolo dizionario di S. Maria dell'Orto/Cinque secoli di tradizioni romane - Rome, Aracne Editrice, 2012
