= Arsenal of Civitavecchia =

The Arsenal of Civitavecchia is a now destroyed naval arsenal which was commissioned by Pope Alexander VII to house the fleet of the Papal Navy. It was built between 1660 and 1663 and designed by the famed baroque architect and sculptor Gianlorenzo Bernini. It was located on the site of the ancient Roman port of Centum Cellae in Civitavecchia close to Rome itself. The structure was mistakenly destroyed in 1944 in an Allied bombing raid during World War II, along with most of the surrounding port area.

The Arsenal is depicted in the 1668 painting "The Bernini Arsenal at Civitavecchia" by Viviano Codazzi and Filippo Lauri which it has been suggested may have been commissioned by a member of Pope Alexander VII's family, the House of Chigi (or the Pope himself) to celebrate the arsenal's completion. In the painting, the front facade of the arsenal's building bears the Pope's seal.
