= Piazza di Pietra =

Square in Rome, Italy

- Square
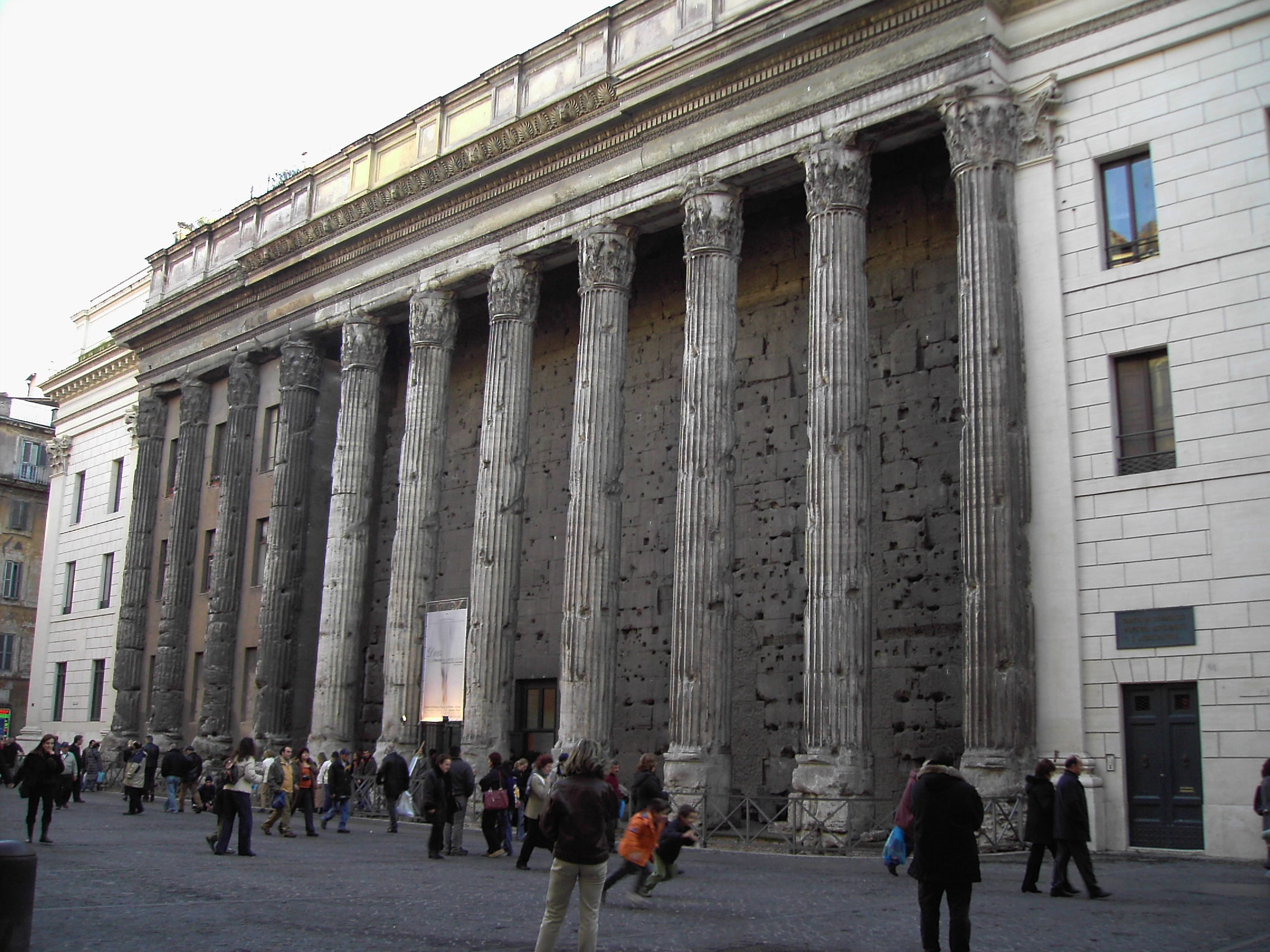
- Location: Rome, Italy
- Interactive map of Piazza di Pietra

Piazza di Pietra is a square in Rome, Italy.
