= Sant'Eustachio (rione of Rome) =

Coordinates: 41°53′54″N 12°28′32″E

- Rione of Rome
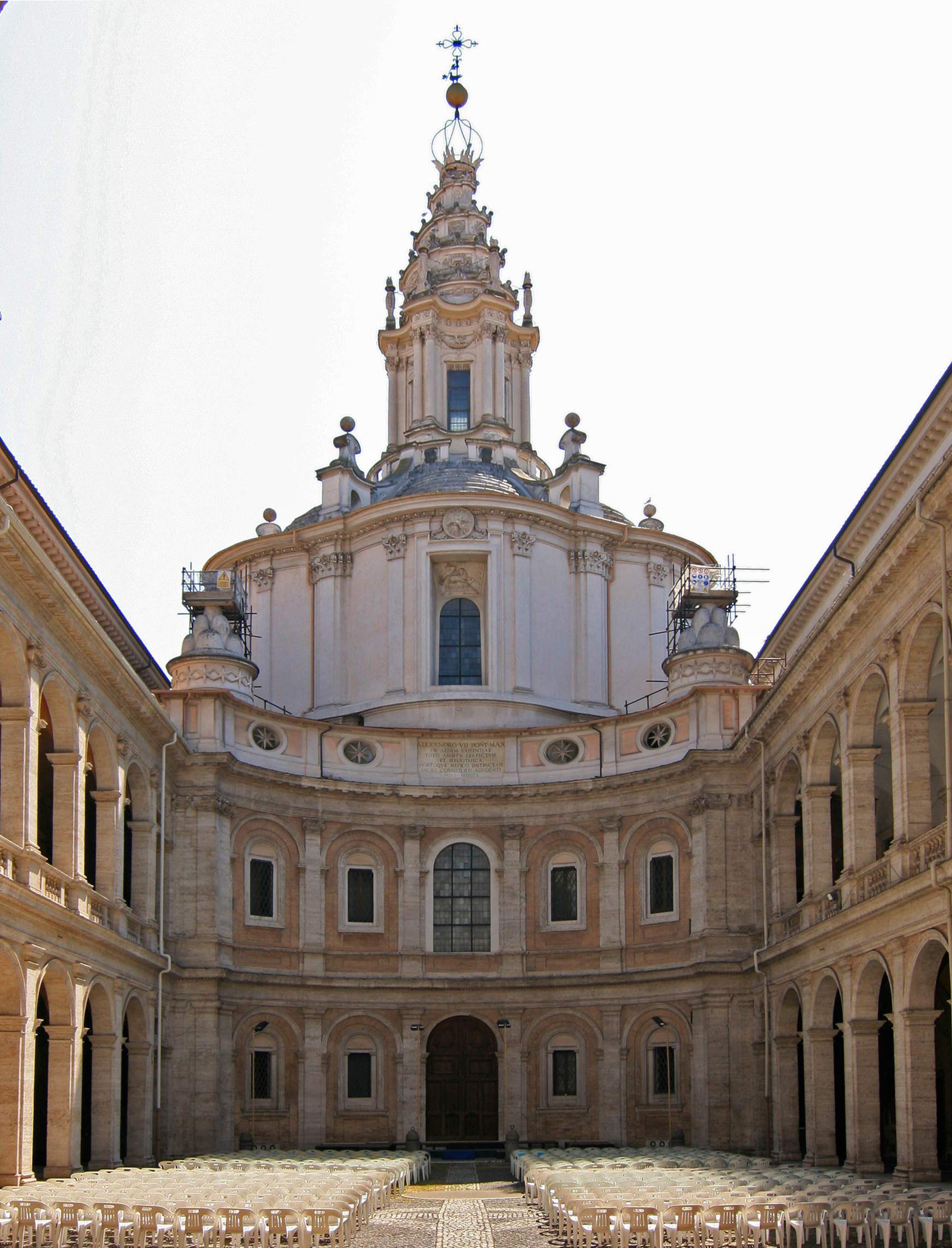
- Sant'Ivo alla Sapienza

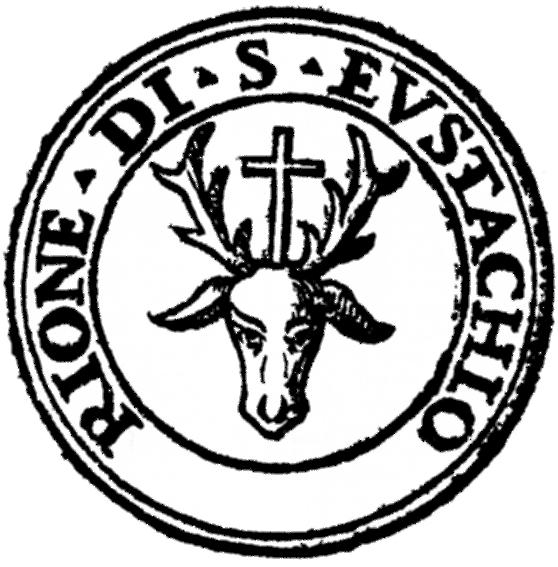
- Seal

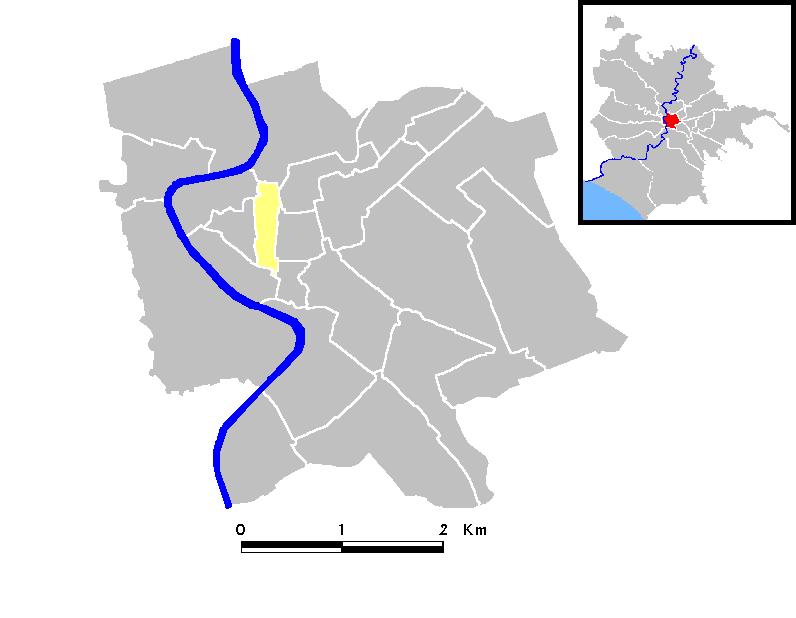
- Position of the rione within the center of the city
- Country: Italy
- Region: Lazio
- Province: Rome
- Comune: Rome
- Time zone: UTC+1 (CET)
  - Summer (DST): UTC+2 (CEST)

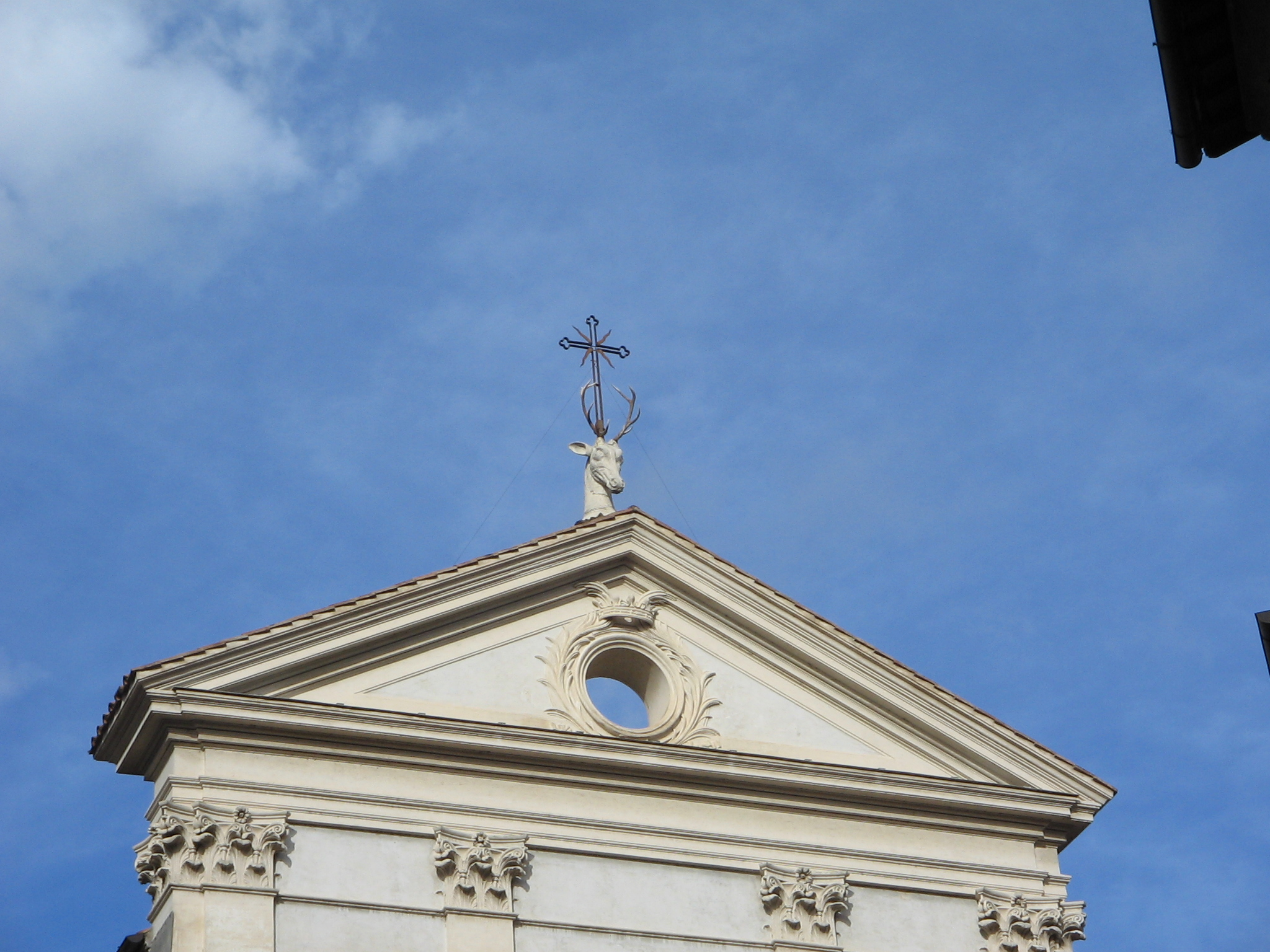
The head of the deer on the top of the church of Sant'Eustachio

Sant'Eustachio (Italian: [santeuˈstaːkjo]) is the 8th rione of Rome, Italy, identified by the initials R. VIII. It is named after the eponymous church and is located within the Municipio I.

Its coat of arms depicts the head of a stag with a cross between the antlers, symbol of Saint Eustace: the figure is golden on a red background.

== Geography ==
Northward, Sant'Eustachio borders with Campo Marzio (R. IV), whose boundary is defined by Piazza in Campo Marzio, Via della Stelletta and Via dei Portoghesi. It also borders with Ponte, from which is separated by Via dei Pianellari, Piazza di Sant'Agostino, Via di Sant'Agostino and Piazza delle Cinque Lune.

To the west, the rione borders with Parione (R. VI), from which is separated by Piazza delle Cinque Lune, Corso del Rinascimento, Corso Vittorio Emanuele II, Largo dei Chiavari and Via dei Chiavari.

Southward, Sant'Eustachio borders with Regola (R. VII), the boundary being outlined by Via dei Giubbonari, Piazza Benedetto Cairoli, Via Arenula and Via di Santa Maria del Pianto; as well as with Sant'Angelo (R. XI), from which is separated by Via in Publicolis, Via dei Falegnami, Via di Sant'Elena and Largo Arenula.

Eastward, it borders with Pigna (R. IX), the boundary being defined by Largo Arenula, Via di Torre Argentina, Piazza di Santa Chiara and Via della Rotonda; and with Colonna (R. III), whose border is marked by Piazza della Rotonda, Via del Pantheon, Piazza della Maddalena and Via della Maddalena.

== Places of interest ==
=== Palaces and other buildings ===
- Palazzo Baldassini, in Via delle Coppelle.
- Palazzetto del Burcardo, in Via del Sudario.
- Palazzo Giustiniani, in Via della Dogana Vecchia.
- Palazzo Maccarani Stati, in Piazza di Sant'Eustachio.
- Palazzo Madama, in Piazza Madama, seat of the Italian Senate.
- Palazzo Vidoni-Caffarelli, in Corso Vittorio Emanuele II.
- Palazzo della Sapienza, in Corso del Rinascimento, seat of the Central Archives of Rome.
- Teatro Valle, in Via del Teatro Valle.

=== Churches ===
- Sant'Eustachio
- Sant'Agostino in Campo Marzio
- Sant'Andrea della Valle
- Santi Benedetto e Scolastica
- Sant'Ivo alla Sapienza
- San Luigi dei Francesi
- San Salvatore alle Coppelle
- Santa Maria in Publicolis
- Santissimo Sudario all'Argentina
- San Giuliano dei Fiamminghi
- Santa Maria in Monterone
- San Carlo ai Catinari

=== Other ===
- Abbot Luigi
- Fontana dei Libri
