= Palazzo Pio =

Palazzo Pio may refer to the following buildings in Rome, Italy:

- Palazzo Orsini Pio Righetti, in the Parione district
- Palazzo Pio (Borgo), in Via della Conciliazione, a property of the Holy See
