= National churches in Rome =

Designation of certain churches in Rome

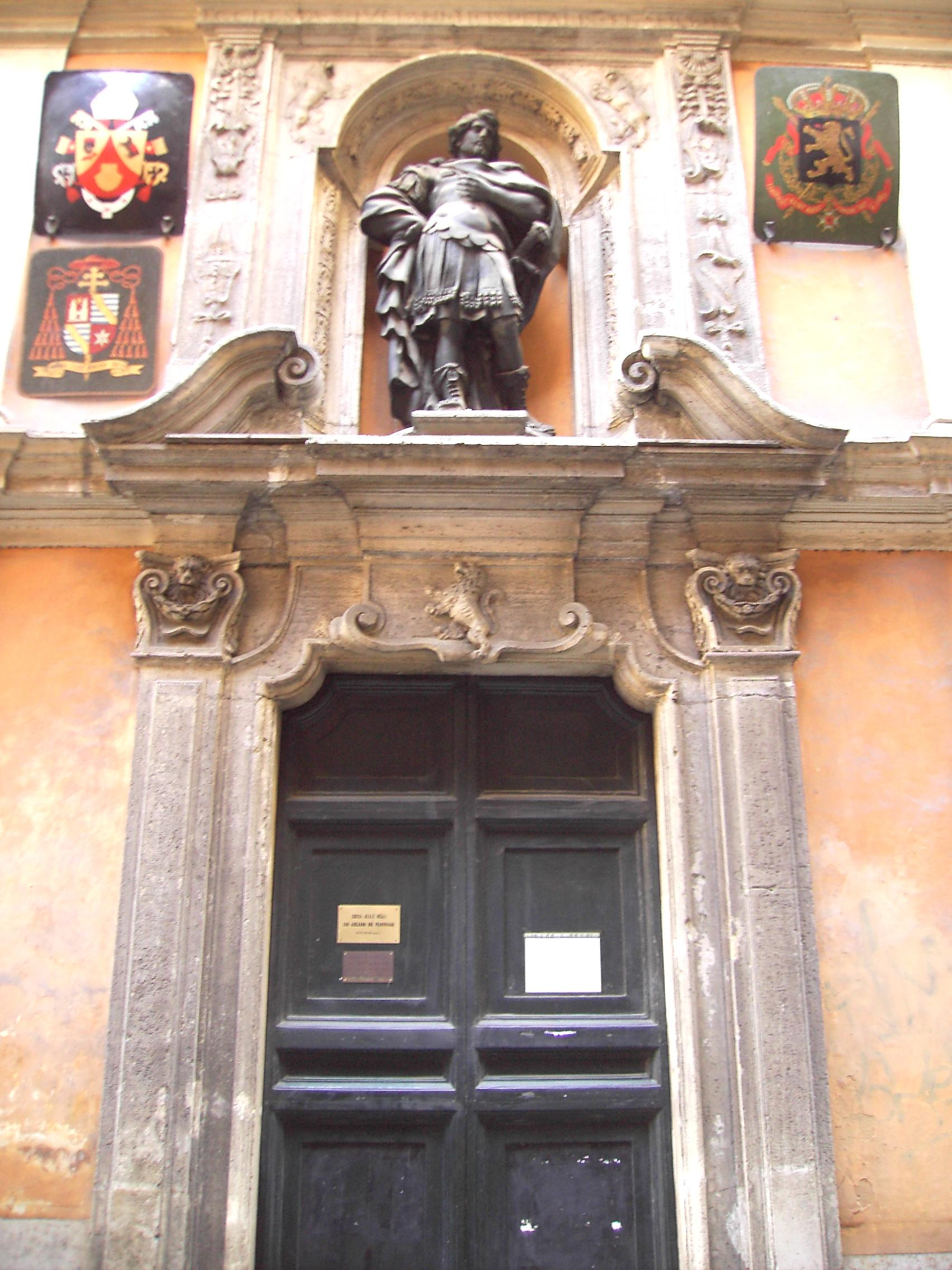
Door of San Giuliano dei Fiamminghi: Arms of Pope Benedict XVI and arms of titular bishop (Jan Pieter Schotte) on the left, arms of Belgium on the right, marking it as the Belgian national church.

Charitable institutions attached to churches in Rome were founded right through the medieval period and included hospitals, hostels, and others providing assistance to pilgrims to Rome from a certain "nation", which thus became these nations' national churches in Rome (Italian: chiese nazionali). These institutions were generally organized as confraternities and funded through charity and legacies from rich benefactors belonging to that "nation". Often, they were also connected to national scholæ (ancestors of Rome's seminaries), where the clergymen of that nation were trained. The churches and their riches were a sign of the importance of their nation and of the prelates that supported them. Up to 1870 and Italian unification, these national churches also included churches of the Italian states (now called "regional churches").

Many of these organizations, lacking a purpose by the 19th century, were expropriated through the 1873 legislation on the suppression of religious corporations. In the following decades, nevertheless, various accords – ending up in the Lateran Pacts – saw the national churches' assets returned to the Catholic Church.

== Italian regional churches ==
- Abruzzo: Santa Maria Maddalena in Campo Marzio
- Apulia: San Nicola in Carcere
- Basilicata: San Nicola in Carcere
- Calabria: San Francesco di Paola ai Monti
- Campania: Santo Spirito dei Napoletani
- Dalmatian Italians: San Marco Evangelista in Agro Laurentino
- Emilia-Romagna: Santi Giovanni Evangelista e Petronio dei Bolognesi
- Istrian Italians: San Marco Evangelista in Agro Laurentino
- Lazio:

- Sant'Ignazio di Loyola in Campo Marzio
- Santa Maria in Ara Coeli (Rome)
- Santissimo Nome di Gesù all'Argentina

- Liguria: San Giovanni Battista dei Genovesi
- Lombardy:

- Santi Ambrogio e Carlo al Corso
- Santi Bartolomeo e Alessandro a Piazza Colonna (Bergamo)

- Marche: San Salvatore in Lauro
- Piedmont: Santissimo Sudario all'Argentina
- Sardinia: Santissimo Sudario all'Argentina
- Sicily: Santa Maria Odigitria al Tritone
- Tuscany:

- Basilica di San Giovanni Battista dei Fiorentini (Florence)
- San Giovanni Battista Decollato
- Santa Croce e San Bonaventura alla Pilotta (Lucca)
- Santa Caterina da Siena a Via Giulia (Siena)

- Umbria:

- Santi Benedetto e Scholastica (Norcia)
- Santa Rita da Cascia alle Vergini

- Venetia: San Marco Evangelista al Campidoglio

== National churches ==
=== Africa ===
- Democratic Republic of the Congo: Natività di Gesu
- Eritrea:

- San Tommaso in Parione

- Ethiopia:

- Santo Stefano degli Abissini
- San Tommaso in Parione

=== Americas ===
- Argentina: Santa Maria Addolorata a Piazza Buenos Aires
- Canada: Nostra Signora del Santissimo Sacramento e Santi Martiri Canadesi
- Chile: Santa Maria della Pace
- Ecuador: Santa Maria in Via
- Mexico: Nostra Signora di Guadalupe e San Filippo Martire
- Peru: Sant'Anastasia al Palatino
- United States of America:

- San Patrizio a Villa Ludovisi
- Santa Susanna alle Terme di Diocleziano (former)

- Venezuela: Nostra Signora di Coromoto

=== Asia ===
- Armenia

- Santa Maria Egiziaca (deconsecrated)
- San Biagio della Pagnotta
- San Nicola da Tolentino agli Orti Sallustiani

- Japan: Santa Maria dell'Orto
- Lebanon: San Marone
- Philippines: Santa Pudenziana
- Syria: Santa Maria della Concezione in Campo Marzio

=== Europe ===
- Albania:

- San Giovanni della Malva in Trastevere
- Sant'Atanasio a Via del Babuino (Græco-Byzantine rite)

- Austria:

- Santa Maria dell'Anima
- Santa Maria della Pietà in Camposanto dei Teutonici

- Belgium: San Giuliano dei Fiamminghi
- Croatia:

- San Girolamo dei Croati
- San Marco Evangelista in Agro Laurentino (Dalmatia and Istria)

- Denmark: Santa Maria in Traspontina
- England:

- San Silvestro in Capite
- San Tommaso di Canterbury
- San Giorgio e Martiri Inglesi

- France:

- Santissima Trinità dei Monti
- San Luigi dei Francesi
- Sant'Ivo dei Bretoni (Brittany)
- Santi Claudio e Andrea dei Borgognoni (Burgundy)
- San Nicola dei Lorenesi (Lorraine)
- San Crisogono (Corsica)

- Germany:

- Santa Maria dell'Anima
- Santa Maria della Pietà in Camposanto dei Teutonici
- Santo Spirito in Sassia

- Greece:

- San Basilio agli Orti Sallustiani (Græco-Byzantine rite)
- Santa Maria in Cosmedin (Græco-Melkite rite)
- San Teodoro al Palatino (Eastern Orthodox)

- Hungary:

- Santo Stefano Rotondo al Celio
- Santo Stefano degli Ungheresi (demolished)
- Santo Stefano in Piscinula (demolished)

- Ireland:

- Sant'Isidoro a Capo le Case
- San Clemente al Laterano
- San Patrizio a Villa Ludovisi (former)
- Santa Maria in Posterula (demolished)

- Lithuania:
  - Lietuvių koplyčia (within San Pietro in Vaticano)
  - San Casimiro a Via Tusculano
- Malta:

- Santa Maria del Priorato
- San Giovanni Battista dei Cavalieri di Rodi

- Netherlands:

- Santa Maria della Pietà in Camposanto dei Teutonici
- Santa Maria dell'Anima
- Santi Michele e Magno

- Norway: Sant'Olav (within Santi Ambrogio e Carlo al Corso)
- Poland:

- Santo Stanislao dei Polacchi
- Resurrezione di Nostro Signore Gesù Cristo

- Portugal: Sant'Antonio dei Portoghesi
- Romania: San Salvatore alle Coppelle (Byzantine-Romanian rite)
- Russia: Sant'Antonio Abate all'Esquilino
- Scotland:

- Sant'Andrea degli Scozzesi (deconsecrated)
- Il Pontificio Collegio Scozzese

- Spain:

- Nostra Signora del Sacro Cuore
- Santa Maria in Monserrato degli Spagnoli
- Santissima Trinità a Via Condotti
- San Carlino alle Quattro Fontane

- Sweden: Santa Brigida a Campo de' Fiori
- Switzerland:

- Santi Martino e Sebastiano degli Svizzeri (Note: Reserved to the Swiss Guards.)
- San Pellegrino in Vaticano

- Ukraine:

- Santi Sergio e Bacco
- San Giosafat al Gianicolo
- Santa Sofia a Via Boccea (Byzantine-Ukrainian rite)

== Bibliography ==
- Giuliani, Raffaella (1999). "The Martyr's Sanctuaries (The Catacombs)". In Gioia, Francesco (ed.). Pilgrims in Rome: the official Vatican guide for the Jubilee Year 2000. New York City: Continuum. p. 124. ISBN 0-8264-1187-8. LCCN 99029745. OCLC 41278452. OL 39835M – via Internet Archive.
- Sabatini, Carlo, ed. (1979). Le chiese nazionali a Roma [National churches in Rome] (in Italian). Rome: Istituto Poligrafico e Zecca dello Stato.
- Roma. La biblioteca di Repubblica Italia (in Italian). Vol. 2. Milan: Touring Club Italiano. 2004. OCLC 1045898482.
