= Natività di Gesù =

- Church of the Nativity of Jesus
- Chiesa della Natività di Gesù
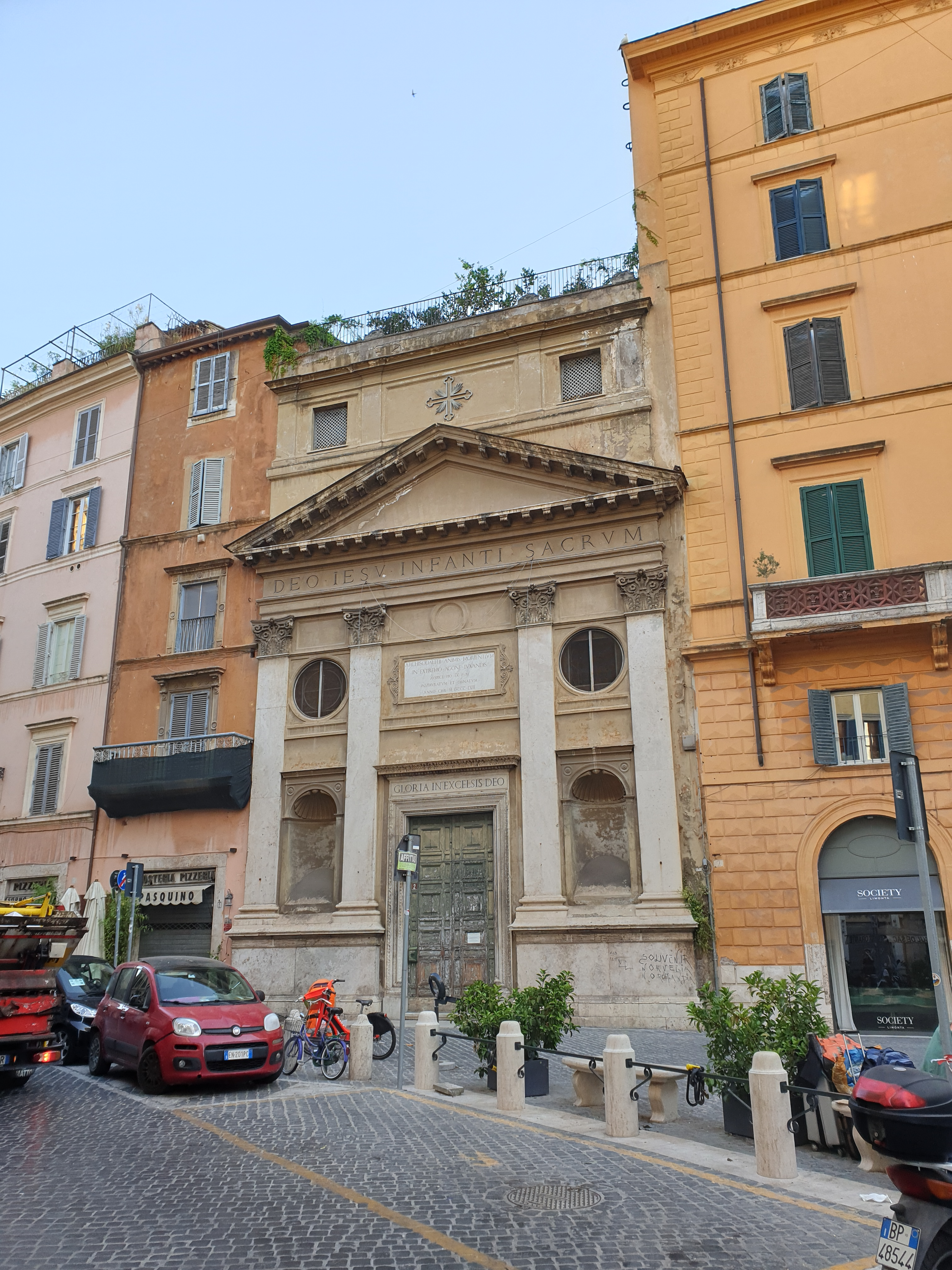
- Click on the map for a fullscreen view
- 41°53′53″N 12°28′19″E
- Location: Vicolo dei Granari 10/A, Parione, Rome
- Country: Italy
- Language: Italian
- Denomination: Catholic
- Tradition: Roman Rite

History
- Status: national church
- Dedication: Nativity of Jesus

Architecture
- Functional status: active
- Architect: Andrea Busiri Vici
- Architectural type: Renaissance Revival, Baroque
- Groundbreaking: 1692
- Completed: 1862

Administration
- Diocese: Rome

Natività di Gesù is a church on Piazza Pasquino in the Parione rione of Rome. It is the national church in Rome of the Democratic Republic of Congo.

It was built at the end of the 17th century for the Archconfraternity of the Company of the Nativity (known as the Agonizzanti), formed in 1616. Pope Innocent XII granted a letter giving the Archconfraternity the licence to build a church as its oratory. It was rebuilt several times, the last being in 1862, when it took on its current appearance.

== Bibliography ==
- C. Rendina, Le Chiese di Roma, Newton & Compton Editori, Milano 2000, p. 266
- G. Carpaneto, Rione VI Parione, in AA.VV, I rioni di Roma, Newton & Compton Editori, Milano 2000, Vol. II, pp. 384–447
