= San Giorgio e Martiri Inglesi =

- Church of Saint George and the English Martyrs
- Chiesa dei Santi Giorgio e Martiri inglesi
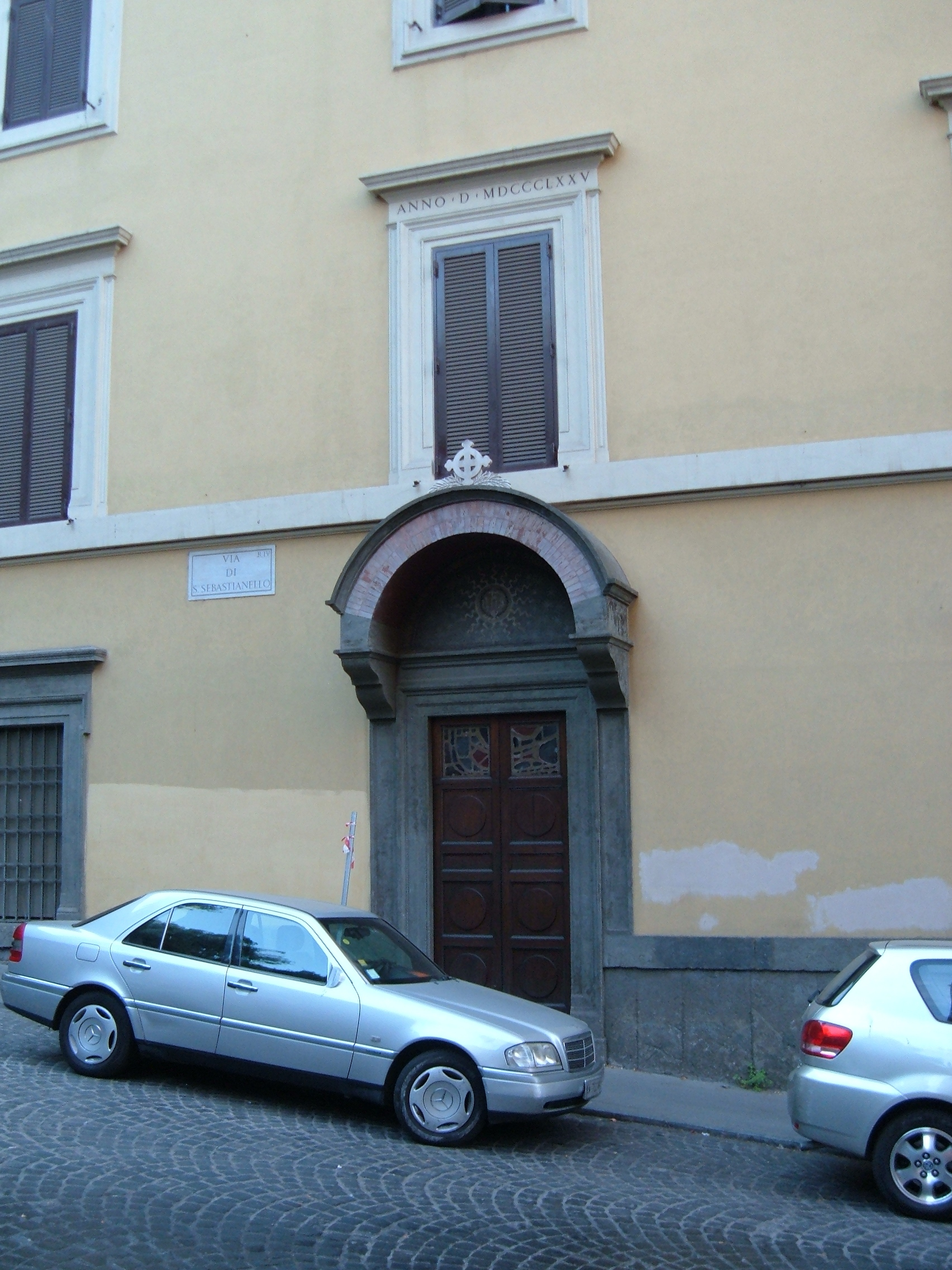
- The facade of San Giorgio e Martiri Inglesi
- Click on the map for a fullscreen view
- 41°54′23.83″N 12°28′57.51″E
- Location: Via San Sebastianello 16, Rome
- Country: Italy
- Language: English
- Denomination: Catholic
- Tradition: Roman Rite
- Religious order: Poor Servants of the Mother of God

History
- Status: national church
- Founded: 1887
- Dedication: Saint George and the English Catholic Martyrs

Architecture
- Architect: Carlo Maria Busiri Vici
- Completed: 1887

Administration
- Diocese: Rome

San Giorgio e Martiri Inglesi (St George and the English Martyrs) is a Roman Catholic church in Rome, in the rione Campo Marzio on via di San Sebastianello.

It opened on 5 November 1887, having been built thanks to a major donation by prince Alessandro Torlonia. It is now cared for by the Poor Servants of the Mother of God, an English religious congregation, which lives in the convent annex. It was built by Alexander George Fullerton in memory of the early deaths of his wife Georgiana (one of the order's founders) and their young son William.

The high altarpiece by A. Dies shows Gregory the Great. The altar originally came from the demolished church of Santa Teresa presso le Quattro Fontane and was donated by prince Torlonia. The two altars of Our Lady and of the Sacred Heart were given by Fullerton and came from another demolished church, that of Santa Elisabetta. The wall paintings are by Eugenio Cisterna.

== Bibliography ==
- Mariano Armellini, Le chiese di Roma dal secolo IV al XIX, Roma 1891, p. 344
- M. Quercioli, Rione IV Campo Marzio, in AA.VV, I rioni di Roma, Newton & Compton Editori, Milano 2000, Vol. I, pp. 310
