= Parione =

Coordinates: 41.8985°N 12.4691°E

- Rione of Rome
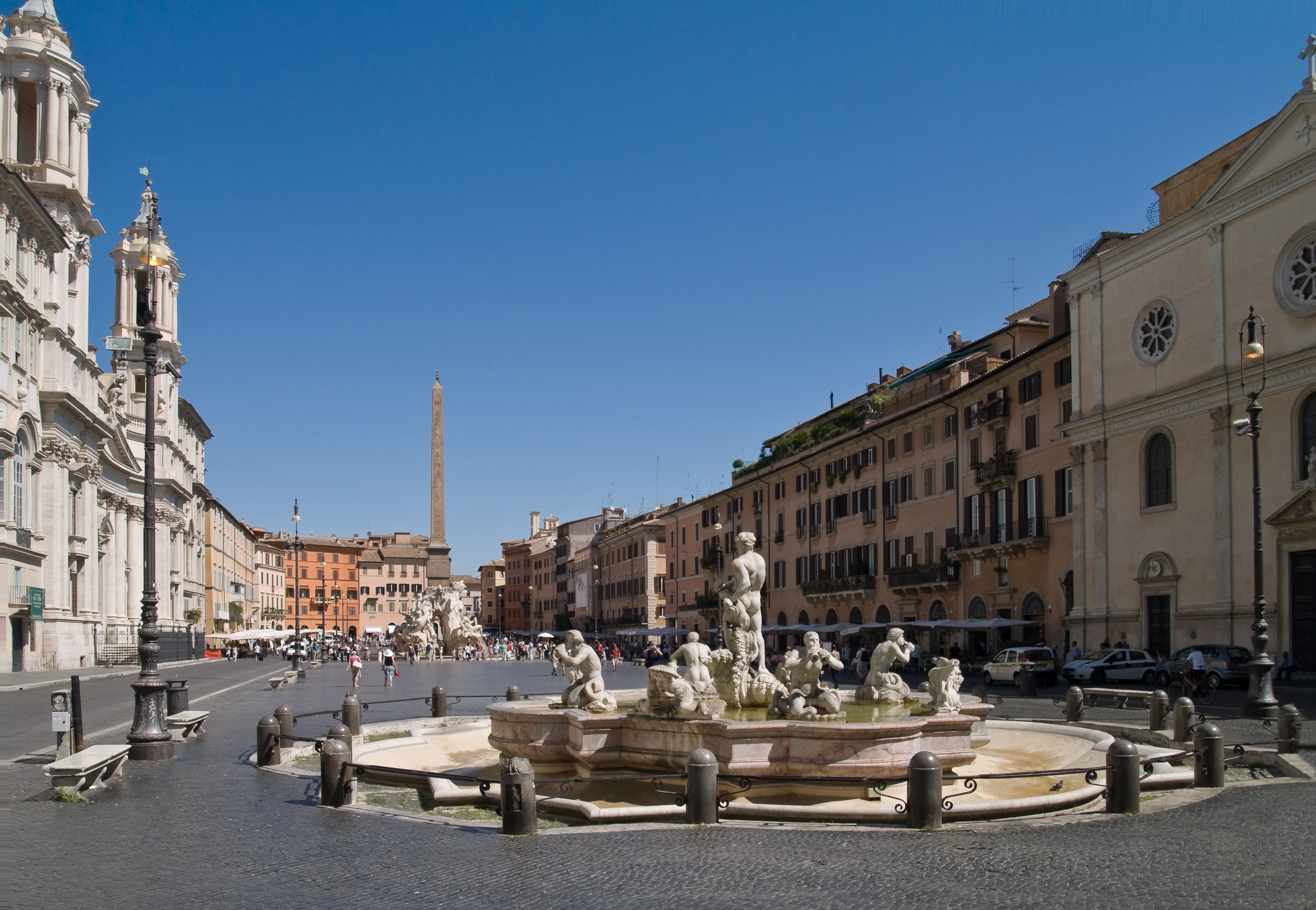
- Piazza Navona

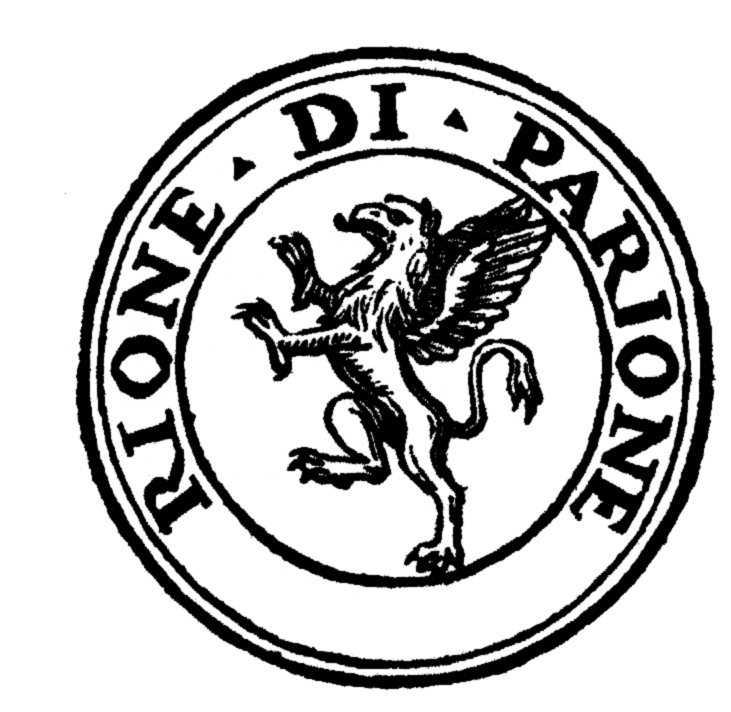
- Seal

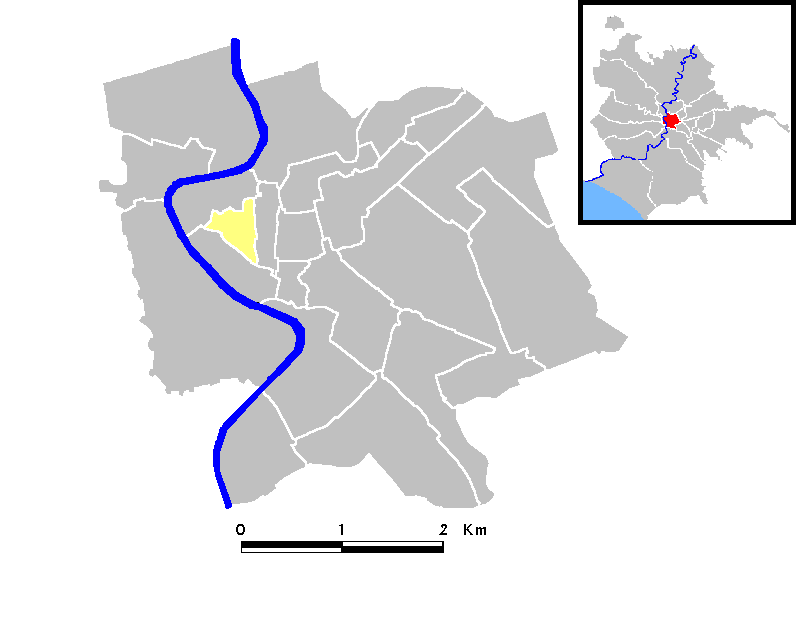
- Position of the rione within the center of the city
- Country: Italy
- Region: Lazio
- Province: Rome
- Comune: Rome
- Time zone: UTC+1 (CET)
  - Summer (DST): UTC+2 (CEST)

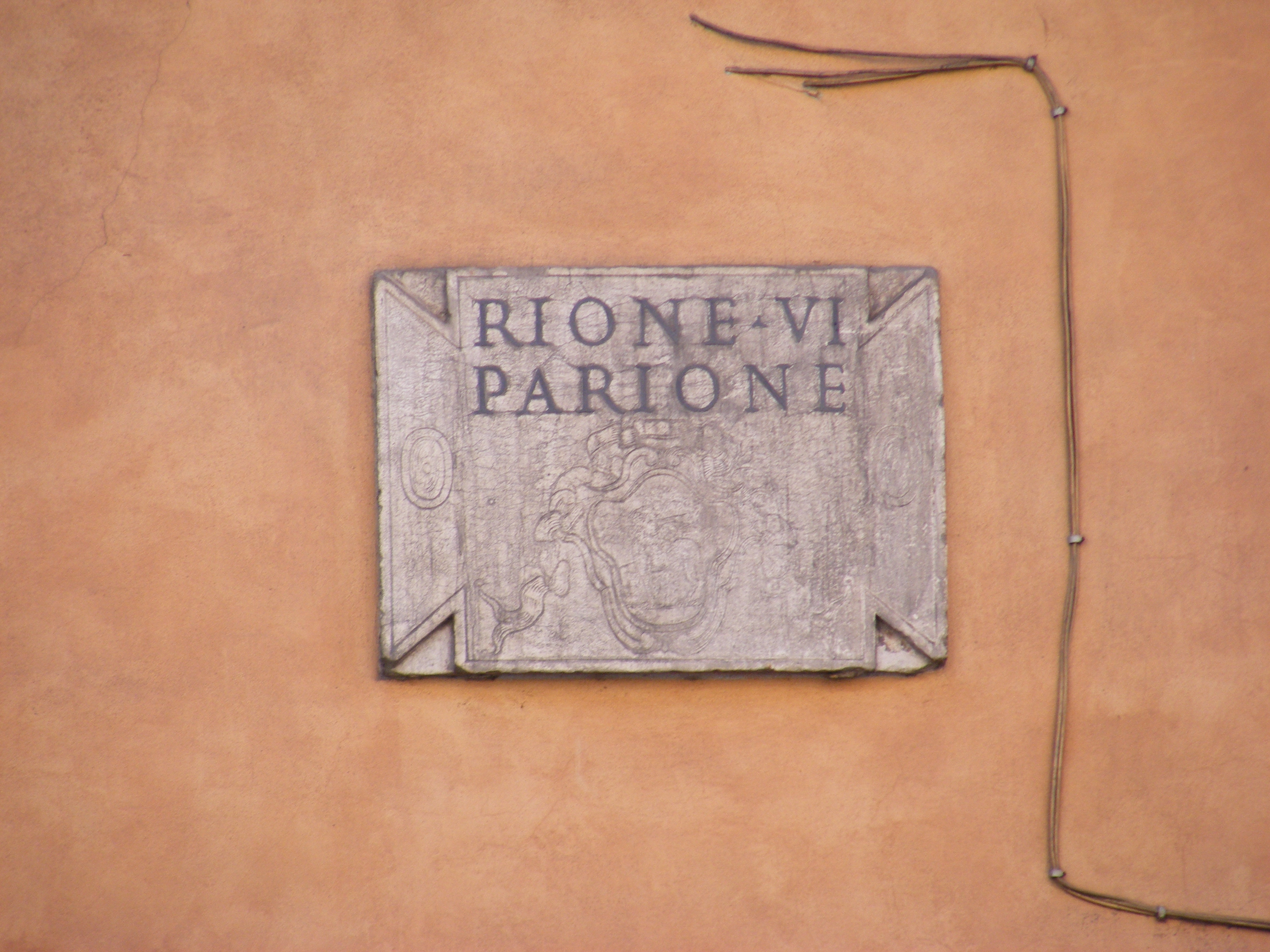
A marble plaque bearing the name of the rione

Parione is the 6th rione of Rome, Italy, identified by the initials R. VI, and belongs to the Municipio I. Its name comes from the fact that in the area there was a huge ancient wall, maybe belonging to the stadium of Domitianus; the nickname people gave to this wall was Parietone ('big wall' in ancient Italian), from which the name Parione.

The coat of arms of the rione depicts a rampant griffon, a Greek mythological creature with the head of an eagle and the body of a lion. It was chosen as a symbol of pride and nobility.

== History ==
During antiquity, it belonged to the IX Augustan region called Circus Flaminius. In this area Domitianus built his stadium and an Odeon (Odeum in Latin), for musical and poetic competitions. Pompey too built there his curia.

Around the 1200 the area was called Parione e S. Lorenzo in Damaso and the population kept on increasing until the 15th century, when the borough obtained a great importance thanks to the paving of Campo de' Fiori, that soon became an important economic center.

Under Sixtus IV (1471–1484) the rione lost its chaotic look, typical of the Middle Ages, for a cleaner and tidier one, typical of the Renaissance. Recovering buildings, enlarging streets, building the new bridge Ponte Sisto connecting Trastevere and Parione, improved the quality of the area.

Thanks to this renewal, urbanisation increased between the 15th and the 16th century. In the same period, several artists were asked to renew the front of the greatest buildings: this habit was born in the northern Italy and was spreading in that period. In 1500 most of the commercial activity slowly moved from Campo de' Fiori to Piazza Navona, that was the favorite place since it was wider.

From 1574 to 1674, the appearance of Piazza Navona changed vastly, thanks to the work of Bernini, Borromini, and Bramante.

From this period until Rome became capital of unified Italy in 1870 there were no major changes but the opening of Corso Vittorio Emanuele II, a great street having a flexuous track in order to avoid the already existing palaces. If a palace was jutting, its front was moved backwards to preserve it.

== Geography ==
=== Boundaries ===
Northward, the rione borders with Ponte (R. V), whose boundary is defined by Piazza delle Cinque Lune, Piazza di Tor Sanguigna, Largo Febo, Via di Santa Maria dell'Anima, Via di Tor Millina, Via della Pace, Piazza del Fico, Via del Corallo, Via del Governo Vecchio, Via dei Filippini and Vicolo Cellini.

To the west and to the south, Parione borders with Regola (R. VII), the boundary being marked by Via dei Banchi Vecchi, Via del Pellegrino, Via dei Cappellari, Campo de' Fiori, Via dei Giubbonari.

Eastward, Parione borders with Sant'Eustachio (R. VIII), from which is separated by Via dei Chiavari, Largo dei Chiavari, Corso Vittorio Emanuele II, Corso del Rinascimento and Piazza delle Cinque Lune.

== Places of interest ==
=== Palaces and other buildings ===
- Palazzo Braschi, in Piazza di San Pantaleo.
- Palazzo Massimo alle Colonne, in Corso Vittorio Emanuele II.
- Palazzo Orsini Pio Righetti, in Piazza del Biscione.
- Palazzo Pamphilj, in Piazza Navona.
- Palazzo della Cancelleria, in Piazza della Cancelleria.
- Piccola Farnesina ai Baullari (Museo di Scultura Antica Giovanni Barracco), in Corso Vittorio Emanuele II.
- Palazzo Sora, in Corso Vittorio Emanuele II, on the corner of Via Sora.

=== Churches ===
- Santa Barbara dei Librai
- Santa Maria in Vallicella (Chiesa Nuova)
- San Lorenzo in Damaso
- Nostra Signora del Sacro Cuore (San Giacomo degli Spagnoli)
- Sant'Agnese in Agone
- San Nicola dei Lorenesi
- Natività di Gesù
- San Tommaso in Parione
- San Pantaleo
- Oratorio del Santissimo Sacramento e Cinque Piaghe
- Santa Maria in Grottapinta (deconsecrated)

=== Other ===
- Pasquino
