= Odoardo Vicinelli =

Italian painter (1684–1755)

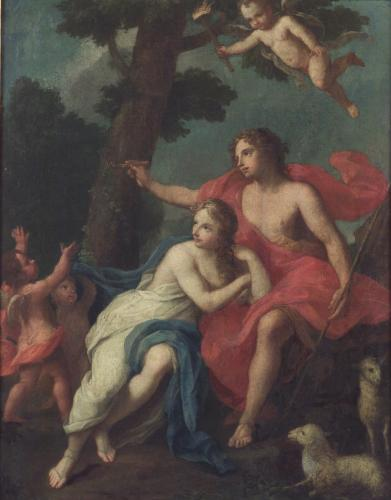
Angelica and Medoro, from Orlando Furioso

Odoardo Vicinelli (1683, Rome – 1755, Rome) was an Italian painter of the late-Baroque period.

== Life and work ==
He trained under Giovanni Maria Morandi, who was originally from Florence. His preference for a Classical chiaroscuro technique was developed at that time. He briefly worked with Pietro Nelli, who had also studied with Morandi.

Most of his career was spent in Rome. He created several murals for the church of San Giovanni Battista dei Genovesi, including one of the Cardinal Virtues. At the church of Santa Maria in Monticelli, he painted the altarpiece. A canvas portraying Saint Giacomo della Marca is at the Basilica of Santa Maria in Ara Coeli.

Outside of Rome, his notable works include a Madonna and Child with Saints; created at the cathedral in Sermoneta and now in the Diocesan Museum. He also worked in the Marche, where his paintings include an Annunciation in Iesi. A portrayal of "Our Lady of Sorrows", for a church in Ripatransone, is now in the Museo civico di Osimo.

In his Vita de' pittori, scultori, ed architetti moderni (1736), Lione Pascoli mentions numerous works by Vicinelli that were created in Rome, but sent throughout central Italy and as far north as Genoa. He also cites commissions from princely families in Prague, Vienna and Lisbon, but these have not been confirmed by other sources.

== Sources ==
- Giovanni Rosini, Storia della Pittura Italiana esposta coi Monumenti, Volume VII, Presso Niccolò Capurro, Pisa, 1847 (Online)
- Giuseppe Cucco, "Odoardo Vicinelli", in Il culto e l'immagine. San Giacomo della Marca (1393-1476) nell'Iconografia Marchigiana, Federico Motta Editore, Milan 1988, pp. 123-124.
- Giuliano Centrodi, "Una proposta per Odoardo Vicinelli, pittore romano", in Bollettino d'informazione - Brigata Aretina degli Amici dei Monumenti, 1993, #57, pp. 22-24.
