= San Giovanni Battista dei Cavalieri di Rodi =

- Church of Saint John the Baptist of the Knights of Rhodes
- Chiesa di San Giovanni Battista dei Cavalieri di Rodi
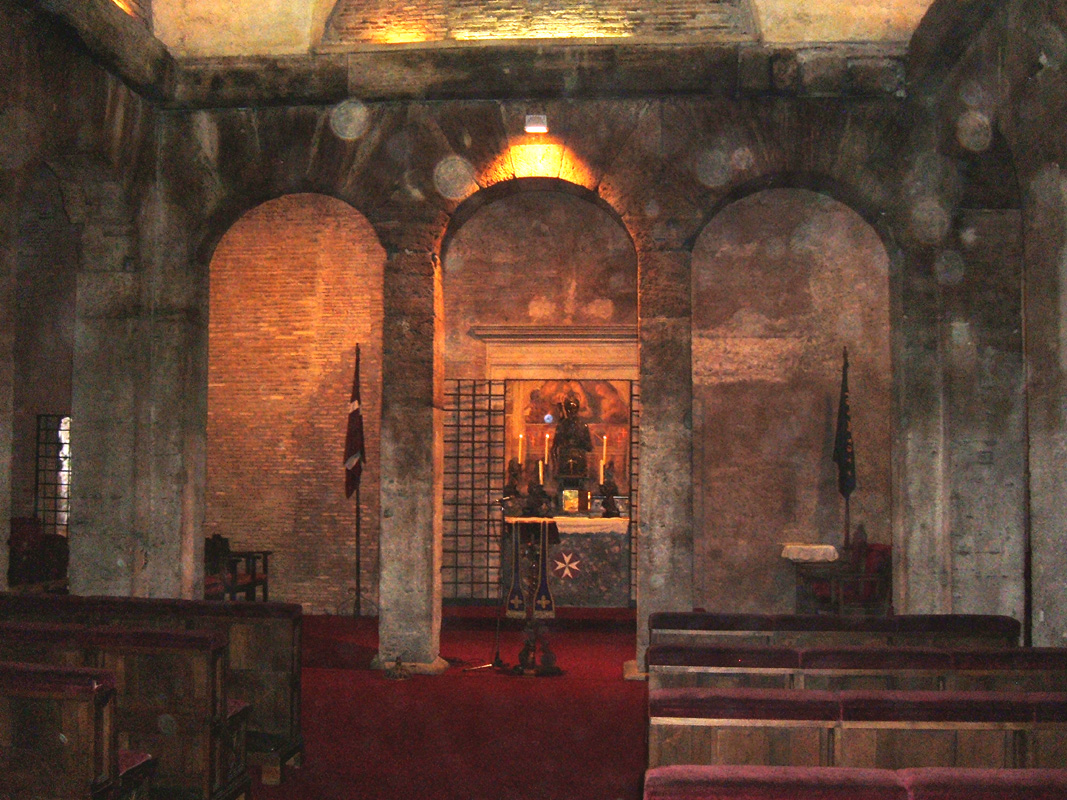
- Interior
- Click on the map for a fullscreen view
- 41°53′41″N 12°29′12″E
- Location: Piazza del Grillo 1, Monti, Rome
- Country: Italy
- Language: Italian
- Denomination: Catholic
- Tradition: Roman Rite
- Religious order: Knights Hospitaller

History
- Status: national church
- Founded: 1946 (as church)
- Dedication: John the Baptist

Architecture
- Architect: Giuliano da Maiano
- Architectural type: Romanesque

Administration
- Diocese: Rome

San Giovanni Battista dei Cavalieri di Rodi (Saint John the Baptist of the Knights of Rhodes) is a church in Rome, on piazza del Grillo in the Monti district. Its full title is the Palatine Chapel of Saint John the Baptist of the Knights of Rhodes (cappella palatina di San Giovanni Battista dei Cavalieri di Rodi).

== History ==
Although it is built on the remains of the forum of Augustus, the church is a modern edifice, built in 1946 into one of the rooms of the 'Casa dei Cavalieri di Rodi' ('House of the Knights of Rhodes', also known as the Knights Hospitaller). The Knights had bought the lands of the Knights Templar when the latter was suppressed at the start of the 14th century. The church is built into a pilastered quadriporticus with travertine arches. On its back wall is an altar with sculptures by Alfredo Biagini ( 1886 - 1952 ).

== Bibliography ==
- A. Manodori, Rione I Monti, in AA.VV, I rioni di Roma, Newton & Compton Editori, Milano 2000, Vol. I, pp. 36–130
