= Santi Benedetto e Scholastica =

- Church of Saints Benedict and Scholastica
- Chiesa di Santi Benedetto e Scholastica
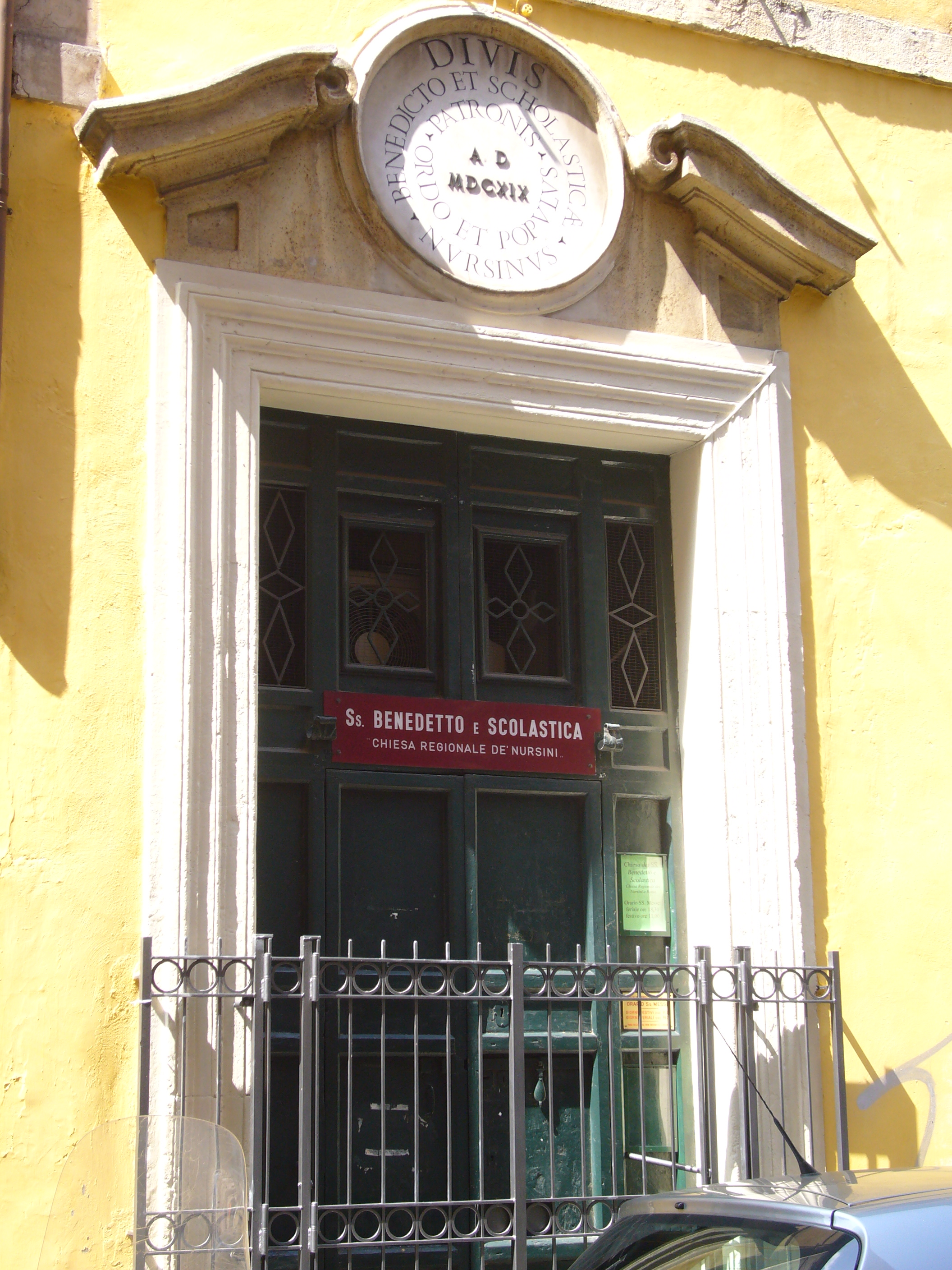
- Click on the map for a fullscreen view
- 41°53′48.6″N 12°28′34.7″E
- Location: Via di Torre Argentina 71, Sant'Eustachio, Rome
- Country: Italy
- Language: Italian
- Denomination: Catholic
- Tradition: Roman Rite
- Religious order: Benedictines
- Website: nursini.org

History
- Status: regional church
- Dedication: Benedict of Nursia and Scholastica

Architecture
- Functional status: active
- Architectural type: Baroque
- Groundbreaking: 1625

Administration
- Diocese: Rome

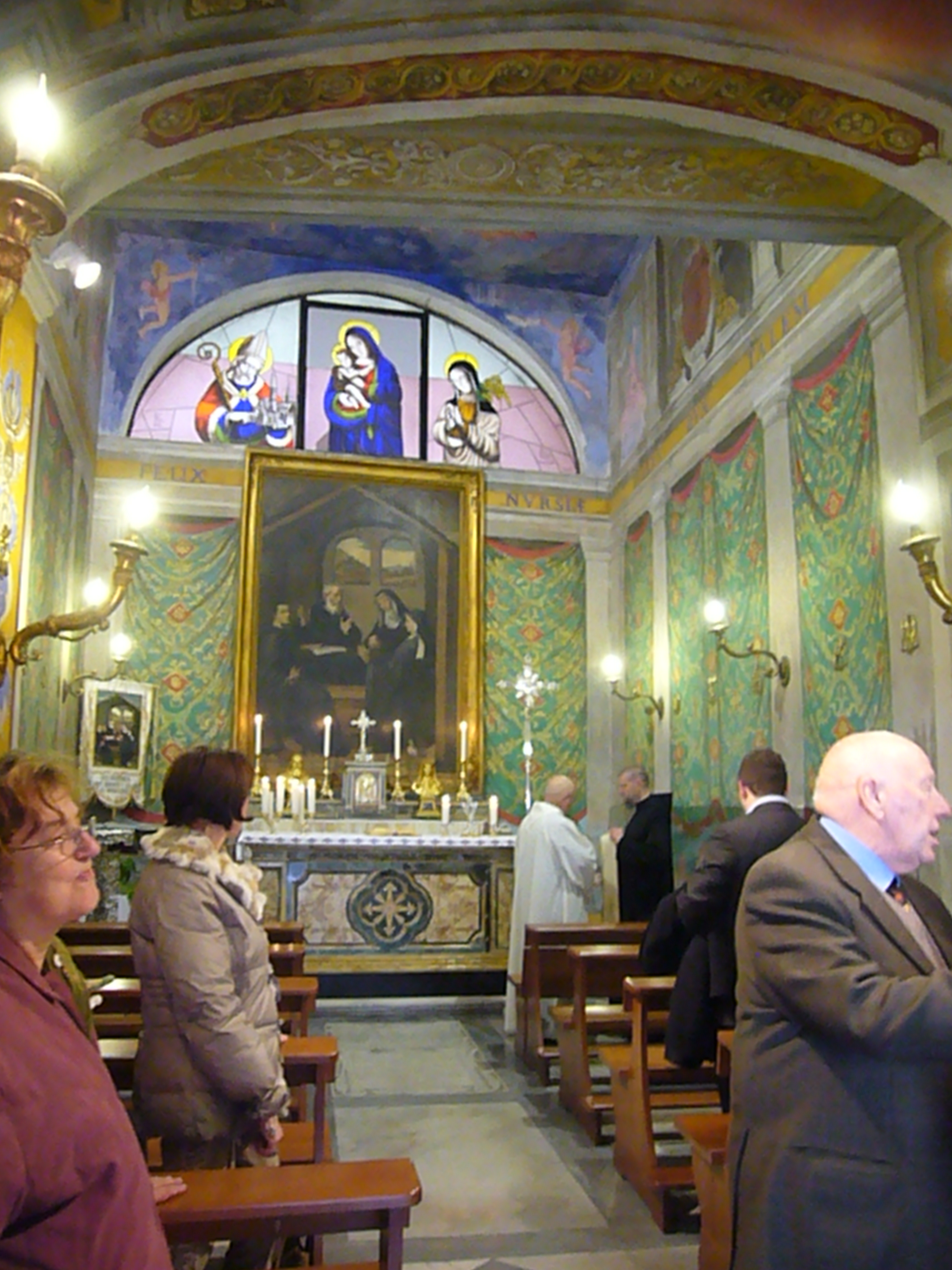

Santi Benedetto e Scolastica is a church in Rome.

== History ==
This tiny church is one of the smallest in Rome, and is the regional church for natives of the city and region of Norcia living in Rome. An archconfraternity to care for the welfare of Nursian expatriates was set up in Rome in the early 1600s. Pope Paul V approved it as a confraternity in 1615. At first, the group met in a chapel of Sant'Eustachio, but in 1622, the confraternity was bequeathed a property on the VIa di Torre Argentina. Gregory XV raised it to an archconfraternity in 1623.

The already existing house chapel was converted into a church with a separate entrance in 1625, and given the dedication is because St Benedict started his monastic career at Norcia before moving to Montecassino. St Scholastica was his sister, and by tradition was the first Benedictine nun. After 1808, during the French occupation of Rome, the church was looted of its artworks and desecrated. In 1841, the church was restored and reopened, and underwent further restoration under Pope Pius IX and Pope Leo XIII. At present it is cherished by its small congregation.

The Archconfraternity went into abeyance in the 1960s, but was revived in 1984 under new statutes.

== Exterior ==
The church is part of a larger building, and hence has no separate architectural identity. It is marked by the interesting and unusual dedicatory inscription over the entrance, which is written in concentric circles within a tondo. This tondo is flanked by two diagonal strips of cornice each with a faint S-curve, and which join to it via tiny volutes. The inscription reads "Divis Benedicto et Scholasticae Patronis nursinus ordo et populus", which translates as "To the honoured patrons Benedict and Scholastica, the council and people of Norcia".

== Interior ==
The single-roomed interior was entirely restored in the 19th century, and could be described as garish in places. The walls are painted to imitate green hanging curtains, with trompe-l'œil pilasters supporting an entablature with an inscription "Felix Nursiae tellus quae talem genuit alumnum" or "Happy land of Norcia, which gave birth to such a pupil". There is a painting of the patrons over the altar, and over that a lunette containing stained glass showing the Madonna and Child being venerated by saints.

== Opening ==
The church is open for Mass at 18:00, except Sunday which is 11:00.
