= San Giovanni della Malva in Trastevere =

- Church of Saint John of the Mallows Beyond the Tiber
- Chiesa di San Giovanni della Malva in Trastevere
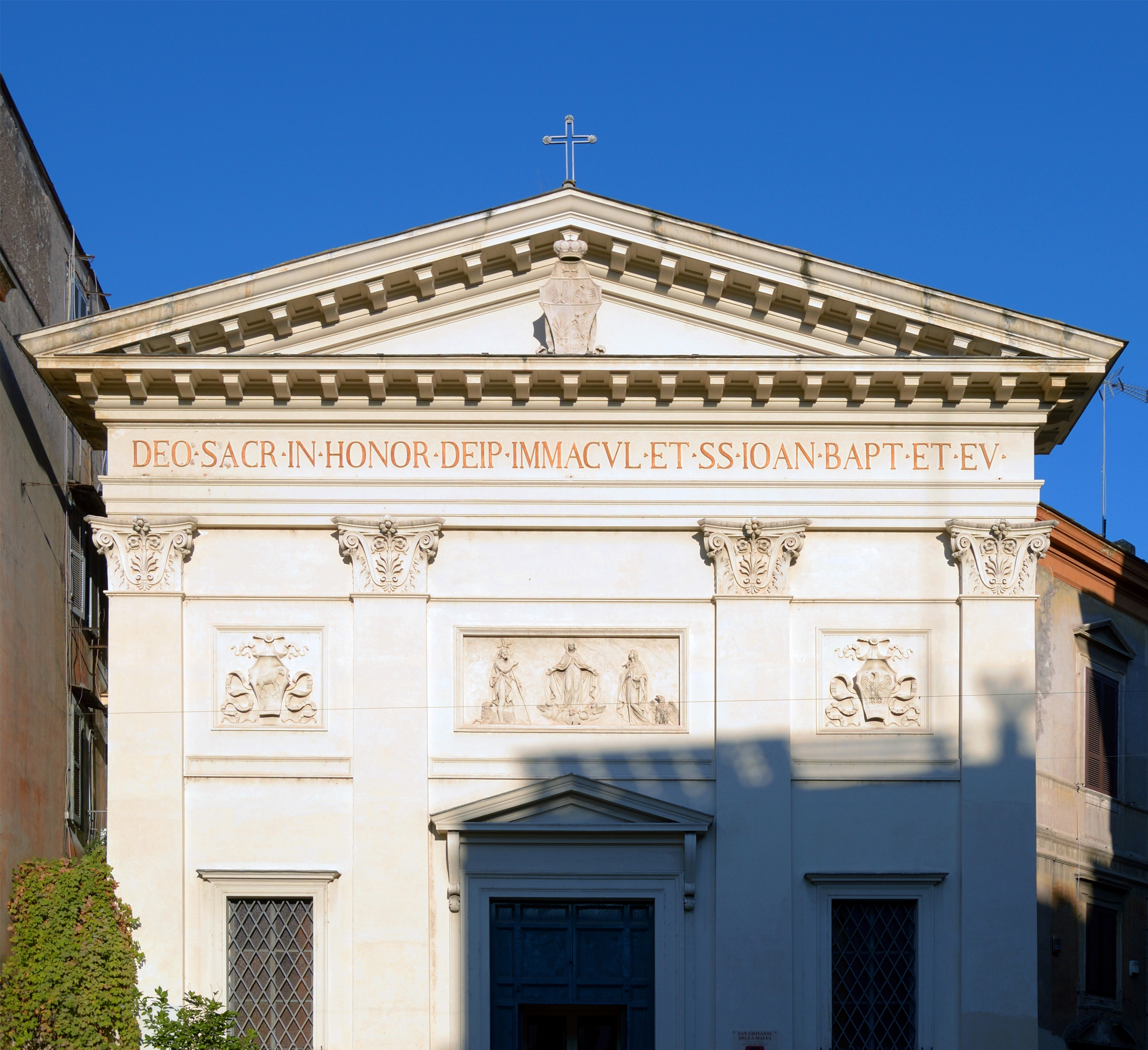
- The facade of San Giovanni della Malva
- Click on the map for a fullscreen view
- 41°53′32″N 12°28′09″E
- Location: Piazza di San Giovanni della Malva , Trastevere, Rome
- Country: Italy
- Language: Albanian
- Denomination: Catholic
- Tradition: Roman Rite

History
- Status: national church
- Founded: Before 1123
- Dedication: Immaculate Conception, John the Baptist and John the Evangelist

Architecture
- Architect: Giacomo Moraldi
- Architectural type: Baroque, Neoclassical
- Completed: 1851

Administration
- Diocese: Rome

San Giovanni della Malva in Trastevere (Albanian: kisha e Shën Janit të Shqiptarëve, kisha e Shën Janit së Mëllagës pas lumit) is a church in Rome, in the Trastevere district, located in Piazza di S. Giovanni della Malva. It is the Albanian national church in Rome.

== History ==
The church dates back to the Middle Ages. It is attested by a bull of Pope Callixtus II of 1123 with the name of Sancti Iohannis prope portam Septimianam (near the Porta Settimiana). It was known in the fourteenth century by the name of Sancti Iohannis ad Ianiculum (al Gianicolo). The current name, attested only since 1367, can derive either from the mallow that grew near or from the corruption of the name Mica Aurea (golden sand), a name that in the Middle Ages was given to the part of the Gianicolo still called Montorio. Moreover, in some catalogues of Roman churches, it is called Sancti Iohannis Mica Aurea. In 1475, on the occasion of the Jubilee and the opening of the Sisto bridge, Pope Sixtus IV had it restored. In 1818 the medieval church was demolished because it was dilapidated and in a state of decay, and in 1851 a new one was built, financed by Pio Grazioli, based on a project by Giacomo Moraldi.

== Description ==
The church has a tripartite façade and a triangular tympanum; above the door there is a bas relief depicting the Virgin Mary with saints John the Evangelist and John the Baptist. This recalls that the church is dedicated to the Immaculate and to two saints named John (as also attested by an epigraph inside). Also in the façade there are two coats of arms with the lamb and the eagle that allude to the two saints. The interior forms a Greek Cross (while the ancient church had three naves), with a hemispherical dome. The church leads to an atrium, above which there is the choir. Nothing remains of the ancient interior decoration; only works from the eighteenth and nineteenth centuries are exhibited, mostly by unknown or uncertain authors. The altarpiece depicting the Madonna among the Evangelist and Baptist dominates.

== Bibliography ==
- C. Hulsen, The Churches of Rome in the Middle Ages, Florence 1927, on penelope.uchicago.edu.
- M. Armellini, The Churches of Rome from the 4th to the 19th century, Rome 1891, on penelope.uchicago.edu.
- C. Rendina, The Churches of Rome, Newton & Compton Editori, Milan 2000, p. 134.
- G. Carpaneto, Rione XIII Trastevere, in AA.VV, the districts of Rome, Newton & Compton Editori, Milan 2000, Vol. III, pp. 831–923.
