= Palazzo Maccarani Stati =

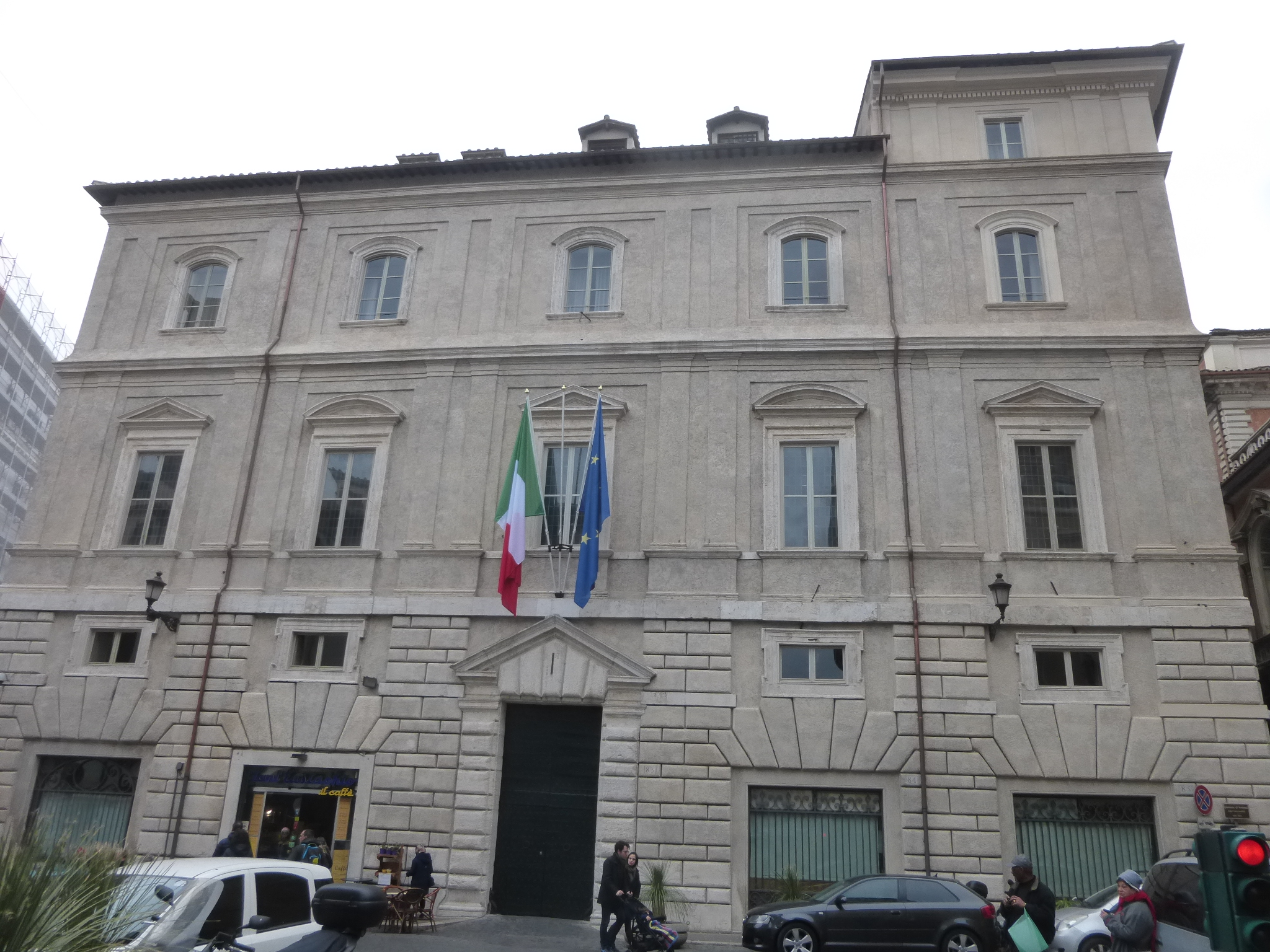
- Palazzo Maccarani Stati
- Interactive map of the Palazzo Maccarani Stati area

General information
- Type: Palazzo
- Architectural style: Renaissance
- Location: Rome, Italy
- Coordinates: 41°53′53.8″N 12°28′31.3″E
- Construction started: 1519
- Construction stopped: 1524
- Owner: State property

Technical details
- Floor count: 3 levels

Design and construction
- Architect: Giulio Romano

The Palazzo Maccarani Stati is a medieval palace located in Rome in Sant'Eustachio. The palace was designed by Giulio Romano; this is his last work in Rome. The name of the palace has two surnames. Stati is the surname of the initial owners of the structure. The building was a private palace of the wealthy Stati family that later went bankrupt. In 1786, the palazzo passed to the Maccarani family, related to the initial owners.

== History ==
According to what Giorgio Vasari claims in his Vite, in 1521, the curator of Rome Cristoforo Stati (1498–1550), belonging to the ancient Roman line of the Statis of Tomarozzi, with money from the dowry of his wife Faustina Cenci, entrusted the renovation of some family properties in today's Sant'Eustachio to his architect and painter Giulio Romano. The latter was inspired by the structure, although simplified, of Palazzo Caprini by Donato Bramante. The palace formerly known as Palazzo Stati Cenci, today as Palazzo Maccarani Stati, is one of the Romano's rare projects.

== Architecture ==
The facade on Piazza S. Eustachio has an ashlar ground floor featuring four garage doors and a portal with two rusticated pilasters that support the triangular tympanum; above is the mezzanine floor with four simple rectangular windows. The windows are extended horizontally.

The first noble floor facade features five alternating arched and triangular large windows and numerous paired pilasters. The second noble floor has five smaller arched windows.

The building surrounds an interior courtyard.
