= Sant'Ivo dei Bretoni =

Church of St. Ivo of the Bretons
- Saint Yves-des-Bretons (in French)
- Sant'Ivo dei Bretoni (in Italian)
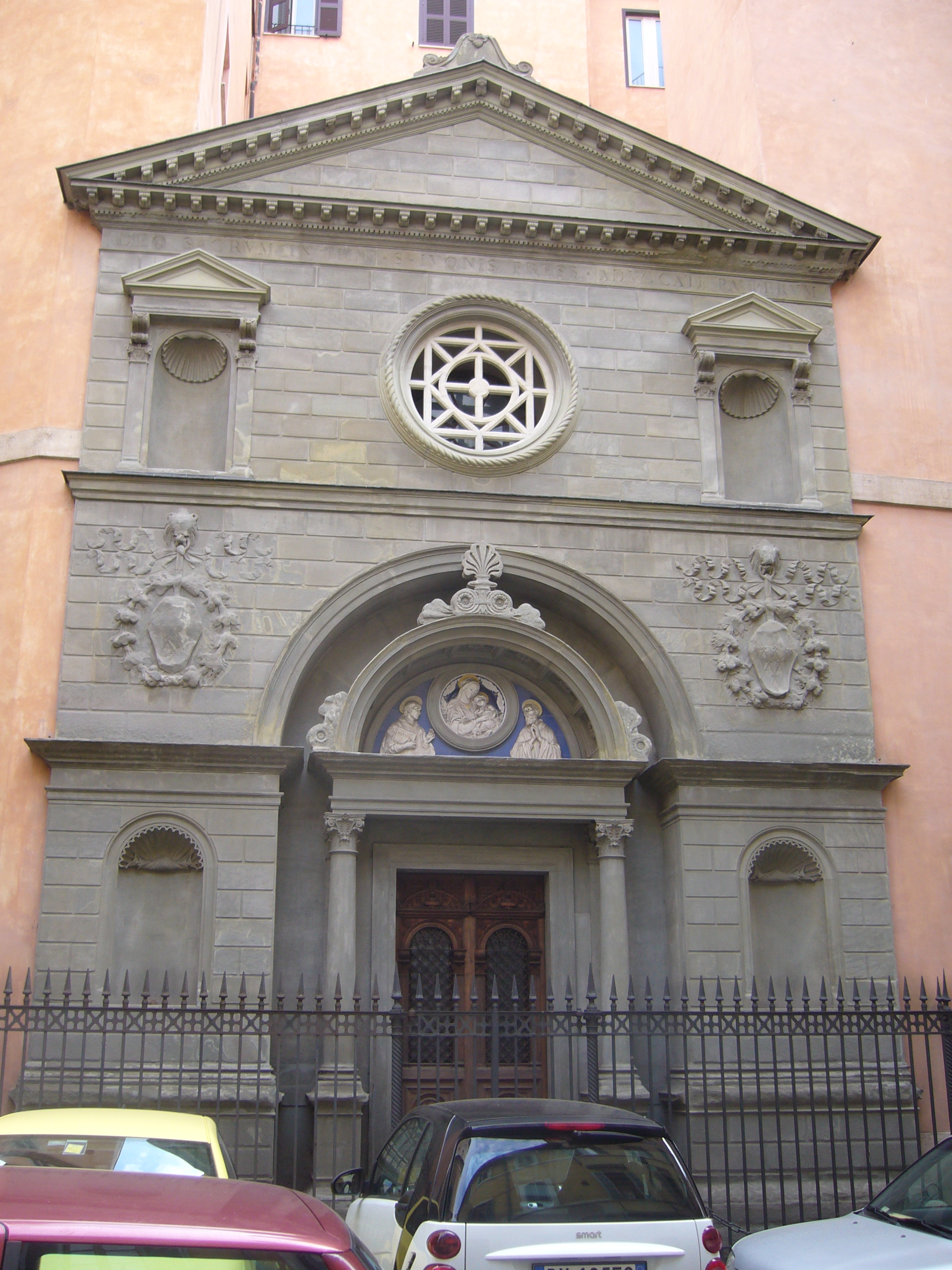
- Façade of Sant'Ivo dei Bretoni, National Church in Rome of France (Brittany).
- Click on the map for a fullscreen view
- 41°54′9.3″N 12°28′29.2″E
- Location: Vicolo della Campana 9, Campo Marzio, Rome
- Country: Italy
- Denomination: Roman Catholic
- Tradition: Roman rite
- Website: Official website

History
- Status: national church
- Dedication: Ivo of Kermartin

Architecture
- Architect: Luca Carimini
- Architectural type: Church
- Style: Neo-Renaissance
- Groundbreaking: 12th century
- Completed: 1890

The Church of Saint Ivo of the Bretons (Italian: Sant'Ivo dei Bretoni, French: Saint Yves-des-Bretons, Breton: Iliz Sant Erwan ar Vretoned) is a Roman Catholic church dedicated to Saint Ivo of Kermartin, patron of Brittany. It is one of the national churches in Rome dedicated to Brittany.

== History ==
Pope Callixtus III (1455–1458) gave the church of St. Andrea de Mortarariis to the Breton community in Rome. It became a center for assistance to Breton pilgrims. The church was pulled down and rebuilt in 1878 by Luca Carimini in Neo-Renaissance style.

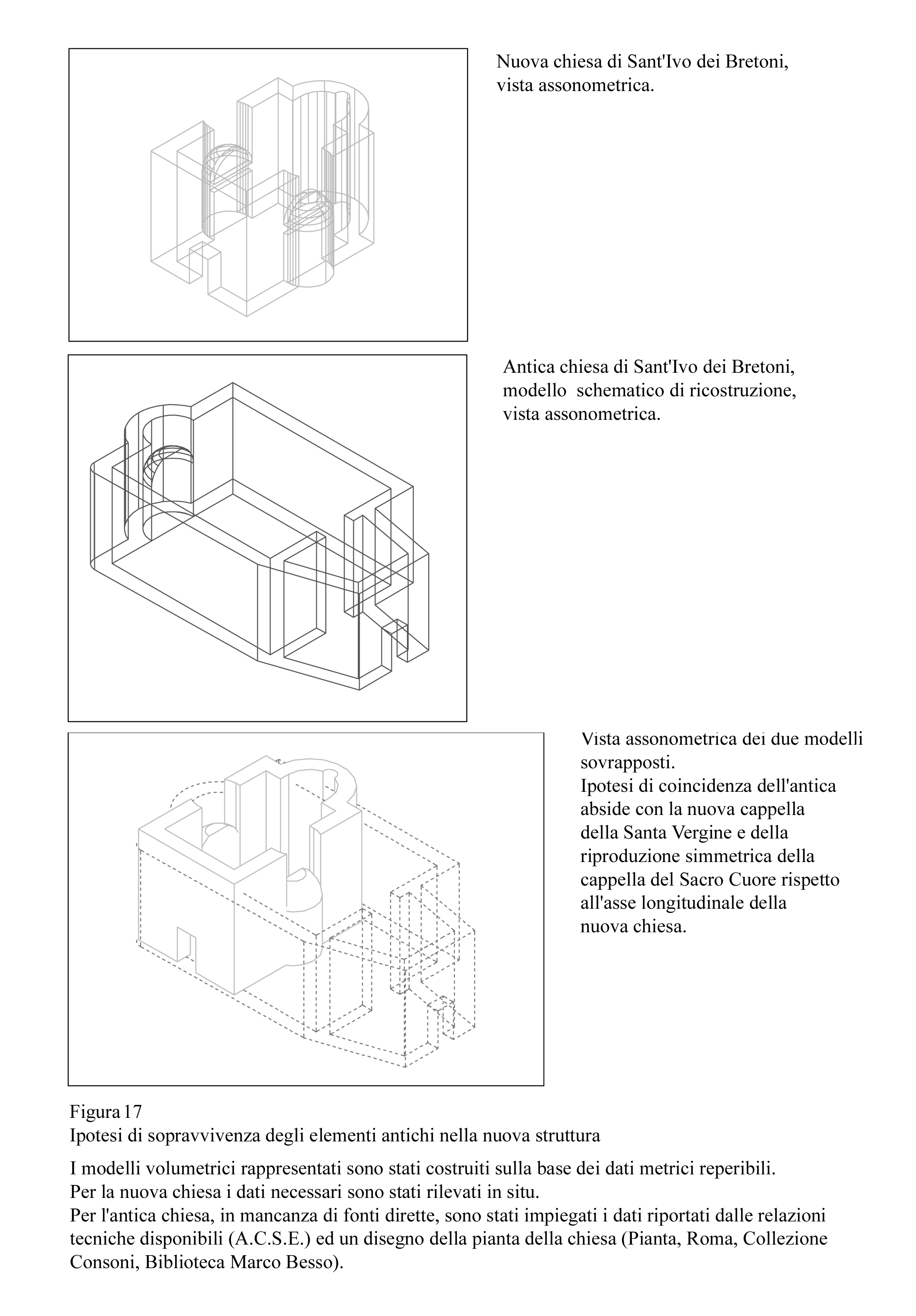
Roma Sant'Ivo dei Bretoni - Ipotesi di sopravvivenza degli elementi antichi nella nuova struttura

The hypothesis that the elements of the ancient church walls have been retained in the new construction, which consists of buildings and the new church, is founded. The maintenance of the old apse, would coincide with the current chapel of the Blessed Virgin (Santa Vergine). Some considerations in support of this hypothesis relate to the form of the new church. The persistence of the masonry structure of the apse, with its proportions, would have affected the plan and the elevation development. The 90 ° rotation of the axis of the church (necessary for obtaining a building of smaller dimensions in the same lot), would have required the construction of a symmetric chapel, equally great.
