= San Salvatore alle Coppelle =

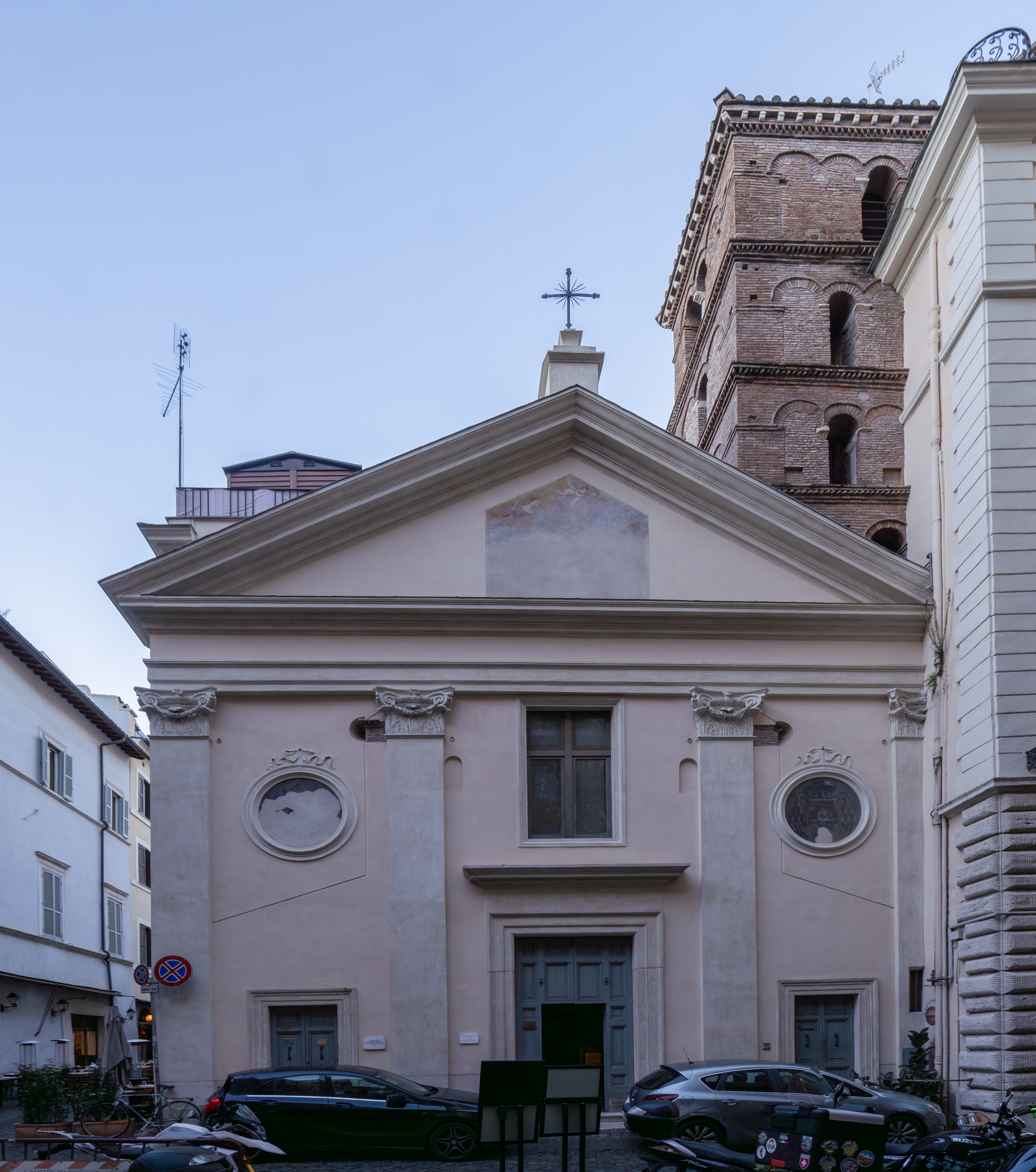
- The church
- Click on the map for a fullscreen view
- 41°54′02″N 12°28′34″E
- Location: Piazza delle Coppelle, Rome
- Country: Italy
- Denomination: Romanian Greek Catholic
- Tradition: Byzantine rite

History
- Status: national church

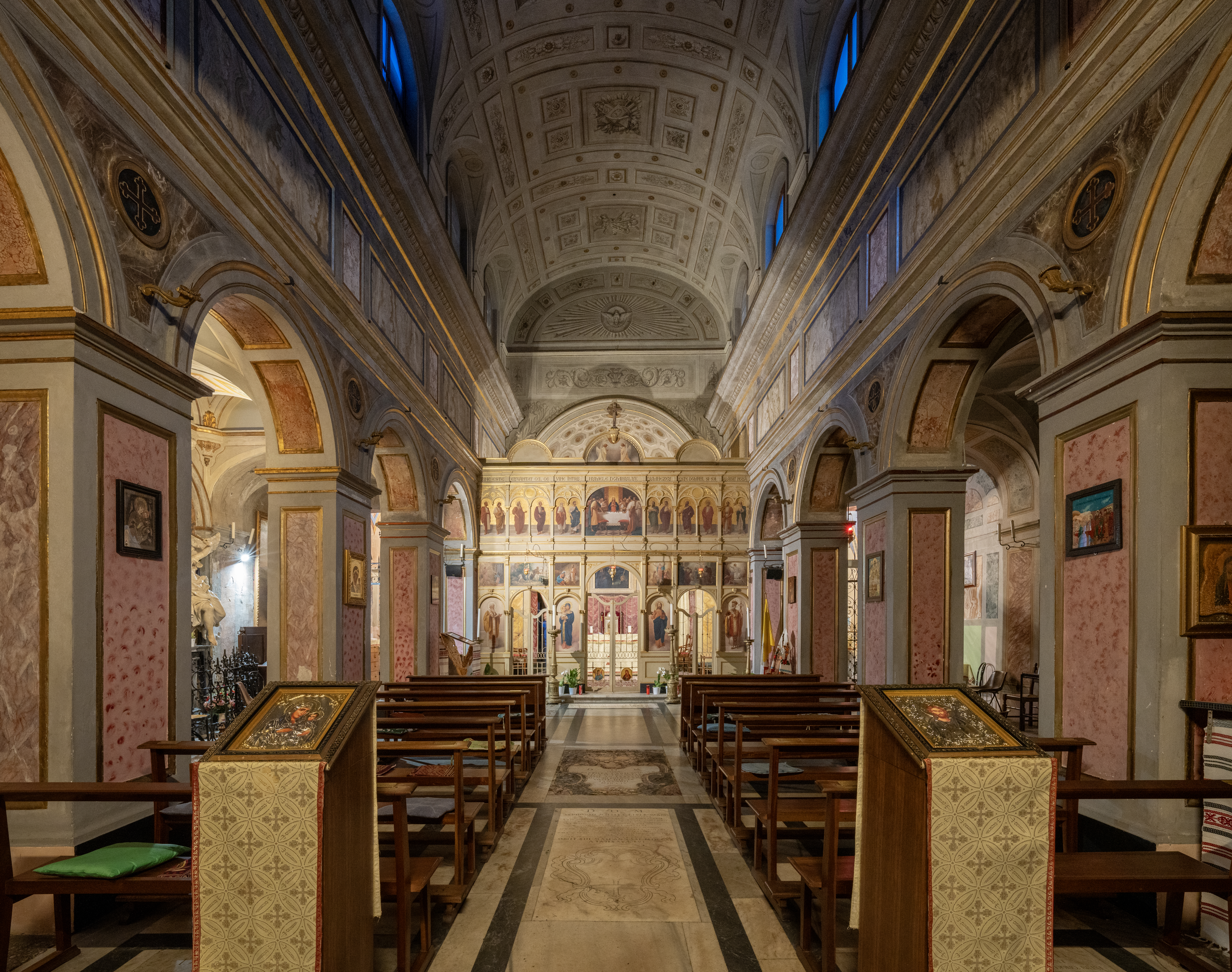
Interior of the church, showing the iconostasis.

San Salvatore alle Coppelle is a church in Rome, on piazza delle Coppelle in the Sant'Eustachio district. It is a national church for the Romanian Greek Catholics, using the Byzantine Rite.

== History ==
A wall inscription inside the church states it was completed under pope Celestine III on 26 November 1195, though this likely refers to a refurbishment rather than the original construction, which was possibly much earlier. A now-lost ancient inscription refers to the church originally being built on the site of the house of saint Abbasia, a noblewoman who left her estate to charity, forming the basis of a Monte di Pietà, giving the church its medieval name of San Salvatore de Pietate. Other sources believe the church gained this name after the Trajanic Arco della Pietà, now lost but still surviving in ruins in the 14th century. This church in turn may be identifiable with that known as San Salvatore de Sere in some medieval documents.

In 1404 pope Innocent VII gave the church to the Università dei Sellai, which owned it for three centuries. In 1633, it became the base for the Confraternity of the Most Holy Sacrament of Divine Perseverance, which assisted pilgrims and foreigners who fell ill in Rome's inns, needed hospital treatment or looking after their bereaved families. In 1750 (a jubilee year), the church was rebuilt by Carlo De Dominicis, including the addition of a still-visible slot in the side of the church for innkeepers to drop off sick people, with a note to the brotherhood.

A guide to Rome from the early 19th century cited a main altarpiece by Giovanni Battista Lelli. The church contained a tomb memorial for Cardinal Giorgio Spinola, designed by Bernardino Ludovisi.

Between 1858 and 1860 the church's two 1195 frescoes were defaced. All that remains of the medieval church is the bell tower, built during the 12th century renovation and now partly surrounded by a neighbouring building. On 31 March 1914 the church was made the national church for the Greek Catholics of Romania and began to be used for services in the Byzantine Rite.

== Bibliography ==
- C. Rendina, Le Chiese di Roma, Newton & Compton Editori, Milano 2000, p. 332
- G. Carpaneto, Rione VIII Sant’Eustachio, in AA.VV, I rioni di Roma, Newton & Compton Editori, Milano 2000, Vol. II, pp. 499–555
