= San Giovanni Battista dei Genovesi =

Church in Rome

- Church of Saint John the Baptist of the Genoans
- Chiesa di San Giovanni Battista dei Genovesi
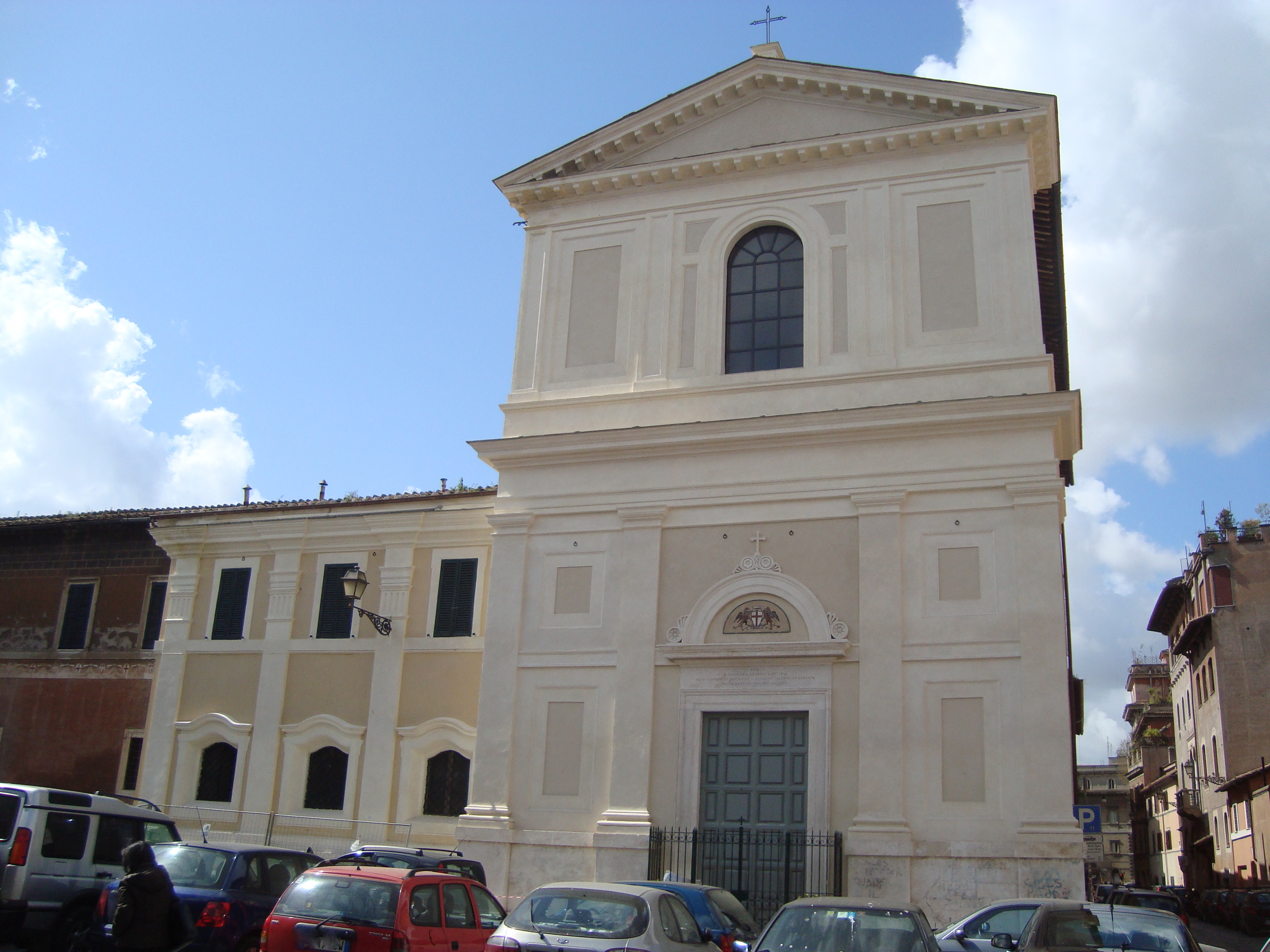
- Click on the map for a fullscreen view
- 41°53′17″N 12°28′31″E
- Location: 34 Via Giulia, Trastevere, Rome
- Country: Italy
- Language: Italian
- Denomination: Catholic
- Tradition: Roman Rite

History
- Status: regional church
- Founder: Meliaduce Cicala
- Dedication: John the Baptist

Architecture
- Functional status: active
- Architectural type: Baroque
- Groundbreaking: 1481
- Completed: mid-19th century

Administration
- Diocese: Rome

San Giovanni Battista dei Genovesi (Saint John the Baptist of the Genoans in English) is a Roman Catholic church on via Anicia in the Trastevere district of Rome. It is the regional church for Genoa.

== History ==
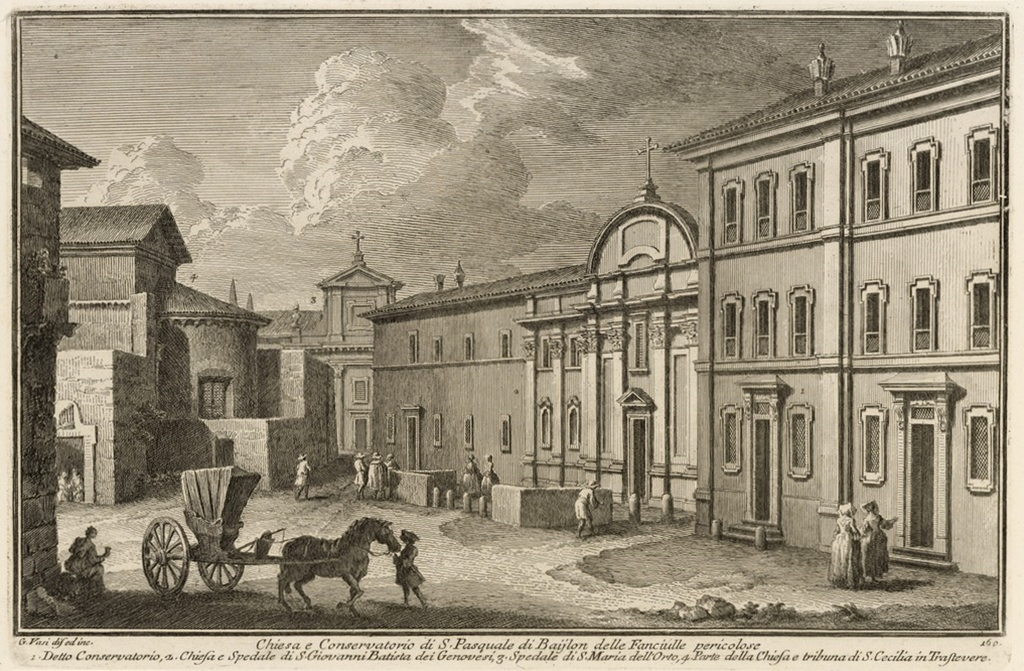
Giovanni Battista dei Genovesi and Conservatory.

The church was the national church of the Genoese residing in Rome. It was built between 1481 and 1492 by the wealthy Genoan Meliaduce Cicala, treasurer of the Camera Apostolica. The church takes its name from the ancient hospital where Genoese sailors were received and treated, as soon as they disembarked in the nearby Port of Ripa Grande. In 1533, the Confraternity of Genoans was founded to administer the church and the hospital, which continued to function until the mid 18th century. The former hospital is still accessible from via Anicia.

The church was rebuilt in 1737, with an apse added to its facade. It was not altered until the mid 19th century when a new facade with two floors and Doric pilasters were added. The interior was redesigned with a single nave and three altars. The coat-of-arms of the city of Genova, crowned by a tympanum and a bell tower, can be seen above the entrance. In 1890, the confraternity was renamed Opera Pia.

There is a 15th-century portal which leads into the Renaissance cloister that is the work of Baccio Pontelli, the architect of Sixtus IV. In the center of the courtyard-garden there are oranges, lemon and mandarin trees, myrtle hedges, acanthus plants, and climbing roses in the 15th-century travertine well standing in the centre, with two columns that date to the 14th century. In 1588, the first palm tree of Rome was planted. The cloister leads to the Oratorio di san Giovanni Battista dei Genovesi, from the 16th century, with a coffered ceiling, and frescoes with Stories of the Virgin and John the Baptist.

The following are the main ancient works:

- 15th-century tomb of Meliaduce Cicala, from the school of Andrea Bregno
- 15th-century Tabernacle of holy oils, a Florentine work
- 17th-century altarpiece depicting St. George and the dragon by Filippo Zucchetti
- Baptism of Christ, the main altarpiece made by the Caravaggesque painter Nicola Regnier before 1627
- 18th-century Chapel of Saint Caterina Fieschi with frescoes by Odoardo Vicinelli
- Plaque that recalls how in 1588 the first palm tree in Rome was planted
- Apparition of the Virgin of Savona, by Giovanni Odazzi

== In popular culture ==
In the third season of Medici (TV Series), scenes featuring the garden of San Marco were shot at the cloister of the church of San Giovanni Battista dei Genovesi in Rome. The garden is seen in the series as a meeting place between Lorenzo Medici and Girolamo Savonarola.

== Bibliography ==
- Mariano Armellini Le chiese di Roma dal secolo IV al XIX, Roma 1891
- G. Carpaneto, Rione XIII Trastevere, in AA.VV, I rioni di Roma, Newton & Compton Editori, Milano 2000, Vol. III, pp. 831–923
- Alberto Manodori, San Giovanni Battista dei Genovesi – la chiesa l'ospizio e la confraternita, Roma 1983 ISBN 88-7062-548-6
- C. Rendina, Le Chiese di Roma, Newton & Compton Editori, Milano 2000, p. 130-131

== See also ==
- National churches in Rome
