= Palazzo Orsini Pio Righetti =

Coordinates: 41°53′43″N 12°28′23″E

- Palazzo Pio
- Palazzo Orsini Pio Righetti

General information
- Location: Rome, Italy

The Palazzo Orsini Pio Righetti (also Palazzo Pio) is a building in the Roman district of Parione. It was built around 1450 and lies on top of the ruins of the Temple of Venus Victrix of the Theatre of Pompey. Part of the building was commissioned by Cardinal Francesco Condulmer, nephew of Pope Eugene IV, while most of it was built for the Orsini family. In the 17th century, the facade was redesigned. It overlooks other neighbouring areas of Campo de' Fiori and Piazza del Biscione in Rome, Italy.

It was beneath the courtyard of this Palace on 8 August 1864 that a gilded bronze statue of Hercules was discovered in excellent condition. The statue was donated to Pope Pius IX and is now part of the exhibits of the Vatican Museum.

Since the mid-1800s, the Palazzo Pio has been owned by Ospizio di Tata Giovanni, an ecclesiastical organization that cares for orphans. The first, third, and fourth floors are currently leased by the University of Washington.
