= Resurrezione di Nostro Signore Gesù Cristo, Rome =

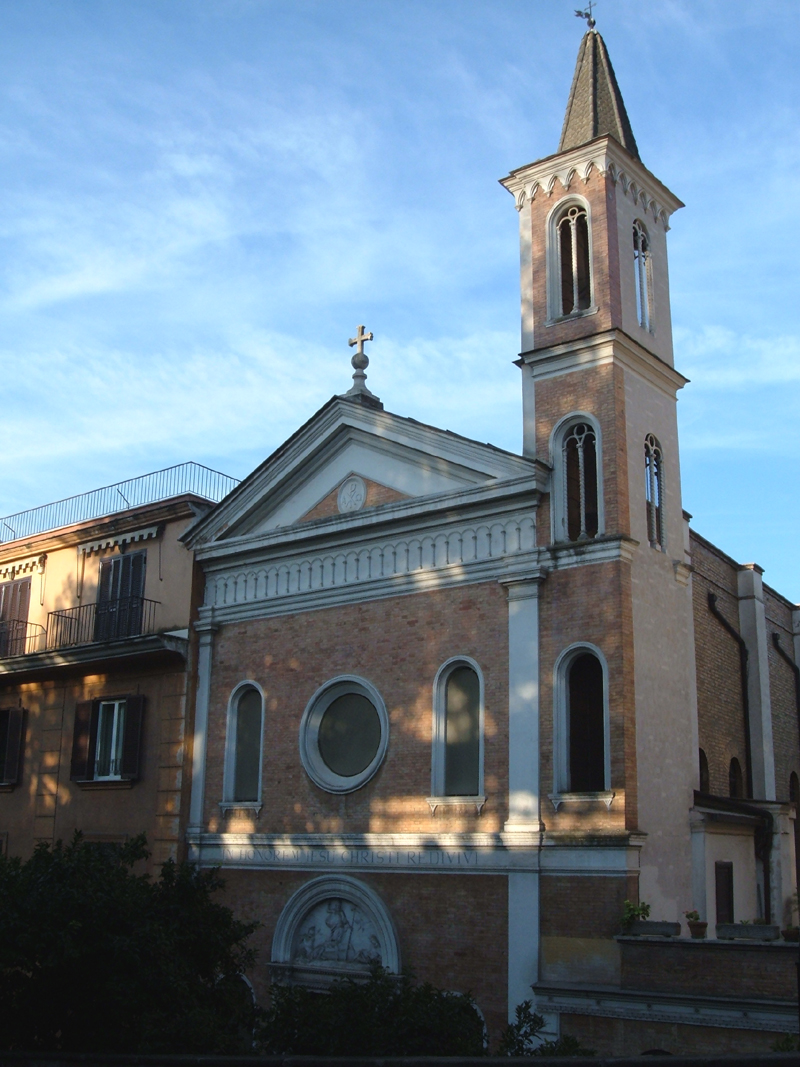

Risurrezione di Nostro Signore Gesù Cristo (Resurrection of Our Lord Jesus Christ) is a church in Rome, on via di San Sebastianello in the Campo Marzio district. It is a subsidiary church in the parish of San Giacomo in Augusta and is regarded as Poland's subsidiary national church in Rome.

It was built in 1889 to serve the neighbouring Polish Resurrectionist Congregation house. It has a single nave with two side altars, dedicated to the Most Holy Cross and to the Virgin of Good Counsel.

== Bibliography ==
- M. Armellini, Le chiese di Roma dal secolo IV al XIX, Roma 1891, p. 343
