= Santissimo Sudario all'Argentina =

Coordinates: 41.896004°N 12.475637°E

Chiesa del Santissimo Sudario dei Piemontesi
- Church of the Most Holy Shroud at the Argentina
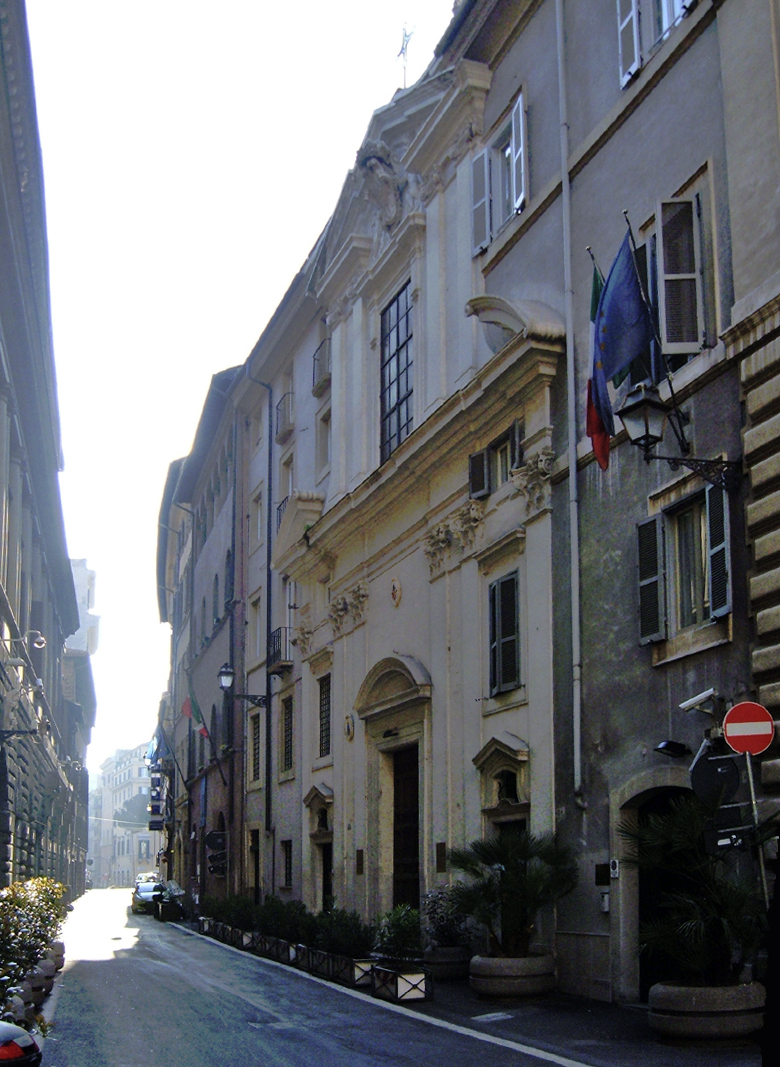
- Facade of the church
- Click on the map for a fullscreen view
- Location: Via del Sudario, Rome
- Country: Italy
- Denomination: Catholic Church

History
- Status: regional church

Architecture
- Architectural type: Church

Santissimo Sudario all'Argentina ([Church of] the Most Holy Shroud at the Argentina) or Santissimo Sudario dei Piemontesi (Church of the Most Holy Shroud of the Piedmontese) is a church in Rome, sited on the via del Sudario in the Sant'Eustachio district. It is the subsidiary church of the military orders in Italy. It was also once the national church of the Kingdom of Sardinia and is now the regional church for Piedmont and Sardinia. It houses a replica of the Turin Shroud.

== History ==
Originally dedicated to Saint Louis of France, it was rebuilt in 1605 by the Archconfraternity of the Savoyards and Piedmontese, which had been founded in Rome at the end of 1537 under the title of the 'sacra Sindone' or holy shroud and promoted to be an archconfraternity in 1592 by Pope Clement VIII.

The church was restored in 1678 by Carlo Rainaldi. During the Roman Republic of 1798 to 1799 it was deconsecrated and used as a magazine and armoury. In 1856 it was restored and in 1870 became a kind of private chapel for the House of Savoy.

== Description ==
A guide from the 19th century ascribes the main altarpiece to Antonio Gherardi, which accompanied a replica of the Holy Shroud. Other altarpieces depict St Frances of Sales by Carlo Cesi, and a Blessed Amadeo of Savoy by Giovanni Domenico Cerrini; and others by Lazzaro Baldi.

== Bibliography ==
- M. Armellini, Le chiese di Roma dal secolo IV al XIX, Roma 1891
- G. Carpaneto, Rione VIII Sant’Eustachio, in AA.VV, I rioni di Roma, Newton & Compton Editori, Milano 2000, Vol. II, pp. 499–555.
- C. Hulsen, Le chiese di Roma nel Medio Evo, Firenze 1927
- C. Rendina, Le Chiese di Roma, Newton & Compton Editori, Milano 2000, p. 354.
- F. Titi, Descrizione delle Pitture, Sculture e Architetture esposte in Roma, Roma 1763
