= Giuseppe Paladino (1721–1794) =

Italian painter

Giuseppe Paladino or Paladini (1721 – 3 January 1794) was an Italian painter of the 18th century, active in a late-Baroque style in Messina, Sicily.

== Biography ==
He was born and had initial training in Messina, under his uncle, Litterio Paladino. All his immediate family died during the plague of 1738.

He traveled to Rome to be a pupil of Sebastiano Conca, and met his fellow Sicilian Salvatore Monosilio. He was patronized by Cardinal York in Rome. He returned to Messina and painted in Santa Maria Lampedusa a Defeat of the Fallen Angels, the Story of Joseph, the Passage of the Ark, the Drowning of the Pharaoh in the Red Sea. He also painted in the monk's choir in the church of San Gregorio. He painted in the Oratory of the Bianchi. He frescoed the tribune and cupola of the Annunziata dei Teatini, Messina (destroyed in 1908 earthquake). He painted a canvas for the church of San Giovanni Gerosolimitano, depicting San Egidio.
