= Matteo Pannaria =

Italian painter

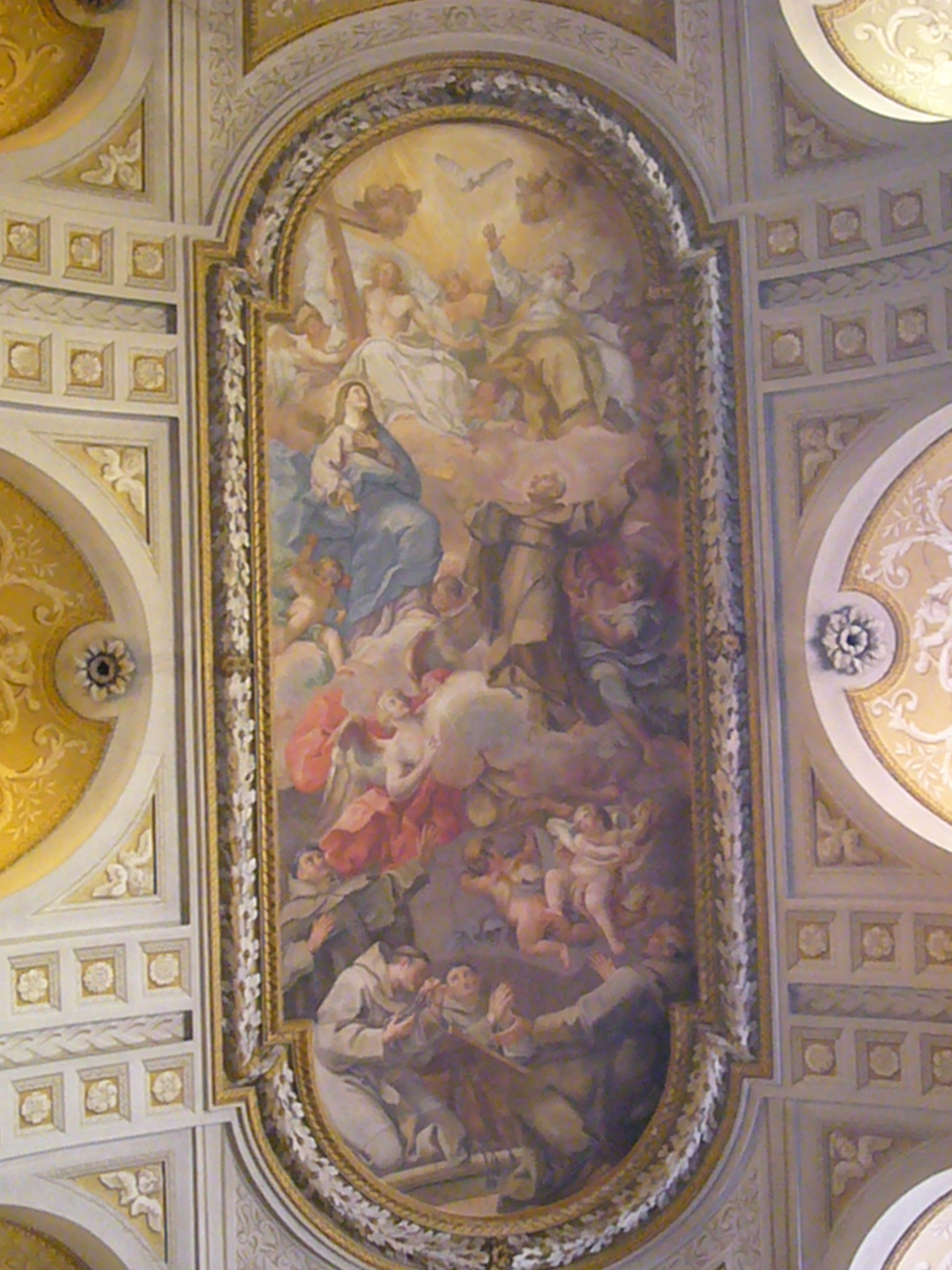
Gloria di s Pasquale

Matteo Pannaria or Panaria or Pannerio (active 1750) was an Italian painter of the late-Baroque. He was born in Palermo, Sicily and active both in Rome and Jesi. He painted a Gloria di San Giovanni Nepomuceno (1753) ("Glory of Saint John of Nepomuk") for the church of San Giovanni Battista in Jesi. He frescoed the ovals in the ceiling of the church of Santi Quaranta Martiri in Rome. Over the nave is the Glory of San Pedro de Alcantara, while the transept crossing depicts Glory of San Pascual. He also painted Beato Giovanni of Prado in one of the chapels.

Between 1746 and 1764 Pannaria painted canvases for the Church of S. Maria Fuor di Monsano, depicting the "Deposition of Jesus from the Cross" and the "Madonna and Child between San Domenico and San Giovanni Nepomuceno". He also painted the "Madonna della Vita: Madonna Enthroned, S. Emidio and S. Agata" which is kept in the Parish Church of S. Pietro Apostolo in Jesi.

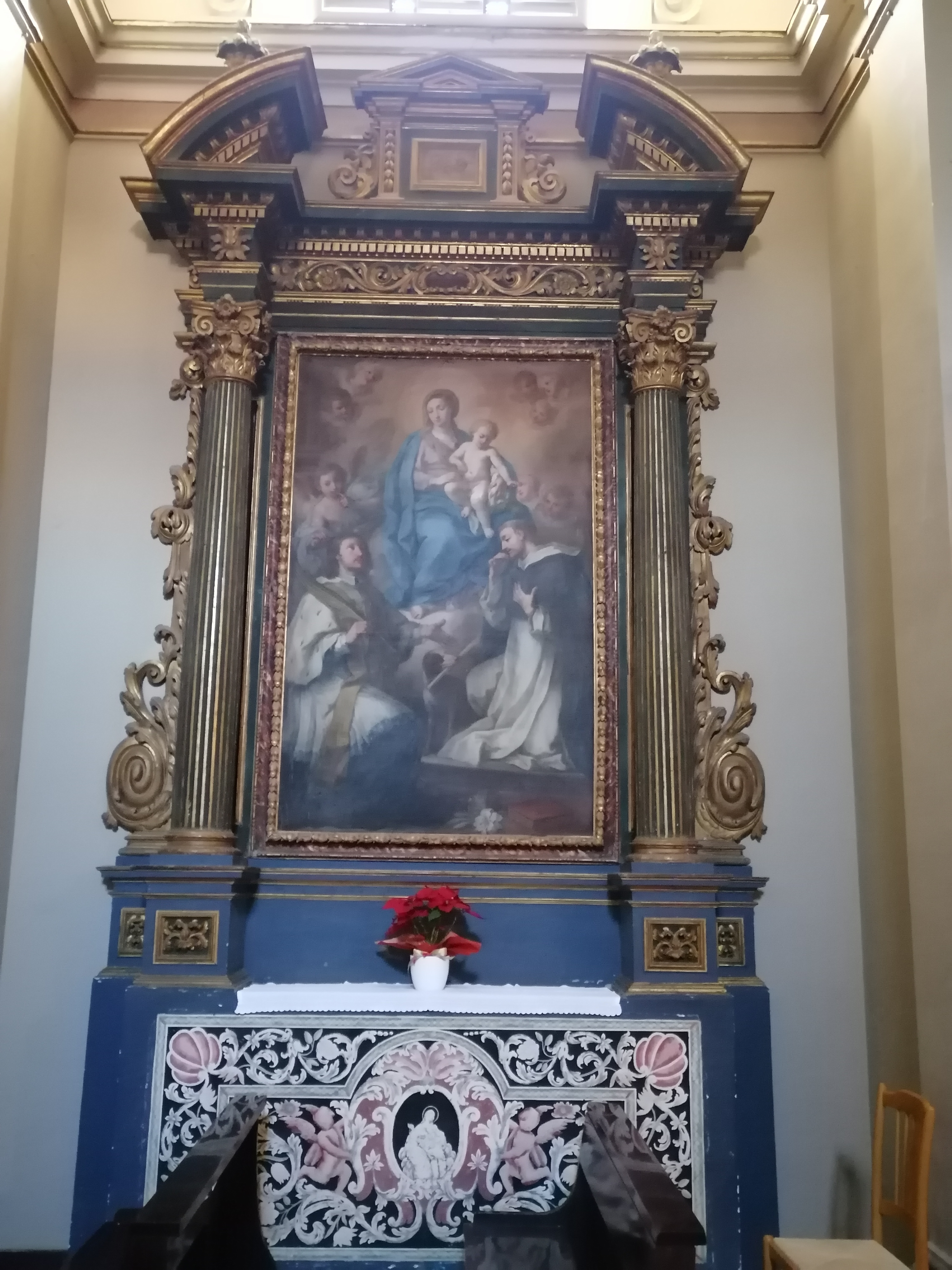
Madonna col Bambino e i Santi Domenico e Giovanni Nepomuceno, Santa Maria fuori, Monsano
