= Santi Quaranta Martiri e San Pasquale Baylon, Rome =

Santi Quaranta Martiri e San Pasquale Baylon
- Santi Quaranta
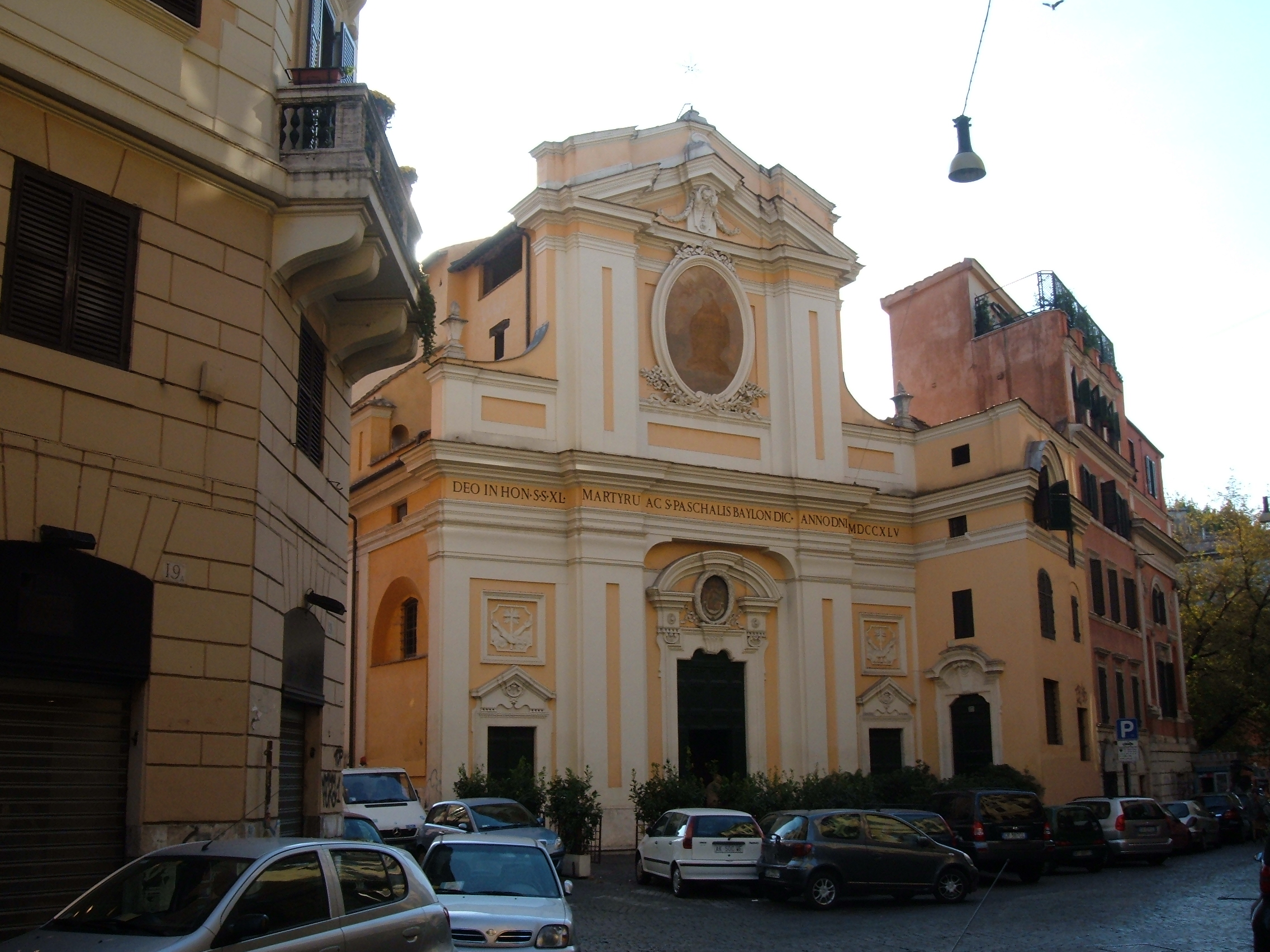
- Facade
- Click on the map for a fullscreen view
- 41°53′16″N 12°28′18″E
- Location: Via San Francesco a Ripa, Rome
- Country: Italy
- Denomination: Catholic
- Religious order: Franciscan Friars Minor

History
- Dedication: Forty Martyrs of Sebaste, and St Paschal Baylón

Architecture
- Architectural type: Church
- Style: Baroque
- Groundbreaking: 1122

Santi Quaranta Martiri e San Pasquale Baylon is a Franciscan Catholic church, built in a late-Baroque style, located on Via San Francesco a Ripa in the Rione Trastevere, Rome, Italy.

== History ==
The church was founded by Pope Callixtus II in 1122 and dedicated to the Forty Martyrs of Sebaste, persecuted under Emperor Licinius in 316. Tradition holds that they died overnight from exposure from being forced unclothed on to a frozen lake. The name of the church then was popularly the Santi Quaranta.

In the reign of Pope Alexander VI, it had a small hospital attached. Reconstructed in the fifteenth century, it was again restored in 1608 by the Arch-Confraternity of the Gonfalone. In 1736, it was sold to the Discalced Friars Minor of San Pietro d'Alcantara. Between 1736 and 1739, it was rebuilt by the architect Giuseppe Sardi. The friars dedicated the church to the Spanish priest, Pasquale or Pascual Baylón, but were obliged to retain the original dedication as well. Canonized in 1690, Baylon was the patron of cooks and pastry chefs. He was also invoked by unmarried women looking for a husband with a well-known rhyming prayer, which is why the church became known in Rome as Chiesa delle Zitelle, the "church of the spinsters"

The saint was also considered the protector of women married to abusive and violent men or who did not fulfill their conjugal duties: hence the legend that one of these women, after having prayed to him, had in a dream the vision of the saint who dictated a recipe, based on eggs and Marsala wine, which would have given back the due desire to her husband, a recipe that in his honor was first called " S.Bayon ", then " sanbaion " and finally "Zabaione".

The church was patronized by the Kingdom of Spain starting in 1738 in the reign of Philip V of Spain, and again by Isabella II of Spain in 1856. In 1739 a convent was added next door, which also served as a hospice and hospital.

The church is still maintained by the Spanish Alcantarine Franciscan order.

== Art ==
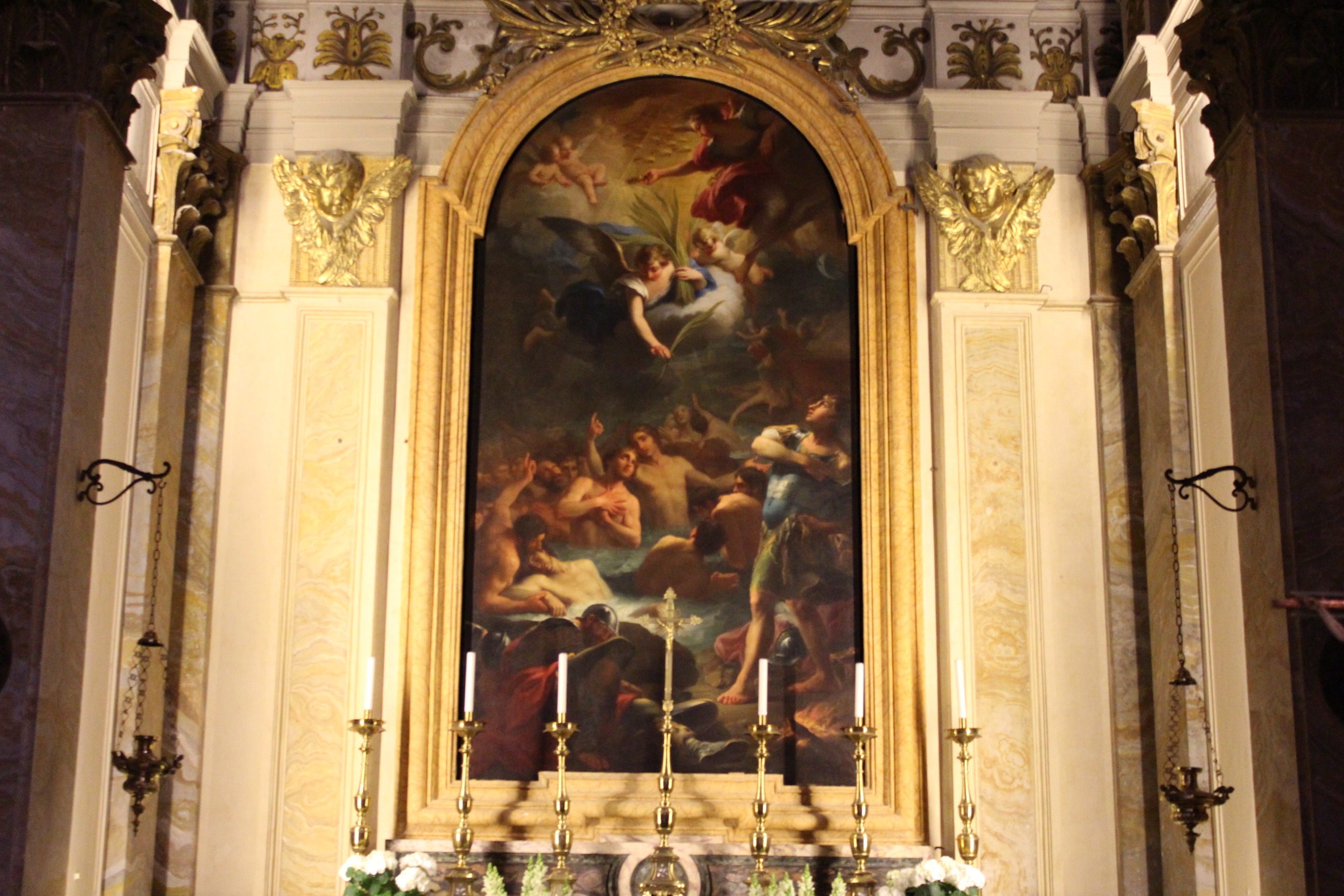
Angels Giving Palms of Martyrdom to the Forty Martyrs

The brick facade contains the heraldic shield of Philip V of Spain, who put the church under the patronage of the Spanish crown, an action which later spared the church from seizure by the Italian government in 1870. The upper part has an elliptical tondo depicting St Pasquale.

The ceilings are frescoed by Matteo Panaria and depicts in the nave, the Glory of San Pedro de Alcantara, while the transept crossing depicts Glory of San Pascual. The altarpiece over the main altar shows the "Martyrdom of the Forty Martyrs".

== Chapels ==
- Chapel of SS Anthony of Padua and Diego of Alcalá is the first chapel on the right and has an altarpiece depicting Our Lady of Pompeii.
- Chapel of St Peter of Alcantará is the second chapel on the right.
- Chapel of San Pasquale is the third chapel on the right, with an altarpiece by Salvadore Monosilio.
- Chapel of Blessed Juan de Prado, a Franciscan martyr, is the fourth chapel on the right at the transept. The altarpiece is by Panaria.
- Chapel of the Immaculate Conception is the first chapel on the left.
- Chapel of St. Francis, second on the left, has an altarpiece with St. Francis of Assisi receiving the stigmata.
- Chapel of the Holy Family is third on the left, with an altarpiece by Francisco Preciado.
- Chapel of St. John the Baptist is fourth on the left.

== Bibliography ==
- Christian Hülsen, Le chiese di Roma nel Medio Evo, Firenze 1927
- Le chiese di Roma dalle loro origini sino al secolo XVI., by Mariano Armellini, p. 569–570.
