= Tricomi =

Tricomi may refer to:

- 31189 Tricomi (1997 YZ7) Tricomi (asteroid 31189), Main-belt Asteroid
- Bartolommeo Tricomi (first half of 17th century), Italian painter of the Baroque period
- Euler–Tricomi equation, linear partial differential equation useful in the study of transonic flow
- Francesco Tricomi (1897–1978), Italian mathematician famous for his studies on mixed type partial differential equations
