= Francisco Preciado =

Spanish painter

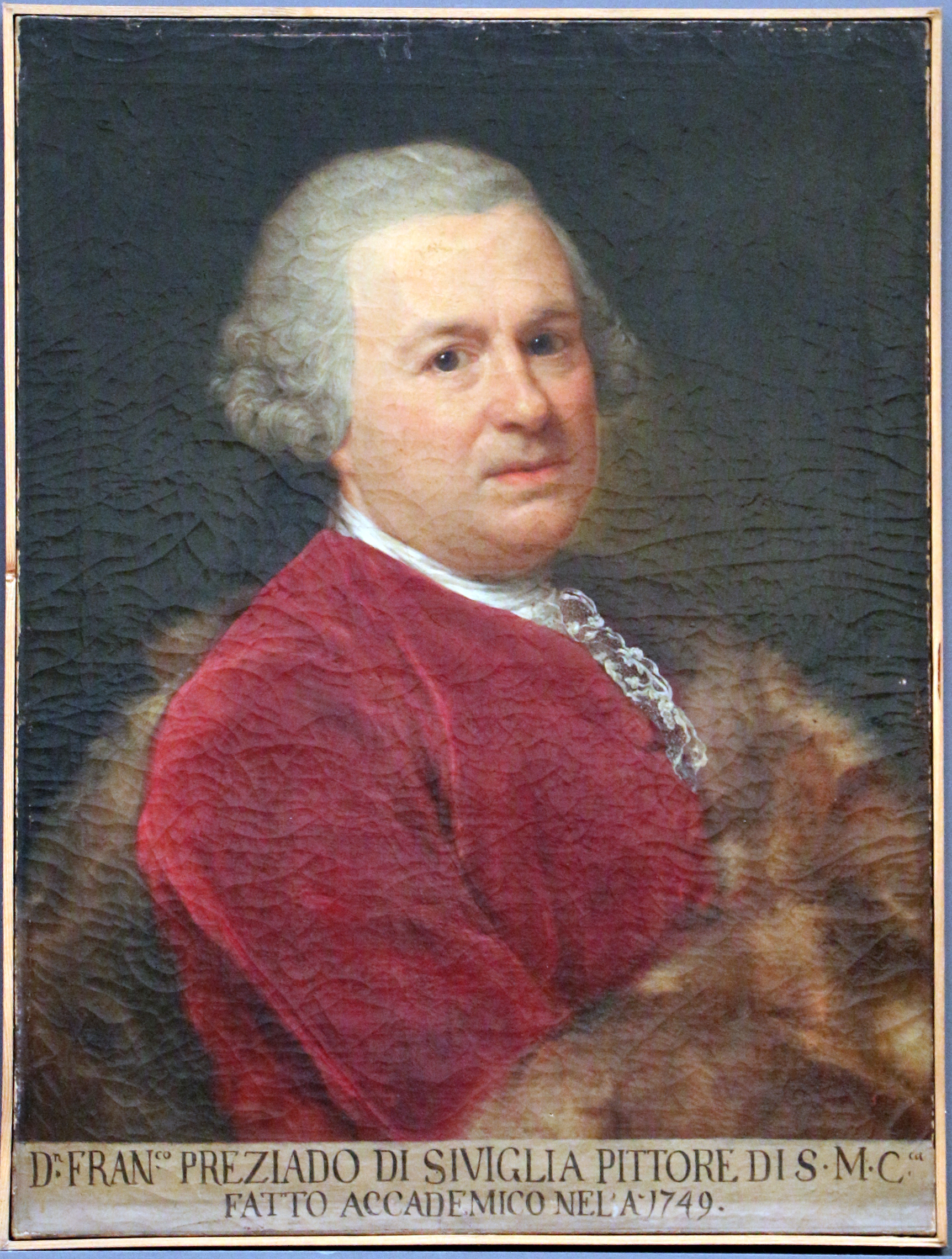
Portrait of Francisco Preciado de la Vega

Francisco Preciado de la Vega (1713–1789) was a Spanish painter, active mainly in Italy. He was involved in a number of artists' associations in Rome, both as a member and an officer.

== Life ==
Francisco Preciado was born in Écija, Spain, and initially trained with Domingo Martinez, but on the advice of court painter Francisco de Vieyra, he went to Rome in 1732, with sculptor Felipe de Castro.

There he entered the school of Sebastiano Conca. He painted some pictures in Rome, including a Holy Family for the church of Santi Quaranta Martiri e San Pasquale Baylon, Rome. Preciado painted both sacred subjects and portraits. Philip V granted him an annual pension of 500 ducats in 1740, a decision influenced by the recommendation of Spain's minister plenipotentiary in Rome, Cardinal Troiano Acquaviva d'Aragona.

Preciado was involved as a designer of machines or civil apparatus for the celebration of the Chinea festivities from 1744 to 1750, during which grand temporary structures were erected during the celebration all over Rome. He also collaborated on book projects.

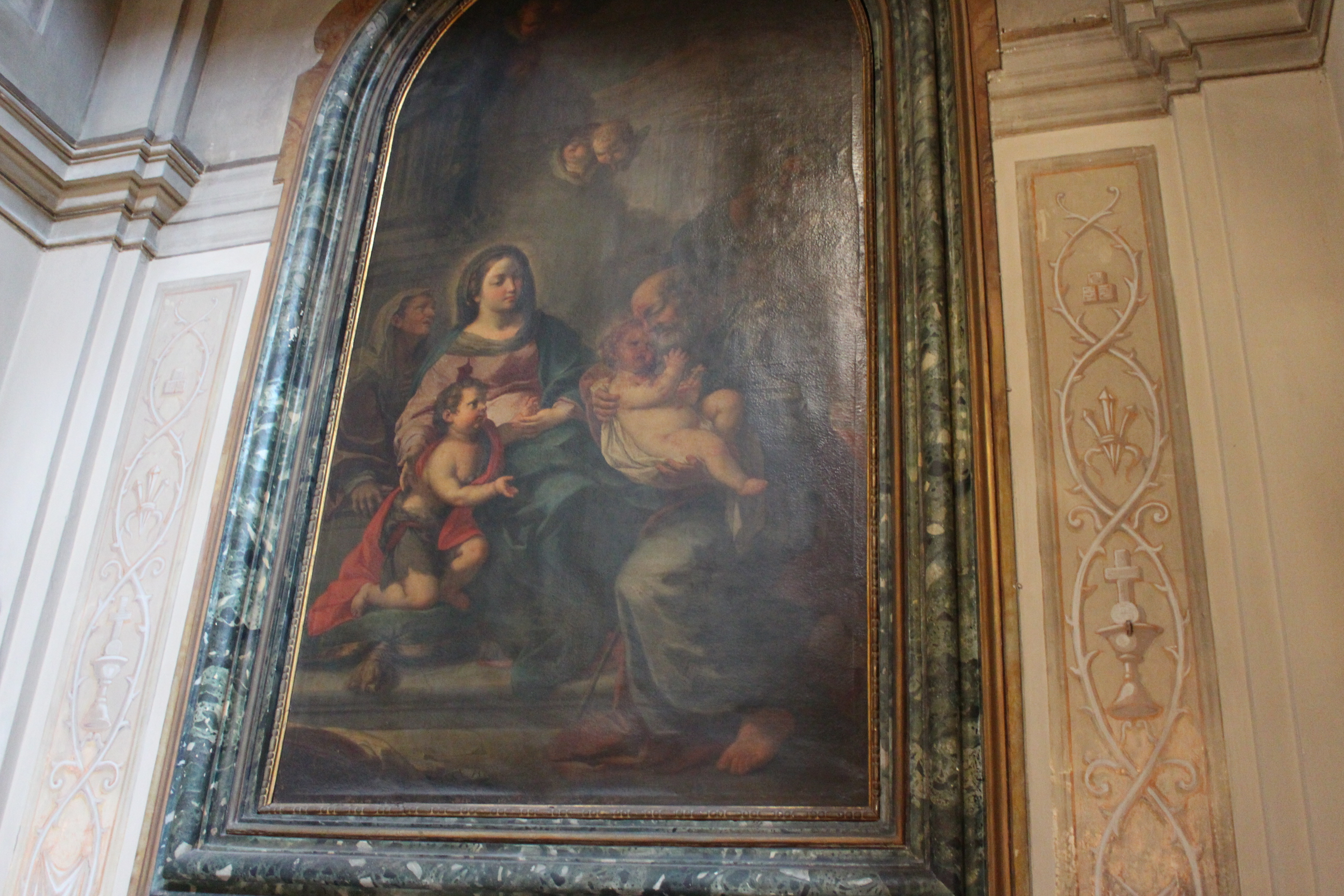
La Sacra Famiglia, (Santi Quaranta Martiri e San Pasquale Baylon)

In 1750, Preciado married Italian miniature painter, Caterina Cherubini. In 1758, he was appointed to Rome as the secretary of the Accademia di San Luca, due in part to reports he wrote about the functioning of the academies in Europe, and that should serve as the basis for the drafting of the statutes of the Madrid cenacle. As director, he sometimes managed to obtain small pensions for struggling Spanish artists newly arrived in Rome. He retained the post all his life.

In 1760, he was appointed for a time painter of the chamber (pintor de cámara) of King Ferdinand VI. He became principe of the Accademia di San Luca in Rome from 1764 to 1767. He was also a member of the Spanish Academia de San Fernando. Francesco Manno was one of his pupils.

Preciado wrote a treatise on painting: Arcadia Pittorica in 1788. Also that year, Preciado and his wife were inducted as honorary members of the Accademia Clementina in Bologna.

Francisco Preciado lived most of his life in Rome, where he died in 1789 and was buried at Santa Susanna.

== Works ==
Preciado de la Vega's career as a painter in Rome was closely linked to religious institutes and the Spanish diplomatic corps, in a very demanding and competitive artistic environment. Also, his involvement with various professional associations in Rome left him little time to paint. This is a partial list of known work.

- Miracle of Santa Casilda (1738)
- Allegory of Peace, (Real Academia de Bellas Artes de San Fernando)
- Allegory of History, (RABASF)
- The sacrifice of Jefte's daughter (1746), (RABASF)
- Judah and Tamar (1750), (RABASF)
- Mass of San Juan de Mata (1757)
- Virgen del Pilar with the Apostle Santiago and Saint Vicente Ferrer (1768) Santa Maria in Monserrato degli Spagnoli
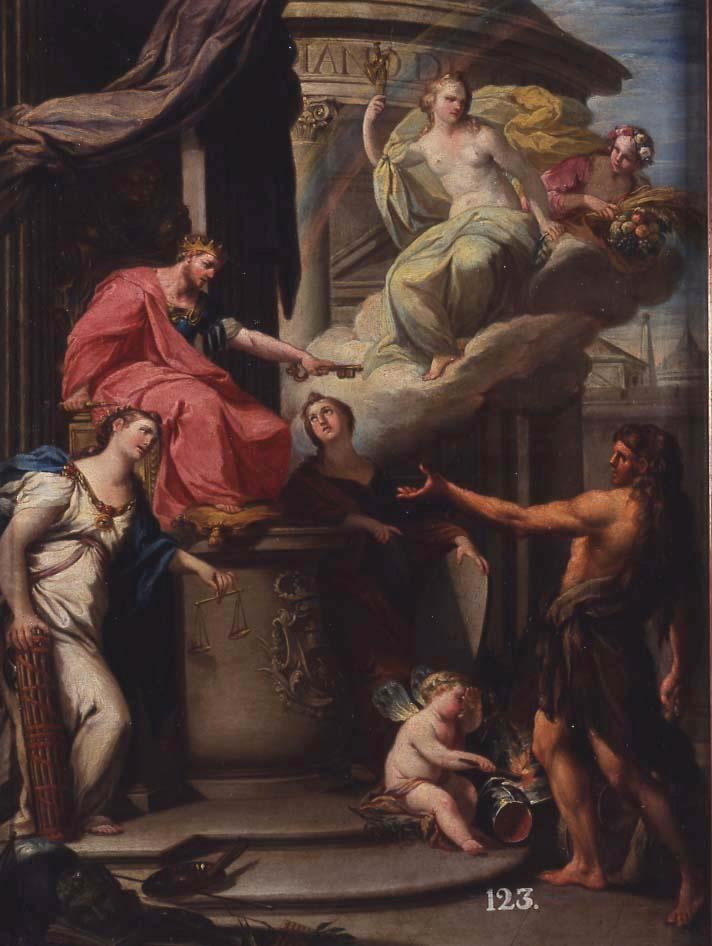
alegoria de la paz

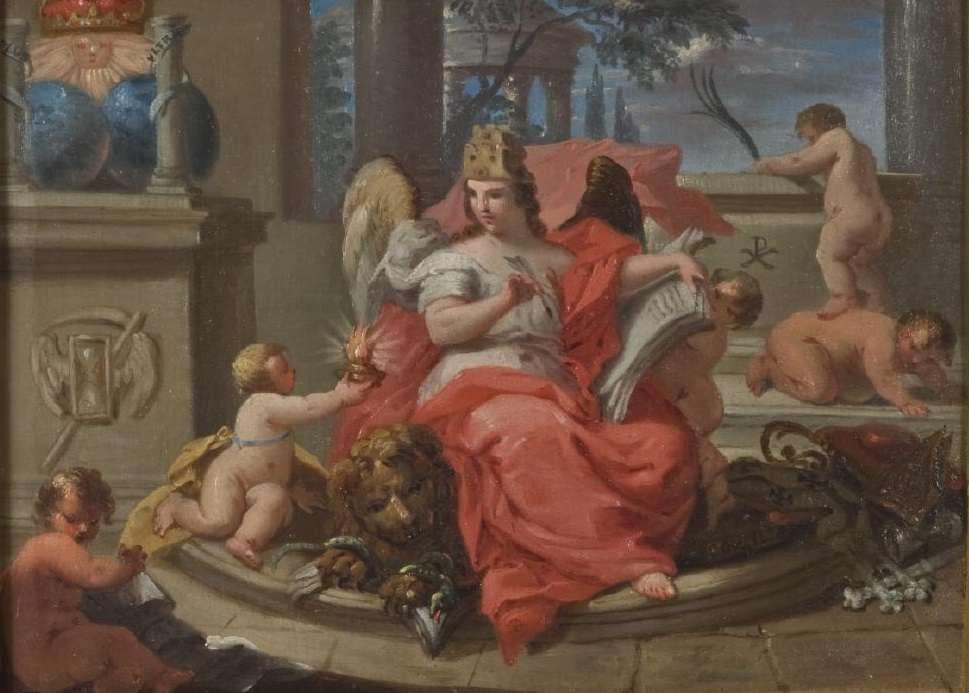
Alegoría de la Historia

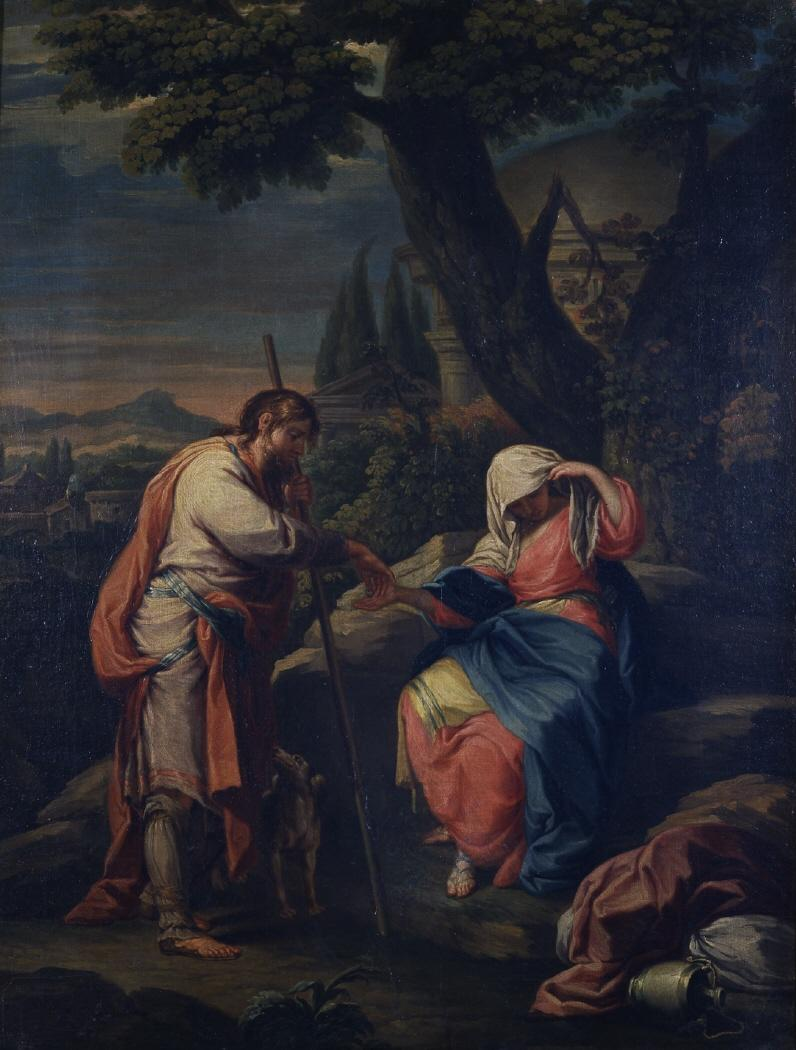
Judá y Tamar

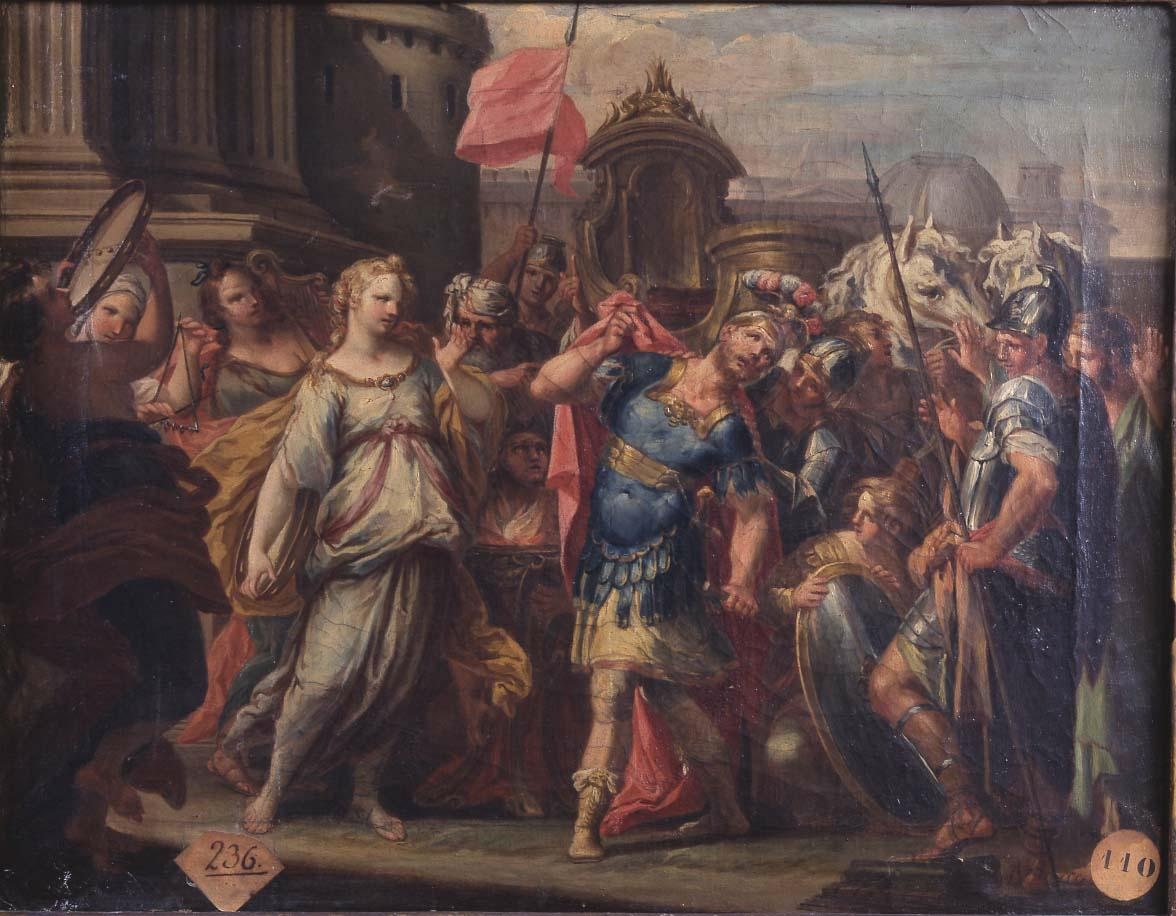
Sacrificio de la hija de Jefté
