= Bartolommeo Tricomi =

Italian painter

Bartolommeo Tricomi (first half of 17th century) was an Italian painter of the Baroque period. He was born in Messina. He was a pupil of Antonio Barbalonga, and was the teacher of Andrea Suppa. Tricomi is known as an excellent portrait painter.
