= Litterio Paladino =

Italian painter (1691–1743)

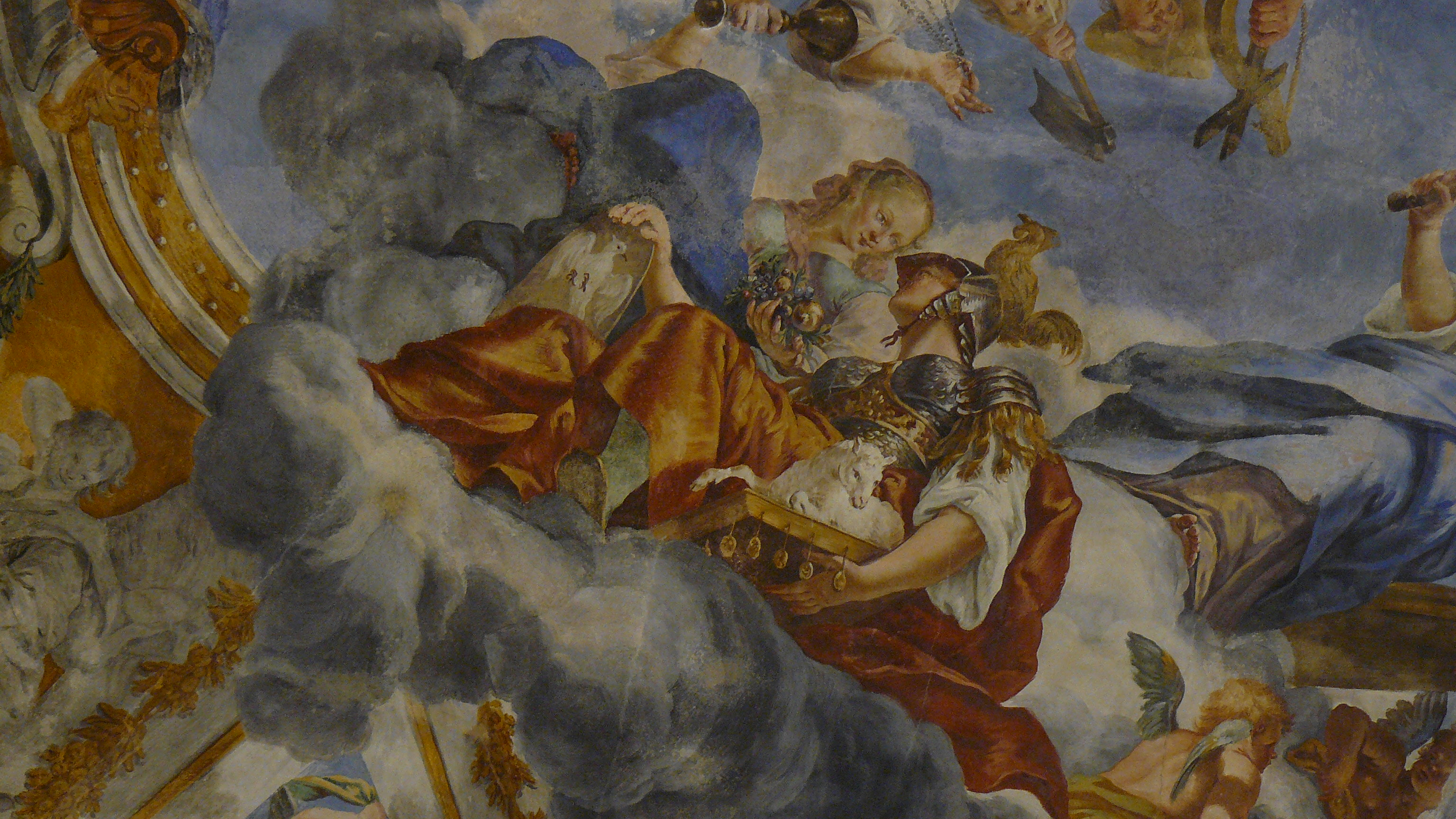
Fresco by Paladino in the church of San Francesco di Paola in San Pier Niceto (1726)

Litterio Paladino or Paladini (1691–1743) was an Italian painter of the 18th century, active in a late-Baroque style in Rome and his native Messina, Sicily. His first name is also spelled Letterio.

He was born and had initial training in Messina. He traveled to Rome at the age of 38 years. There he was said to have worked with Sebastiano Conca, but had an attachment to the earlier masters, Carracci, Correggio, and Raphael.

His masterwork are frescoes (1736) for the church of Montevergine in Palermo. He also painted for the church of San Biagio, Santa Elena, and the Church of the Rosary (1732) in Castanea delle Furie neighborhood of Messina. There are works by him in Zaffaria, in Sampiero di Monforte, in the church of San Francesco di Paola, and of the Santissimi Rosario. He also painted some canvases for the Monastery of Santa Barbara in Messina. He was also an engraver.

He died during the plague of 1743. His nephew, Giuseppe Paladino (1721-1794) was also a painter.
