= Santissima Annunziata dei Teatini, Messina =

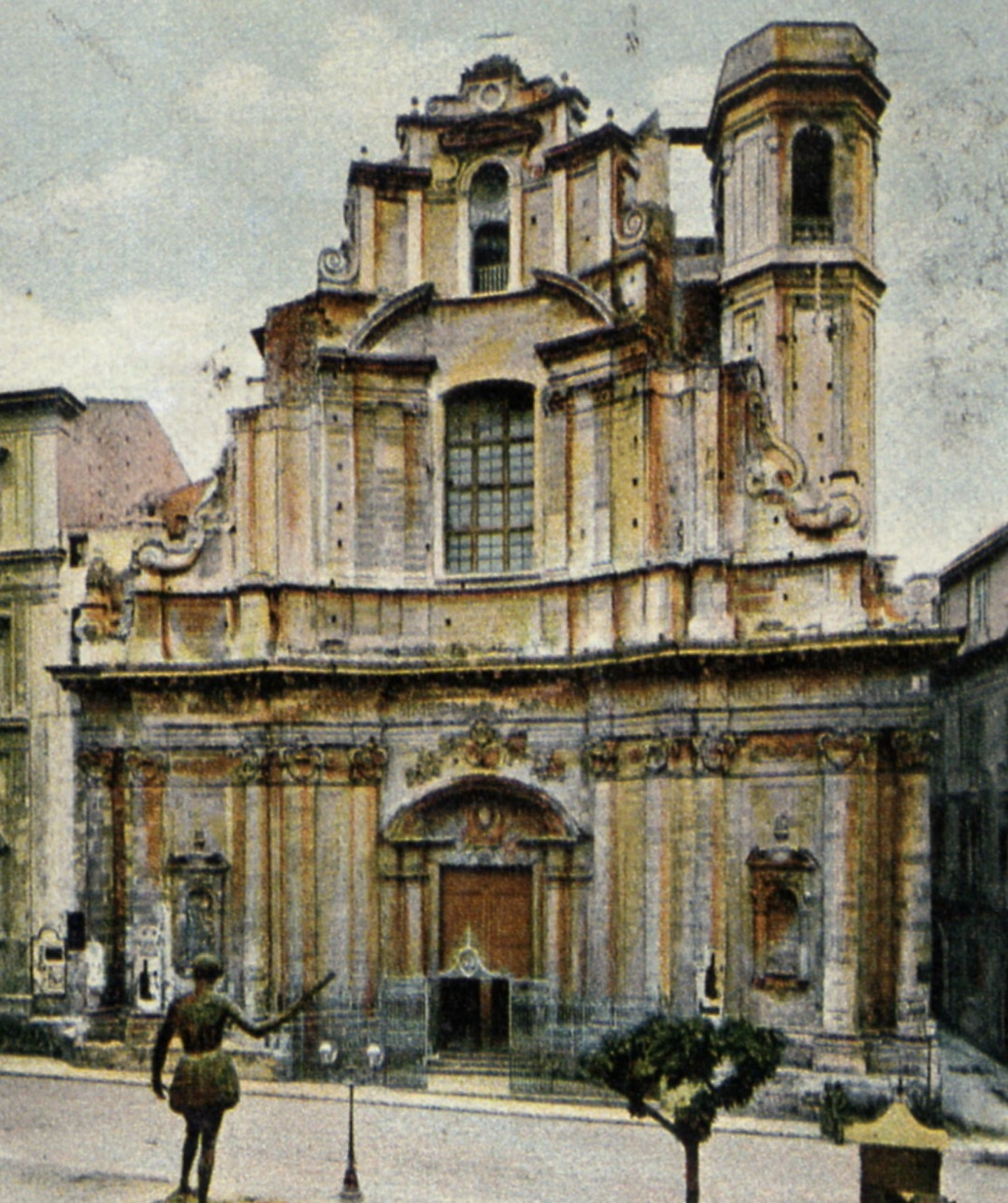
Former church of the Annunziata, before being destroyed by earthquake

The church and collage of the Santissima Annunziata dei Teatini was a Baroque structure designed by the Theatine priest and architect Guarino Guarini in the center of Messina, region of Sicily, Italy; the entire buildings were demolished after the 1908 Messina earthquake, and part of the site includes the present church of Sant'Antonio Abate.

== History ==
Theatine priest arrived in Messina by 1607. Initially linked to the distinct ancient church of Santissima Annunziata dei Catalani. Circa 1660, the Piedmontese theatine priest and architect was commissioned for designs for the church and adjacent college. The facade designed by Guarini is complex with a three-story concave front. The first floor pilasters were Corinthian order, the upper stories are more Doric in style. The facade ripples with friezes and the narrowing stories are linked by ripples of volutes. The second story central tympanum is interrupted and traverses into the upper story. The belltower is hexagonal in layout.

A guide from 1852 describes the nave ceiling frescoes were painted by Filippo Tancredi, while the apse ceiling was frescoed by Giuseppe Paladino. Around the altar and in the chapel of San Gregorio, were frescoes by Andrea Suppa. The altarpiece of the chapel of the Crucifixion was painted by Giovanni Fulco. The walls of the nave were painted in fresco by Giovanni Tuccari. All these works were lost with the earthquake.
