= Francesco Manno =

Italian painter (1754–1831)

Franceso Manno
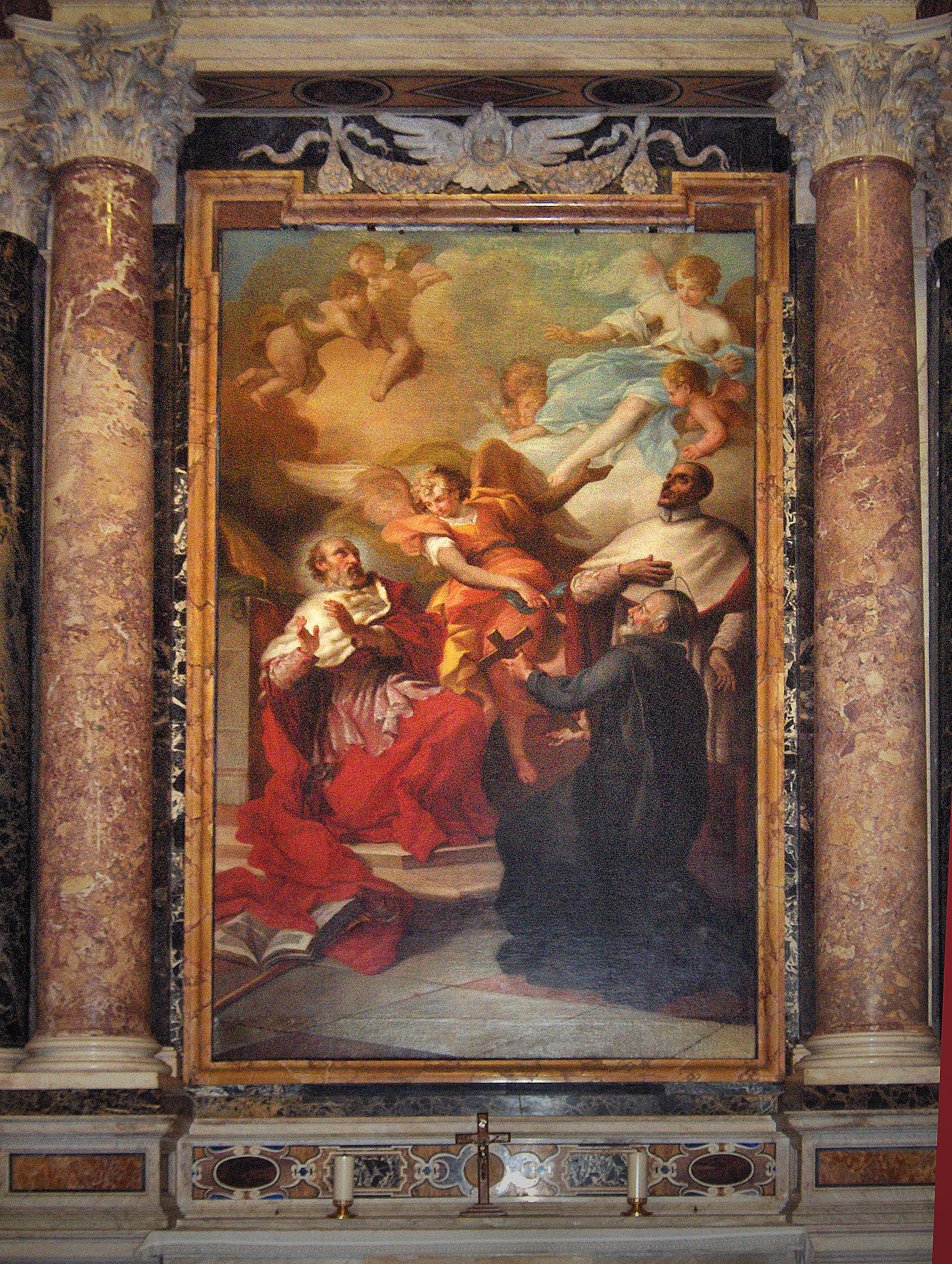
- Three Blessed Theatines", chapel of "Rucellai o Dei Beati, church Sant'Andrea della Valle, Rome
- Born: 20 December 1754; Palermo
- Died: 18 June 1831 (aged 76); Rome
- Education: Vito d'Anna
- Known for: Painting, architecture

Francesco Manno (20 December 1754 – 18 June 1831) was an Italian painter and architect of the Neoclassical style.

== Biography ==
Born at Palermo, where he was originally a goldsmith, but later devoted himself to painting, working along his older brothers, the painters Antonio and Vincenzo Manno. In 1786 he moved to Rome, initially working under Pompeo Batoni. then in the studio of Francesco Preziado de la Vega. Manno became the Secretary of the Accademia di San Luca. On 13 July 1794 he became a member of the Accademia dei Virtuosi del Pantheon. Favored by Pope Pius VI, Manno was appointed Painter of the Sacred Apostolic Buildings in 1800. He died in Rome in 1831.

== Major works ==
- Santi Apostoli: painting of "Descent of the Cross"
- Palazzo Altieri (1793): overdoor panels
- San Lorenzo in Lucina (1808): paintings celebrating the "Canonization of Saint Francis Caracciolo" and on decorations in the Chapel of Alaleona Ruspoli.
- Quirinal Palace (1812–1823): ceiling fresco in the Sala degli Ambasciatori (1822-3), depicting the Judgement of Solomon, with two flanking allegorical tondi.
- Santi Vincenzo e Anastasio a Trevi (1818): frescoes of the church vault.
- Palazzo Arcivescovile, Monreale (1830): frescoes of some rooms.
