= Santa Maria in Trivio =

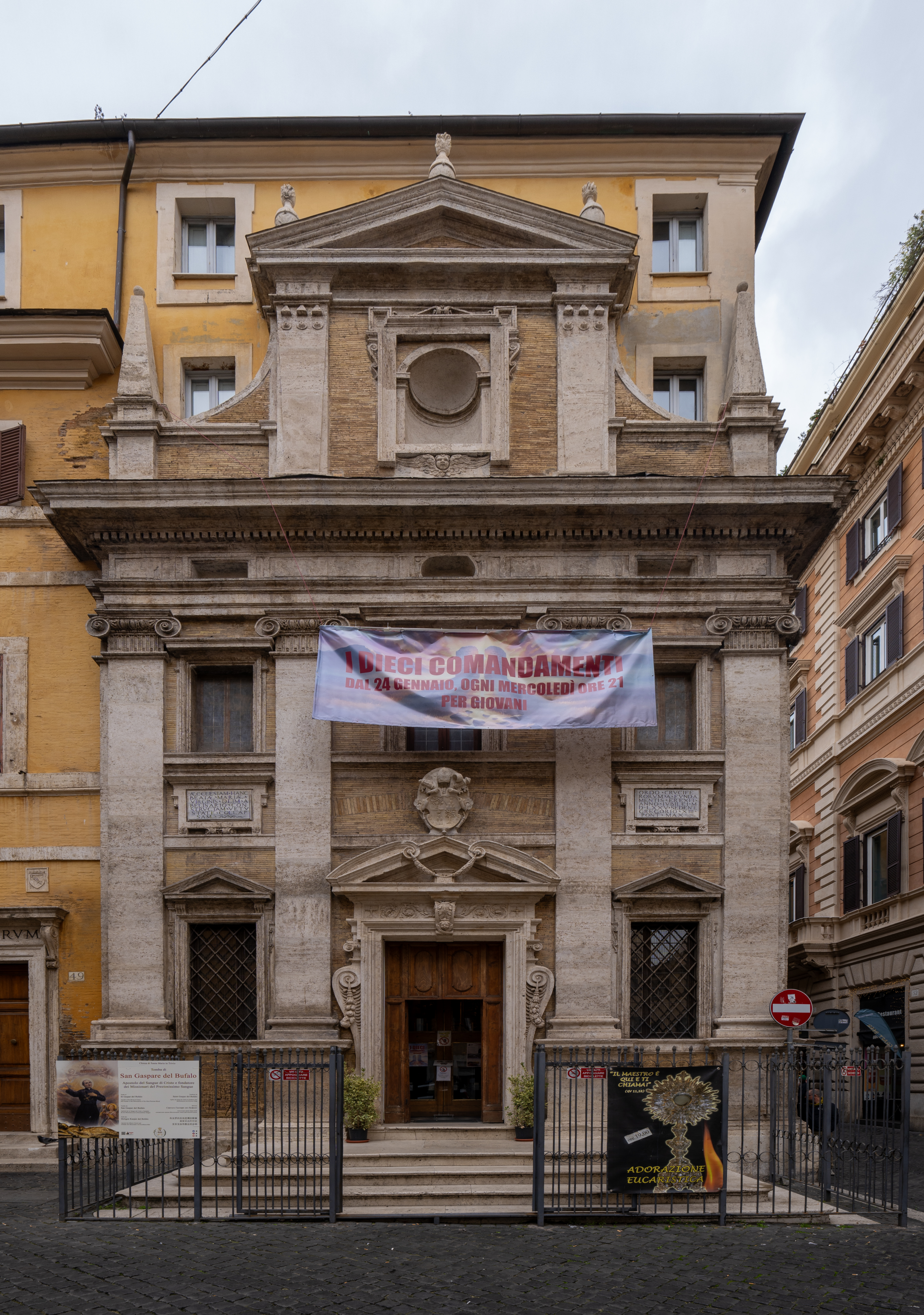
- Santa Maria in Trivio
- Click on the map for a fullscreen view
- 41°54′04″N 12°28′57″E
- Location: Piazza dei Crociferi, Rome
- Country: Italy
- Denomination: Roman Catholic

History
- Dedication: Mary, mother of Jesus

Architecture
- Architectural type: Church
- Groundbreaking: 6th century

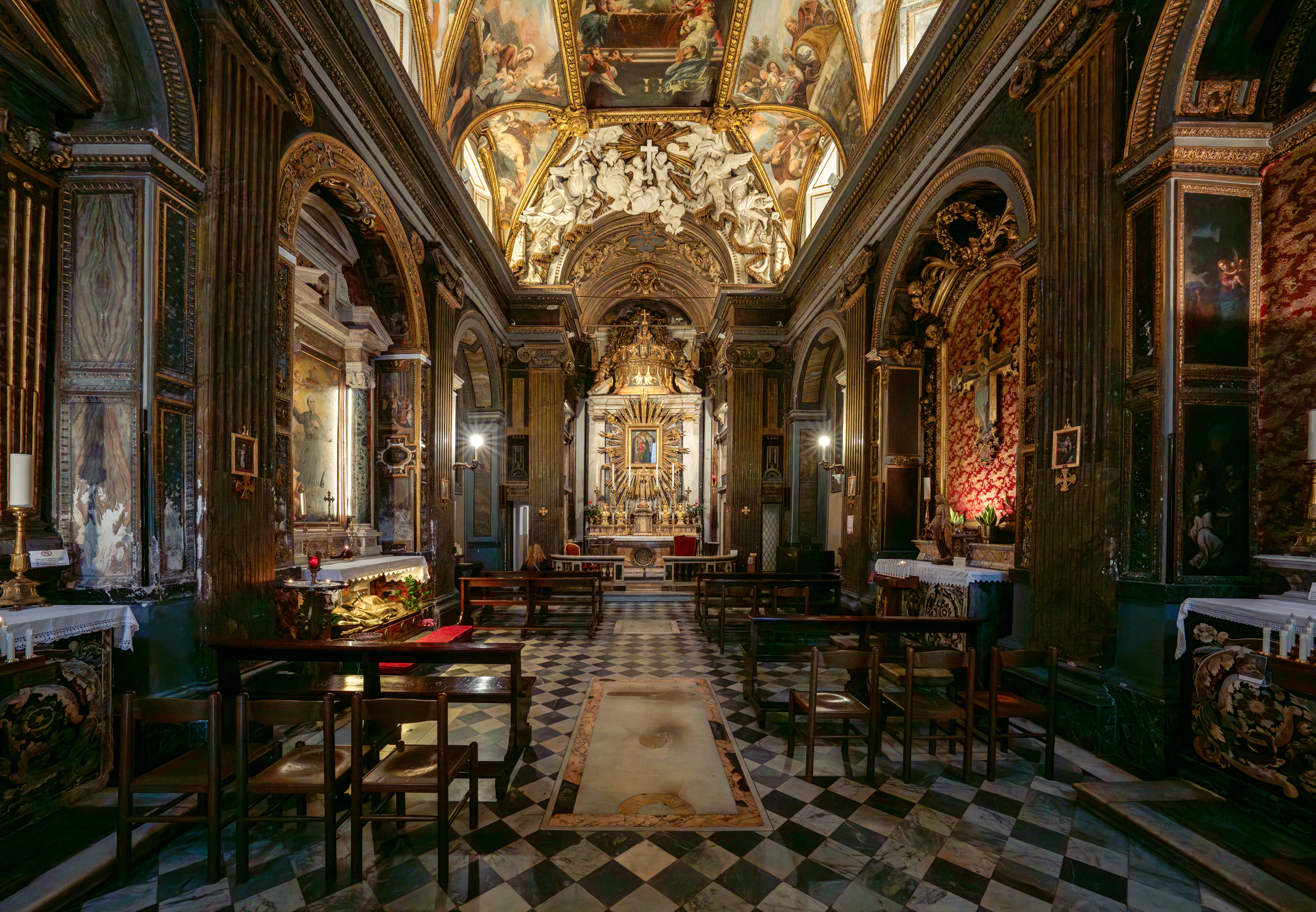
interior

Santa Maria in Trivio is a church in Rome. It is dedicated to Mary, mother of Jesus, and is located on Piazza dei Crociferi in rione Trevi. It is near the Fountain of Trevi.

In Mariano Vasi's 19th-century guidebook, the church is referred to as Santa Maria a Trevi. According to tradition, the church was founded by the Byzantine general Belisarius in the 6th century. Allegedly, he found the church to expiate for deposing Pope Silverius in 537. Previously the church had been known as Santa Maria in Fornica. This was recorded in an 11th-century inscription on the wall of the church.

In 1571 the church was given to the Order of the Crociferi. Between 1573 and 1575 the architect Giacomo del Duca rebuilt the church, designing e.g. the innovative pediment above the entrance door.

The crucifix in the chapel was decorated by Giovanni Francesco Bolognese. The altarpiece of St Camillo de Lellis was painted by Gasparo Serenari. The main altarpiece was painted by Bartolommeo Morelli. Other altarpieces in side altars were by the studio of Palma il Giovane, Luigi Scaramuccia, and Pietro Perugino. The ceiling was painted by Antonio Gherardi.
