= Antonio Gherardi =

Italian painter

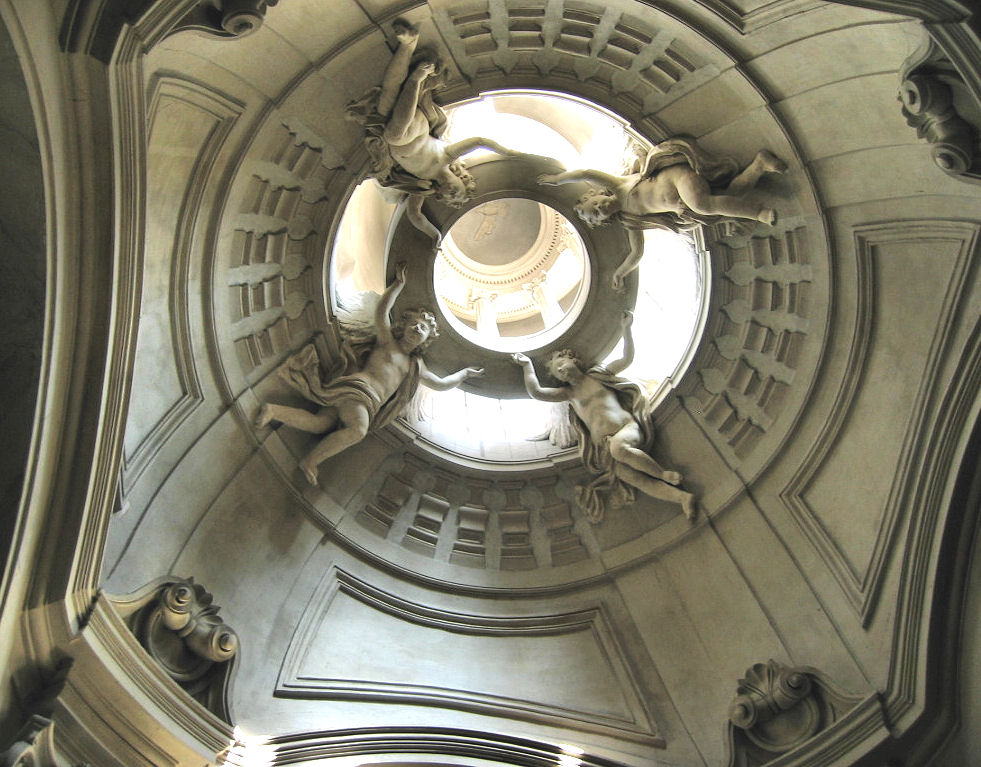
Cappella Avila, Santa Maria in Trastevere

Antonio Gherardi (Il Reatino) (20 September 1638 – 10 May 1702) was an Italian painter, architect, and sculptor (stuccoist) of the Baroque style, active mainly in and near Rome and his native city of Rieti.

== Life ==
Antonio was born in Rieti to Stefano and Giulia Poggi Tatoti, but when he moved to Rome (c. 1656) he changed his name. His father, a middle-class craftsman, died when Antonio was only eight years old. In 1656, Monsignor Bulgarino Bulgarini, Governor of Rieti, became his patron. Two years later Bulgarini sponsored his travel to Rome, and introduced him to his future mentors, Pier Francesco Mola and Pietro da Cortona. In the large workshops organized by the latter, he developed skills in both painting and stucco decoration. The influence of Cortona on Gherardi was so significant that many of his first paintings were attributed to the old master.

Between 1667 and 1669 Gherardi travelled extensively in northern Italy. Upon his return to Rome, he painted the vaulted ceiling in Santa Maria in Trivio. In 1674, he joined the Accademia di San Luca. That same year he began work on scenes from the life of St.Francesco Solano for the Astalli Chapel at Santa Maria in Ara Coeli.

Gherardi drew freely on forms and ideas of Bernini, Borromini, and Cortona. The best examples of his work can be seen in the Santa Cecilia Chapel, San Carlo ai Catinari, and the Avila Chapel, Santa Maria in Trastevere (c.1679), two of the most architecturally inventive chapels of the late-17th century in Rome.

In 1698 he was appointed architect and painter of the chapel of Santa Teresa in Santa Maria in Traspontina, which still preserves a painting of the Ecstasy of Santa Teresa.

== Work ==
Among his works are

- The decoration of the vault of Santa Maria in Trivio, Scenes from the Life of the Virgin, (1668–1670)
- Birth of the Virgin in the Duomo of Gubbio
- Death of Blessed Francesco (1675) and architecture, Chapel of the Blessed Francesco Solano in Santa Maria in Aracoeli, Rome).
- Education of the Virgin (c. 1675, 2nd chapel on left of Duomo of Poggio Mirteto).
- Holy family with young John the Baptist, (c. 1675, Duomo of Monterotondo).
- Scenes from the Life of Esther, (1673–1674, Palazzo Naro, Rome)
- Crucifixion, (1674–1686, Santi Claudio e Andrea dei Borgognoni, Rome, lost).
- Vision of S. Filippo Neri & S. Camillo de Lellis heals dying Crescenzi family member, (1677, sacristy, Santa Maria in Trivio).
- Stucco for main altar (1677, Santa Maria in Trivio).
- The miracle of Holy Shroud & Christ lying on Shroud with Donors from House of Savoy and Sts. Massimo & Maurizio, Blessed Amedeo, Margherita & Ludovica, (1680–1682, Altarpiece, Santissimo Sudario dei Piemontesi; payment 140 scudi).
- Saint Jerome penitent in desert, (1680, painted to substitute for painting by Durante Alberti) and the architecture of the Avila chapel in Santa Maria in Trastevere
- Santa Cecilia (1692) and the architecture of the Santa Cecilia Chapel (1695–1700) in San Carlo ai Catinari
- Ecstasy of Saint Theresa (1698, Santa Maria in Traspontina, Rome).
- Immaculate Conception for church of Sant'Antonio al Monte, Rieti.
- Ephemeral funerary decorations for Alfonso di Portugal in Sant'Antonio dei Portoghesi, also others to celebrate the extirpation of Calvinism in France.
