= Giovanni Fulco =

Italian painter

Giovanni Fulco (1615 – c. 1680) was an Italian painter of the Baroque period.

== Biography ==
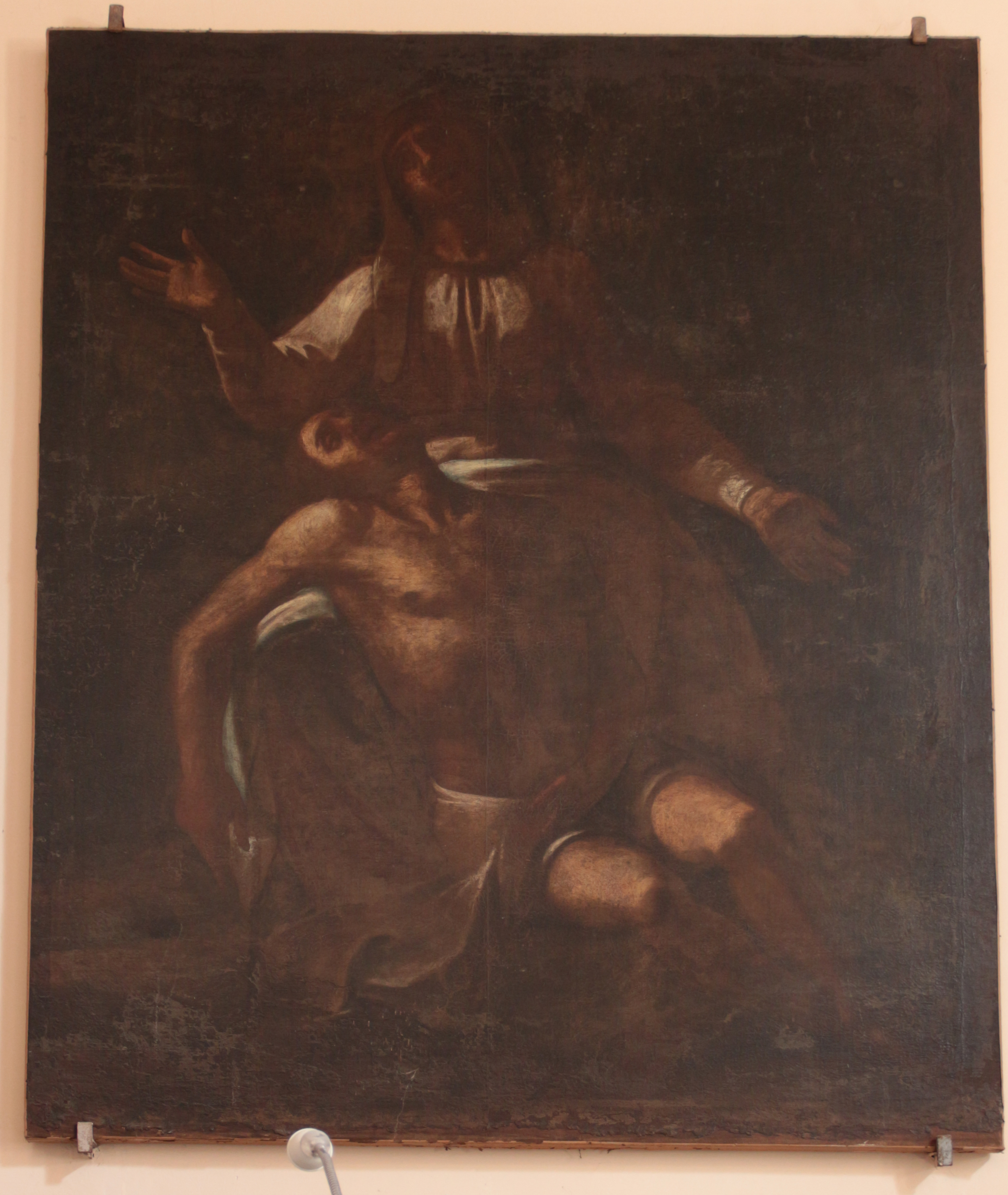

He was born in Messina. After having learned the first principles of design there, he went to Naples, where he entered the school of Cavalière Massimo Stanzione. He excelled particularly in the representation of children. Many of his pictures have been destroyed by the earthquakes. This includes his Birth of the Virgin in the chapel of the Crucifixion at the Nunziata de'Teatini at Messina. During 1674–1679, he frescoed the choir of the church of Santi Pietro e Paolo in Acireale, presently somewhat restored. He died in poverty in Rome.
