= Antonio Bova =

Italian painter (1641–1701)

Antonio Bova (1641- 15 October 1701) was an Italian painter, active mainly in Sicily.

== Biography ==
He was born in Messina, Sicily. His father intended for him to become a priest, but he then trained with Giovanni Battista Quagliata, then with Andrea Suppa. However, in a brawl, he is said to have murdered a rival and sought refuge first in the church of St Francis of Assisi, then in the Benedictine monastery of Santa Maria Maddalena, where he took the habit and lived for the rest of his life.

He painted mostly frescoes, many of which were destroyed in the earthquakes that afflicted Messina in 1783 and 1908. He also painted ten highly admired large canvases in 1682 for the Cathedral of Messina, now also lost. Among the few remaining paintings by Bova in Messina are: the Martyrdom of San Placido and Death of St Benedict in church of Santa Maria Maddalena; St John Evangelist in Chapel of Palazzo Reale; a Virgin with Saints Benedict and Bernard in church of the Monastery of Sant’Anna; and Vergine Addolorata and St John now in Museo Regionale di Messina.

Among his paintings outside of Messina are: St Cajetan of Thiene found in the church of the Santissima Annunciazione, Randazzo; Adoration by Shepherds and Magi in the church of San Giuseppe in Palermo, and a St Michael Archangel in the church of San Michele at Palazzolo Acreide.
