= Placido Campolo =

Italian painter (1693–1743)

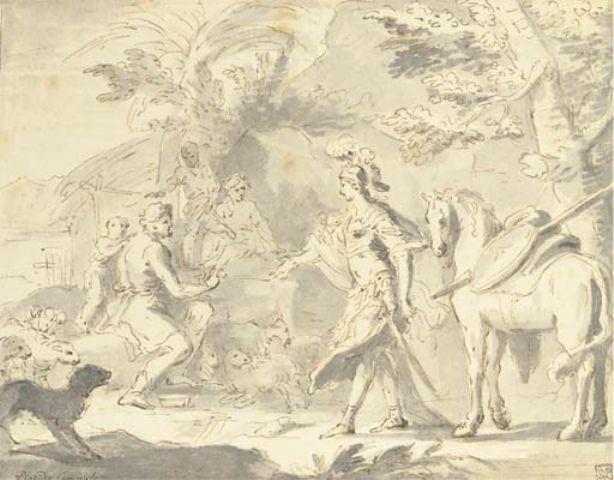
Placido Campolo, Herminie chez les Bergers.

Placido Campolo (1693–1743) was an Italian painter of the late-Baroque period, a native of Messina in Sicily. In Rome, he was the pupil of the painter Sebastiano Conca; in 1731, he returned to Messina to paint the Galleria del Senato. He died of plague in 1743.

He painted for the cathedral and the church of Sant'Angelo de Rossi (Defeat of the Fallen Angels). He also helped to design the entrances and steps to the church of Monte di Pieta degli Azzurri.

Campolo has an entry in the Benezit Dictionary of Artists.
