= Gasparo Serenari =

Italian painter

Gasparo Serenari (active 1760) was an Italian painter of the 18th century, active in Rome and his native Palermo.

== Biography ==
He was a pupil of Sebastiano Conca in Rome. He painted altarpieces for the churches of Santa Maria in Trivio and Santa Maria Maddalena in Rome. He was knighted for his work, and appears to have become a cleric. He returned to Palermo where he painted mainly in churches, including that of the Jesuits and the monastery of La Carita.
