= Caterina Cherubini =

Italian artist (died 1811)

Caterina Cherubini (died 1811) was an Italian miniature painter.

Cherubini, active for much of her career in Rome, was named a member of the Accademia di San Luca in 1760; the Accademia contains in its collection an anonymous oil portrait of her. She is said to have worked in pastel during her career. Her husband, whom she married in 1750, was the Spanish painter Francesco Preciado de la Vega. She is said to have been a poet as well.

In 1788, Caterina Cherubini and her husband were inducted as honorary members of the Accademia Clementina in Bologna.
