= Andrea Suppa =

Italian painter

Andrea Suppa (1628–1671) was an Italian painter and architect.

== Biography ==
He was born in Messina, Sicily. He trained in Messina under Bartolomeo Tricomi and later under the Flemish painter Abraham Casembroot (1594–1658), who had moved to Messina. Other local pupils of Casembroot included Filippo Giannetto and Domenico Guargena. A pupil of Suppa was Antonio Bova. Many of Suppa's works were destroyed by the 1908 earthquake. He helped design the Sanctuary of Montevergine (1654) in Messina. He painted the frescoes in the chapel of St. Gregory in the church of the Santissima Annunziata dei Teatini in Messina. He also helped design the stained glass windows for the church of San Domenico in Messina. He painted frescoes for the Oratory of St. Francis, attached to the Church of San Domenico.
