= Salvadore Monosilio =

Italian painter

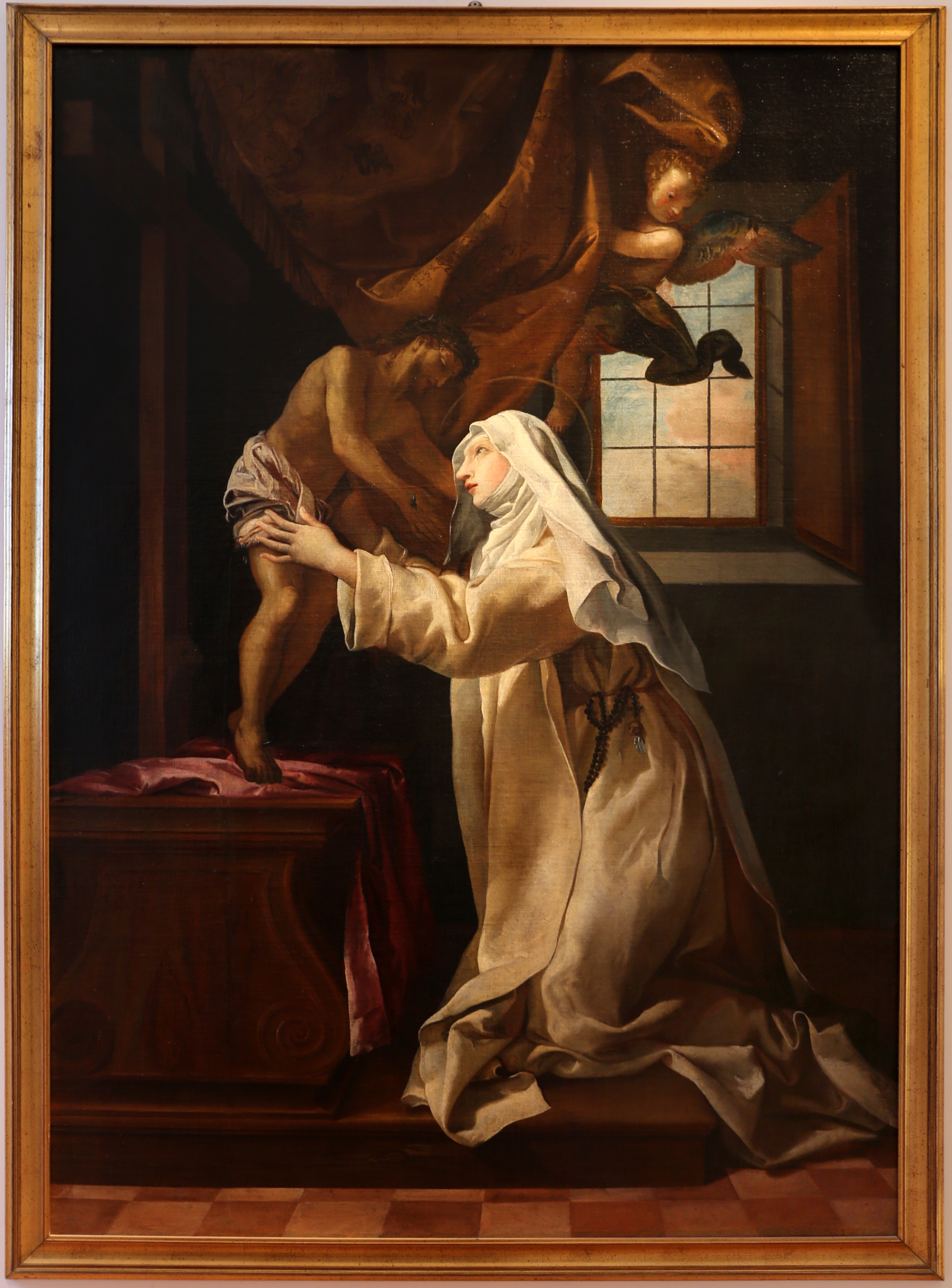
Miracle of Saint Caterina de' Ricci

Salvatore Monosilio was an Italian painter of the 18th century, active in a late-Baroque style in Rome.

== Biography ==
He was born and had initial training in Messina, Sicily. But traveled to Rome to be a pupil of Sebastiano Conca. He remained in Rome, painting the ceiling of a chapel in the church of San Paolo alla Regola. For the School of the Padre Pie, he painted a St Giuseppe Calasanzio receives stigmata. He painted a San Pasquale Baylon for the third chapel in the church of Santi Quaranta Martiri e San Pasquale Baylon. He also painted in Ascoli Piceno. He restored some portraits of popes in the Vatican collections under the direction of the canon Marangoni. He sent to Messina two canvases for the Jesuits and a depiction of the titular saint for San Andrea Avellino. His works were incised by Michele Sorello.
