= Sebastiano Conca =

Italian painter (1680–1764)

- Sebastiano Conca; lithograph by Gabriel Decker (1842, possibly from a self-portrait)
- Born: 8 January 1680; Gaeta, Kingdom of Naples
- Died: September 1, 1764 (aged 84); Naples, Kingdom of Naples
- Known for: Painting
- Movement: Baroque

Sebastiano Conca The Holy Family with the Infant Saint John the Baptist, oil on canvas

Sebastiano Conca (8 January 1680 – 1 September 1764) was an Italian Baroque painter.

== Biography ==
He was born at Gaeta, then part of the Kingdom of Naples, and apprenticed in Naples under Francesco Solimena. In 1706, along with his brother Giovanni, who acted as his assistant, he settled in Rome, where for several years he worked only in chalk, to improve his drawing. He was patronized by the Cardinal Ottoboni, who introduced him to Clement XI, who commissioned him a well-received Jeremiah painted for the church of St. John Lateran. He also painted an Assunta for the church of Santi Luca e Martina in Rome.

Conca was knighted by the pope. He collaborated with Carlo Maratta in the Coronation of Santa Cecilia (1721–1724) in the namesake church of Santa Cecilia in Trastevere. In 1718 he was elected to the Accademia di San Luca, and was its director in 1729–1731, replacing Camillo Rusconi as Principe in 1732. He was also elected Principe in 1739–1741.

His painting was strongly influenced by the Baroque painter Luca Giordano. Among Conca's pupils there were Pompeo Battoni, Andrea Casali, Placido Campoli, Corrado Giaquinto, Gregorio Giusti, Gaetano Lapis, Salvatore Monosilio, Litterio Paladini, Francesco Preziao, Rosalba Maria Salvioni, Gasparo Serenari, Agostino Masucci, Domenico Giomi, and the Bavarian religious painter Franz Georg Hermann. Sebastiano's brother, Giovanni Conca (died in 1764), painted the main altarpiece of the Madonna of the Rosary and St Dominic for the church of San Domenico, Urbino.

He received widespread official acclaim and patronage. He worked for a period of time for the Savoy family in Turin on the Oratory of San Filippo and Santa Teresa, in the Venaria (1721–1725), for Basilica di Superga (1726), and Royal Palace (1733). He painted the frescoes of Probatica (Pool of Siloam), in the Ospedale di Santa Maria della Scala (hospital) of Siena. In Genoa, he painted the large allegorical canvases of the Palazzo Lomellini-Doria Lamba (1738–1740).

In 1739, he published a guide to painting: Ammonimenti (or Admonishments), which blended moralistic advice with technique. He returned to Naples in 1752, and enjoyed the royal patronage of Charles III. His studio was prodigious and he painted frescoes for the Church of Santa Chiara (1752–1754), five canvases for the Chapel in Caserta Palace (now lost), as well as many others including for the Benedictines of Aversa (1761), a History of Saint Francis of Paola for the Sanctuary of Saint Maria di Pozzano of Castellammare di Stabia (1762–1763), and many other altarpieces. He died in Naples on 1 September 1764.

Among the works that reflect his late-Baroque style there are paintings such as The Vision of Aeneas in the Elysian Fields (c. 1735/1740); the scene is crowded with mythologic and classical figures, adrift in academic quotation, and enveloped by a world of overwrought with allegory. Dancing or flying putti proliferate. The landscape is often a billowing cloud.

Even in a more intimate scene such as Rinaldo & Armida, instead of depicting the focused scene between two lovers, love itself has to be allegorized as an intruding, hovering cupid. Similarly, the somber introspection of the moment recounted by Christ at the Garden of Gesthmane is afflicted with a cascade of angels. It is a mannerist Baroque, not its distilled apotheosis, but a distanced elaboration from its roots in Carracci and Cortona.

== Gallery ==
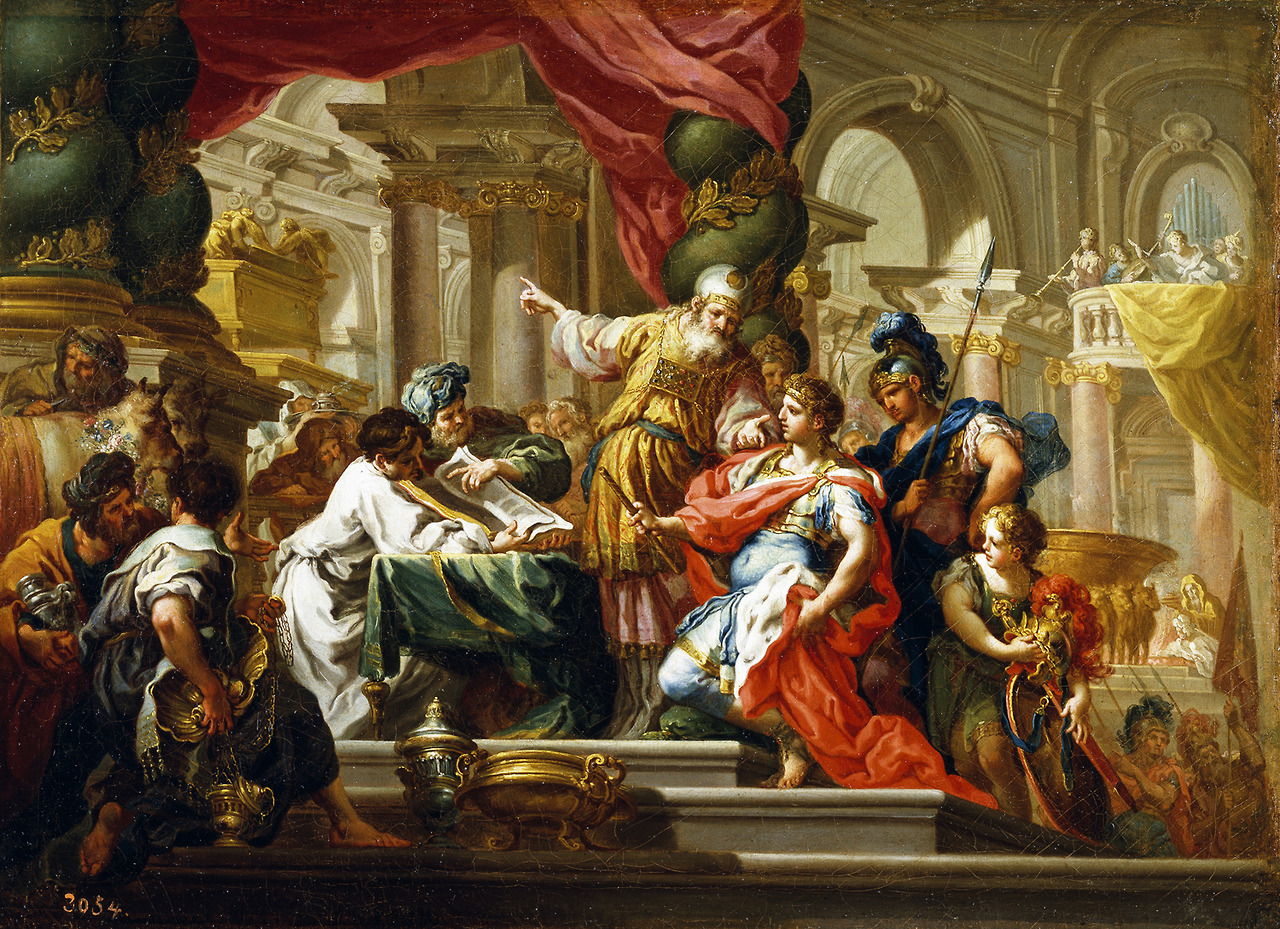
Alexander the Great in the Temple of Jerusalem, between 1735 and 1737, oil on canvas, 52 x 70 cm, Museo del Prado, Madrid

The Presentation of Christ in the Temple, oil on canvas, 76 x 101 cm, Museo Nacional de Bellas Artes de La Habana

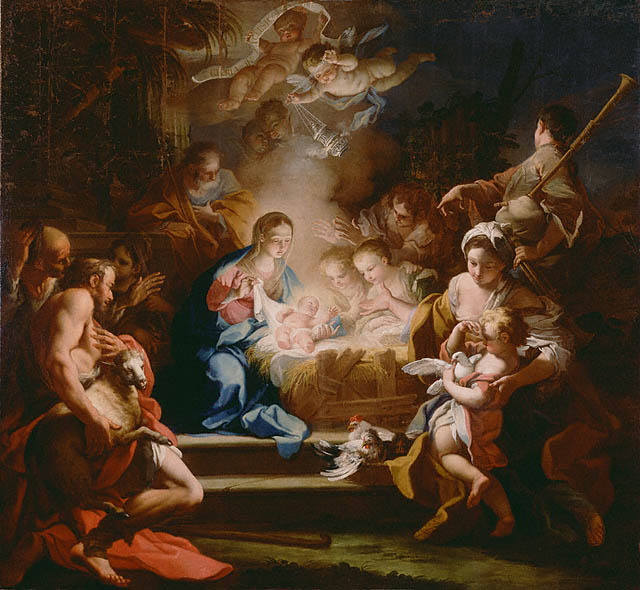
Adoration of the Shepherds, 1720, Getty Center, Los Angeles

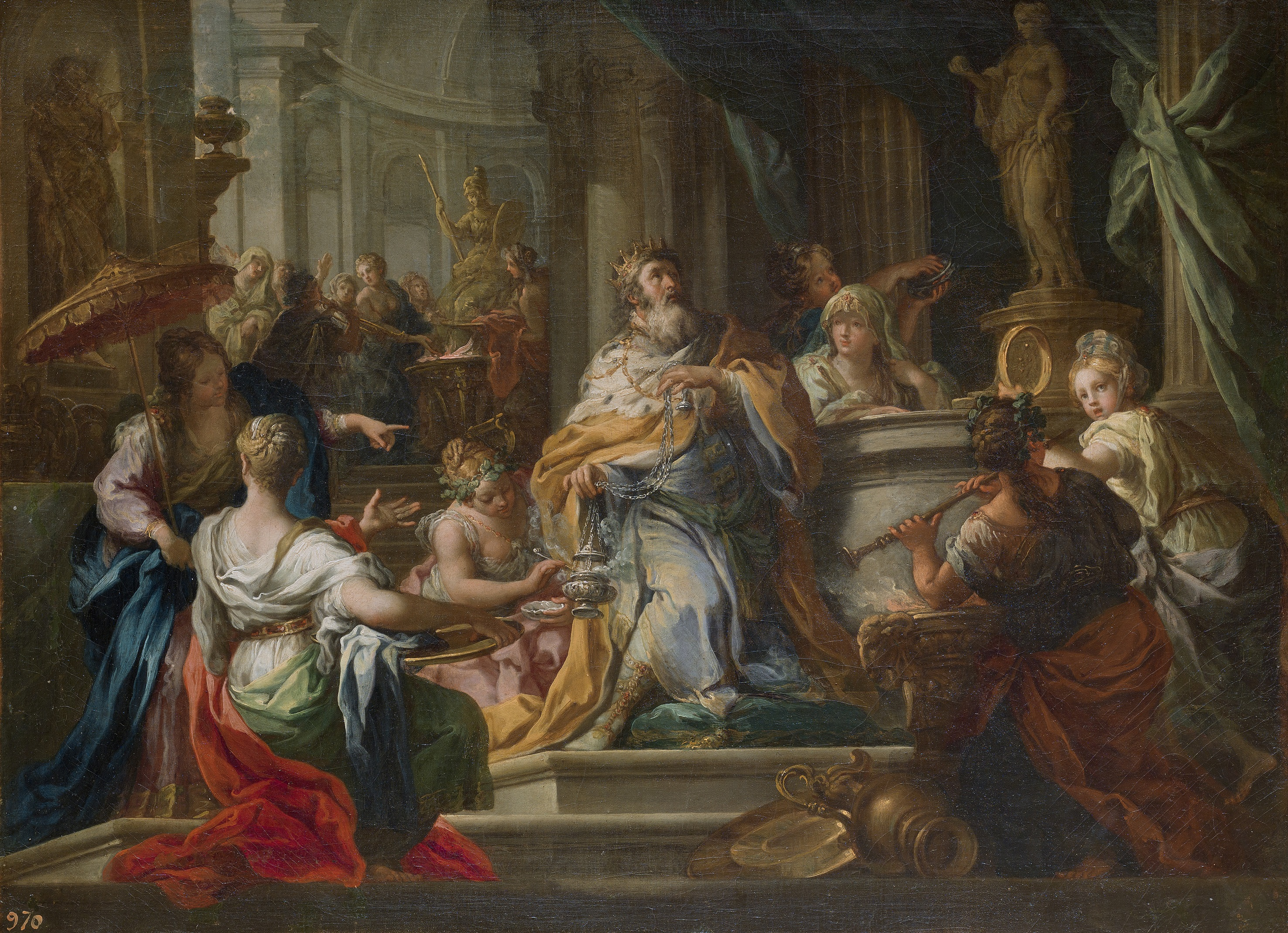
Idolatry of Salomon, c. 1750, oil on canvas, 54 x 71 cm, Museo del Prado, Madrid

The Martyrdom of Saint Matthew, 77 x 142 cm, prov. col.

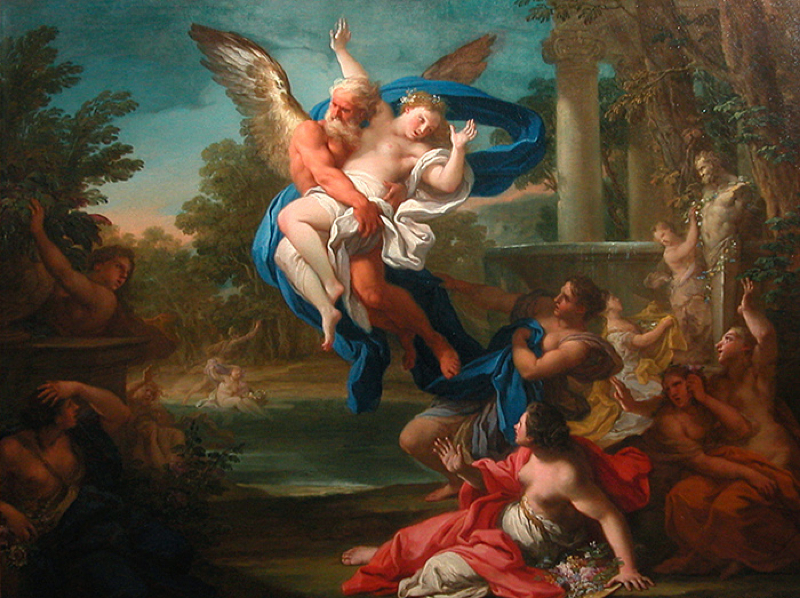
Boreas Abducting Oreithyia, oil on canvas 77.4 x 10.8 cm, Louvre, Paris

== See also ==
- Francesco Solimena
- Pompeo Batoni
- Jacopo Zoboli
- Neri Maria Corsini
