= Juan de Prado =

Spanish missionary

Blessed Juan de Prado OFM
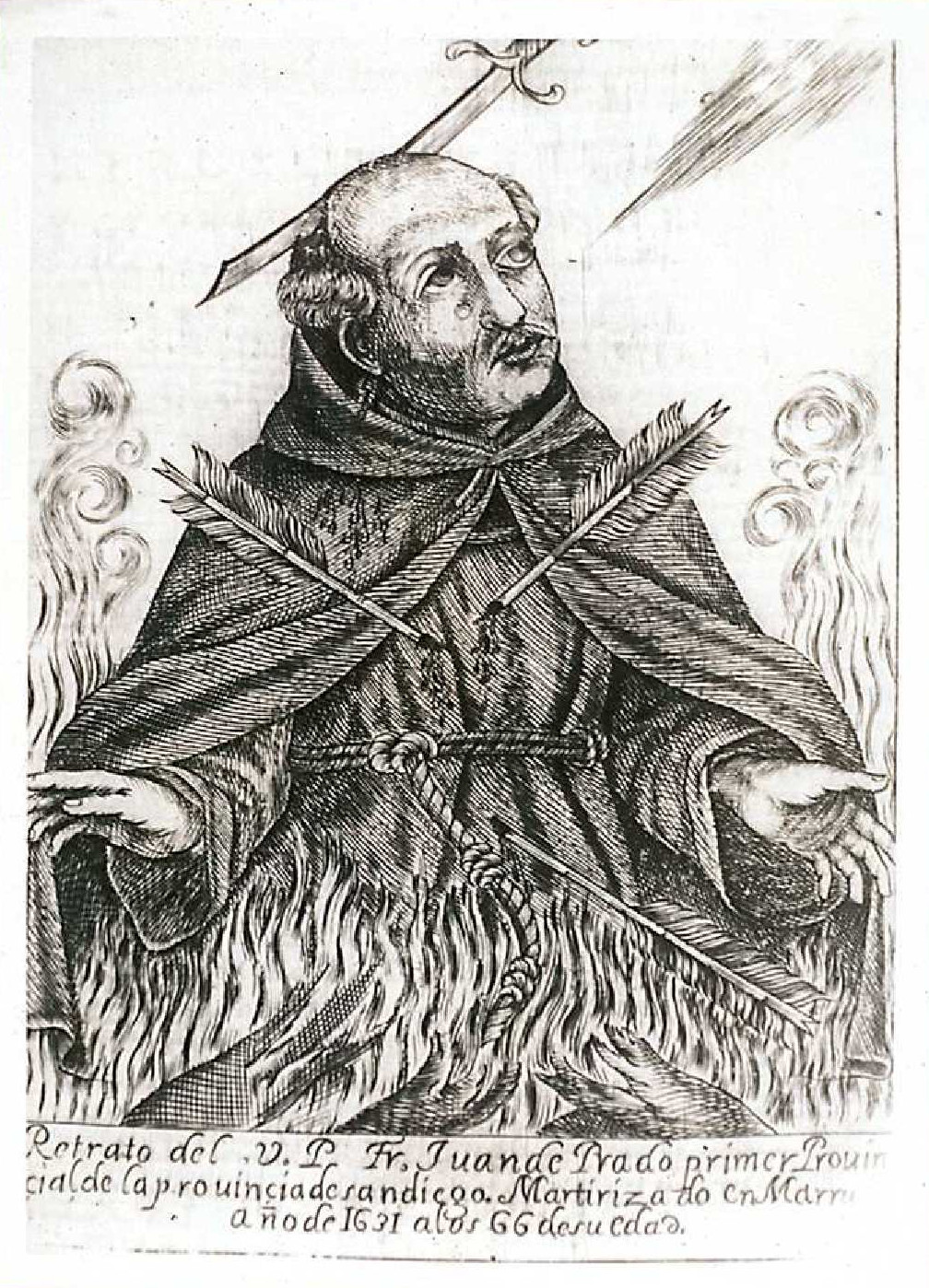
- Beato Juan Portrait

Martyr
- Born: (c. 1563; Morgobresio, León, Habsburg Spain
- Died: 24 May 1631; Marrakesh, Morocco
- Venerated in: Roman Catholic Church
- Beatified: 24 May 1728, Saint Peter's Basilica by Pope Benedict XIII
- Feast: 24 May

Juan de Prado, OFM (c. 1563 – 24 May 1631) was a Spanish Roman Catholic priest and a professed member from the Order of Friars Minor. He served as part of the missions in Muslim Morocco at the request of Pope Urban VIII and brought much solace to the small Christian population there before the ruler had him murdered.

Pope Benedict XIII confirmed his beatification in mid-1728 after confirming that the priest had been murdered in hatred of his Christian faith.

== Life ==
Juan de Prado was born in León circa 1563 to a noble family and was orphaned sometime prior to 1568. He undertook theological studies at the college at Salamanca, and entered the Order of Friars Minor in 1584. He was subsequently ordained and began his ministry as a preacher. He served in various Franciscan houses as novice master and later as guardian.

In 1610 he was elected provincial minister of the Franciscan Province of San Diego. In 1613 an outbreak of plague in Morocco killed all the Franciscans engaged there in the difficult mission. De Prado was appointed by Pope Urban VIII as an apostolic missionary to work among the small Christian population.

He and two companions departed on 27 November from Cádiz and arrived for the mission in Marrakesh, where he evangelized and provided comfort to the faithful there while also administering the sacraments to them. They also dedicated themselves to work among the Christian slaves. The local authorities ordered them to leave the country, but the three Franciscans did not and continued their activity.

Sultan Al Walid ben Zidan had them arrested and imprisoned. They were sentenced to hard labor in the crushing of saltpeter, a mineral for the manufacture of gunpowder. Questioned by the sultan, they did not hesitate to profess their Christian faith and were therefore scourged. At a subsequent public interrogation, de Prado ignored the presence of Sultan and directed his attention and statements to some apostates present. Al Walid struck him, knocking him to the ground. De Prado was then wounded by two arrows.

The Sultan ordered that de Prado be burnt to death, but as he continued to exhort the executioners to follow Christ, one of them became impatient and smashed his head with a stone.

=== Beatification ===
On 24 May 1728 Pope Benedict XIII confirmed that de Prado had been killed in odium fidei ("in hatred of the faith"), thus permitting his beatification.
