= Catacomb of Santi Marco e Marcelliano =

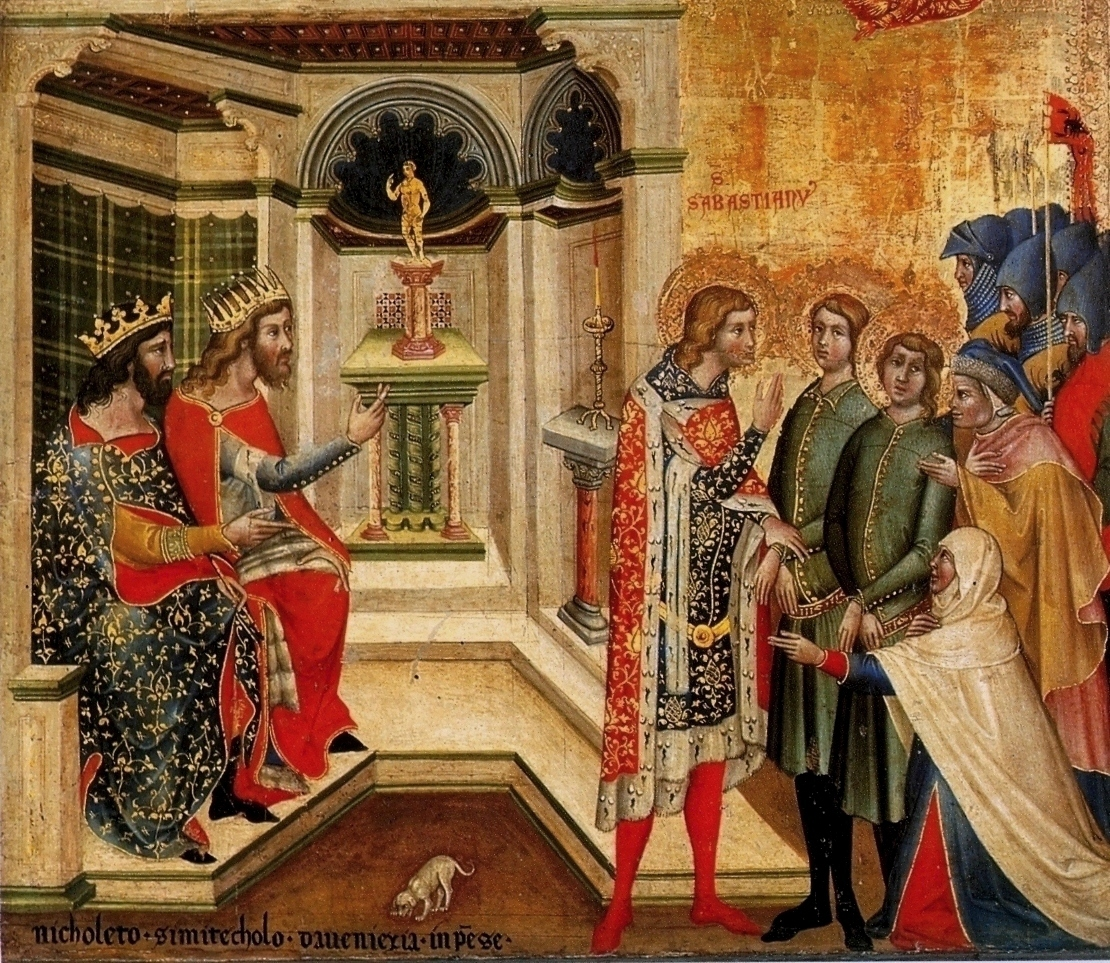
Nicolò Semitecolo, Saints Marcus, Marcellianus and Sebastian) before the Judges.

The Catacomb of Santi Marco e Marcelliano is a catacomb between the ancient via Appia antica and via Ardeatina in what is now the Ardeatino district of Rome. With the catacomb of Callixtus and the Catacomb of Balbina, it is one of three catacombs in the Callixtian Complex between the via Appia antica, via Ardeatina and vicolo delle Sette Chiese.

== Name ==
In ancient sources it is known as "of Basileus at Saint Marcus and Marcellianus". Basileus was the owner of the land in which it was excavated. After the Edict of Milan in 313 the catacomb was named after the two best-known martyrs buried in it, Mark and Marcellian - several ancient documents use the double name

It is also often known as dei Santi Marco e Marcelliano e di papa Damaso (of Saints Mark and Marcellian and of Pope Damasus). Pope Caius (296) was buried alongside Marcus and Marcellianus in an underground basilica, with the site also having a second semi-underground basilica with the tomb Damasus had chosen for himself, his mother Laurentia and his sister Irene. Only traces remain of these above-ground structures. The ancient sources do not mention other martyrs buried there and the catacomb does not include a place of worship.

== Bibliography ==
- (in Italian) Antonio Bosio, Roma Sotterranea, Roma, 1632, pp. 179–186.
- (in Italian) Giovanni Battista de Rossi, Escavazioni nel cimitero di S. Callisto, in Bullettino di Archeologia Cristiana, 6 (1868), pp. 6–15.
- (in Italian) Leonella De Santis, Giuseppe Biamonte (1997). Le catacombe di Roma. Roma: Newton & Compton. pp. 42–44.
- (in Italian) Philippe Pergola, Le catacombe romane. Storia e topografia, Roma, 2000, pp. 204–206.
- (in French) Patrick Saint-Roch (1981). "La région centrale du cimetière connu sous le nom de "Cimetière des Saints Marc et Marcellien et Damase". Rivista di Archeologia Cristiana 57. pp. 209–251.
- (in French) Patrick Saint-Roch, Le cimetière de Basileus ou Coemeterium sanctorum Marci et Marcelliani, Damasique, 1999.
- (in Italian) Joseph Wilpert, La scoperta delle basiliche cimiteriali dei Santi Marco e Marcelliano e Damaso, in Nuovo Bullettino di Archeologia Cristiana, 9 (1903), pp. 43–58.
- (in Italian) Joseph Wilpert, Scavi nel cimitero dei Santi Marco, Marcelliano e Damaso, in Nuovo Bullettino di Archeologia Cristiana, 9 (1903), pp. 315–319.
- (in German) Joseph Wilpert (1930). "Ein wichtiger Fund von der Crypta der heiligen Marcus und Marcellianus". Römische Quartalschrift. pp. 1–5.
