= Catacomb of Balbina =

The Catacomb of Balbina or Catacomb of Mark is a catacomb between the ancient via Appia antica and via Ardeatina in the Ardeatino district of Rome.

It is one of the funerary areas in the Callixtian complex, which is sited between the via Appia antica, via Ardeatina and the vicolo delle Sette Chiese. The complex also includes the catacombs of Callixtus (with all its diverse burial areas) and Santi Marco e Marcelliano.

The Catacomb of Balbina is mentioned in the Depositio episcoporum (which records Pope Mark being buried "in Balbinae" in January-October 336), the Index coemeteriorum vetus (which mentions a cymiterium Balbinae ad sanctum Marcum or 'cemetery of Balbina at St Mark') and two inscriptions (including one relating to a Sabinus who prepared his own tomb in cymiteriu Balbinae in cripta noba or 'in a new gallery of Balbina's cemetery'). The usual name for it thus relates to the owner of the land in which it was dug (Balbina of Rome), whilst the other refers to the main saint buried in it (Pope Mark), to whom the related circular above-ground basilica is also dedicated. Despite these sources, the catacomb's identification is still uncertain.

On 3 September 1991, it was accidentally discovered in a field used for growing medical herbs, the Salesian Tarcisio Gazzola identified traces of the plan of the Constantanian-style basilica, 66 metres long and 27 metres wide, soon identified as the basilica dedicated to Pope Mark mentioned in the literary sources.
