= San Giovanni Addolorata Hospital =

Hospital in Rome, Italy

Azienda Ospedaliera San Giovanni Addolorata
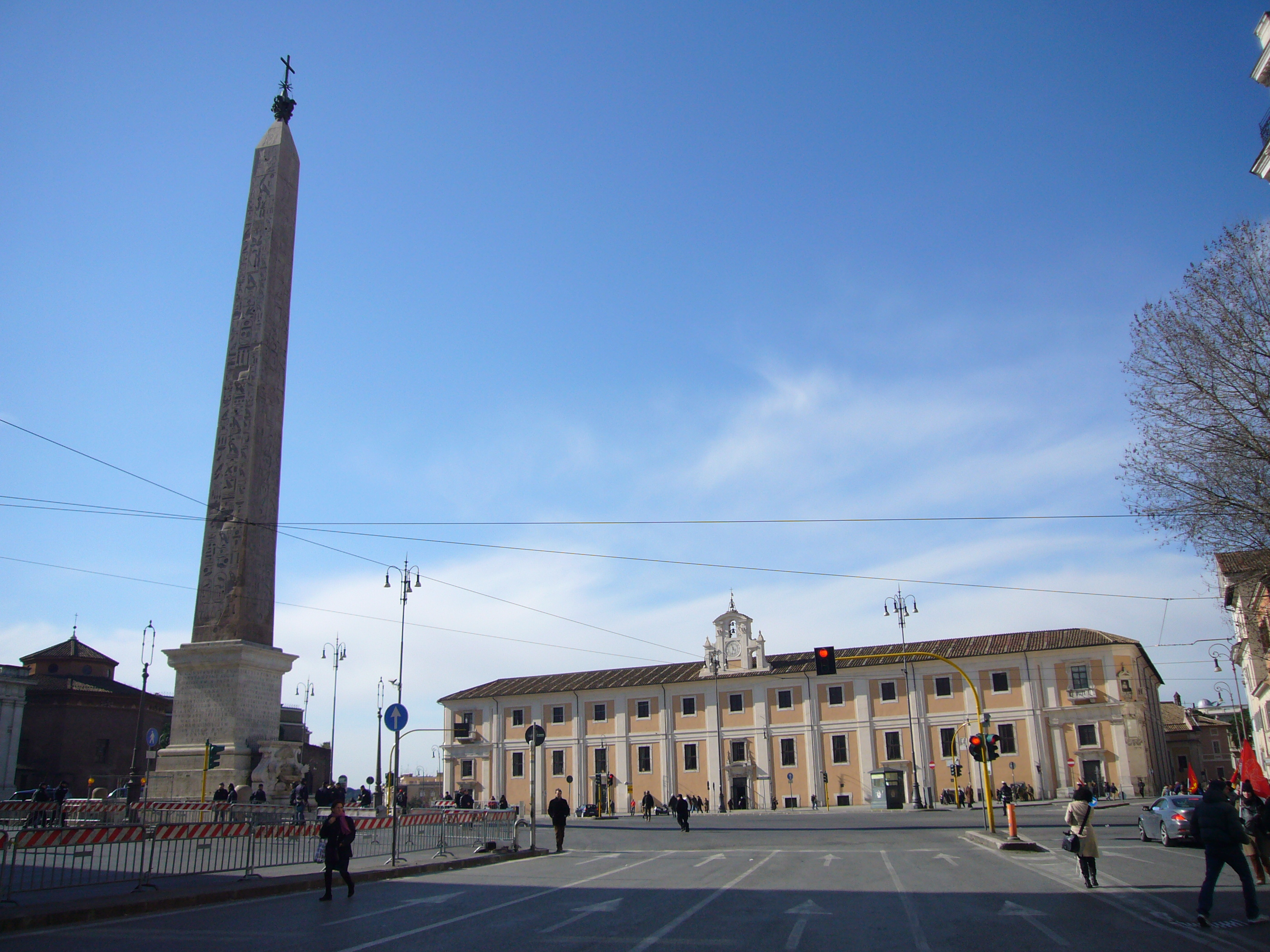
- Ospedale del Salvatore complex on Piazza San Giovanni in Laterano and the Lateran Obelisk.

Geography
- Location: Rome, Via dell'Amba Aradam 9, Lazio, Italy
- Coordinates: 41°53′08.1″N 12°30′09.0″E

Organisation
- Patron: St. John the Baptist

History
- Opened: 1332

Links
- Website: www.hsangiovanni.roma.it

The Azienda Ospedaliera San Giovanni Addolorata in Rome (Italy) is one of the largest hospitals in central Italy; the current administrative designation refers to one of the largest and oldest hospitals in the city, commonly designated as San Giovanni hospital.

== History ==
=== The Confraternita del SS. Salvatore ===
The hospital of San Giovanni originates from the "Archconfraternity of the Holy Savior" (Arciconfraternita del Santissimo Salvatore), established to ensure protection and homage to the acheropoieton of the Saviour kept in the Sancta Sanctorum.
Even before the 13th century "twelve optimate and principal gentlemen of Rome, called Ostiarii, Porters or Recommended by the Holy Savior were established to guard it perpetually". The membership in the congregation – which also dealt with the administration of the assets, that were given to charity to fund the charitable works on behalf of the holy image – soon became hereditary among the "optimate and principal gentlemen of Rome" and in 1332 the congregation itself was raised to the status of Confraternity by Pope John XXII.

But times were barbarians, the sanctuary suffered thefts and administrative troubles, the senatorial families were dying out, while the institution had acquired a remarkable economic, no less than religious importance, and therefore had to be brought back under the control of the Bishop of Rome. Once the Popes had returned to Rome from Avignon, first Martin V, then Nicholas V and Sixtus IV and finally Alexander VI put in order the management of the congregation and its assets, entrusting it entirely to the Confraternity, which was intimately linked to the Lateran Chapter and had become meanwhile a powerful economic entity.

=== The works of charity ===
The Confraternity – as recalled by Gaetano Moroni – "practiced various works of charity. On the feast of St. John it supplied clothes to twelve poor people and then hosted them for lunch: on Holy Thursday it drew up another table for twelve religious, it gave each of them a pair of shoes, a giulio and a bread; it also provided the dowry to poor maidens; it provided hospitality to poor widows; and finally it took care of the hospital of St. John at Sancta Sanctorum and the colleges Capranica, Nardini, Crivelli and Ghislieri. Such merciful works exhorted the charity of the faithful to nourish them with new subsidies; and in fact, the memory of the generosity of Cardinal Giannantonio Sangiorgi from Piacenza, legate in Rome a latere during the absence of Alexander VI, as well as that of Julius II, who designated the Confraternite as heir of his assets, may be everlasting.".

=== The building stages ===
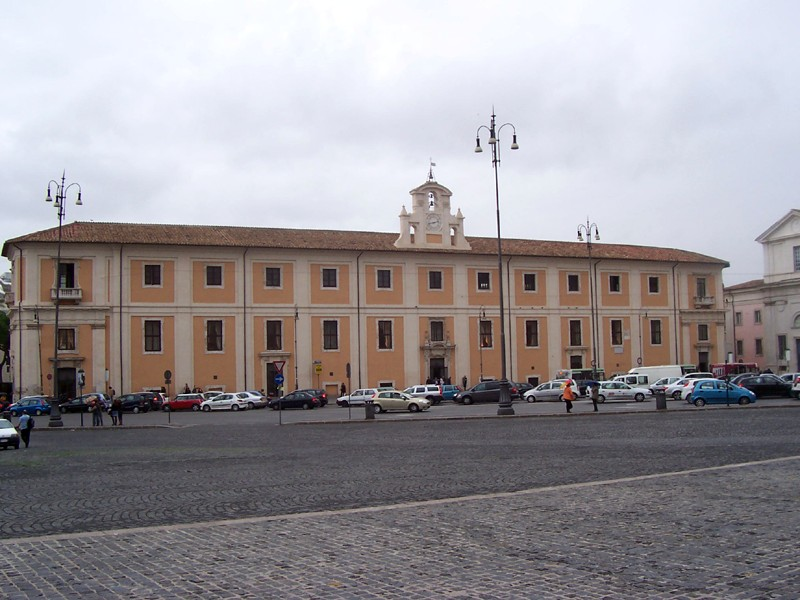
The facade of the hospital by Giacomo Mola overlooking Piazza di San Giovanni in Laterano.

According to tradition, Honorius I in 626 would have transformed his family house into a church dedicated to Saint Andrew, near which, in 1216, Cardinal Giovanni Colonna founded and outfitted a hospice for pilgrims entitled to the same saint.

In 1333 the Confraternity obtained some dilapidated buildings near the church of St. Andrew to found its own hospital; among these, a chapel dedicated to St. Michael the Archangel, that gave the name to the new hospital.
Over time, the hospital was repeatedly expanded thanks to the bequests of benefactors who thus thought of earning the salvation of their souls.

In 1580, Pope Gregory XIII Boncompagni started the construction of the new wing, which still today overlooks the Lateran square towards the west. The long building work of the hospital continued under various popes (Sixtus V, Clement VIII and Urban VIII) until 1639, and were directed by Giacomo Mola from Lugano, who arrived in Rome as the nephew of a bricklayer member of the Confraternite and who in turn joined it in 1606.

At the beginning of the 18th century, the hospital, open to "all patients of any nation, sex, and age", had 120 beds for men ("which are doubled according to the needs and mainly in summer"), while "the women's one, on the other side of the public street, and enlarged by Pope Alexander VII, contains 60 beds.".

At the beginning of the 19th century (the exact period is not clear, perhaps during the French administration), the hospital was completely intended for women and, according to Morichini, could accommodate over 500 women, although normally the patients did not exceed 200. The "Statistics of the Commission for the hospitals in Rome for the year 1863" reports 215 patients at 31 December and 2,563 admitted during the year (446 of them died, the other ones "healed or improved'"). In 1892 the Hospital of San Rocco at the Port of Ripetta, intended for travailing women, was suppressed and all patients were transferred to San Giovanni Hospital.

=== The land ownership ===
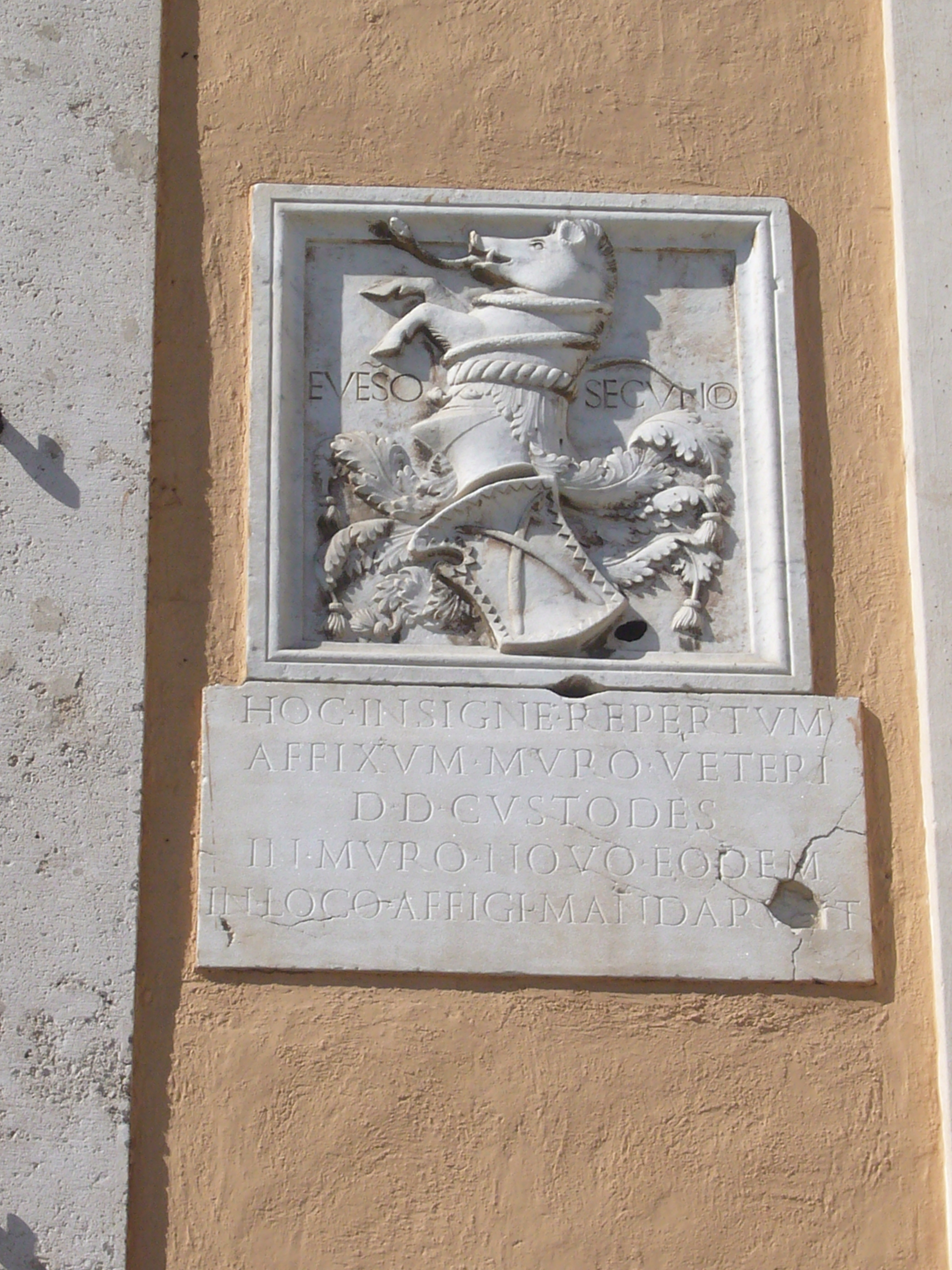
The coat of arms of Everso II degli Anguillara, a great benefactor of the hospital together with his sons in the 15th century.

The highly detailed Catasto annonario by Nicola Maria Nicolai (1756–1833) gives an overall picture of the agricultural properties belonging to the "Venerable hospital of the Holy Savior "ad Sancta Sanctorum" at the beginning of the 19th century. The following estates are mentioned:

- between Via Tiburtina and Via Nomentana, the complex of the Aguzzano estates (today a regional park and a densely urbanized area, at that time composed of the estates of Casaletto di Aguzzano, Pedica, Aguzzanello, Scorticabove and Aguzzano as such), with an extension of over 212 hectares (0.82 sq mi) between the Aniene, Casal de' Pazzi, Rebibbia and San Basilio;
- between Via Appia Antica and Via Tuscolana, the vast complex of estates including Arco di Travertino, Statuario, Capo di Bove, Torre Spaccata and Sette Bassi: over 1,068 hectares (4.12 sq mi) in total;
- in the area of Cecchignola, the Tor Pagnotta estate, an ancient property of the Knights Templar (321 hectares (1.24 sq mi));
- on Via Ardeatina, the Tor Marancia estate (253 hectares (0.98 sq mi));
- on Via Ostiense, the Selcia estate, on the border with Vallerano (266 hectares (1.03 sq mi));
- towards Casalotti, the estate of Santa Rufina (140 hectares (0.54 sq mi));
- finally, on the border with Mentana, the Capitignano estate, now part of the Marcigliana nature reserve (528 hectares (2.04 sq mi)).

The hospital therefore owned a very large agricultural land patrimony – even considering just what lay within the borders of Rome – extending for almost 2,800 hectares (11 sq mi): it was also increased by numerous estates of various kinds and sizes coming from testamentary bequests, which produced incomes, in addition to those properly intended for hospital services.

=== After the Italian unification ===
What remained of the land inheritance of the hospital after the unification of Italy, the alienations and the clearance of the ecclesiastical patrimony was merged in 1896, together with the assets of the other hospitals of Rome, in the institution called Pio Istituto di Santo Spirito e Ospedali Riuniti.

The connection between the hospital and the Holy See continued at least until the full implementation of the Italian National Health Service (the hospitals, which were the heirs of the Catholic charities also from an economic point of view, were dissolved only in 1978 with the Law nr. 833).
After the war it was greatly expanded at public expense, through the construction of new wings inaugurated in September 1958 by the Christian Democrat Mayor of Rome Urbano Cioccetti – one of the main protagonists of the post-war urban planning of the capital – in the presence of the Ministers Fernando Tambroni and Giulio Andreotti.

== The present hospital district ==
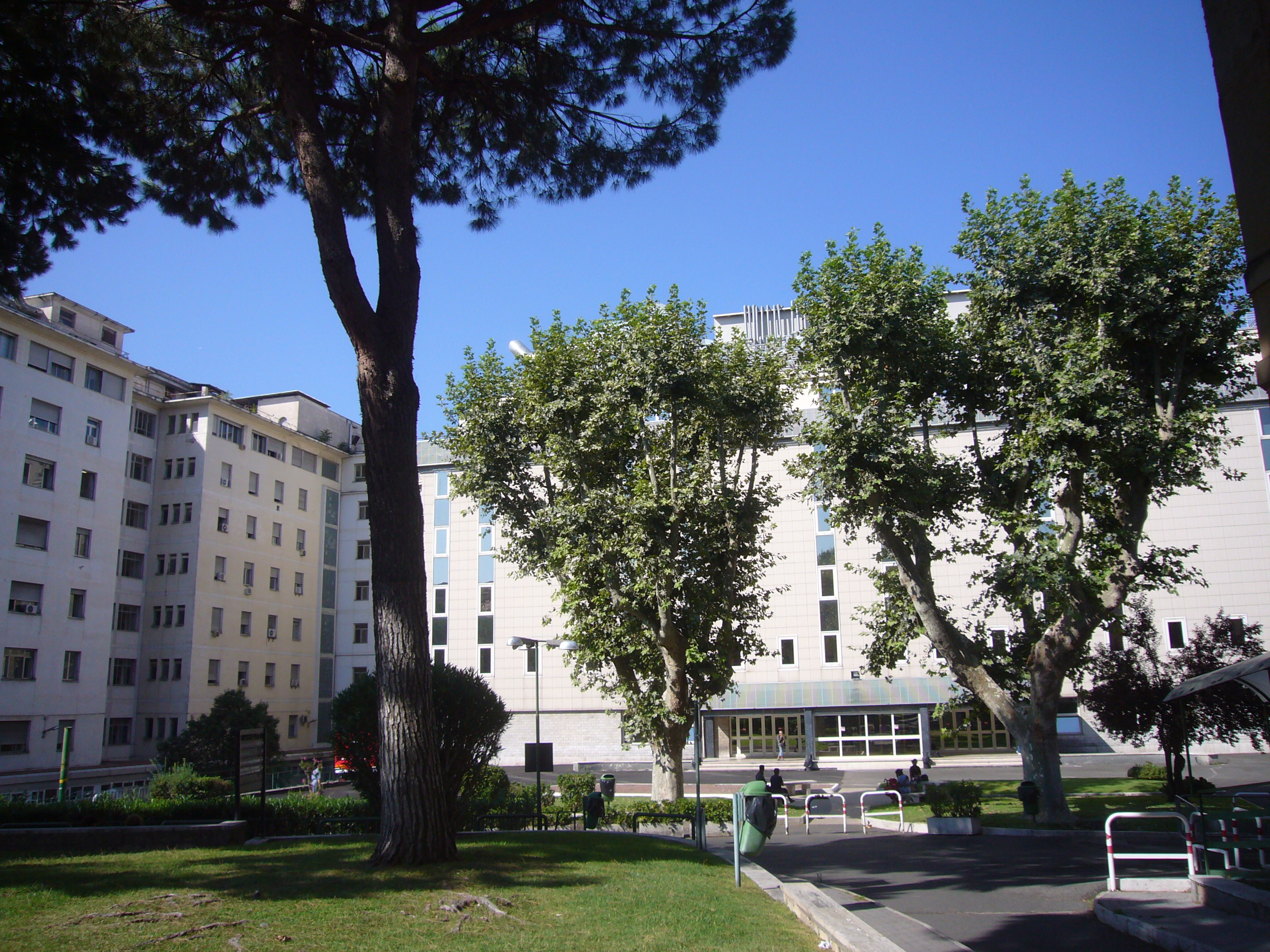
San Giovanni Hospital: modern wings.

The hospital currently consists of a huge block of hospital services that extends between Piazza di San Giovanni in Laterano and Via di Santo Stefano Rotondo up to the eponymous basilica on one side, and along Via dell'Amba Aradam up to Via di Villa Fonseca on the other. Coming from the square, the district includes the hospital of San Giovanni, the hospital of the Addolorata (where a new morgue with non-denominational and inter-denominational services was opened in 2009) and the "British hospital". The "Women's Hospital" rises on the other side of Via di san Giovanni in Laterano, overlooking the square.

On the opposite side of Via di Santo Stefano Rotondo there is the Celio military polyclinic, which further expands the sanitary district, although it is not part of the complex of San Giovanni.

== See also ==
- Santi Andrea e Bartolomeo
- San Lorenzo in Palatio ad Sancta Sanctorum

== Bibliography ==
- About the Confraternita del SS. Salvatore see Giovanni Marangoni, Istoria dell'antichissimo oratorio o capella di San Lorenzo nel patriarchio Lateranense comunemente appellato Sancta Sanctorum, Rome 1747.
- About the farming estates belonging to the Venerable Hospital ad Sancta Sanctorum see Nicola Maria Nicolai, Memorie, leggi e osservazioni sulle campagne e sull'annona di Roma, Rome 1803, passim.
- Antonio Nibby, Roma nell'anno 1838, Rome 1841. About the Archispedale del SS. Salvatore see pp. 137–141.
- Carlo Luigi Morichini, Degl'Istituti di pubblica carità ed istruzione primaria e delle prigioni in Roma. Libri tre, Rome 1842, chapter III: Archiospedale del Santissimo Salvatore ad Sancta Sanctorum, pp. 60–74.
- Cinzia Martini,, 2009–2013
