= Rivella (surname) =

Rivella is an Italian surname. Notable people with the surname include:

- Francesco Rivella (1927–2025), Italian chemist and businessman
- Giuseppe Rivella (1901–1963), Italian racing cyclist
- Mauro Rivella (born 1963), Italian Catholic priest

== See also ==
- Rivelli, surname
