= Suburbs of Rome =

Map of the subdivisions of Rome: rioni (districts) quartieri (neighborhoods) suburbi (suburbs) zone dell'Agro romano (areas of Agro romano)

The Suburbi di Roma (Italian for "Suburbs of Rome") are the third level of toponomastic subdivision of the Municipality of Rome (Italy).

The total resident population is 177,847 inhabitants.

== History ==
The first 11 Suburbs were drawn in 1911: they were coded with the letter S and a one-letter or two-letters alphabetic code.

- S. P Parioli
- S. TI Tiburtino
- S. PL Prenestino-Labicano
- S. TU Tuscolano
- S. AL Appio-Latino
- S. O Ostiense
- S. PO Portuense
- S. G Gianicolense
- S. A Aurelio
- S. T Trionfale
- S. M Milvio

Aristofane zone Kant zone Plinio Zone CN12

With Council Resolution nr. 20 of August 20, 1921 the Suburbs were remapped and identified by Roman numerals:

- S. I Parioli
- S. II Nomentano
- S. III Tiburtino
- S. IV Prenestino-Labicano
- S. V Tuscolano
- S. VI Appio-Latino
- S. VII Ostiense
- S. VIII Portuense
- S. IX Gianicolense
- S. X Aurelio
- S. XI Trionfale
- S. XII Milvio

On May 23, 1935, the Milvio Suburb, together with the homonymous Quartiere, was renamed Della Vittoria with Resolution nr. 3944 of the Governor of Rome Giuseppe Bottai, «since most of the roads in that area are named after the infantrymen and heroes of the last great war.».

Following a variation of the toponymy dictionary on March 1, 1954, the Parioli and Ostiense Suburbs were suppressed and their territories assigned, respectively, to the Tor di Quinto Suburb and to the newly created Ardeatino and Giuliano-Dalmata Quarters. The numbering of the following Suburbs, from the eighth to the twelfth, was decreased by one. The number of Suburbs then went from 12 to 11.

- S. I Tor di Quinto
- S. II Nomentano
- S. III Tiburtino
- S. IV Prenestino-Labicano
- S. V Tuscolano
- S. VI Appio-Latino
- S. VII Portuense
- S. VIII Gianicolense
- S. IX Aurelio
- S. X Trionfale
- S. XI Della Vittoria

With resolution of the Special Commissioner nr. 2453 of September 13, 1961, as a consequence of the high rate of urbanization, the five suburbs of the eastern area, from II to VI, were officially suppressed and replaced with new Quartieri, while the Tor di Quinto Suburb was reduced in extension by transferring the southern section to the new Quartiere with the same name; similarly, the Trionfale Suburb left its east section to the new Quartiere Primavalle. The new situation is summarized in the following table:

S. I – Tor di Quinto	S. I – Tor di Quinto; Q. XVIII – Tor di Quinto
S. II – Nomentano	Q. XXI – Pietralata
S. III – Tiburtino	Q. XXII – Collatino
S. IV – Prenestino-Labicano	Q. XXIII – Alessandrino
S. V – Tuscolano	Q. XXIV – Don Bosco; Q. XXV – Appio Claudio
S. VI – Appio-Latino	Q. XXVI – Appio-Pignatelli
S. X – Trionfale	S. X – Trionfale; Q. XXVII – Primavalle

Therefore, only six Suburbs remained, all in the western area of the Municipality of Rome: they were not renumbered, in forecast of their future suppression which nonetheless has not yet taken place. Their total area is 53.71 km².

- S. I Tor di Quinto
- S. VII Portuense
- S. VIII Gianicolense
- S. IX Aurelio
- S. X Trionfale
- S. XI Della Vittoria

== See also ==
- Ager Romanus
- Quarters of Rome
- Administrative subdivision of Rome
- Zones of Rome

== Bibliography ==
- Antonietta Brancati (1990). "La Cartografia dell'Agro Romano". Centro di Coordinamento Didattico, Assessorato Alla Cultura, Comune di Roma. Rome: Palombi & Partner. ISSN 0394-9753.
- Comune di Roma, Ripartizione Antichità e Belle arti (1982–1988). Carta storica archeologica monumentale e paesistica del suburbio e dell'agro romano. Rome: Comune di Roma.
- S. Mezzapesa (1962). Planimetria di Roma. Suburbio. Agro Romano. Rome: Istituto Cartografico Italiano. OCLC 636568726.
- Maria Luisa Marchi; Fiorenzo Catalli (2008). Suburbio di Roma. Una residenza produttiva lungo la via Cornelia. Bari: Edipuglia. ISBN 978-88-7228-494-0.
- Paolo Montanari (2009). Sepolcri circolari di Roma e suburbio. Elementi architettonici dell'elevato. Rome: Fabrizio Serra Editore. ISBN 978-88-6227-198-1.
- Gabriella Restaino (2012). Il Suburbio di Roma. Una storia cartografica. Rome: Gangemi Editore. ISBN 978-88-492-2412-2.
