= Giuliano-Dalmata =

Coordinates: 41.8163°N 12.4999°E

- Quartiere of Rome
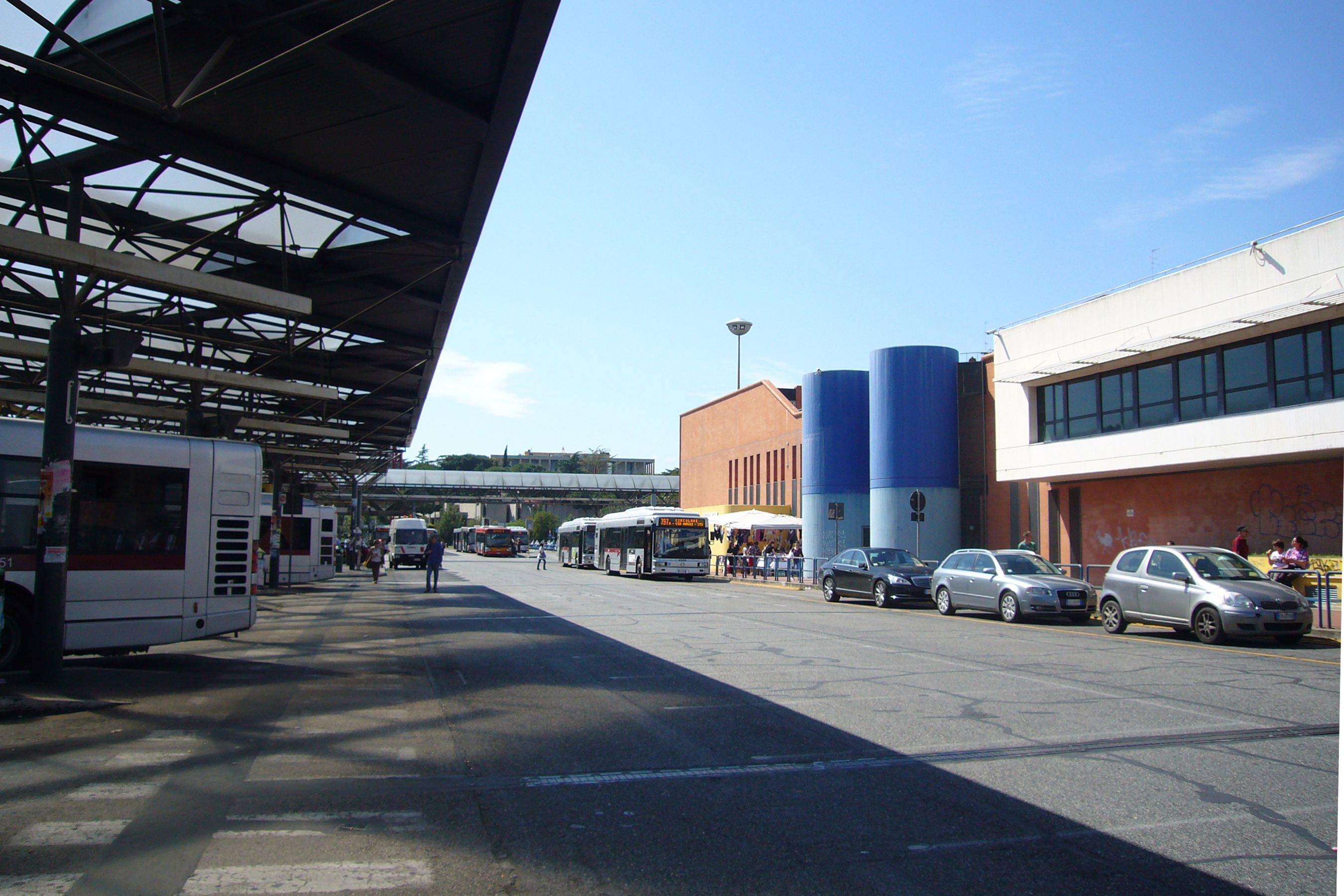
- Laurentina, the terminus of Line B, and the suburban bus station

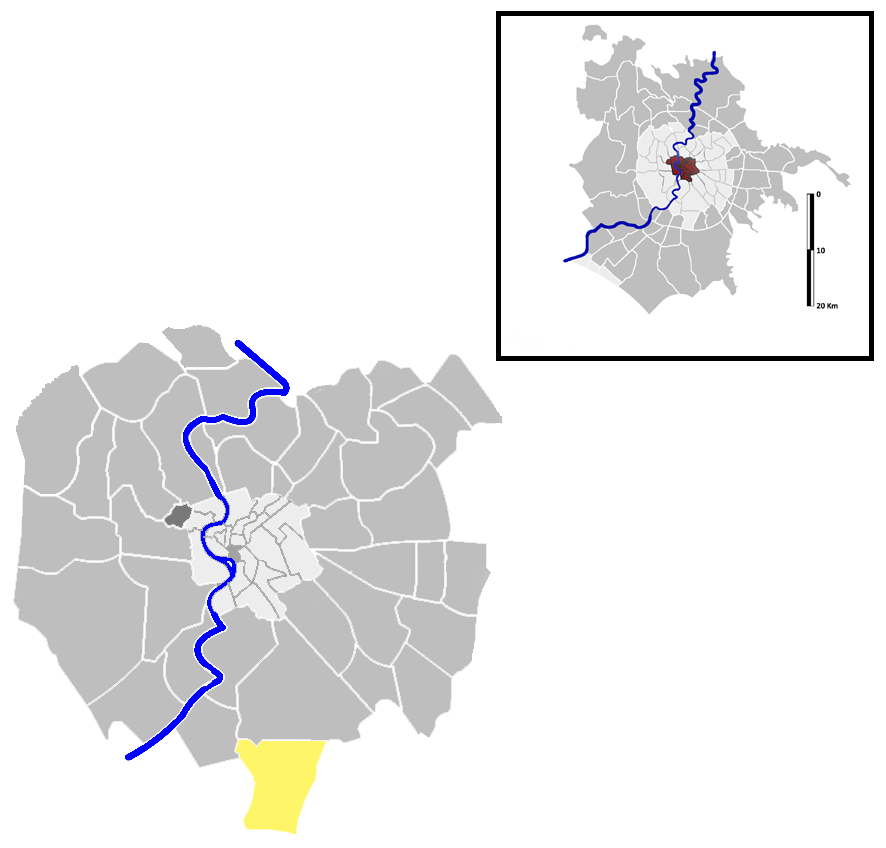
- Position of the quartiere within the city
- Country: Italy
- Region: Lazio
- Province: Rome
- Comune: Rome

Area
  - Total: 3.0845 sq mi (7.9889 km^{2})

Population (2016)
  - Total: 21,350
  - Density: 6,921.6/sq mi (2,672.46/km^{2})
- Time zone: UTC+1 (CET)
  - Summer (DST): UTC+2 (CEST)

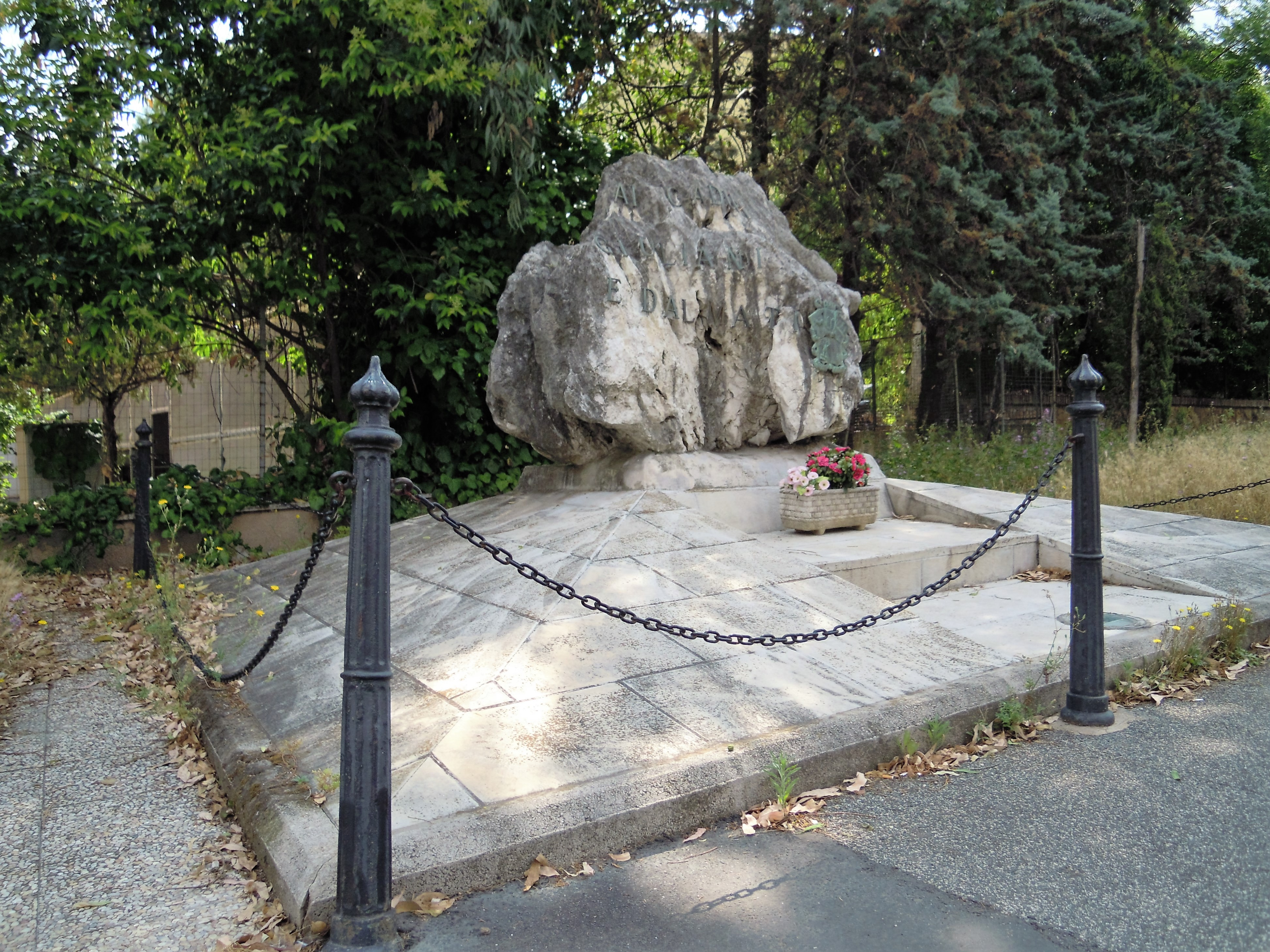
Monument to the julian and dalmatian fallen (1961), built along the Via Laurentina

Giuliano-Dalmata is the 31st quartiere of Rome, identified by the initials Q. XXXI. Its name refers to the Julian, Istrian and Dalmatian refugees that settled there in the postwar period.

== History ==
Born in the 1930s as Villaggio Operaio E42, to house the workers employed in the construction of the World Expo 42, and abandoned during the Second World War, in the postwar period the borough remained uninhabited, until in 1947 twelve families of julian refugees settled in the area around the current Piazza Giuliani e Dalmati and renamed the settlement Villaggio Giuliano.

The official inauguration of the new district took place on 7 November 1948, when the old workers dormitories were restored and readjusted for residential use, and consigned to the refugees, in the presence of the then Secretary of the Council of Ministers Giulio Andreotti and of Mrs. De Gasperi, the wife of the then Prime Minister Alcide De Gasperi. During the ceremony, in the little chapel of the neighborhood it was celebrated the first wedding of the community, between Armando Chioggia, native of Fiume, and the Roman girl Fernanda Tombesi, symbolizing the union of the refugees with the local citizens.

In 1955, following to the coming of almost 2.000 refugees from Istria and Dalmatia, the quartiere took its current name.

== Geography ==
The territory of the quarter includes the urban zone 12B Villaggio Giuliano and a great part of the urban zone 12E Cecchignola. In the district is also located a frazione of Rome, the only one that is not included in the Agro Romano, namely Castello della Cecchignola.

=== Boundaries ===
To the north, Giuliano-Dalmata borders with Quartiere Ardeatino (Q. XX), from which is separated by Via di Vigna Murata.

Eastward, the quartiere borders with Zona Cecchignola (Z. XXII), from which is separated by the stretch of Via Ardeatina between Via di Vigna Murata and Via della Cecchignola and by Via della Cecchignola itself.

To the south, it borders with Zona Castel di Leva (Z. XXIII), whose boundary is marked by a portion of the Grande Raccordo Anulare.

Westward, Giuliano-Dalmata borders with Zona Fonte Ostiense (Z. XXIV) and with Quartiere Europa (Q. XXII), the border being outlined by Via Laurentina.

=== Odonymy ===
The majority of the streets and squares are dedicated to prominent Julian, Istrian and Dalmatian personalities and to historical events that occurred to that geographical area, e.g. Largo Vittime delle Foibe Istriane, Largo Eccidio di Malga Bala (commemorating twelve policemen of the GNR killed in 1944 by slovene partisans on the Malga Bala plateau) or Parco Caduti per Trieste (commemorating people killed by the Anglo-American police during an irredentist turmoil on 5 and 6 November 1953).

The toponyms of the quartiere can be categorized as follows:

- Astronomers, e.g. Via Andrea Argoli, Via Vincenzo Cerulli, Via Annibale De Gasparis, Via Luca Gaurico, Via Mentore Maggini, Via Giuseppe Piazzi, Via Annibale Riccò;
- Julian, Istrian and Dalmatian personalities, e.g. Via Tommaso Arcidiacono, Via Gian Francesco Biondi, Via Elio Lampridio Cerva, Via Norma Cossetto, Via Giorgio da Sebenico, Via Francesco de Suppé, Via Roberto Ferruzzi, Via Marino Ghetaldi, Via Stefano Gradi, Via Fratelli Laurana (Luciano and Francesco), Via Antonio Maria Lorgna, Via Marco Marulo, Via Andrea Meldola, Via Adolfo Mussafia, Via Pier Alessandro Paravia, Via Domenico Ragnina, Via Federico Seismit-Doda, Via Oscar Sinigaglia, Via Antonio Smareglia, Via Antonio Tacconi, Via Roberto Visiani, Piazza Bernardo Zamagna;
- Local names, e.g. Via del Casale Solaro, Piazza Castello della Cecchignola, Via della Cecchignola, Via della Cecchignoletta, Vicolo Colle della Strega, Via della Fonte Meravigliosa;
- Military-related names near the Cecchignola Military City, e.g. Via degli Arditi, Via del Battaglione San Marco, Via Canzone del Piave, Largo dei Cappellani Militari, Piazza dei Carabinieri, Via dei Corazzieri, Via Divisione Folgore, Via Divisione Torino, Viale dell'Esercito, Via dei Paracadutisti;
- Prominent women in the frazione of Castello della Cecchignola, e.g. Via Emanuela Loi, Via Linda Malnati, Via Margaret Mead, Via Beata Savina Petrilli, Via Vera Vassalle.

== Places of interest ==
=== Churches ===
- San Marco Evangelista in Agro Laurentino
- Sante Perpetua e Felicita
- San Giuseppe da Copertino
- Santa Giovanna Antida Thouret
- Sant'Anselmo alla Cecchignola

=== Museums ===
- Archivio Museo Storico di Fiume
- Museo Storico della Motorizzazione Militare

=== Other ===
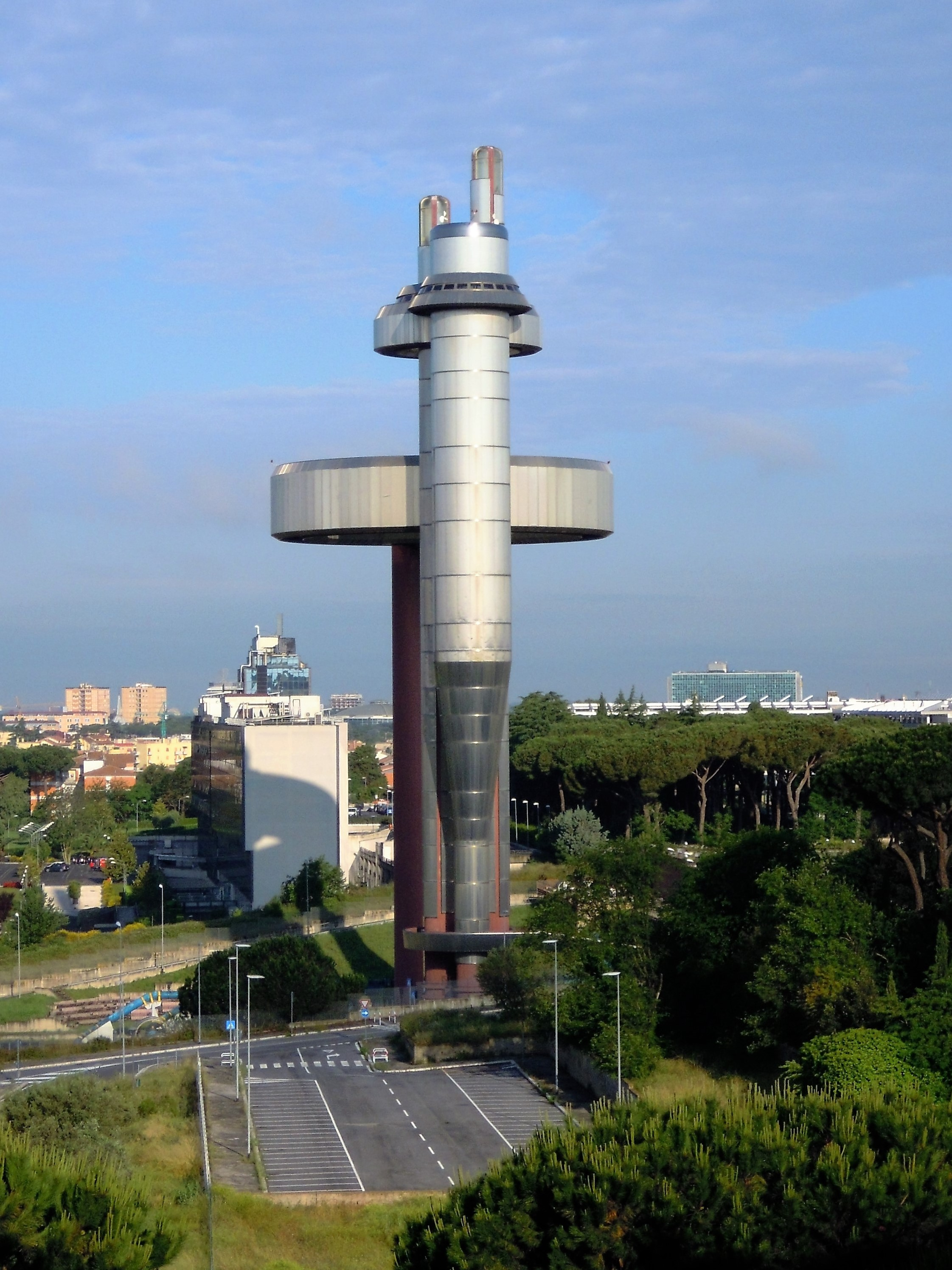
The Vigna Murata surge tank

- Monument to the julian and dalmatian fallen, in Via Laurentina: it is a karstic rock coming from the WWI battlefields, bearing the coats of arms of Istria, Fiume, Trieste, Gorizia and Dalmatia
- Monument to the victims of the Foibe massacres, in Largo Vittime delle Foibe Istriane
- Vigna Murata water tower, in Via del Casale Solaro: it is a 120 meters tall surge tank, designed by Francesco Palpacelli in 1989

== Cinema ==
The 1962 movie The Police Commissioner, by Alberto Sordi, was mainly shot in EUR and in Giuliano-Dalmata.

Part of the film Talcum Powder, by Carlo Verdone, was shot in Giuliano-Dalmata: the modern edifices of Via Elio Lampridio Cerva (Nadia's house), Via Veranzio (Rossella's house) and Piazza Bernardino Zamagna are recognizable. In a famous scene, the protagonist asks his wife where Via Lampridio Cerva is, being surprised by the unusual name.

The quarter has been the set of several other movies, such as 7 chili in 7 giorni, by Luca Verdone, starring Renato Pozzetto and Carlo Verdone, and Da grande, by Franco Amurri and starring Renato Pozzetto.
