= Quarters of Rome =

Quarters of Rome

The Quarters of Rome (Italian: Quartieri di Roma) are the areas in and around the Italian city of Rome which became urbanised after the foundation of the last city-centre rione, Prati.

They form the second level of administrative sub-divisions of Roma Capitale. Together they cover 171.38 km^{2} and hold 1483913 inhabitants.

== History ==
The first 15 quarters were officially founded and numbered in 1926, after first being drafted in 1911.

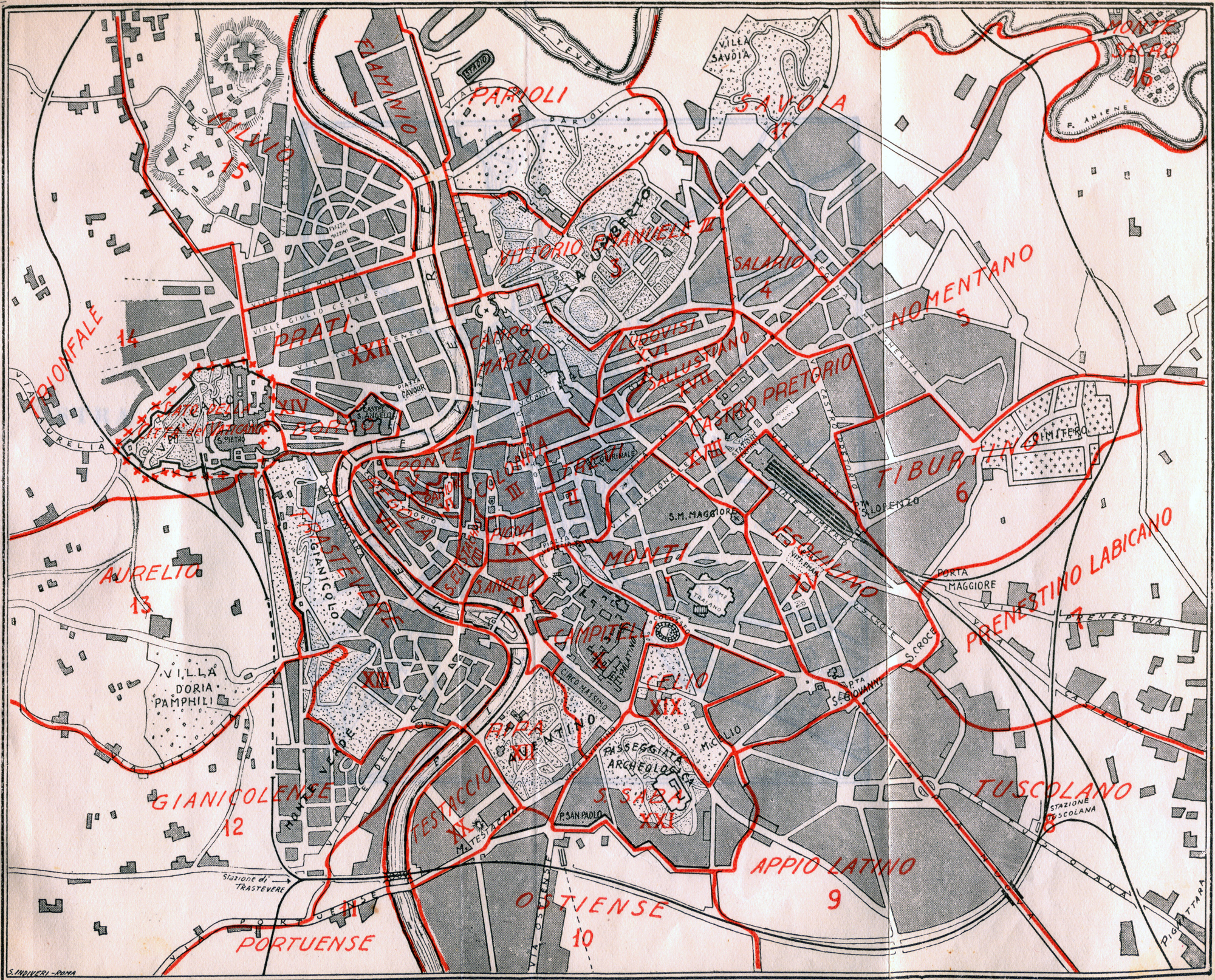
The city-centre quarters in 1930

As of 1930 there were two more unofficial quarters: the quarter XVI, which was called Città Giardino Aniene in 1924; and the quarter XVII, that was named Savoia in 1926. These two were later officially renamed, the XVII becoming Trieste in 1946 and the XVI becoming Monte Sacro in 1951. Other quarters have been renamed: the quarter XV, previously called Milvio, became Della Vittoria in 1935, while the III, once known as Vittorio Emanuele III in honor of the King of Italy, was renamed Pinciano in 1946.

In 1961, 18 more quarters were established and numbered XVIII to XXXV. Some of the new quarters were created dismembering five eastern suburbs of the city, some others were established in the rural area around the city, the so called Agro Romano (the remaining part of the Agro Romano was divided into zones in the same year).

== List ==
- Q. I Flaminio
- Q. II Parioli
- Q. III Pinciano
- Q. IV Salario
- Q. V Nomentano
- Q. VI Tiburtino
- Q. VII Prenestino-Labicano
- Q. VIII Tuscolano
- Q. IX Appio-Latino
- Q. X Ostiense
- Q. XI Portuense
- Q. XII Gianicolense
- Q. XIII Aurelio
- Q. XIV Trionfale
- Q. XV Della Vittoria
- Q. XVI Monte Sacro
- Q. XVII Trieste
- Q. XVIII Tor di Quinto
- Q. XIX Prenestino-Centocelle
- Q. XX Ardeatino
- Q. XXI Pietralata
- Q. XXII Collatino
- Q. XXIII Alessandrino
- Q. XXIV Don Bosco
- Q. XXV Appio Claudio
- Q. XXVI Appio-Pignatelli
- Q. XXVII Primavalle
- Q. XXVIII Monte Sacro Alto
- Q. XXIX Ponte Mammolo
- Q. XXX San Basilio
- Q. XXXI Giuliano-Dalmata
- Q. XXXII EUR
- Q. XXXIII Lido di Ostia Ponente
- Q. XXXIV Lido di Ostia Levante
- Q. XXXV Lido di Castel Fusano

== Bibliography (in Italian) ==
- Giorgio Carpaneto, AA.VV, I quartieri di Roma, Roma, Newton Compton Editori, 1997. ISBN 978-88-8183-639-0.
- Fabrizio Falconi, Misteri e segreti dei rioni e dei quartieri di Roma, Roma, Newton Compton Editori, 2013. ISBN 978-88-541-5766-8.
- Claudio Rendina, I quartieri di Roma, vol. 1, Roma, Newton Compton Editori, 2006. ISBN 978-88-541-0594-2.
- Claudio Rendina, I quartieri di Roma, vol. 2, Roma, Newton Compton Editori, 2006. ISBN 978-88-541-0595-9.
