= Catacomb of the Nunziatella =

Catacomb in Rome, Italy

Coordinates: 41.835801°N 12.511291°E

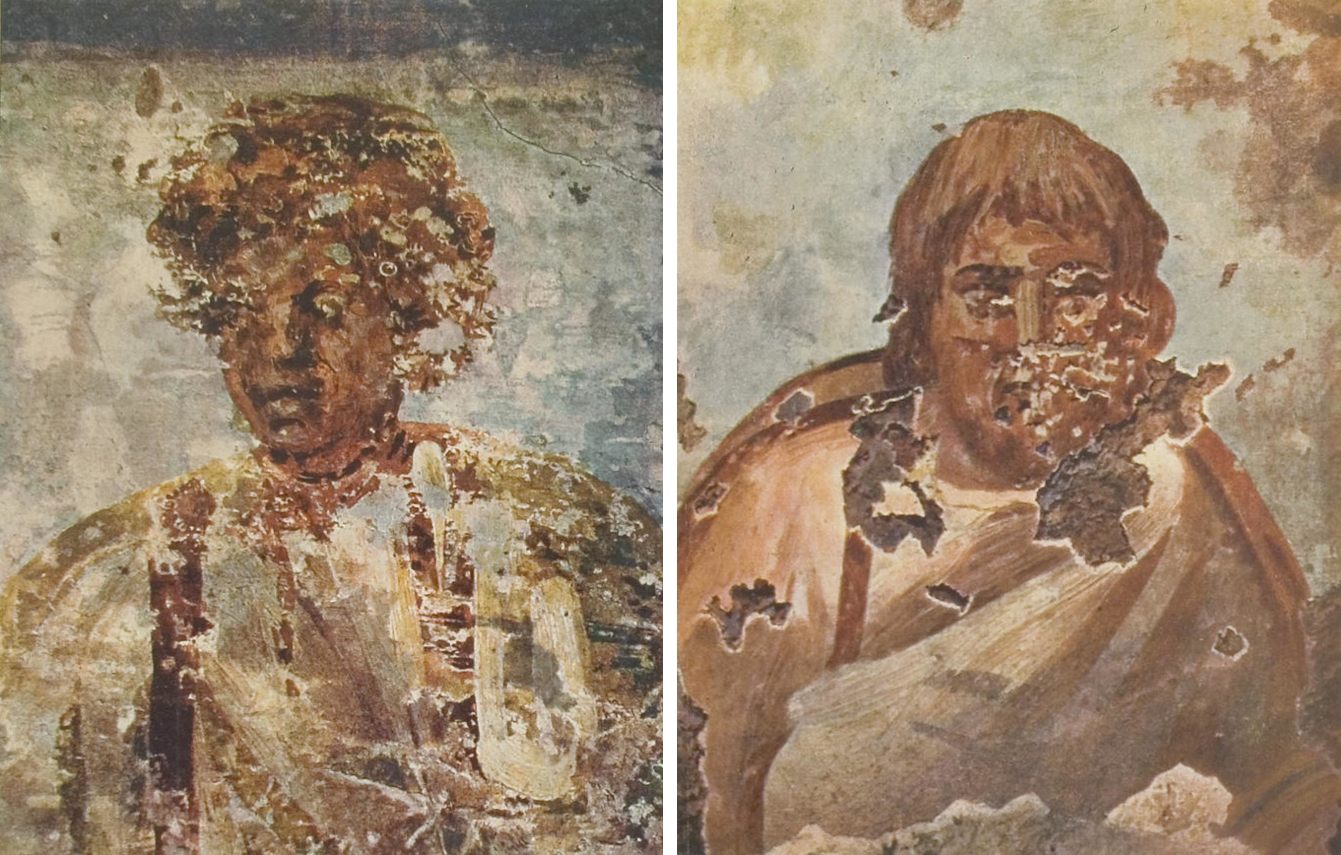
Frescoes from the Roman catacombs. (right): Christ as judge, from the Nunziatella catacomb, 2nd half of 3rd century A.D. (left): image of Christ from the Domitilla catacombs, beginning of 4th century A.D.

The Catacomb of the Nunziatella or the Catacomb of the Annunziatella is a single-level catacomb on via di Grotta Perfetta in the Ardeatino quarter of Rome. It is named after the Annunziatella church above ground on the site.

It is not mentioned in any ancient literary, liturgical or devotional sources and no traces remain of the martyrs' burials. This means it was solely excavated for use by the small rural community in the area. Above ground on the site was a vast necropolis dating back to the Roman Republic, by analysing whose artefacts Giovanni Battista de Rossi discovered the catacomb in 1877.

It has a main gallery in line with the entrance staircase and two side arms starting at the entrance and heading in opposite directions. Its main monument, known as the 'cubiculum of the Last Judgement' at the end of the main gallery, dates to the mid 3rd century and is completely frescoed, with one on the vault of the Last Judgement.
