= Torre Spaccata =

Torre Spaccata or Torrespaccata may refer to:

- Torre Spaccata (zone of Rome), Italy, zone 12 in Municipio V and VI
  - Torre Spaccata (Rome Metro), metro station in Torre Spaccata, Rome
- Torrespaccata, urban planning zone 8A of Municipio VII, Rome
