= Polline Martignano =

- Zona of Rome
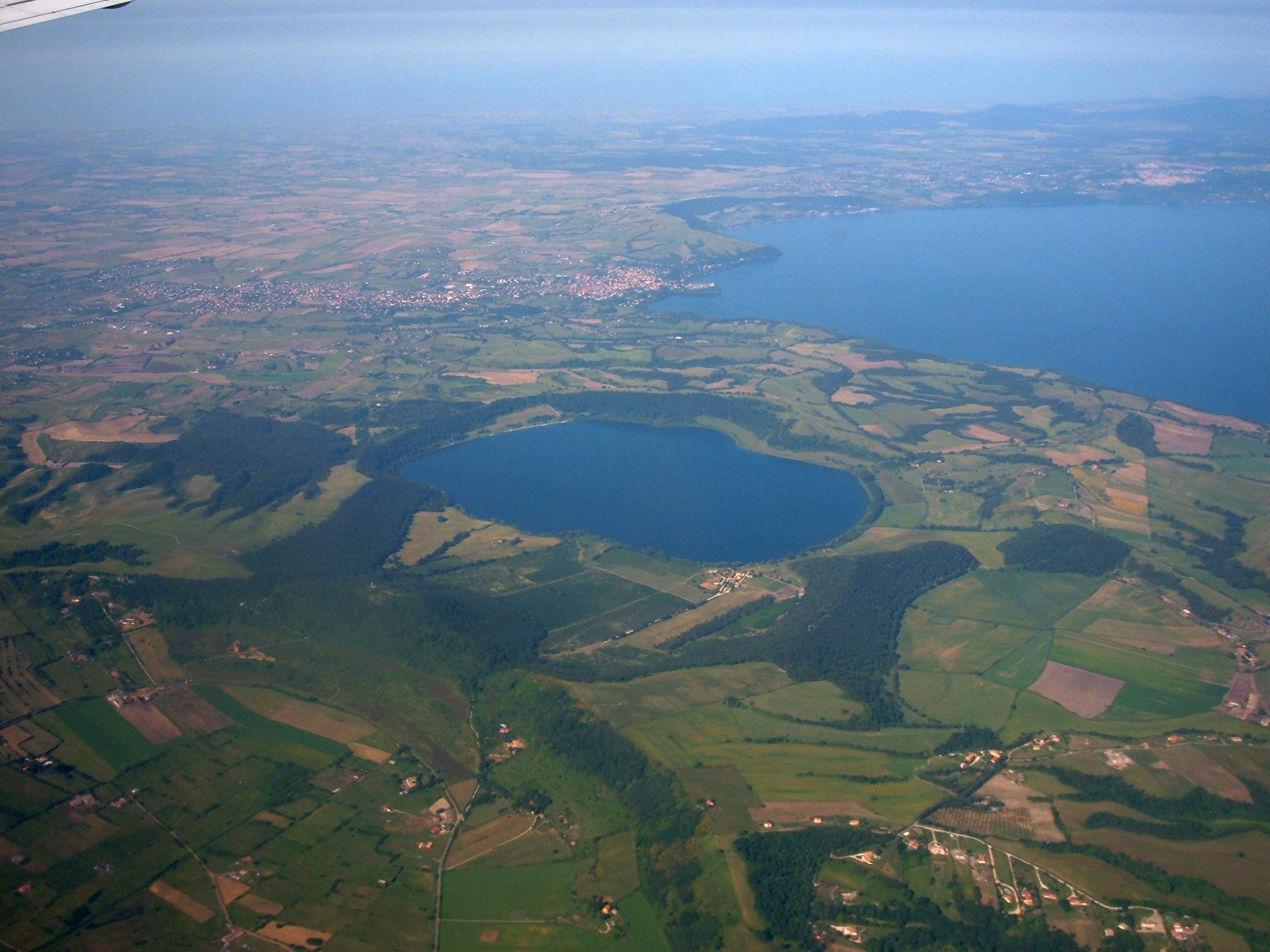
- The Lake Martignano

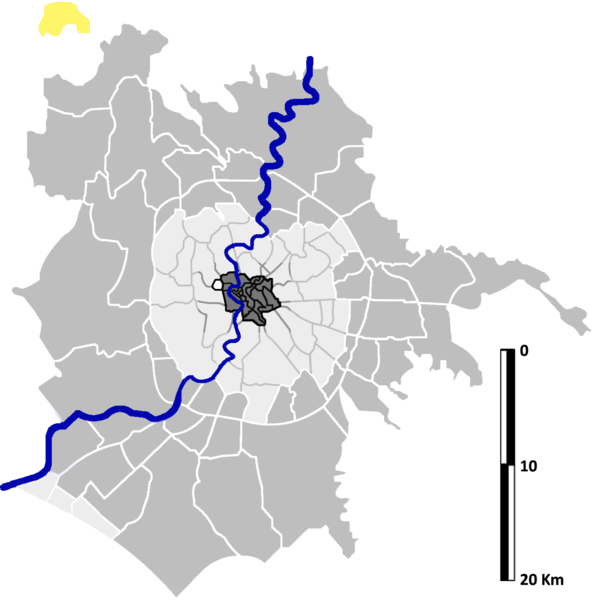
- Position of the zona within the city
- Country: Italy
- Region: Lazio
- Province: Rome
- Comune: Rome

Area
  - Total: 4.2191 sq mi (10.9273 km^{2})

Population (2016)
  - Total: 40
  - Density: 9.5/sq mi (3.66/km^{2})
- Time zone: UTC+1 (CET)
  - Summer (DST): UTC+2 (CEST)

Polline Martignano is the 59th zona of the Italian capital Rome, abbreviated as Z. LIX. It belongs to the Municipio XV and has 40 inhabitants (2016). It is located as an exclave in the northwest of the city and it is surrounded by the municipalities of Anguillara Sabazia, Campagnano di Roma and Trevignano Romano.

== History ==
The zone of Polline Martignano was founded on September 13, 1961, when, according to a resolution of the Commissario Straordinario, the Ager Romanus was divided into 59 zones, identified by the prefix Z. and a Roman numeral.

== Geography ==
The zone overlooks the Lake Martignano (lacus Alsietinus) and includes, at the border with Campagnano di Roma, the dried out Lake Stracciacappa (lacus Papyrianus). The zone is also very close to Lake Bracciano (lacus Sabatinus).

The territory of the zone includes the urban zone 20O Martignano.

=== Boundaries ===
Northward, Polline Martignano borders with the municipality of Trevignano Romano.

To the east, it shares the border with the comune of Campagnano di Roma.

Southward and westward, the zone borders with the comune of Anguillara Sabazia.

=== Odonymy ===
The zone only includes five roads, whose name recalls some local toponyms: Via Massa Clodiana, Via Montagna Spaccata, Via Piana del Pero, Lungolago di Polline, Via di Polline.

== Places of interest ==
=== Civil buildings ===
- Torre di Stirpa Cappe. A 13th-century tower. 42.136516°N 12.319369°E

The only architectural feature left of the medieval borough of Stirpe Cappe, that had strategical relevance in order to control the transit on the Via Cassia.

- Casale di Martignano. A 15th-century farmstead. 42.121791°N 12.322220°E

=== Natural areas ===
- Natural Regional Park of the Lakes Bracciano and Martignano
- Lake Martignano
