= Annunciazione della Beata Vergine Maria a Via Ardeatina =

- Church of the Annunciation of the Blessed Virgin Mary on the Ardeatine Way
- Chiesa della Santissima Annunziata a Via Ardeatina
- Location within Rome
- 41°50′08″N 12°30′43″E
- Location: Via di Grotta Perfetta 591, Q. Ardeatino, Rome
- Country: Italy
- Language: Italian
- Denomination: Catholic
- Tradition: Roman Rite
- Website: santissimaannunziata.it

History
- Status: titular church, parish church
- Dedication: Annunciation
- Dedicated: 1987

Architecture
- Functional status: active
- Architect: Ignazio Breccia Fratadocchi
- Architectural type: Modern
- Groundbreaking: 1985
- Completed: 1988

Administration
- Diocese: Rome

Annunciazione della Beata Vergine Maria a Via Ardeatina is a 20th-century parochial church and titular church on the southern edge of Rome, dedicated to the Annunciation and located on the ancient Via Ardeatina.

== History ==
Annunciazione della Beata Vergine Maria a Via Ardeatina was built in 1985–88, replacing an old church known as Annunziatella due to its small size.

On 5 February 1965, the old Annunziatella was made a titular church to be held by a cardinal-deacon, but was never actually given to a cardinal, until the new church was given a titular in 2001.

Cardinal-Protectors

- Mario Francesco Pompedda (2001–2006)
- Domenico Calcagno (2012–present)
