= Pope Mark I =

Pope Mark I may refer to:

- Mark the Evangelist, Pope and Patriarch of Alexandria (43–68)
- Pope Mark, Bishop of Rome (18 January - 7 October 336)
