= Domenico Calcagno =

Italian prelate of the Catholic Church

His Eminence Domenico Calcagno
- President Emeritus of the Administration of the Patrimony of the Apostolic See
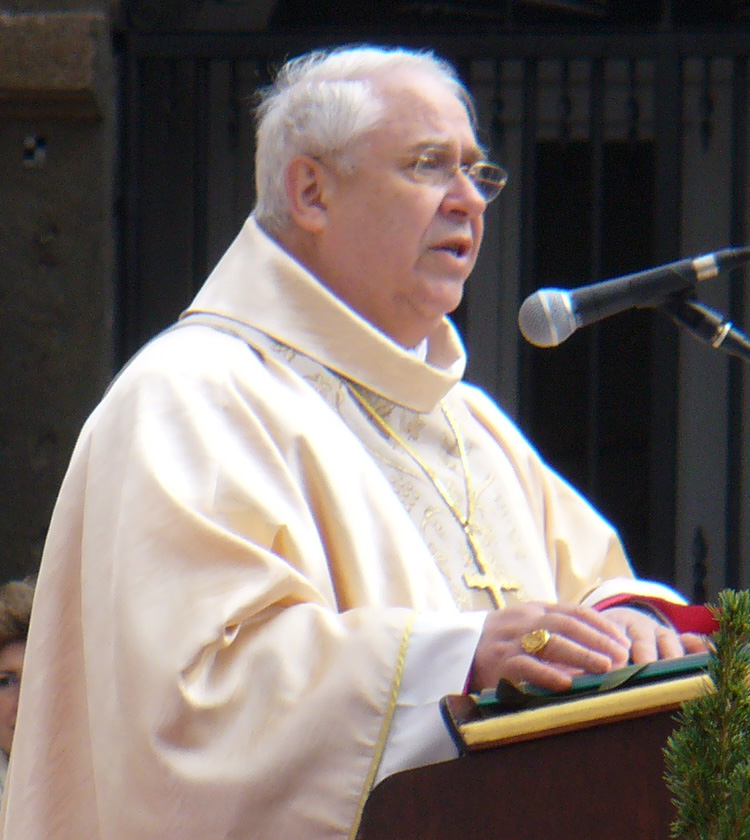
- Calcagno in 2007
- Church: Roman Catholic Church
- Appointed: 7 July 2011
- Term ended: 26 June 2018
- Predecessor: Attilio Nicora
- Successor: Nunzio Galantino
- Other post: Cardinal priest of Annunciazione della Beata Vergine Maria a Via Ardeatina
- Previous posts: Bishop of Savona-Noli (2002–2007); Secretary of the Administration of the Patrimony of the Apostolic See (2007–2011)

Orders
- Ordination: 29 June 1967 by Giuseppe Siri
- Consecration: 9 March 2002 by Dionigi Tettamanzi
- Created cardinal: 18 February 2012 by Benedict XVI
- Rank: Cardinal deacon (2012–22); Cardinal priest (2022–present)

Personal details
- Born: Domenico Calcagno; 3 February 1943 (age 83) Tramontana, Italy
- Denomination: Roman Catholic
- Education: Pontifical Gregorian University
- Motto: In veritate libertas
- Coat of arms

Styles of Domenico Calcagno
- Reference style: His Eminence
- Spoken style: Your Eminence
- Religious style: Cardinal
- Informal style: Cardinal

Domenico Calcagno (born 3 February 1943) is an Italian prelate of the Catholic Church. He has been a bishop since 2002 and a cardinal since 2012. From 7 July 2011 to 26 June 2018, he was President of the Administration of the Patrimony of the Holy See, where he had served as secretary since 2007.

== Biography ==
Calcagno was born in Tramontana di Parodi Ligure, in the Province of Alessandria on 3 February 1943. After studying arts at the diocesan seminary, he attended the Pontifical Gregorian University in Rome, earning a degree in dogmatic theology. He was ordained a priest on 29 June 1967 by Cardinal Giuseppe Siri.

After several years of parish ministry, he was appointed professor of theology at the Theological Faculty of Northern Italy and, later, at the Higher Institute of Religious Studies of Liguria. He served as president of the diocesan clergy institute and was the episcopal vicar for "new activities". At the national level, his assignments included: Secretary of the Italian Priests Commission, Inspector of the Italian Episcopal Conference for Institutes of Religious Sciences, Director of National Missionary Cooperation between Churches, and Treasurer of the Bishops Conference.

Pope John Paul II appointed him Bishop of Savona-Noli on 25 January 2002. He was consecrated on 9 March. He served as Bishop of Savona until Pope Benedict appointed him Secretary of the Administration of the Patrimony of the Apostolic See (APSA) and with the personal title of archbishop on 7 July 2007. On 7 July 2011 he became its president.

On 20 February 2012 Pope Benedict created him Cardinal-Deacon assigned to the church of Annunciazione della Beata Vergine Maria a Via Ardeatina.

He was one of the cardinal electors who participated in the 2013 papal conclave that elected Pope Francis.

Pope Francis made him a member of the Congregation for Institutes of Consecrated Life and Societies of Apostolic Life on 29 March 2014.

In October 2016, when several cardinals protested his plan for the APSA to lease commercial space to McDonald's in a building where several cardinals live not far from St. Peter's Basilica, he dismissed their complaints. He said, "I don't see the scandal."

Francis accepted his resignation as President of the Administration of the Patrimony of the Holy See on 26 June 2018.

On 4 March 2022, he was elevated to the rank of cardinal priest.

Catholic Church titles
Preceded by Dante Lafranconi	Bishop of Savona-Noli; 25 January 2002 – 7 July 2007	Succeeded by Vittorio Lupi
Preceded by Claudio Maria Celli	Secretary of the Administration of the Patrimony of the Apostolic See; 7 July 2007 – 7 July 2011	Succeeded by Luigi Misto
Preceded by Attilio Nicora	President of the Administration of the Patrimony of the Apostolic See; 7 July 2011 – 26 June 2018	Succeeded by Nunzio Galantino
Preceded by Mario Francesco Pompedda	Cardinal-Deacon of Annunciazione della Beata Vergine Maria a Via Ardeatina; 18 February 2012 –	Incumbent
