= Mario Francesco Pompedda =

Italian cardinal

His Eminence Mario Francesco Pompedda
- President of the Commission for Advocates
- Church: Roman Catholic Church
- Appointed: 7 March 2000
- Term ended: 18 October 2006
- Predecessor: Zenon Grocholewski
- Successor: Agostino Vallini
- Other post: Cardinal-Deacon of Annunciazione della Beata Vergine Maria a Via Ardeatina (2001–06)
- Previous posts: Papal Master of Ceremonies of the Prefecture for Pontifical Celebrations (1967–69); Prelate Auditor of the Roman Rota (1969–93); Dean of the Roman Rota (1993–99); President of the Appeals Court of the Vatican City State (1993–99); President of the Disciplinary Commission of the Roman Curia (1997–99); Titular Archbishop of Bisarcio (1997–2001); Prefect of the Apostolic Signatura (1999–2004); President of the Supreme Court of the Vatican City State (1999–2004)

Orders
- Ordination: 23 December 1951
- Consecration: 6 January 1998 by Pope John Paul II
- Created cardinal: 21 February 2001 by Pope John Paul II
- Rank: Cardinal-deacon

Personal details
- Born: Mario Francesco Pompedda; 18 April 1929 Ozieri, Sardinia, Kingdom of Italy
- Died: 18 October 2006 (aged 77) Agostino Gemelli University Policlinic, Rome, Italy
- Buried: Ozieri Cathedral (since 2010)
- Education: Pontifical Gregorian University; Pontifical Biblical Institute; Pontifical Lateran University
- Motto: Soli Deo
- Coat of arms

Carlo Mario Francesco Pompedda (18 April 1929 – 18 October 2006) was an Italian cardinal of the Roman Catholic Church and the Prefect of the Apostolic Signatura for the Roman Curia. He spent nearly fifty years in a variety of posts within the Catholic Church's ecclesiastical court system, from 1955 to 2004.

== Biography ==
Pompedda was born in Ozieri in Sardinia. He studied at seminaries in Sassari and Cuglieri and was ordained a priest in Rome on 23 December 1951. He obtained a doctorate in theology from the Pontifical Gregorian University, and a doctorate in utroque iure (in civil law and canon law) from the Pontifical Lateran University. He became an officer of the Roman Rota, the general appellate court of the Catholic Church, in 1955, serving as a defender of the bond. He joined the tribunal as an auditor in 1969 and served in that capacity until he became Dean of the Roman Rota in 1993. He was appointed Prefect of the Supreme Tribunal of the Apostolic Signatura, the highest tribunal in the church, in 1999. He resigned this position, as is customary, upon reaching the age of 75, on 18 April 2004, and his resignation was accepted on 27 May 2004.

Pompedda was appointed titular Archbishop of Bisarcio on 29 November 1997 and consecrated on 6 February 1998. He was proclaimed a Cardinal-Deacon of Santissima Annunciazione della Beata Vergine Maria a Via Ardeatina by Pope John Paul II on 21 February 2001. He was one of the cardinal electors who participated in the 2005 papal conclave that selected Pope Benedict XVI. It was suspected that he may have been the source of information about the conclave published in the Italian journalist Lucio Brunelli in the journal Limes in September 2005; many also suspected that the information was false.

Styles of Mario Francesco Pompedda
- Reference style: His Eminence
- Spoken style: Your Eminence
- Informal style: Cardinal
- See: Bisarcio (titular)

Cardinal Pompedda also served as president of the appellate court of Vatican City and, from 1999, as president of the Court of Cassation of Vatican City. He is credited with drafting Universi Dominici Gregis.

Pompedda taught canon law at the Pontifical Gregorian University. He was also involved in the revision of the code of canon law in 1983, the first substantial revision since 1917. He was also the principal editor of Universi Dominici Gregis, the apostolic constitution of Pope John Paul II published in 1995, which set the rules for the sede vacante and papal conclave. He supported proposals to make it easier to obtain an annulment of marriage, and gave several public lectures in 2003 outlining the changes. He retired before the changes were implemented, and the final document, Dignitas connubii, did not go as far he had expected, reaffirming existing doctrine instead.

Pompedda was appointed as the Cardinal Grand Prior of the Sacred Military Constantinian Order of Saint George by order of the Grand Master, the Duke of Castro. In November 2003, he became the Ecclesiastical Counsellor of the Order by appointment of Pope John Paul II. This position continued under Pope Benedict XVI.

== Death and funeral ==
Cardinal Pompedda died in Rome of a brain hemorrhage. He was buried in a tomb in the cathedral in Ozieri.

On 18 February 2010, his remains were reinterred in a specially constructed sarcophagus in the cathedral of Ozieri at the chapel of the Most Holy Sacrament. The requiem mass was celebrated at 5 pm, presided by Bishop Sergio Pintor of Ozieri. At the end of the mass, Mgr Giuseppe Sciacca, judge of the Roman Rota and a long time collaborator of Cardinal Pompedda, read a special message sent for the occasion by Tarcisio Cardinal Bertone, S.D.B., secretary of State, in the name of Pope Benedict XVI.

== Publications ==
Pompedda wrote and co-wrote several books, including;

- Il matrimonio nel nuovo codice di diritto canonico: Annotazioni di diritto sostanziale e processuale (Marriage in the New Code of Canon Law: Annotations on Substantive and Procedural Law) (with Cesare Zaggia and Zenon Grocholewski)
- Matrimonio e sacramento Intenzionalità sacramentale (Marriage and the Sacrament Sacramental Intentionality)
- Studi di diritto processuale canonico (Studies in Canon Procedural Law)

Catholic Church titles
Preceded by Zenon Grocholewski	Prefect of the Supreme Tribunal of the Apostolic Signatura; 15 November 1999 – 27 May 2004	Succeeded by Agostino Vallini
