= Santi Andrea e Bartolomeo (Rome) =

Church of St. Andrew and St. Bartholomew
- Chiesa dei Santi Andrea e Bartolomeo
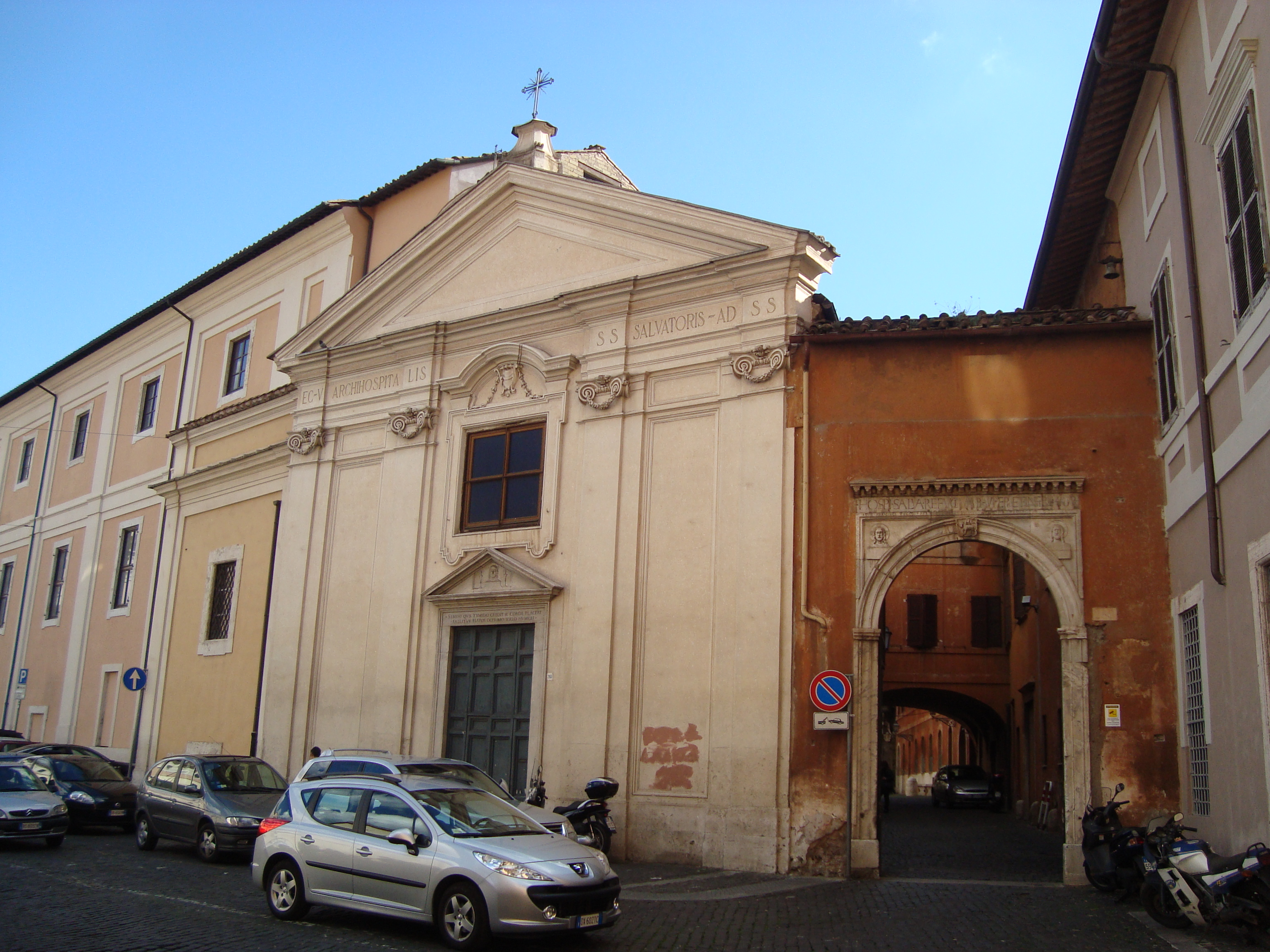
- Church of St. Andrew and St. Bartholomew
- 41.8870°N 12.5028°E
- Location: Rome, Via di San Giovanni in Laterano, 280/a
- Country: Italy
- Denomination: Catholic, Roman Rite

Architecture
- Style: Baroque
- Groundbreaking: 1630
- Completed: 1636

Santi Andrea e Bartolomeo is a Catholic church in Rome (Italy), in the Rione Monti, on Via Santo Stefano Rotondo.

== History ==
Of very ancient origins, its history is linked to that of the hospital of San Giovanni.
The primitive church was built on the family home of Pope Honorius I (who died in 638), together with the monastery, as recalled in the biography of Pope Adrian I: «monasterium ss. Andreae et Bartholomaei, quod appellatur Honorii papae». During the 14th century the church was completely renovated, then rebuilt between 1630 and 1636 by Giacomo Mola under the pontificate of Urban VIII and finally transformed in eighteenth-century style in 1728, when the facade – which incorporates a fifteenth-century portal – was completed.

== Description ==
The church is almost triangular in shape; the Cosmatesque floor was created by the guardians of the Archconfraternity of the Holy Savior, Marco Diotaiuti and Giovanni Bonadies, in 1462.
It has only one altar at the bottom of the apse and contains a fresco in Byzantine style, which belonged to the chapel (later demolished) of St. Mary the Empress near the monastery of Santi Quattro Coronati.

== Bibliography ==
- M. Armellini (1891). "Le chiese di Roma dal secolo IV al XIX". Rome. p. 115.
- C. Hulsen (1927). "Le chiese di Roma nel Medio Evo". Florence. p. 195.
- Claudio Rendina (2000). Le Chiese di Roma. Milan: Newton & Compton Editori. pp. 25–31. ISBN 8854188352.
- Alberto Manodori (2000). "Rione I Monti". I rioni di Roma'. Vol. I Vol. Milan: Newton & Compton Editori. p. 52.
