= Annunziatella =

Church building in Rome, Italy

Coordinates: 41°50′08″N 12°30′41″E

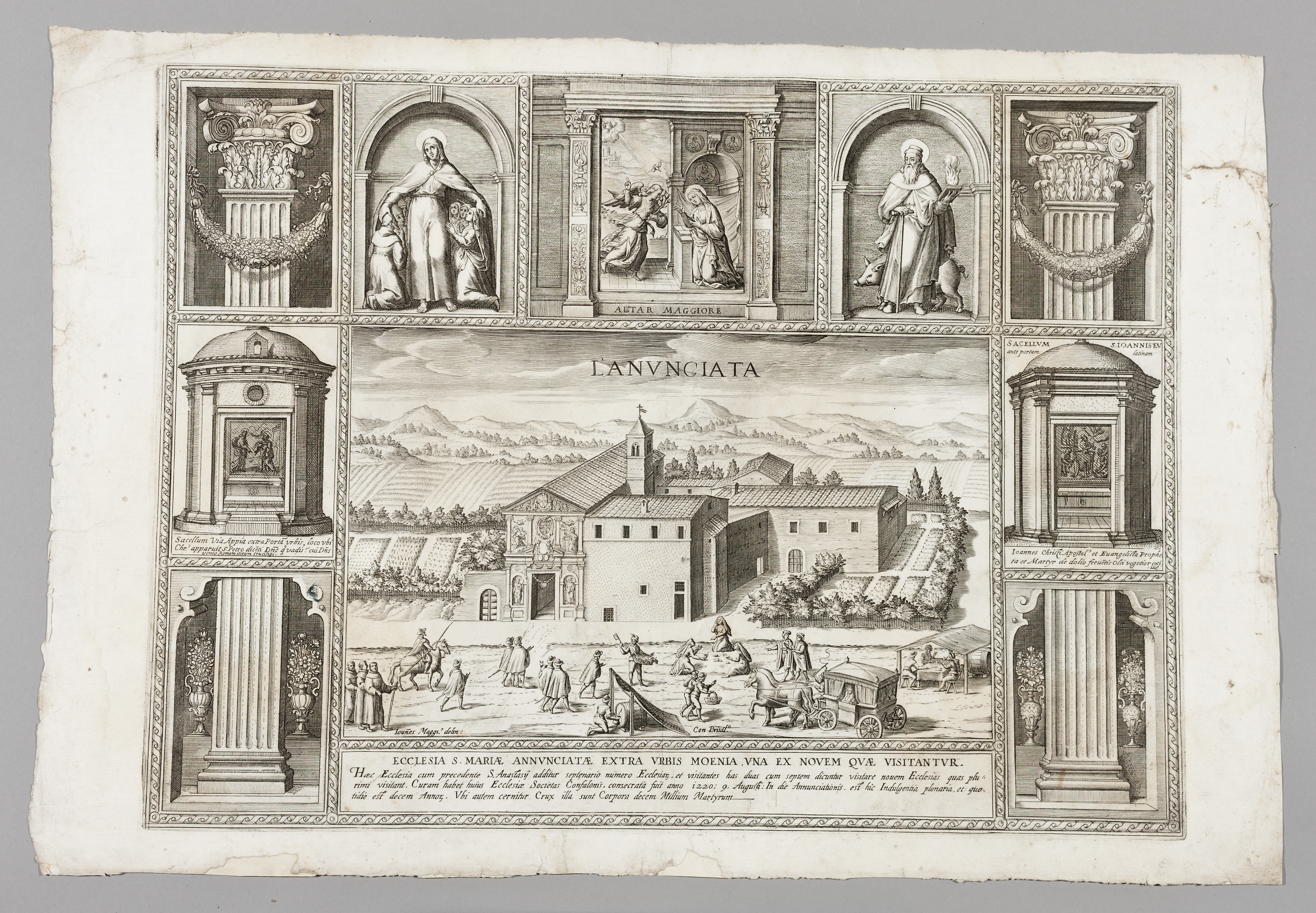
The church in a 17th century print by Giovanni Maggi.

The Annunziatella is a Roman Catholic church in the Ardeatino quarter of Rome between via Ardeatina and via di Grotta Perfetta. Beneath it is the Catacomb of the Nunziatella.

An inscription inside the church by Pope Honorius III dating to 12 August 1220 states it was one of those dedicated to Mary of the Annunciation, hence the nickname Annunziatella.

== Bibliography (in Italy) ==
- Darko Senekovic, S. Maria Annunziata, in: D. Mondini, C. Jäggi, P. C. Claussen, Die Kirchen der Stadt Rom im Mittelalter 1050-1300, Band 4 (M-O), Stuttgart, 2020, pp. 69–77.
- Mariano Armellini, Le chiese di Roma dal secolo IV al XIX, Roma 1891, pp. 913-914
- C. Rendina, Le Chiese di Roma, Newton & Compton Editori, Roma 2000, p. 35 ISBN 978-88-541-1833-1
- Gianfranco De Rossi, La Chiesa dell'Annunziatella, maggio 1998
