= Luigi Mistò =

- Secretary of the Administrative Section of the Secretariat for the Economy
- Church: Roman Catholic Church
- Appointed: 14 April 2015
- Other post: President of the Pontifical Commission for the Activities of Public Juridical Persons of the Church in the Healthcare Sector (2016–)
- Previous post: Secretary of the Administration of the Patrimony of the Apostolic See (2011–15)

Orders
- Ordination: 12 June 1976 by Giovanni Colombo

Personal details
- Born: Luigi Mistò; 24 June 1952 (age 74) Binago, Italy
- Education: Pontifical Lombard Seminary; Pontifical Gregorian University

Luigi Mistò (born 24 June 1952) was the secretary of the Administration of the Patrimony of the Apostolic See from his appointment by Pope Benedict XVI on 7 July 2011 until 2015. He had previously served as Director of the Higher Institute of Religious Studies and Paul VI Ambrosian Foundation in Villa Cagnola Gazzada Schianno, Province of Varese and Head of Service of the Archdiocese of Milan for the Promotion of Economic Support to the Church.

Mistò was born in Binago, (Como Province, Archdiocese of Milan) in 1952. He was ordained a priest on 12 June 1976 for the Archdiocese of Milan. He was a student in Rome at the Pontifical Lombard Seminary (1976-1979). He received his doctorate in Canon Law at the Pontifical Gregorian University in Rome in 1981.

Mistò served as a professor of canon law in the seminary of Milan (Seveso, 1979-1983; Venegono Inferiore, 1983-1999), and chancellor of the curia from 1999-2004 and as a member of the Board of Directors of the Istituto Centrale Sostentamento Clero (2001-2011). He was appointed Chaplain of His Holiness on 6 November 2001.

He served as Director of the Higher Institute of Religious Studies and the Fondazione Ambrosiana Paolo VI in Villa Cagnola Gazzada Schianno, Province of Varese, and director of the Diocesan Service for the Promotion of Economic Support to the Church and Regional Commissioner, and Professor of Public Law at the Ecclesiastical Seminary of Milan and the Ecclesiastical Law Institute of St. Pius X in Venice. He was appointed an honorary canon of the Metropolitan Chapter of the Basilica of Milan in recognition to his service to the Archdiocese of Milan.

He was appointed as secretary of the Administration of the Patrimony of the Apostolic See in succession to Archbishop Domenico Calcagno, who was appointed president.

Catholic Church titles
Preceded by Domenico Calcagno	Secretary of the Administration of the Patrimony of the Apostolic See; 7 July 2011 – 14 April 2015	Succeeded by Mauro Rivella
