= Zones of Rome =

Subdivisions of the Rome metropolitan area

The current 53 zones of Rome

The zones of Rome (Italian: zone di Roma) are toponymic subdivisions within the area of the Ager Romanus, belonging to the Municipalities of Rome and Fiumicino, Italy.

They constitute the fourth and final level of toponymy subdivisions of the Municipality of Rome and cover, considering only the areas within its competence, a surface of approximately 1,028 km^{2} (397 sq mi). The total resident population is 979,446 inhabitants.

== History ==
By resolution of the Special Commissioner Nr. 2453 dated 13 September 1961, due to the new urbanization, the entire area of the Ager Romanus falling in the Municipality of Rome was divided into 59 areas, coded with the letter Z followed by Roman numbers.

In 1992, with the constitution of the Municipality of Fiumicino, six whole areas and part of three others were assigned to the new Municipality, then officially suppressed with resolution of the Special Commissioner Nr. 1529 of 8 September 1993. This is marked on the below list by placing the former zone in italics.

The following table lists the 59 zones established in 1961.

- Z.I – Val Melaina
- Z.II – Castel Giubileo
- Z.III – Marcigliana
- Z.IV – Casal Boccone
- Z.V – Tor San Giovanni
- Z.VI – Settecamini
- Z.VII – Tor Cervara
- Z.VIII – Tor Sapienza
- Z.IX – Acqua Vergine
- Z.X – Lunghezza
- Z.XI – San Vittorino
- Z.XII – Torre Spaccata
- Z.XIII – Torre Angela
- Z.XIV – Borghesiana
- Z.XV – Torre Maura
- Z.XVI – Torrenova
- Z.XVII – Torre Gaia
- Z.XVIII – Capannelle
- Z.XIX – Casal Morena
- Z.XX – Aeroporto di Ciampino
- Z.XXI – Torricola
- Z.XXII – Cecchignola
- Z.XXIII – Castel di Leva
- Z.XXIV – Fonte Ostiense
- Z.XXV – Vallerano
- Z.XXVI – Castel di Decima
- Z.XXVII – Torrino
- Z.XXVIII – Tor de' Cenci
- Z.XXIX – Castel Porziano
- Z.XXX – Castel Fusano
- Z.XXXI – Mezzocammino
- Z.XXXII – Acilia Nord
- Z.XXXIII – Acilia Sud
- Z.XXXIV – Casal Palocco
- Z.XXXV – Ostia Antica
- Z.XXXVI – Isola Sacra
- Z.XXXVII – Fiumicino
- Z.XXXVIII – Fregene
- Z.XXXIX – Tor di Valle
- Z.XL – Magliana Vecchia
- Z.XLI – Ponte Galeria
- Z.XLII – Maccarese Sud
- Z.XLIII – Maccarese Nord
- Z.XLIV – La Pisana
- Z.XLV – Castel di Guido
- Z.XLVI – Torrimpietra
- Z.XLVII – Palidoro
- Z.XLVIII – Casalotti
- Z.XLIX – Santa Maria di Galeria
- Z.L – Ottavia
- Z.LI – La Storta
- Z.LII – Cesano
- Z.LIII – Tomba di Nerone
- Z.LIV – La Giustiniana
- Z.LV – Isola Farnese
- Z.LVI – Grottarossa
- Z.LVII – Labaro
- Z.LVIII – Prima Porta
- Z.LIX – Polline Martignano

== See also ==
- Ager Romanus
- Suburbs of Rome
- Administrative subdivision of Rome

== Bibliography ==
- Antonietta Brancati (1990). "La Cartografia dell'Agro Romano". Itinerari Didattici d'Arte e di Cultura. Rome: Palombi & Partner. ISSN 0394-9753.
- Comune di Roma, Ripartizione Antichità e Belle arti (1982–1988). Carta storica archeologica monumentale e paesistica del suburbio e dell'agro romano. Rome: Comune di Roma.
- Maria Luisa Marchi; Fiorenzo Catalli (2008). Suburbio di Roma. Una residenza produttiva lungo la via Cornelia. Bari: Edipuglia. ISBN 978-88-7228-494-0.
- S. Mezzapesa (1962). Planimetria di Roma. Suburbio. Agro Romano (5 ed.). Rome: Istituto Cartografico Italiano. OCLC 636568726.
- Paolo Montanari (2009). Sepolcri circolari di Roma e suburbio. Elementi architettonici dell'elevato. Rome: Fabrizio Serra Editore. ISBN 978-88-6227-198-1.
