= Rivelli =

Rivelli is an ancient Italian surname. Notable people with the surname include:

- Galeazzo Rivelli (fl. 14th century), Italian painter
- Luisa Rivelli (born Rossella Lanfranchi, 1931–2013), Italian actress
- Naike Rivelli (born 1974), Italian actress and singer
- Nicola Rivelli (1955–2025), Italian politician
- Ornella Muti (born 1955 as Francesca Romana Rivelli), Italian actress

== See also ==
- Rivella, surname
