= Pope Mark =

Head of the Catholic Church in 336

Pope Saint Mark
- Bishop of Rome
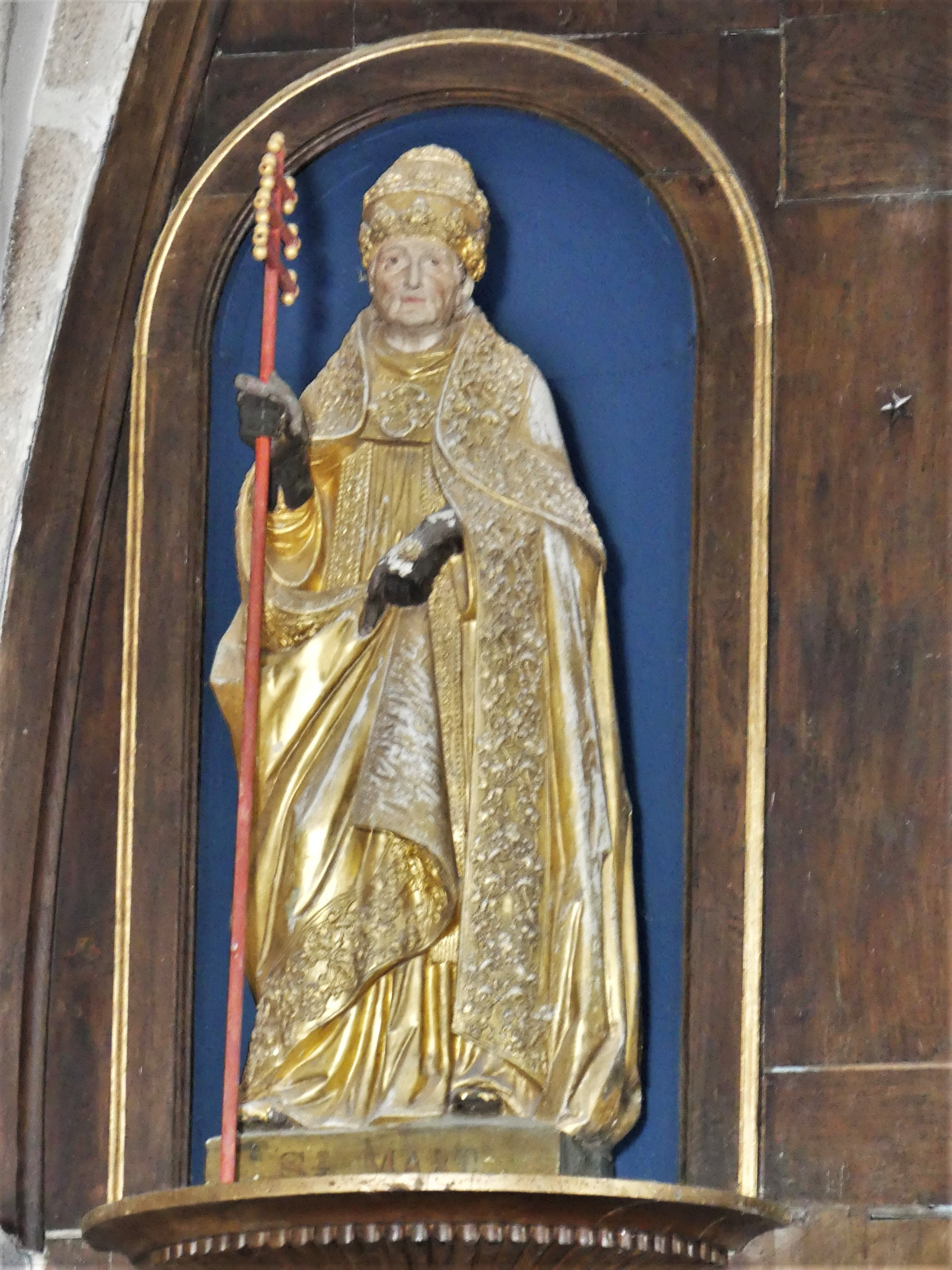
- Statue of Pope Saint Mark in the church of Saint-Marc-à-Loubaud, France.
- Church: Imperial Church
- Papacy began: 18 January 336
- Papacy ended: 7 October 336
- Predecessor: Sylvester I
- Successor: Julius I

Personal details
- Born: Rome, Italy, Roman Empire
- Died: 7 October 336 Rome, Italy, Roman Empire
- Buried: Basilica of San Lorenzo, Florence

Sainthood
- Feast day: 7 October

Pope Mark (Latin: Marcus) was the bishop of Rome from 18 January to his death on 7 October 336.

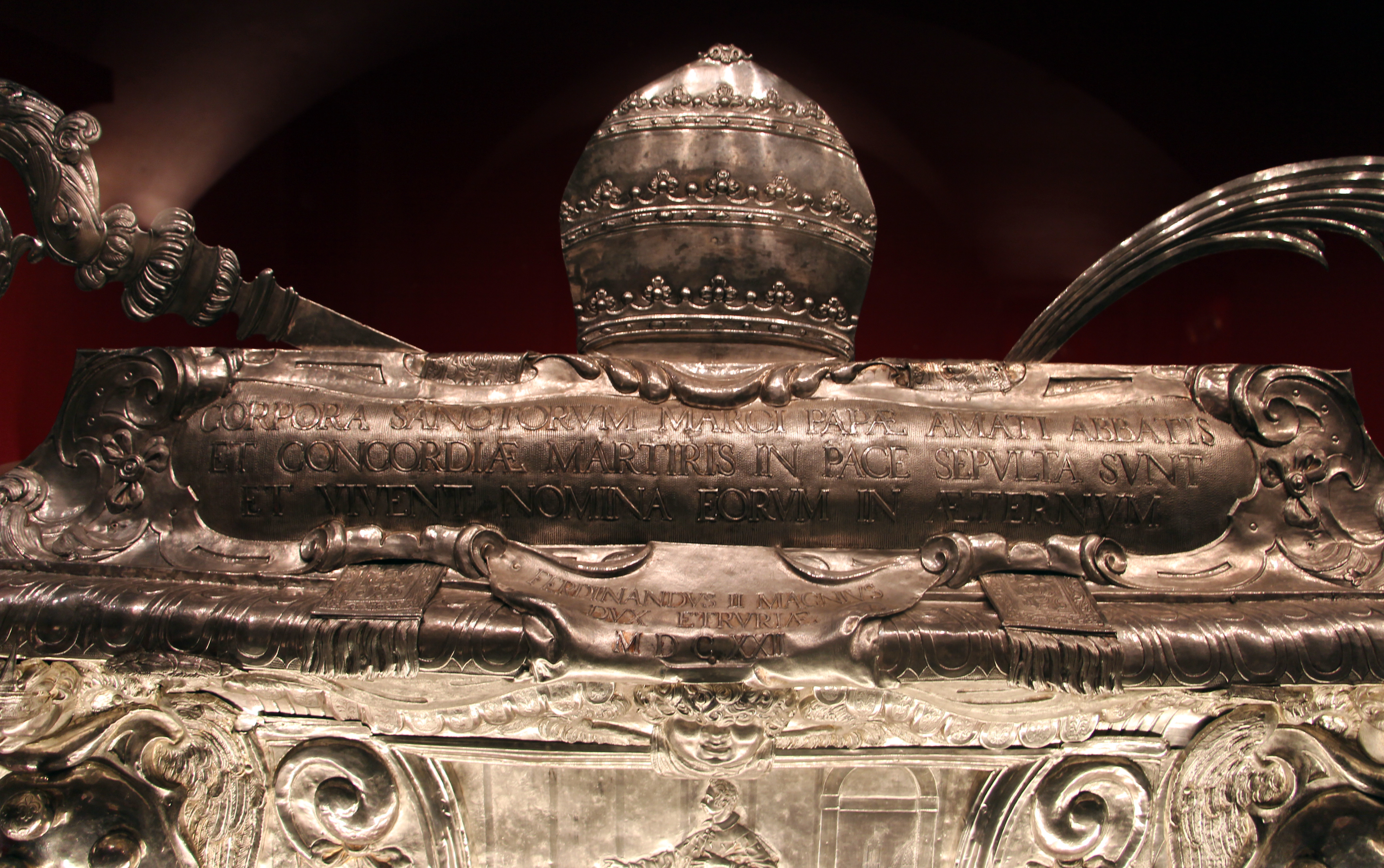
Reliquary of Pope Mark in the Basilica of San Lorenzo, Florence.

Little is known of Mark's early life. According to the Liber Pontificalis, he was a Roman, and his father's name was Priscus. Mark succeeded Sylvester I as pope on 18 January 336.

Some evidence suggests that the early lists of bishops and martyrs known as the Depositio episcoporum and Depositio martyrum were begun during his pontificate. According to the Liber Pontificalis, Pope Mark issued a constitution investing the bishop of Ostia with a pallium and confirming his power to consecrate newly elected popes. Likewise according to the Liber Pontificalis, Pope Mark is credited with the foundation of the Basilica of San Marco, a basilica in Rome, and a cemetery church over the Catacomb of Balbina, just outside the city on lands obtained as a donation from Emperor Constantine.

Mark died of natural causes on 7 October and was buried in the catacomb of Balbina. In 1048, his remains were removed to the town of Velletri, and in 1145 were relocated to the Basilica of San Marco in Rome, where they are kept in an urn under the altar. His feast day is celebrated on 7 October. He is particularly venerated at the Abbadia San Salvatore at Monte Amiata.

== See also ==
- List of Catholic saints
- List of popes

Titles of the Great Christian Church
| Preceded by Sylvester I | Bishop of Rome; 336 | Succeeded by Julius I |
