= Dignitas connubii =

Catholic instructional text

Dignitas connubii is an instruction issued by the Pontifical Council for Legislative Texts on 25 January 2005 on the discipline to be observed in diocesan and interdiocesan tribunals regarding causes of the nullity of marriage. It was compiled in close concert with dicasteries that have a related competence, namely, the Congregation for the Doctrine of the Faith, the Congregation for Divine Worship and the Discipline of the Sacraments, the Supreme Tribunal of the Apostolic Signatura, and the Tribunal of the Roman Rota. It was partially obrogated by the matrimonial nullity trial reforms of Pope Francis in 2015, but remains in effect.

== Purpose ==
According to Cardinal Julián Herranz, then-president of the Pontifical Council for Legislative Texts which issued the instruction, the purpose of Dignitas connubii was to give the ministers of justice (tribunal officers) a practical and convenient guide for handling tribunal work in matrimonial nullity processes. It was intended to serve the same purpose that a similar instruction, Provida Mater, had in 1936 under the 1917 Code of Canon Law.
