= Mauro Rivella =

Roman-catholic clergyman

- Episcopal Vicar for Economic Affairs, Archdiocese of Turin
- Church: Roman Catholic Church
- Previous posts: Secretary of the Administration of the Patrimony of the Apostolic See (2015–20); Delegate of the Ordinary Section of APSA (2013–15)

Orders
- Ordination: 22 May 1988 by Anastasio Ballestrero

Personal details
- Born: 23 June 1963 (age 63)

Mauro Rivella is an Italian Roman Catholic cleric who served as the secretary of the Administration of the Patrimony of the Apostolic See (APSA) from 2015 to 2020 and since 2022 has been the episcopal vicar for economic affairs in the Archdiocese of Turin.

== Early life and activities ==
Rivella was born in Moncalieri and grew up in the Mirafiori Sud neighborhood of Turin. Rivella was ordained a priest of the diocese of Turin in 1998. He held the role of avvocato generale in the diocesan curia and taught canon law in the seminary and theological faculty. Rivella, along with others such as Roberto Repole, has been identified by some commentators as a "boariniano," that is, the member of a group of theologically and politically liberal clerics influenced by Sergio Boarino, who served as the rector of the Turin seminary during the 1980s and 1990s.

Rivella served as director of the juridical office of the Episcopal Conference of Italy (CEI) and then as its subsecretary. During Rivella's term as subsecretary of the CEI, the anti-abuse activist Roberto Mirabile accused Rivella and three other CEI leaders of mishandling a report of priestly pedophilia that Mirabile had submitted to the CEI.

When Rivella's 5-year term as CEI subsecretary was not renewed, he returned to the diocese of Turin to serve as a parish priest in Chieri, but was called back to Rome to serve in APSA after less than a year, a nomination that some saw as a rebuke to CEI leadership. He also served as a consultant for the Pontifical Council for Legislative Texts.

== APSA ==
In 2013, Rivella was appointed delegate of the ordinary section of APSA, the branch of the agency that administers the goods of the Holy See, including real estate. In July 2014, the functions of the ordinary section were transferred to the Secretariat for the Economy before being transferred back to APSA in July 2016.

On 14 April 2015, Rivella was named secretary of APSA. At the time, he was identified by several commentators as a perceived ally of Cardinal George Pell.

=== IDI loan and Papal Foundation grant ===
During Rivella's time at APSA, the entity engaged in a controversial series of activities related to a loan made to an entity associated with the Istituto Dermopatico dell'Immacolata (IDI), a hospital in Rome originally owned by the Italian province of the Sons of the Immaculate Conception (PICFIC), which had gone bankrupt after being used as a vehicle for embezzlement and money laundering.

In 2015, after having been rebuffed after a similar request to the Institute for the Works of Religion (IOR), the Vatican's commercial bank, the temporary administrator of PICFIC and commissioner of the IDI, Cardinal Giuseppe Versaldi, along with Giovanni Angelo Becciu, the substitute of the Vatican Secretariat of State, sought a 50 million euro loan from APSA to the Fondazione Luigi Maria Monti (FLMM), a for-profit partnership of the Vatican Secretariat of State and the Congregation of the Sons of the Immaculate Conception that had been created to take over the IDI and nominally replace PICFIC as the owner of the hospital. APSA granted the loan to the FLMM, possibly in contravention of international regulatory agreements not to provide commercial loans, and in April 2015 the FLMM acquired the IDI for a reported 131 million euros.

In order to remove the loan from APSA's books, officials from the Secretariat of State sought a $25 million grant in June 2017 from the U.S.-based Papal Foundation, whose lay board members were reportedly initially led to believe that the money would go to the IDI rather than to the Holy See. In July 2017, Rivella met personally in Washington, DC, with Theodore McCarrick, then a cardinal and a member of the Papal Foundation's board, who pushed aggressively for the approval of the loan throughout the next year. The grant request created turmoil inside the Papal Foundation, and the disbursement of funds was repeatedly stalled; in the end, the $13 million already disbursed to the Holy See was reclassified as a "loan" against future foundation grants. In October 2019, APSA President Nunzio Galantino stated that APSA had had to write off 30 million euros of the loan after the Papal Foundation grant was stopped. In November 2019, Vatican Secretary of State Pietro Parolin claimed that he was personally responsible for the APSA loan to the FLMM and the request to the Papal Foundation.

=== Audit information request ===
On 3 and 5 May 2017, Rivella sent letters to the dicasteries of the Holy See and related institutions, asking them to provide financial information to their banks and legal and fiscal consultants so that the data could be transmitted in turn to Pricewaterhouse Coopers (PwC), which Rivella stated was carrying out auditing activities for the Holy See. On 8 May, a letter of reply sent to the same entities by Cardinal Pell and Libero Milone of the Secretariat for the Economy stated that APSA did not have the authority to request this information or to provide it to an outside auditing firm, and further stated that PwC's audit of the Vatican had been suspended in 2016.

== Post-APSA ==
After the conclusion of his 5-year term as secretary of APSA, Rivella returned to the diocese of Turin as the pastor of the church of St. Rita. Rivella has been rumored to be a candidate for various bishoprics in northern Italy.

On 20 June 2022, Archbishop Roberto Repole named Rivella episcopal vicar for economic affairs.

Catholic Church titles
Preceded by Luigi Misto	Secretary of the Administration of the Patrimony of the Apostolic See; 14 April 2015 – 15 June 2020	Succeeded by Fabio Gasperini
