= Torre Spaccata (zone of Rome) =

- Zona of Rome
- Position of the zona within the city
- Country: Italy
- Region: Lazio
- Province: Rome
- Comune: Rome

Area
  - Total: 4.8826 km^{2} (1.8852 sq mi)

Population (2016)
  - Total: 12,323
  - Density: 2,523/km^{2} (6,530/sq mi)
- Time zone: UTC+1 (CET)
  - Summer (DST): UTC+2 (CEST)

Torre Spaccata is the twelfth zona of Rome in the Agro Romano area, indicated by the initials Z. XII. Unlike the Rioni, Quartieri, and Suburbi, it is the more rural area of Rome. It belongs to the Municipi V and VI and has 13,193 inhabitants as of 2016. It is located in the east of the city within the Roman ring road A90 and has an area of 4.8826 km^{2}.

== History ==
Torre Spaccata was founded on 13 September 1961, by resolution of the Commissario Straordinario. At that time, the Ager Romanus was divided into 59 zones, each of which was assigned a Roman numeral and a letter Z. Six of these were completely transferred to the newly founded municipality of Fiumicino, and three others were partially transferred.

== Monuments and places of interest ==
=== Civil architecture ===
- Casali della Mistica, on Via della Tenuta della Mistica. Farmhouses from the 19th century. 41.881292°N 12.608596°E
- Former Lanificio Giuseppe Gatti, on Via Prenestina. Industrial warehouse from the 20th century. 41.891723°N 12.595650°E

Designed between 1951 and 1953 by engineer Pier Luigi Nervi. The garage level is characterized by mushroom slabs with isostatic ribs, executed with movable ferrocement formwork, while the ground-floor roof is a shed type supported by prestressed reinforced concrete beams.

=== Religious architecture ===
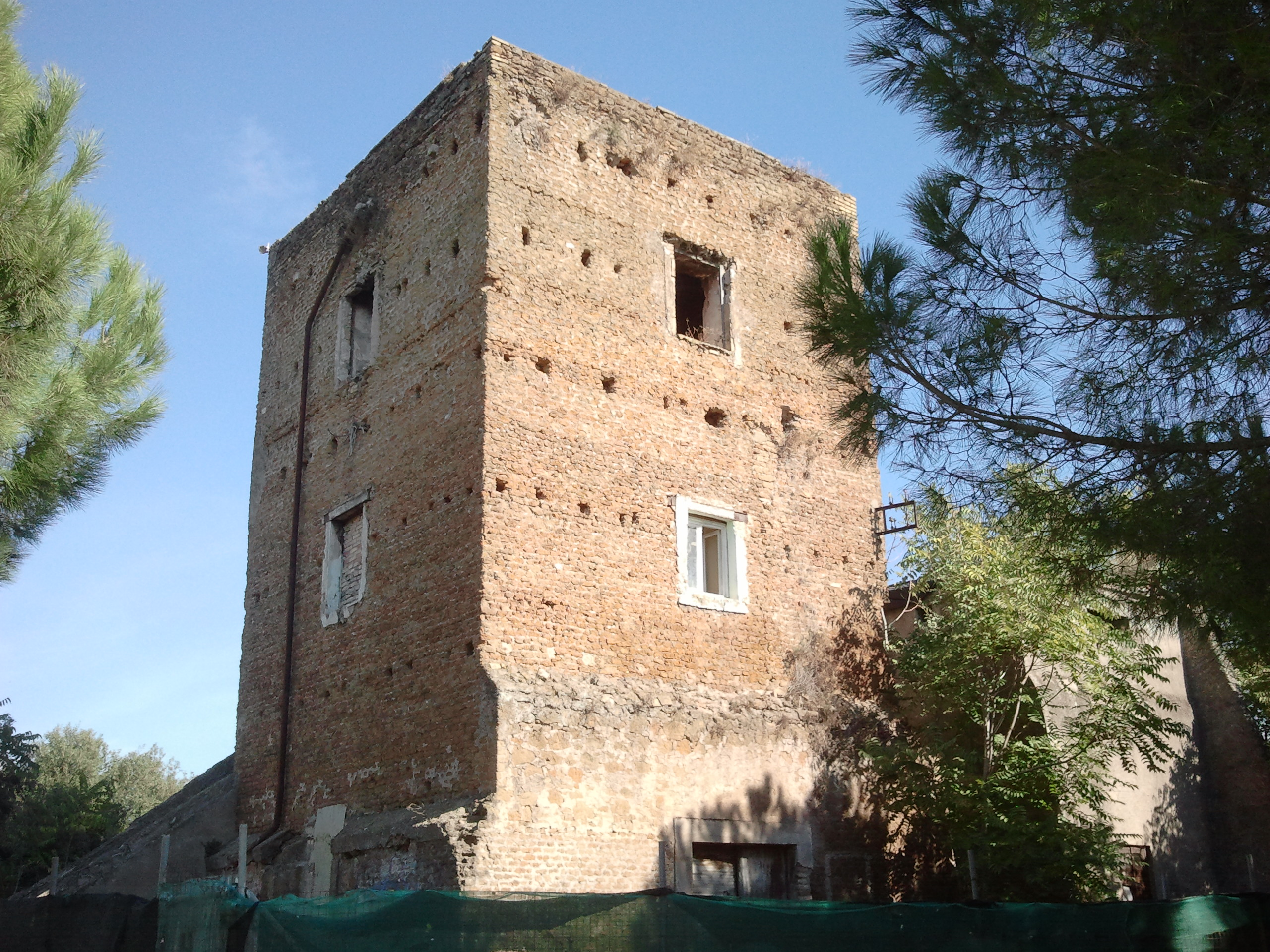
Tower of Casa Calda.

- Chapel of the Istituto di Nostra Signora del Suffragio, on Via dei Colombi. Chapel from the 20th century. 41.869218°N 12.593106°E
- Chapel of Sant'Antonio dell'Omo, on Largo Piccola Lourdes. Modernist-style chapel from the 20th century (1960). 41.892387°N 12.607681°E
- Chiesa di Nostra Signora del suffragio e Sant'Agostino di Canterbury, on Via Walter Tobagi. Church from the 20th century (1998). 41.874451°N 12.597053°E

Parish established on 1 December 1975 by decree Quotidianis curis of the Cardinal Vicar Ugo Poletti.

=== Archaeological sites ===
- Rustic villa of Casa Calda, on Via dei Ruderi di Casa Calda. Villa from the Republican era. 41.875397°N 12.595346°E
- Villa of Torre Spaccata (site 1). Villa from the 1st century BC.
- Villa of Torre Spaccata (site 2), on Via Pietro Sommariva. Villa from the 1st century BC. 41.866722°N 12.573674°E
- Roman villa of Santa Maria dei Ruderi, on Via delle Canapiglie. Villa from the Imperial era. 41.869183°N 12.599847°E
- Section of the Aqua Alexandrina near the Fosso di Tor Tre Teste, in the Tenuta della Mistica. Arches of the Aqua Alexandrina (3rd century). 41.880632°N 12.605164°E
- Oratory of Sant'Erasmo, on Via delle Canapiglie. Medieval church. 41.869112°N 12.600272°E

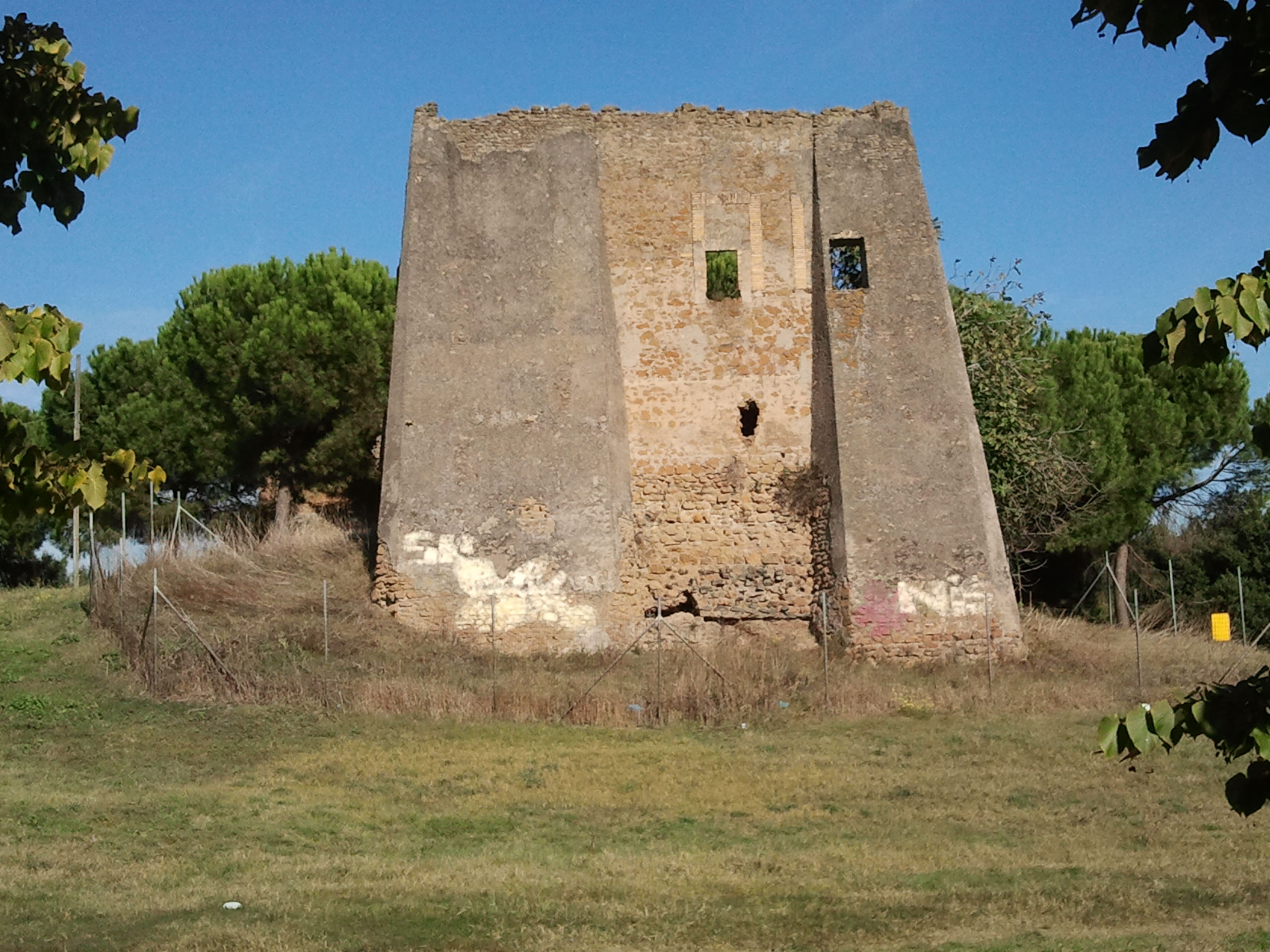
The only remaining wall of the Casa Calda palace.

- Casa Calda complex, on Via dei Ruderi di Casa Calda.

Tower from the 13th century. 41.875669°N 12.595370°E
Wall of a palace from the 16th century. 41.875237°N 12.595514°E

==== The tower ====
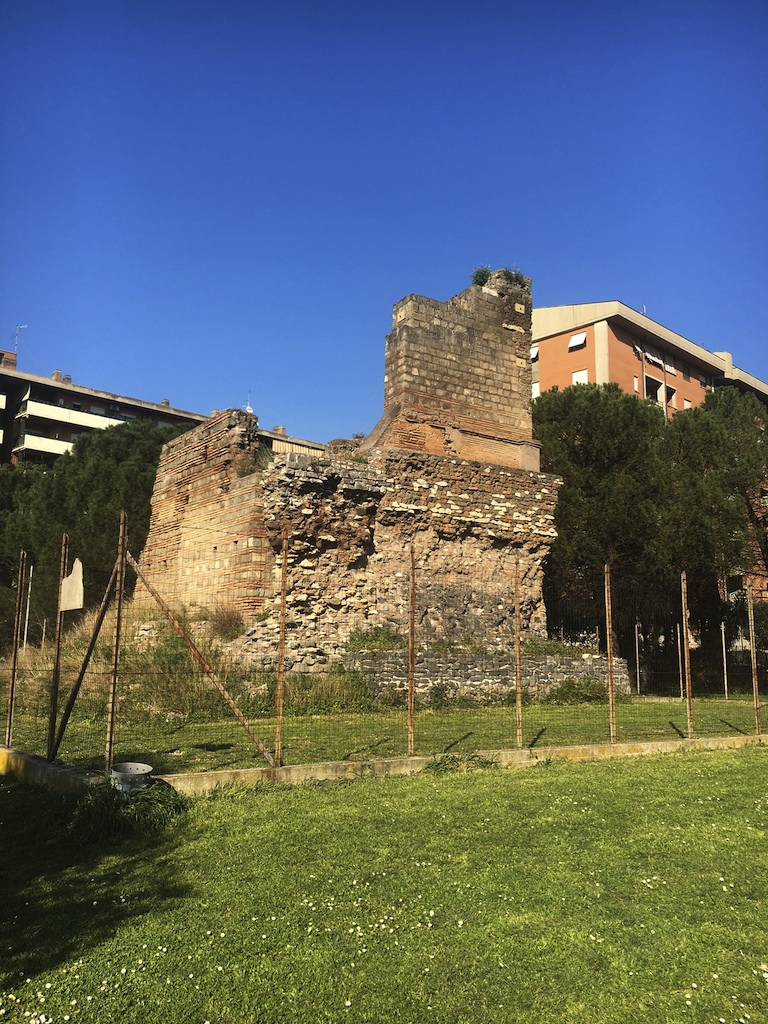
Torre Spaccata.

The namesake tower (Tor Spaccata or Torre Spaccata) is located in the area of Torre Maura, on Via Giovanni Battista Peltechian, in Cinecittà Est. The medieval structure, built upon a Roman tomb, dates to the 9th–10th centuries and was constructed with small tufa blocks alternating with bricks. It has a square base of 8 m per side and a maximum height, of the remaining ruins, of 6 m. Between the 12th and 14th centuries, the walls were refurbished with tufa blocks and retaining masonry. It was used to control the ancient Via Labicana, today's Via Casilina, and the Via Tuscolana.

The ruins still preserve the remains of a Roman brick tomb, specifically a columbarium from the Antonine era (2nd century AD). In 1369 the tower was part of the Casale Palazzetto estate and was sold by the Lateran canon Lorenzo Angeleri to the monastery of Sant'Eufemia. The farmhouse, known as Palaczectum S. Heufemie, passed at the end of the Middle Ages to the Astalli family and later to the Della Valle family.
