= Via Ardeatina =

Ancient road between Rome and Ardea

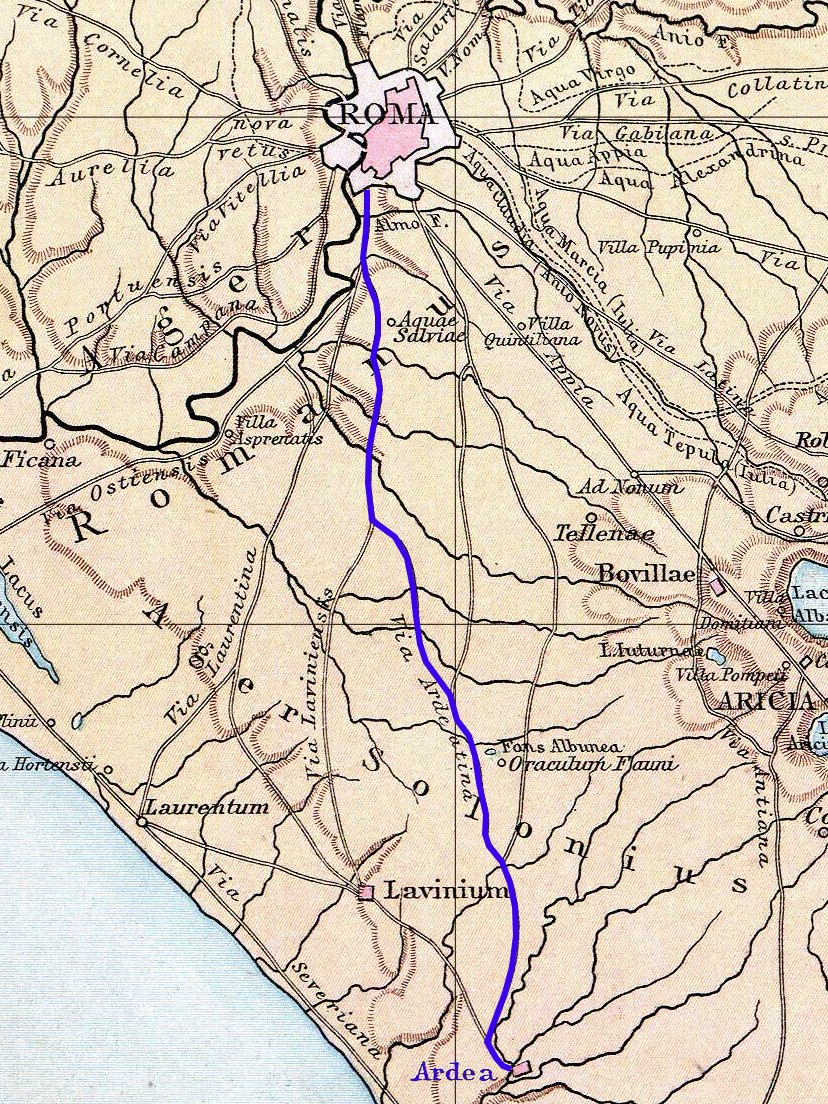
Via Ardeatina

The Via Ardeatina (Ardeatine Way) was an ancient road of Rome leading to the town of Ardea, after which it is named. Ardea lay 24 miles (39 kilometers) distant from Rome.

Its name is seen in the church of Annunciazione della Beata Vergine Maria a Via Ardeatina.
