= Ardeatino =

District in Rome, Italy

Q. XX Ardeatino
- Quartiere of Rome
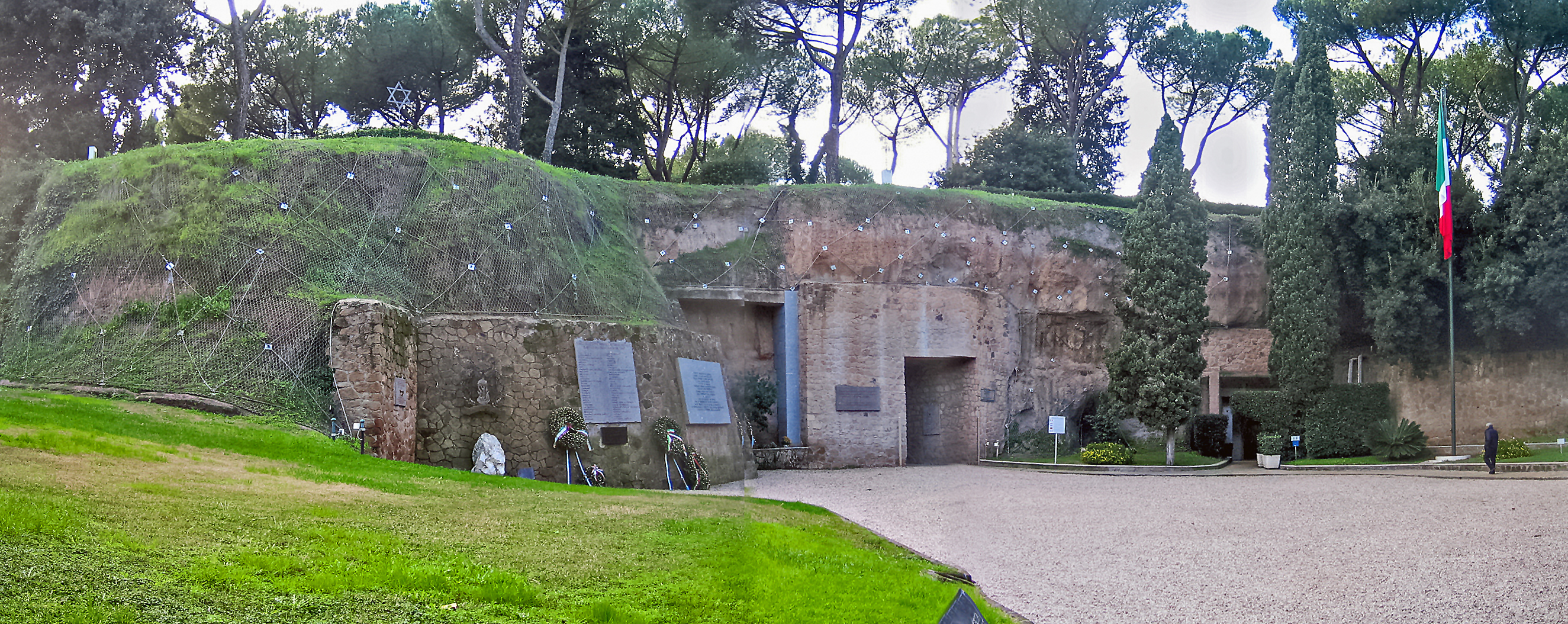
- Entry to caves in the Fosse Ardeatine Monument

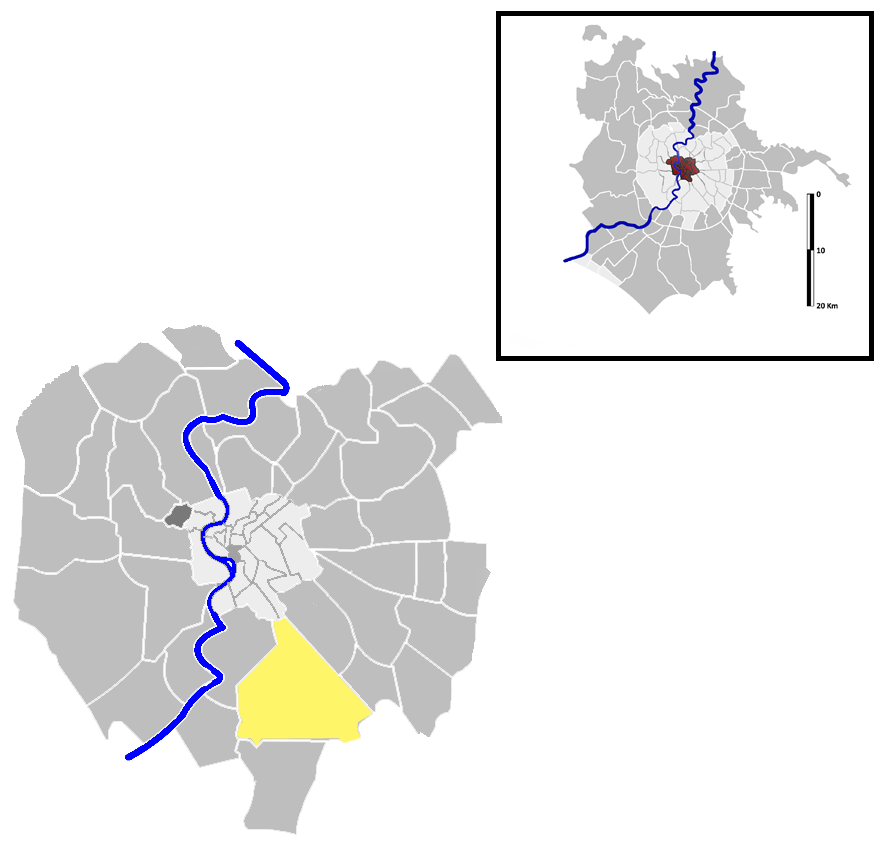
- Position of the quartiere within the city of Rome
- Country: Italy
- Region: Lazio
- Metropolitan City: Rome
- Comune: Rome
- Municipio: Municipio I Municipio VIII
- Established: 13 September 1961

Area
  - Total: 5.68 sq mi (14.71 km^{2})
- Time zone: UTC+1 (CET)
  - Summer (DST): UTC+2 (CEST)

Ardeatino is the 20th quartiere of Rome, identified by the initials "Q. XX". It belongs to the Municipio I and VIII.

== Geography ==
=== Boundaries ===
Northward, the quartiere borders with rioni San Saba (R. XXI) and Celio (R. XIX). Eastward, it borders with the quartiere Appio-Latino (Q. IX) and Appio-Pignatelli (Q. XXVI). Southeastward, it borders with the zona Torricola (Z. XXI). Southward, it borders with the zona Cecchignola (Z. XXII) and quartiere Giuliano-Dalmata (Q. XXXI). Westward, it borders with the quartiere Europa (Q. XXXII) and Ostiense (Q. X).

=== Churches ===
- Annunciazione della Beata Vergine Maria a Via Ardeatina
