= Ager Romanus =

Italian Regional Area

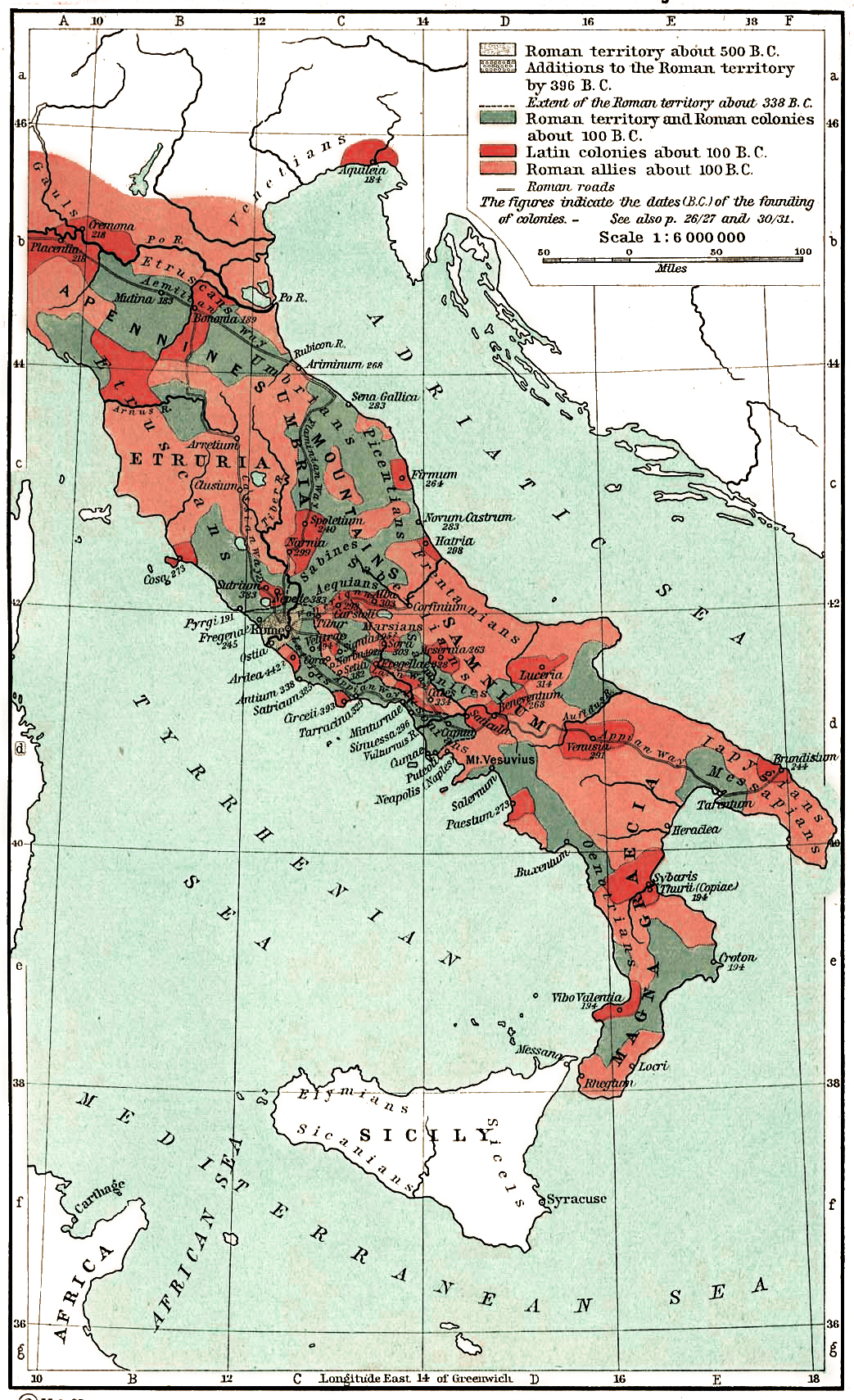
Roman territory c. 100 BC

The Ager Romanus (literally, "the field of Rome"; Italian: Agro romano, lit. 'Roman countryside') is the geographical rural area (part plains, part hilly) that surrounds the city of Rome. Politically and historically, it has represented the area of influence of Rome's municipal government. It is limited to the south by the Monti Prenestini range, Alban Hills and Pontine Marshes; to the west by the Tyrrhenian Sea; to the north by the hills surrounding Lake Bracciano and to the east by the Monti Tiburtini range.

== History ==
=== Ancient Rome ===
The Rome of Romulus and his immediate successors possessed a very restricted territory, as did neighbouring Latin cities such as Praeneste. Such territories were marked by boundary stones, or cippi, used to define and limit the legitimate area of influence of cities, and the boundaries of private landholdings. According to tradition, Rome rapidly outgrew the ager established by its founder, and rather than accept its confinement, Tullus Hostilius razed the Latin city of Alba Longa ca. 635 BC, and incorporated its former territories within the ager Romanus.

With the proclamation of the Roman Republic in 509 BC, all the territory occupied by Romans in "Latium vetus" came to be proclaimed ager publicus, equivalent to state lands today, which were held by the state and could be granted to private citizens. The Roman municipal authorities of this era were the consuls. In effect, Rome was a gigantic city-territory continuously expanding across Europe.

Octavian Augustus founded the office of praefectus urbi and other offices which divided the administration of the city of Rome from that of the Roman Empire. Thus was solved the problem of delimiting the territory of the municipium of Rome from the territory of the rest of the empire – besides the Regio I Latii et Campaniae administered by a specific governor, the confines of the municipal authority of Rome came to be fixed at the "centesimum lapidem" (i.e. one hundred miles) on each of the via consularis converging on Rome. So, de iure, the Roman municipal authority controlled the whole of Lazio and part of Tuscany from Talamone to Terracina and also parts of Abruzzo and Umbria.

The same territorial division was confirmed by the re-subdivision of the provinces by Diocletian.

=== Medieval era ===
After the fall of the empire, the praefectus urbi continued to be elected and did not come to be totally deprived of their power even by the advancing papal power which effectively became the municipal government of Rome.

The Ager Romanus, as a political zone subject to the municipium of Rome, theoretically continued to extend ad centesimum lapidem, but in practice many of its regions ended up in Lombard hands, with still others managed by the religious authorities or the pope, who were beginning to manage their territories by means of patrimonia and domuscultae.

=== Today ===
The motu proprio of 6 July 1817 by Pope Pius VII established the boundaries of the municipium of Rome, assigning to the capital its present communal territory as well as the present communes of Fiumicino, Pomezia and Ardea. The confines of the Comunità di Roma were thus finally defined and no longer nebulous, and these limits ended at the constitution of the commune of Pomezia (also including present-day Ardea) following its lasting foundation during the "bonifica fascista" and – in the 1990s – of Fiumicino.

== Border sanctuaries ==
Archaeologists such as Francesca Fulminante have attempted to calculate size of the ancient territory of Rome (the "ager Romanus antiquus") based on supposed border sanctuaries that may mark the boundaries of the archaic Roman land. The notion of sanctuary sites as territorial markers may connect to various rituals attested in Roman religion, although all proposals for possible frontier sanctuaries are contentious. One example of a border sanctuary may surface in the works of the 1st-century BCE poet Ovid, who describes in his Fasti a sacrifice occurring at a "sacred grove of ancient mildew" ("antiquae lucum Robiginis") on the road from Nomentum to Rome. Ziółkowski identifies this road with the Via Nomentana, although the classical scholar Theodor Mommsen suggests that Ovid was likely referencing his countryside gardens located by the fork between the Via Clodia and the Via Flaminia. Mommsen thus concludes that the sacrifice may have occurred near Milvian bridge, which is itself situated by the split in the roads. Based on this theory, German philologist Hermann Usener argued that the sanctuary could have been located near the fifth milestone on the Via Clodia. However, Ziółkowski disputes this analysis, denigrating the arguments of Mommsen as "preposterous." Strabo, a 1st-century BCE Greek geographer, mentions that a group of "ἱερομνήμονες" ("hieromnḗmones," "priests") performed a sacrifice at—among other places—an otherwise unknown town called "Festi" ("Φῆστοι," "Phéstoi") that was located on an older border of Roman territory. This ritual may connect to the Ambarvalia, a ritual of the Arval brotherhood performed at a sacred grove dedicated to Dea Dia. However, Ziółkowski rejects this comparison and, consequently, opposes the site's designation as a border sanctuary. Various other sites have also been identified as border sanctuaries: The two temples to Fors Fortuna located respectively at the first and sixth milestones along the Via Portuensis, and the "sixth boundary stone from [Laurentum]," where the local populace celebrated the Terminalia, a festival honoring Terminus—the god of borders; The sites are usually situated around five-to-six miles from Rome, a line of demarcation which possibly persisted, at least in the cultural consciousness, as a boundary for city territory until much later in Roman history. According to the 2nd-century CE Roman historian Appianus, the Roman politicians Marius and Sulpicius forbade general Sulla—during his march on Rome in 88 BCE—from establishing his camp within a distance of 40 stadi from the city of Rome, a distance equivalent to five Roman miles. The sanctuaries may have been established at territorial boundaries for the purpose of incurring divine help in the protection of the local land, which may also explain the tendency for the sites to propitiate deities associated with war and agriculture.

== Bibliography ==
- Eder, Walter (2006). "Ager Romanus". Brill's New Pauly. Brill.
- Fulminante, Francesca (2014). The Urbanisation of Rome and Latium Vetus: From the Bronze Age to the Archaic Era. Cambridge: Cambridge University Press. ISBN 978-1-107-03035-0.
- Platner, Samuel Ball (1929). Ashby, Thomas (ed.). A Topographical Dictionary of Ancient Rome. Cambridge University Press. ISBN 978-1-108-08324-9.
- Ziółkowski, Adam (2009). "FRONTIER SANCTUARIES OF THE AGER ROMANUS ANTIQUUS: DID THEY EXIST?". Palamedes: A Journal of Ancient History (4): 91–130. ISSN 1896-8244.
