= Autostrada A90 =

Controlled-access highway in Italy

Autostrada A90
- Grande Raccordo Anulare; Great ring junction

Route information
- Part of E80
- Maintained by ANAS
- Length: 68.2 km (42.4 mi)
- Existed: 1951–present

Major junctions
- Beltway around Rome
- From: Rome
- A1 in Rome; A24 in Rome; A91 in Rome
- To: Rome

Location
- Country: Italy
- Regions: Lazio

Highway system
- Roads in Italy; Autostrade; State; Regional; Provincial; Municipal
← A 60	→ A 91

Map of the Grande Raccordo Anulare

Autostrada A90 or Grande Raccordo Anulare (lit. 'Great ring junction') or GRA is a ring-shaped autostrada (Italian for "motorway") 68.2 kilometres (42.4 mi) long in Italy located in the region of Lazio that encircles central Rome. It is a part of the E80 European route. The A90 is one of the most important roads in Rome, and traffic reaches 160,000 vehicles per day as of 2011.

The A90 features 14 tunnels, with lengths varying from the 66 meters of Parco di Veio II tunnel to the 1,150 m (3,770 ft) meters of the Appia Antica tunnel as well as eight rest areas. It has 42 junctions, with the Via Aurelia numbered 1 and the rest following clockwise.

The motorway has always been toll-free. However, there are plans to introduce a fee for vehicles entering the A90 from highways. Maintenance costs are around €11 million per year.

Its acronym was given after one of its main designers and supporters, Eugenio Gra, chairman of Anas, the Italian roads Authority, at the time of construction. The official number among the Italian motorways is Autostrada A90, but is widely known by Romans as Il Raccordo (lit. 'The Junction').

== History ==
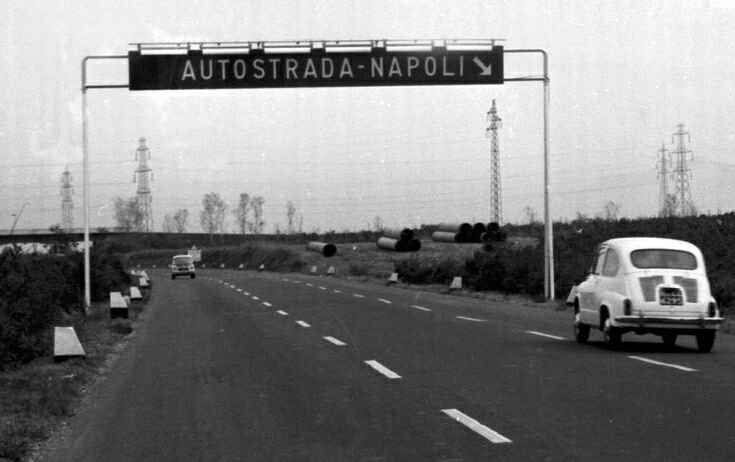
Grande Raccordo Anulare in the 1950s

Plans for an orbital road around what, at the time, was considered to be the entire city of Rome were proposed by the end of World War II. One of the designers' main purposes was to build the road as most equally distant as possible from the geographic centre of town, the Campidoglio, 11.4 kilometres (7.1 mi) away from the motorway.

Construction works started in 1948. The first section, Flaminia to Tiburtina (north-to-east section) opened in 1952, later extended in stages. The last section to be opened was the west-to-north section (Aurelia to Flaminia), in 1970.

Although the A90 was initially planned and built as a single-carriageway road, it was soon clear that traffic was rapidly growing well beyond the expectations. Construction works to motorway standards started in late 1950s with first dual-carriageway, four-lane section (Salaria to Tuscolana) opened 1962. Further works were carried over throughout the 1970s, and by 1979, the remainder sections were widened to four-lane and the entire ring classified as toll-free highway.

Widening works to 6-lane started in 1983 and were completed in stages throughout the 1990s and 2000s. As of April 2008 97% of the A90 was 6-lane with final sections (new tunnel under Via Cassia) opened 2011.

Over the years the city of Rome has expanded well beyond the A90, especially in the direction of neighborhoods such as Ostia, Olgiata, Borghesiana and Albano Laziale where Rome's built-up urban "tentacles" will reach up to about 15 kilometers in length from the ringroad outward.

=== Timeline ===
- 1948: Building works began.
- 1951: The Appia-Aurelia section is opened.
- 1952: The Flaminia-Tiburtina section is opened.
- 1955: The Tiburtina-Appia section is opened.
- 1960: The road was part of the marathon course of the 1960 Summer Olympics.
- 1962: The lane number is doubled in Salaria-Tuscolana section
- 1970: The Aurelia-Flaminia section is opened, the ring is completed.
- 1979: The A90 is now officially a highway.
- 1983: Works to a 6-lane set begin.
- 1997: 50% of the A90 track is on a 6-lane (2x3) set
- 2000: 75% of the A90 track is on a 6-lane set
- 2007: 97% of the A90 track is on a 6-lane set
- 2011: End of works to the 6-lane set

== Future expansion ==
It has been suggested that a second ring might be constructed in the future, firstly as an attempt to alleviate congestion on the old one and secondly to offer access to a number of new industrial, commercial and residential zones built around it. Such a project would imply a new external ring-shaped orbital motorway of about 120 kilometres (75 mi), denominated NIA (Nuova infrastruttura anulare, "New ring infrastructure"), which would cost over €5 billion.

== In popular culture ==
The road was the subject of the 2013 documentary film Sacro GRA which won the Golden Lion at the 70th Venice International Film Festival.

== Trivia ==
Although the name GRA officially stands for Grande Raccordo Anulare ("Great Ring Junction"), the name was actually coined in order to make its acronym be the name of the head of the project, engineer Eugenio Gra.

== Route ==
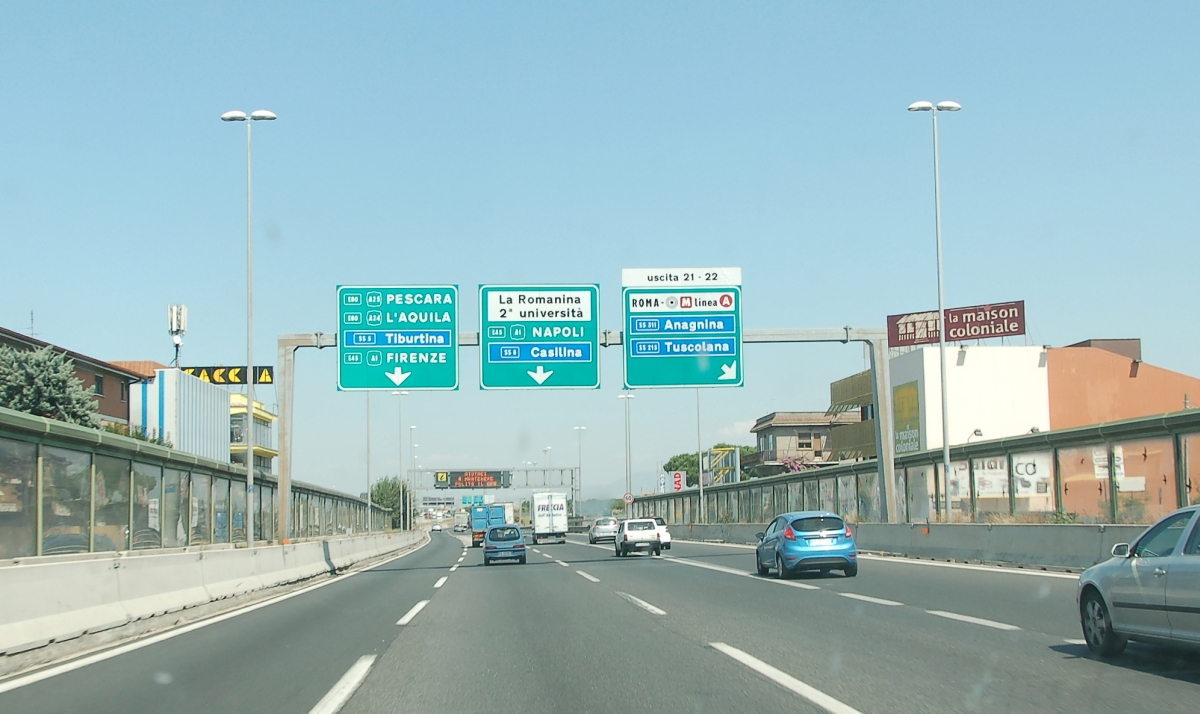
Grande Raccordo Anulare near Fiumicino exit

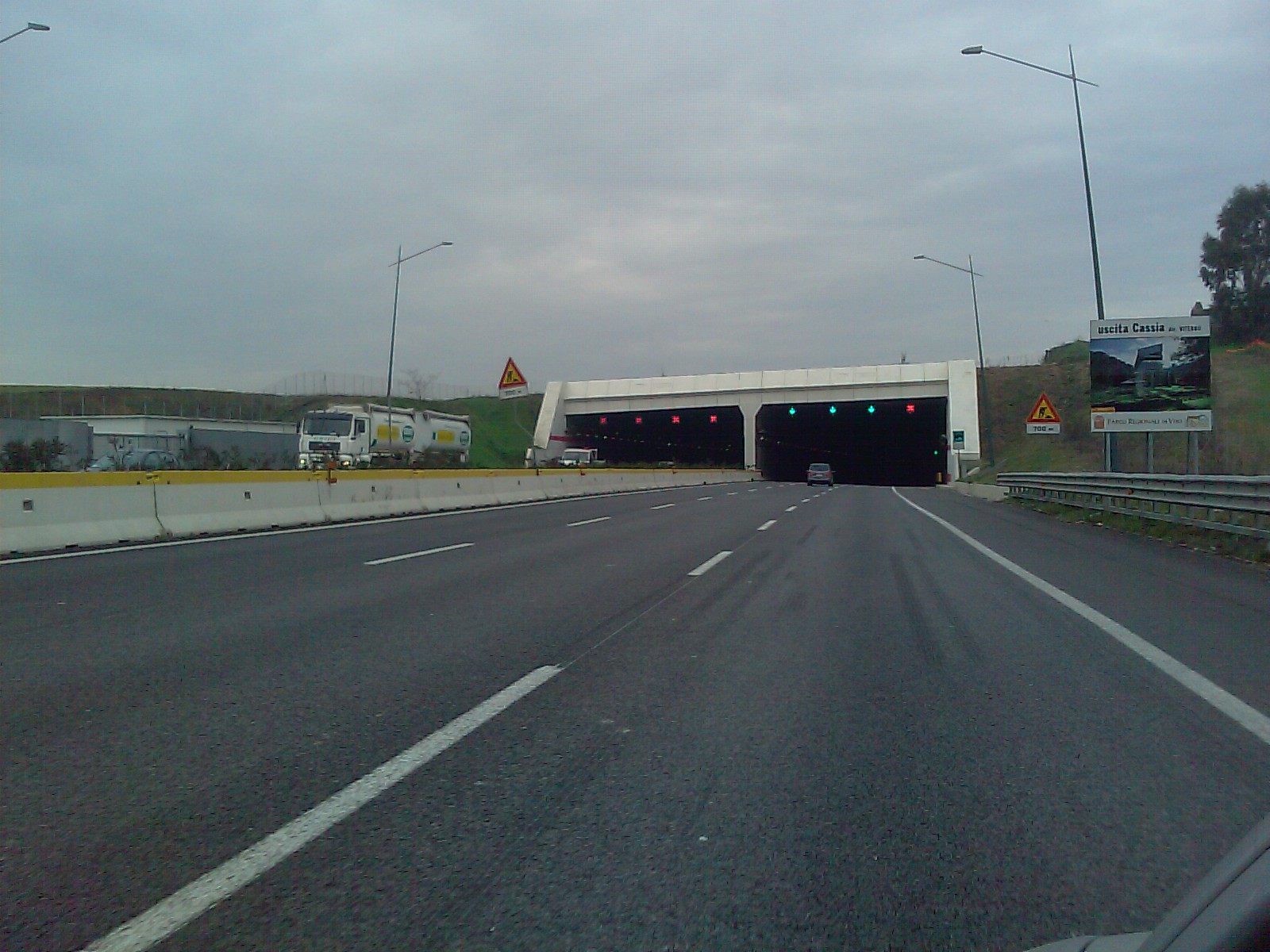
Grande Raccordo Anulare near Isola Farnese

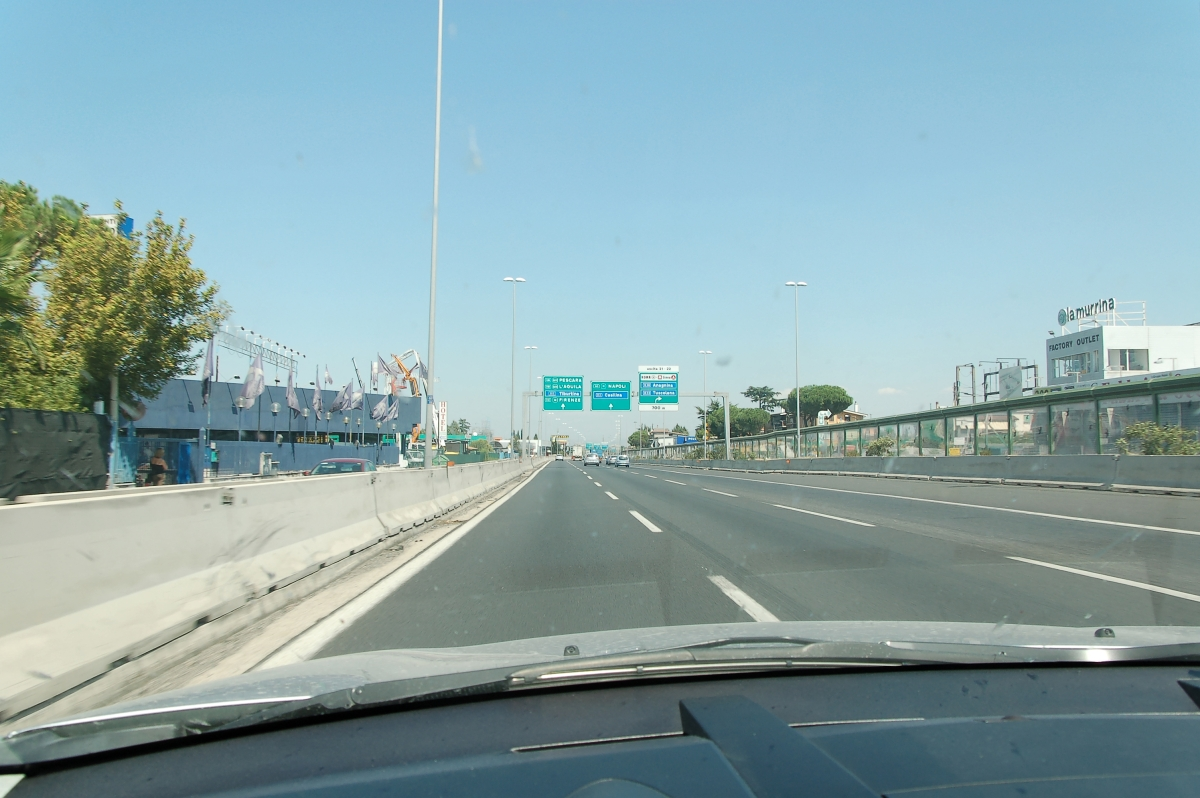
Grande Raccordo Anulare near Via Anagnina exit

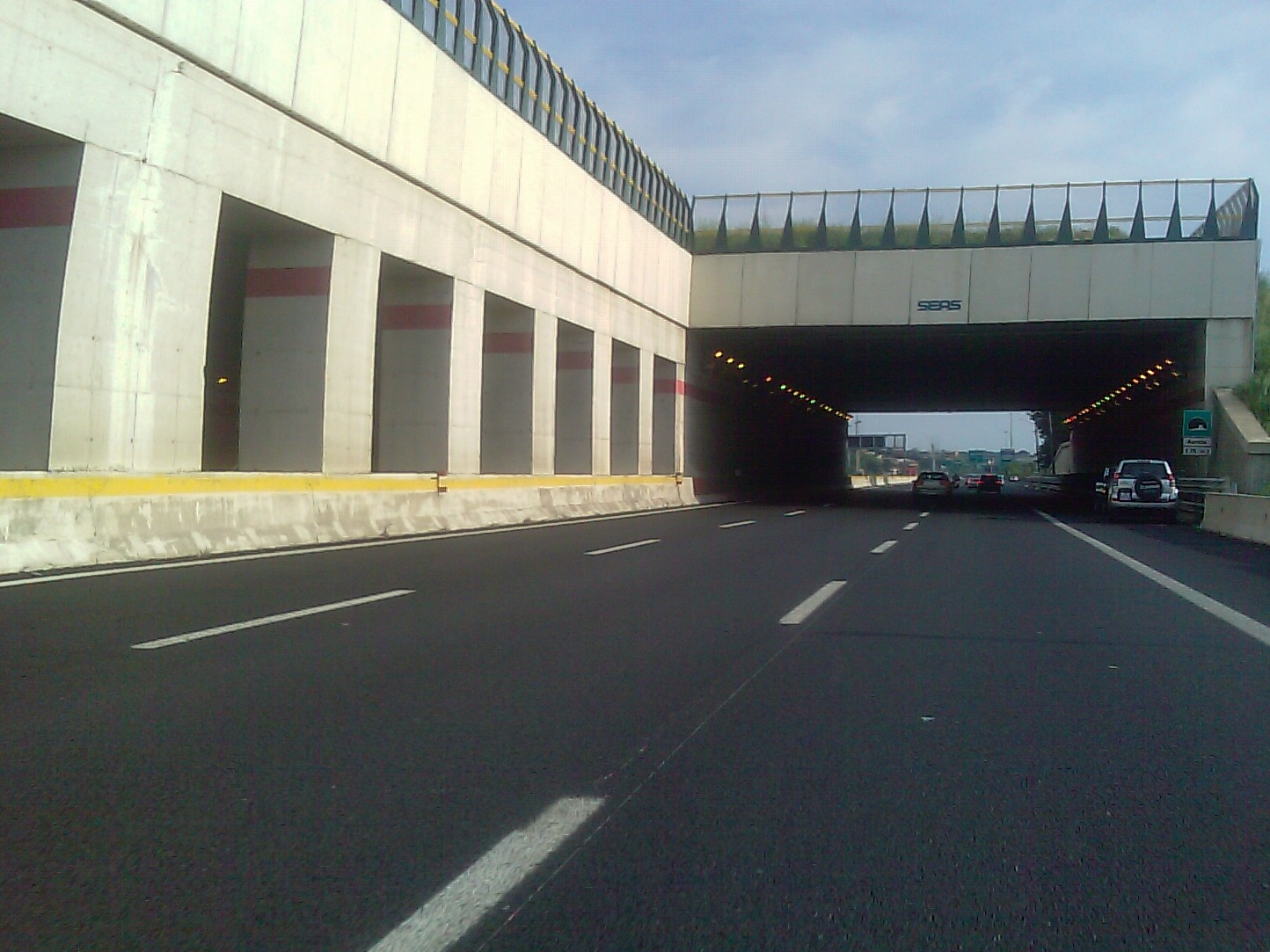
Grande Raccordo Anulare near Strada statale 1 Via Aurelia exit

GRANDE RACCORDO ANULARE; Autostrada A90
Exit	↓km↓	↑km↑	Province	European Route
Via Aurelia; Aurelio; Vatican City; Ladispoli; Civitavecchia; Port of Civitavecchia	0.0 km (0 mi)	68.2 km (42.4 mi)	RM	--
Montespaccato	2.3 km (1.4 mi)	65.9 km (40.9 mi)	RM	--
Via della Maglianella - Via di Boccea; Montespaccato; Via della Maglianella	2.6 km (1.6 mi)	65.6 km (40.8 mi)	RM	--
Via di Boccea; Primavalle; Casalotti	3.4 km (2.1 mi)	64.8 km (40.3 mi)	RM	--
Via di Casal del Marmo; Via di Selva Candida; Palmarola; Primavalle; Casalotti; Selva Candida	4.4 km (2.7 mi)	60.6 km (37.7 mi)	RM	--
Rest area "Selva Candida"	8.6 km (5.3 mi)	59.6 km (37.0 mi)	RM	--
Via Trionfale; Ipogeo degli Ottavi; Ottavia; Primavalle; San Filippo Neri Hospital; La Giustiniana; Lake Bracciano; Viterbo	10.0 km (6.2 mi)	58.2 km (36.2 mi)	RM	--
Via Cassia; Tomba di Nerone; Corso Francia; La Giustiniana; Lake Bracciano; Viterbo	12.2 km (7.6 mi)	56.0 km (34.8 mi)	RM	--
Sant'Andrea Hospital; Via di Grottarossa	17.3 km (10.7 mi)	50.7 km (31.5 mi)	RM	--
Via Cassia Veientana; Viterbo	17.5 km (10.9 mi)	50.9 km (31.6 mi)	RM	--
Labaro; Labaro	17.8 km (11.1 mi)	51.2 km (31.8 mi)	RM	--
Via Flaminia Saxa Rubra; RAI radio and television centre Stadio Olimpico; Flaminio; Cimitero Flaminio; Prima Porta; Terni; Fano; Perugia	18.1 km (11.2 mi)	50.1 km (31.1 mi)	RM	--
Castel Giubileo; Via di Castel Giubileo; Labaro	18.8 km (11.7 mi)	49.4 km (30.7 mi)	RM	--
Via Salaria; Salario; Rome Urbe Airport; Rieti; Monte Terminillo; Ascoli Piceno	20.0 km (12.4 mi)	48.2 km (30.0 mi)	RM	--
Via di Settebagni; Colle Salario; Fidene; Settebagni; Bel Poggio	20.7 km (12.9 mi)	47.5 km (29.5 mi)	RM	--
GRA-Fiano Romano; Firenze	21.0 km (13.0 mi)	47.2 km (29.3 mi)	RM	--
Via della Bufalotta; Via delle Vigne Nuove; Monte Sacro Alto	22.3 km (13.9 mi)	45.9 km (28.5 mi)	RM	--
Rest area "Settebagni"	23.3 km (14.5 mi)	44.9 km (27.9 mi)	RM	--
Via Nomentana; Talenti; Monte Sacro; Mentana; Monterotondo; Palombara Sabina; Fonte Nuova	26.6 km (16.5 mi)	41.6 km (25.8 mi)	RM	--
Centrale del Latte; Torraccia; San Basilio; Via di Sant'Alessandro; Casal Monastero	28.3 km (17.6 mi)	39.9 km (24.8 mi)	RM	--
Via Tiburtina; Ponte Mammolo; Policlinico Umberto I Settecamini; Tivoli	29.9 km (18.6 mi)	38.3 km (23.8 mi)	RM	--
L'Aquila - Teramo; Tangenziale Est; Firenze-Napoli; Pescara	31.5 km (19.6 mi)	36.7 km (22.8 mi)	RM	E80
La Rustica; La Rustica; Tor Sapienza	32.8 km (20.4 mi)	35.4 km (22.0 mi)	RM	E80
Uffici Finanziari; Via Capranesi; Via Boglione	34.0 km (21.1 mi)	34.2 km (21.3 mi)	RM	E80
Via Prenestina; Centocelle; Prenestino; Villaggio Falcone; Palestrina	34.6 km (21.5 mi)	33.6 km (20.9 mi)	RM	E80
Tor Bella Monaca; Torre Angela	35.0 km (21.7 mi)	31.2 km (19.4 mi)	RM	E80
Via Prenestina bis Centocelle; Prenestino	36.0 km (22.4 mi)	30.2 km (18.8 mi)	RM	E80
Rest area "Casilina"	37.5 km (23.3 mi)	30.3 km (18.8 mi)	RM	E80
Via Casilina; Giardinetti; Torre Maura; Casilino; Torre Angela; Frosinone; Cassino	38.0 km (23.6 mi)	30.2 km (18.8 mi)	RM	E80
GRA-San Cesareo; Napoli	39.3 km (24.4 mi)	28.9 km (18.0 mi)	RM	E80
La Romanina; University of Rome Tor Vergata; Torrenova	39.9 km (24.8 mi)	28.3 km (17.6 mi)	RM	E80
Via Tuscolana; Cinecittà; Tuscolano; Frascati	40.9 km (25.4 mi)	27.3 km (17.0 mi)	RM	E80
Via Anagnina; Cinecittà; Tuscolano; Osteria del Curato; Gregna Sant'Andrea; Casal Morena; Grottaferrata	41.6 km (25.8 mi)	26.6 km (16.5 mi)	RM	E80
Gregna Sant'Andrea; Ciampino	43.2 km (26.8 mi)	43.2 km (26.8 mi)	RM	E80
Via Appia; Appio; San Giovanni; Rome Ciampino Airport; Cisterna di Latina Velletri	44.4 km (27.6 mi)	23.8 km (14.8 mi)	RM	E80
Via Ardeatina; Ardeatino; EUR; Divino Amore; Santa Palomba; Ardea	48.0 km (29.8 mi)	20.2 km (12.6 mi)	RM	E80
Rest area "Ardeatina"	51.0 km (31.7 mi)	17.2 km (10.7 mi)	RM	E80
Via Laurentina; Laurentina; Università Campus Bio-Medico; Trigoria; Ardea	52.6 km (32.7 mi)	15.6 km (9.7 mi)	RM	E80
Via Pontina; EUR; Sant'Eugenio Hospital; Palazzo dello sport Pomezia; Aprilia; Anzio; Latina; Terracina	54.8 km (34.1 mi)	13.4 km (8.3 mi)	RM	E80
Via Cristoforo Colombo; Casal Palocco; Lido di Ostia	55.3 km (34.4 mi)	12.9 km (8.0 mi)	RM	E80
Via del Mare; Via Ostiense; Ostiense; Basilica of Saint Paul Outside the Walls; Acilia; Ostia Antica; Lido di Ostia	57.8 km (35.9 mi)	10.4 km (6.5 mi)	RM	E80
Parco de' Medici; Viale Parco de' Medici	59.9 km (37.2 mi)	8.3 km (5.2 mi)	RM	E80
Fiumicino; EUR; Magliana; Fiera di Roma; Civitavecchia; Port of Civitavecchia; Leonardo Express; Rome Fiumicino Airport	60.6 km (37.7 mi)	7.6 km (4.7 mi)	RM	E80
Via della Magliana; Trullo; Magliana; Via Portuense; Fiumicino; Port of Fiumicino; Leonardo Express; Rome Fiumicino Airport	61.1 km (38.0 mi)	7.1 km (4.4 mi)	RM	--
Centro direzionale Via Marchetti	62.1 km (38.6 mi)	6.1 km (3.8 mi)	RM	--
Via della Pisana; Gianicolense; Portuense; Ponte Galeria	64.5 km (40.1 mi)	3.7 km (2.3 mi)	RM	--
Rest area "Pisana"	66.1 km (41.1 mi)	2.1 km (1.3 mi)	RM	--
Via di Casal Lumbroso; Via del Pescaccio; Casal Lumbroso	66.5 km (41.3 mi)	1.7 km (1.1 mi)	RM	--
Via Aurelia; Aurelio; Vatican City; Ladispoli; Civitavecchia; Port of Civitavecchia	68.2 km (42.4 mi)	0.0 km (0 mi)	RM	--

== See also ==
- Autostrade of Italy
- Roads in Italy
- Transport in Italy

=== Other Italian roads ===
- State highways (Italy)
- Regional road (Italy)
- Provincial road (Italy)
- Municipal road (Italy)

== Bibliography ==
- Marco Pietrolucci. La città del Grande Raccordo Anulare. Gangemi Editore, 2012. ISBN 88-492-2076-6
