= Maurizio Giugliano =

Italian serial killer (1962–1994)

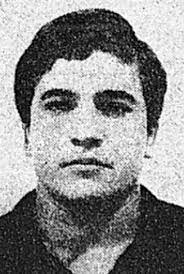
- Mugshot of Giugliano
- Born: 7 June 1962; Acciarella, Latina, Italy
- Died: 1994 (aged 31); Reggio Emilia, Italy
- Other name: "The Wolf of Ager Romanus"
- Convictions: Murder; Arson; Sexual assault Robbery; Theft
- Penalty: 17 years and 8 months (Meschi); Acquittal by reason of insanity (Stroppa)

Details
- Victims: 3–8
- Span of crimes: 1983 – 1984; 1993
- Country: Italy
- State: Lazio
- Date apprehended: For the final time in February 1984

Maurizio Giugliano (7 June 1962 – 1994), known as The Wolf of Ager Romanus (Italian: Il Lupo dell'Agro Romano), was an Italian serial killer who killed between two and seven women in Rome and the surrounding area from 1983 to 1984. He later murdered a fellow inmate at a mental hospital in 1993. For these crimes, he was sentenced to life imprisonment and remained imprisoned until his death in 1994.

== Early life ==
Maurizio Giugliano was born in the hamlet of Acciarella, Latina, on 7 June 1962, the second of four children of cow herders. He suffered from malnutrition since birth, which may have caused his inability to speak until age four. In 1970, he was accidentally hit by a motorcycle driven by carabinieri, and from then on he became more unstable and aggressive. Over the years, Giugliano had repeated outbursts against his father, siblings, and classmates, even going so far as to kill animals on the family farm. He was detained in several psychiatric hospitals for this, but always managed to escape.

In the 1970s, the family frequently changed residences before eventually settling in Rome. In 1977, Giugliano was arrested for robbery and served a short prison term at the Casal del Marmo juvenile prison. Two years later, he was arrested for sexually assaulting an acquaintance. He was ordered to undergo a psychiatric evaluation, which concluded that he had a personality disorder aggravated by his upbringing. While awaiting sentencing, he was imprisoned at the Aversa Judicial Psychiatric Hospital, and once convicted and sentenced to two years imprisonment, he was transferred to the Pianosa Prison.

After his release, Giugliano moved around the outskirts of Rome in his caravan. He then married Rosa Bussaglia, whom he had met as a teenager, and had a daughter with her, with the trio living in his caravan. In February 1984, following a violent argument with his mother-in-law, Giugliano set fire to the Bussaglias' apartment and was arrested for arson. While in jail, he was accused of a series of murders that had recently plagued the capital and the surrounding area.

== Murders ==
Between July 1983 and January 1984, six women were murdered in the Ager Romanus and the Pontine Marshes, all of which were initially attributed to Giugliano. The victims were the following:

- Thea "Tiziana" Stroppa (51) - prostitute; found dead on 6 July 1983, between Flaminia Vecchia and Due Ponti. She had been strangled with her blouse, hit in the face with a stone and finished off with a gunshot. Her half-naked body had been hastily covered with rubble.
- Luciana "Silvana" Lupi (45) - prostitute; found dead on 9 July in Passo Corese. She was murdered between 4 and 5 July, having been strangled with her belt. Her killer disfigured her body post-mortem by repeatedly hitting it with stones.
- Lucia "Margherita" Rosa (33) - prostitute and drug addict from Catania who was known to local police; found dead on 13 July in Tor de' Cenci; she had been dead for approximately five days. As with previous victims, she had been strangled with her own clothing.
- Giulia Meschi (31) - former municipal employee; found murdered on 5 August in Sabaudia, near a cornfield. One witness told investigators that he had seen the killer and later provided a description of him.
- Fernanda Renzetti Durante (53) - painter and the wife of a Bank of Italy official; her half-naked body was found on a country road near Pratica di Mare on 31 October. Her car, a red Fiat 500, was found the next day near Campoleone Station, with her clothes left inside. A knife found next to the body was determined to be the murder weapon.
- Catherine "Katty" Skerl (17) - daughter of stateless film director Peter Skerl; found dead on 22 January 1984, in a vineyard in Grottaferrata. She had been strangled with a wire and the strap of a duffel bag. Unlike other victims, the girl was still clothed. A witness claimed to have seen her get onto a stranger's Vespa the day prior.

== Investigation ==
After the sixth murder, the commissioner of the Prenestino neighbourhood, Rocco Marazzita, sent a report to the head of the homicide squad, Nicola Cavaliere, in which he pointed out Giugliano's previous convictions. The evidence against him was weak: a caravan similar to his was seen near each murder site; the cars used for the murders were purchased under false names (as Giugliano did), and Giugliano travelled around on a Vespa.

Giugliano's wife, mother and mother-in-law were interviewed several times by investigators and described his personality in detail. According to his wife, Giugliano would implicate himself in the murders during domestic disputes, while his mother informed the authorities about her son's suspicious behaviour as early as October 1983.

When queried about the new suspect, the witness to the Meschi murder immediately recognized him as the killer. However, investigators struggled to link him to the other five murders, leading some newspapers to question his guilt. Some commentators also pointed out that in the 1980s, before and after Giugliano's arrest, similar murders occurred in and around Rome, which remain unsolved to this day.

== Trial, imprisonment, and death ==
Giugliano was eventually remanded for three of the six murders: those of Stroppa, Rosa and Meschi. During the trial for the Stroppa murder, it was ruled that he was of unsound mind and thus acquitted by reason of insanity. For the Rosa trial, Giugliano himself confessed to the murder but later retracted his confession. As witnesses were unable to conclusively confirm that he was the man seen walking away with her, he was acquitted of her murder as well.

When put on trial for the Meschi murder in 1986, he was successfully convicted and sentenced to 17 years and 8 months imprisonment, largely thanks to the witness testimony of the man who had seen him walking away from the crime scene. The psychiatric interviews performed during the three trials produced very different outcomes, causing confusion over Giugliano's mental state. He was never charged with the murders of Lupi, Durante and Skerl, which, coupled with his acquittal in the Rosa case, remain unsolved.

Once incarcerated in Rebibbia, Giugliano shared a cell with Agostino Panetta, leader of the 'Clockwork Orange Gang' who had been imprisoned for robbery. Giugliano supposedly confided to him that he was responsible for the murders of Rosa and Maria Negri, who was killed inside her home in Cavallino on 3 August 1983. In his account, he was reportedly in Veneto for a summer vacation with his wife and brother-in-law, and while pumping gas, he noticed Negri. Feeling the urge to kill, he made up an excuse to his relatives and drove to the woman's house, where he strangled her with an electric wire. He then hurried back to his car and returned.

When questioned by the authorities, Giugliano claimed he had never confessed to any such murder, and was thus acquitted due to insufficient evidence. His confession for the Rosa murder was also retracted; moreover, some inconsistencies were noted in Panetta's retelling when compared with how the body was located. As a result, Giugliano was acquitted of the crime yet again.

For the remainder of his incarceration, Giugliano gained notoriety for his violent behaviour. On 27 October 1988, when put on trial for theft and robbery committed in 1982, he threw handcuffs at the court. In November 1989, during the trial for the Rosa murder, he hurled a chair at the judges and threatened to kill them. In 1990, he was admitted to the Montelupo Fiorentino Judicial Psychiatric Hospital, where he remained for three years until he was ordered to be transferred - the reason for this was that he suffocated a fellow inmate with a pillow when he refused to give him a cigarette. From there, Giugliano was transferred to a hospital in Reggio Emilia, where he died the following year of a heart attack.

== See also ==
- List of serial killers by country

== Bibliography ==
- Aldo Musci, Marco Minicangeli (2000). Mala Roma: guida al lato oscuro della città eterna [Mala Roma: guide to the dark side of the Eternal City] (in Italian). Castelvecchi. pp. 72–75. ISBN 8882102114.
- Gordiano Lupi (2005). Serial killer italiani. Cento anni di casi agghiaccianti da Vincenzo Verzeni a Donato Bilancia [Italian serial killers. One hundred years of chilling cases from Vincenzo Verzeni to Donato Bilancia] (in Italian). Olimpia. pp. 193–196. ISBN 9788825300918.
- Otello Lupacchini, Max Parisi (2006). Dodici donne un solo assassino [Twelve women, one murderer] (in Italian). Koiné Nuove Edizioni. ISBN 8887509719.
- Ruben De Luca, Vincenzo Maria Mastronardi (2013). I serial killer [Serial killers] (in Italian). Newton Compton Editori. ISBN 9788854162167.
