= Sacco Pastore =

Quartiere of Rome in Lazio, Italy

Sacco Pastore/Saccopastore
- Quartiere of Rome
- Sacco Pastore
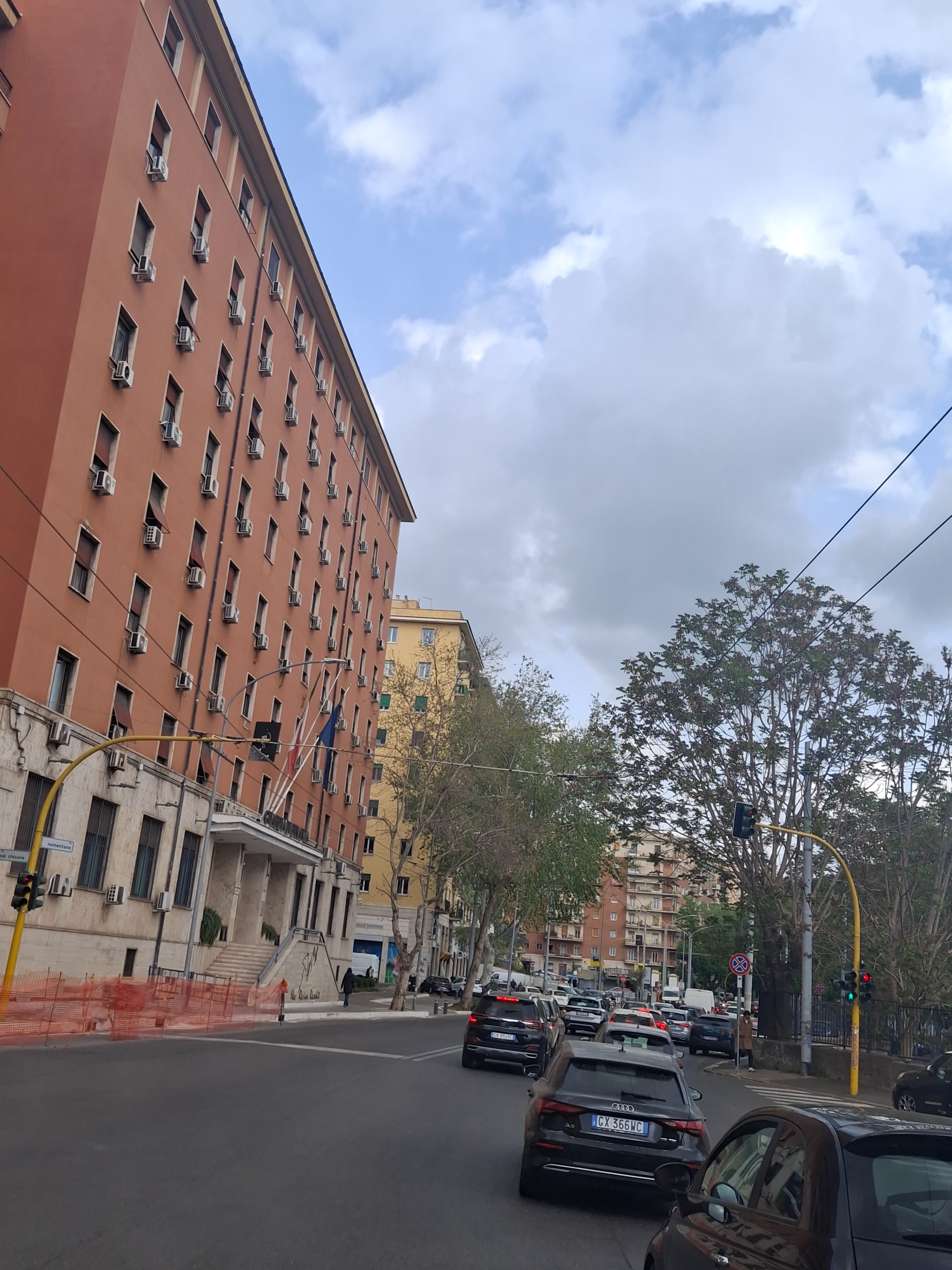
- Image showcasing Via Nomentana in Sacco Pastore

- The map showcases the location of the quarter (4H) in Rome
- Country: Italy
- Region: Lazio
- Province: Rome
- First settled: At least 100,000 years ago
- Formal establishment: 1930s

Population (2017)
  - Total: 10,312
  - Density: 56.87/sq mi (21.957/km^{2})

Sacco Pastore is the urban zone "4h" of the Municipio III of the Metropolitan city of Rome. It borders the quarter of Trieste, Pietralata, Nomentano and the Monte Sacro. It is part of the historic area of Monte Sacro alongside various other quarters in the area.

It is mostly known due to the fact that within the Pleistocene deposits in the area two Neanderthal skulls in 1929 and 1935 have been found, known as Saccopastore skulls.

== History ==
=== Prehistory ===
The area of Sacco Pastore seems to have been inhabited by Neanderthals at the very least 100.000–250.000 years ago. The area's fauna was also significantly different, with hippopotamus, rhinoceros and elephants roaming around. The area also had gravel and sand deposits sedimentation cycles linked to glaciations formed over the ages due to the local alluvial terraces of the Aniene river.

=== Antiquity ===
Between the 2nd and early 1st century BC the construction of Ponte Nomentano was finalized at the very border of the quarter today.

=== Middle Ages ===
The East Roman historian Procopius records that the Ponte Nomentano was destroyed by the Ostrogoths under their king Totila around 547 AD during the Gothic War and was later rebuilt in 552 by Narses.

=== Modern era ===
Joseph Wright of Derby visited the area of the quarter in the 1770s and painted a painting of the Ponte Nomentano.

=== Contemporary era ===
==== Post-unification period ====
Giuseppe Garibaldi passed through what would later become the quarter and stayed in a tavern at the local "Station of Posta Pontificia" (built by the Papal States as a postal station), which was later named after himself.

==== Fascist period ====
In the 1920s a gravel excavation cave was active and managed by Duke Mario Grazioli as part of his family's estate.

In April 1929, quarry workers near the Aniene River uncovered a human skull that appeared to be fossilized. The cranium was promptly sent to Sergio Sergi, who initiated an extensive study of the specimen. Known as the Saccopastore skull, it was identified as belonging to an adult female. The skull is nearly complete and shows significant mineralization, although it is missing the zygomatic arches and the lower jaw. During the excavation, the workers accidentally caused damage, breaking and losing several dental crowns, damaging the area above the eyes, and puncturing two holes in the frontal and parietal regions of the skull. In the summer of 1935, A.C. Blanc and H. Breuil uncovered a second, less complete skull in the same location where the first Saccopastore cranium had been found in 1929. This second skull belonged to a male and is missing the entire cranial vault, the left frontal orbital area, and part of the base. Differences in morphology between the two skulls are attributed to sexual dimorphism, with one being a mature female and the other a young adult male. The cranial capacity of the male skull is estimated between 1,280 and 1,300 milliliters. Its facial structure is smaller than that of a Wurmian Neandertal, but larger than the first Saccopastore skull.

The quarter in its current urban form was established and started to be developed in the same period as the discovery, in the 1930s during the fascist period. In the 1930s there was some will to slow down the urbanization of the area to preserve hypothetical further archeological findings, however, starting in the 1940s the need for urbanization prevailed and extensive land reclamation work occurred. One of the first signs of urbanization was the construction of Via di Sacco Pastore, one of the main roads in the quarter, in 1937.

I Caimani del Bell'orizzonte's headquarter, a youth-led Italian resistance group, was located on the opposite side of the Aniene river in front of Sacco Pastore. The partisans also operated in the area during the Italian Civil War.

==== Cold War period ====
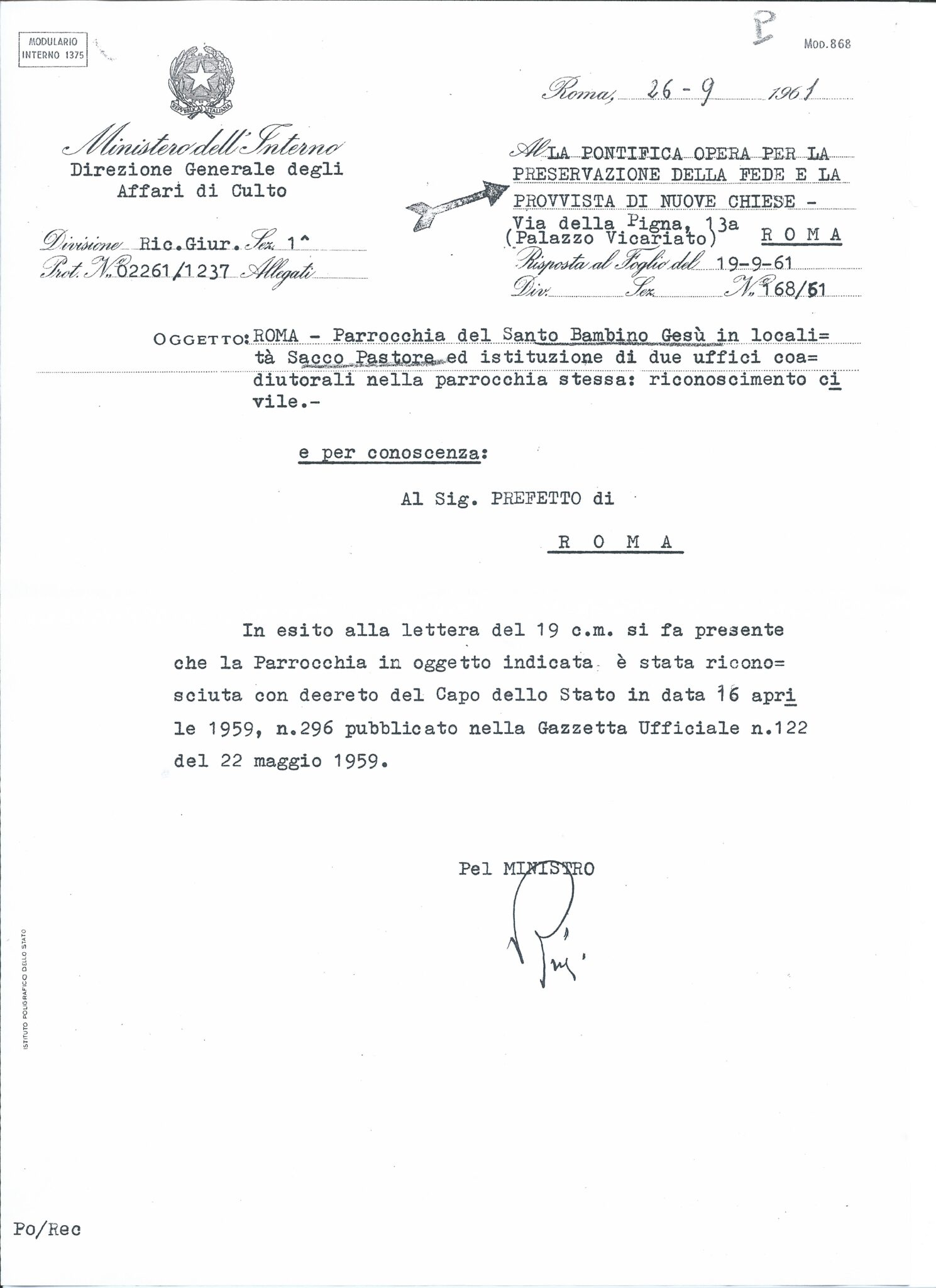
Communication of the civil recognition of the parish

During this early development era the chapel of Via Val di Fiemme was inaugurated on 24 December 1952, later named Chiesa di Gesù Bambino a Sacco Pastore. On 30 March 1957, Cardinal Clemente Micara, Vicar of His Holiness Pope Pius XII for the Diocese of Rome issued the decree "Quo facilius", elevating the chapel to the status of Parish and dedicating it to the "Holy Child Jesus" . The parish, in the decree, was given pretty specific borders, including: "River Aniene from Ponte Tazio, towards the mouth up to the Fosso di S. Agnese, follow said Fosso to the Rome-Orte railway, including all the illegal houses that arise around said Fosso, between the railway and the river, follow said railway on the left up to the beginning of the hamlet of Vigna Mangani (in Pietralata), follow the boundary of said hamlet on the left and crossing the adjacent Via di Pietralata, you reach the river Aniene, left up to the aforementioned Tazio Bridge". The first parish was nominated to be Don Giuseppe Simonazzi.

==== Recent history ====
The founding of the Roma Nomentana railway station on 25 November 1983, which connects the area to the rest of the city and Rome Fiumicino Airport, has become important to the quarter. The Metro B1 has changed various ATAC SpA routes, which some of the residents blame for the area's presence of traffic jams and transportation problems. Discontent in the area is also tied to the still incomplete project of a modern bridge over the Aniene river in the area, which was promised to the local community in the 2000s.

In May 2001, a building next to the Provincial Headquarters of the Guardia di Finanza in Rome, located on Via Generale Roberto Bencivenga, was occupied by revolutionary anarchists. The building was later referred to as "Occupied Bencinvenga" or "Bencinvenga 15". Italian authorities reported that the building hosted members of the Informal Anarchist Federation, described as an anarcho‑insurrectionist network involved in violent direct action and connected to bombings and other attacks, and courts have charged affiliated individuals with terrorism‑related offences under Italian law.

In 2007 the "Tavern of Garibaldi" and the wider monumental area of "Station of Posta Pontificia" was mostly demolished and repurposed as a parking lot for the Guardia di Finanza, despite the protests by locals. Now some of the areas are also used as the headquarter of the "La Maggiolina" cultural center. The area became increasingly deprecated, with requests of restoring the former station and renovating the area continuing into at least the 2010s.

Xabier Gonzalez Sola, associated with the anarchist group Collettivo Bandiera Nera and subject to an EU arrest warrant, was arrested at the building. According to investigators, an anarcho-insurrectionist cell based at Bencinvenga was implicated in a 7 December 2017, attack on a Carabinieri station in San Giovanni, claimed by the Spanish anarchist group Cellula Santiago Maldonado. Members of the building were also allegedly involved in a series of arson attacks against the Eni Enjoy car-sharing service beginning in 2017, leading to an arrest on 28 February 2019. In 2020, seven individuals were arrested in connection with an operation called "Operation Bialystok".

As of today, the quarter's only notable meeting point is the "La Maggiolina" cultural center.

== Demographics ==
The population of the quarter back in 2017 was recorded to be 10,312 with a population density of 21.957,5 and an elderly index of 193,6.

== In Pop Culture ==
=== Movies ===
Movies shooting in the quarter or featuring it in some shape and form include:

- Big Deal on Madonna Street
- Lipstick
- Angelina

== Monuments ==
- Ponte Nomentano.
- Commemorative plaque of Rino Gaetano, in the place where he lived up until his death.
- Church of the Child Jesus in Sacco Pastore.
- Former "Station of Posta Pontificia" and "Tavern of Garibaldi".
