= San Mattia, Rome =

Church in Rome, Italy

Coordinates: 41°56′46.7″N 12°33′08.5″E

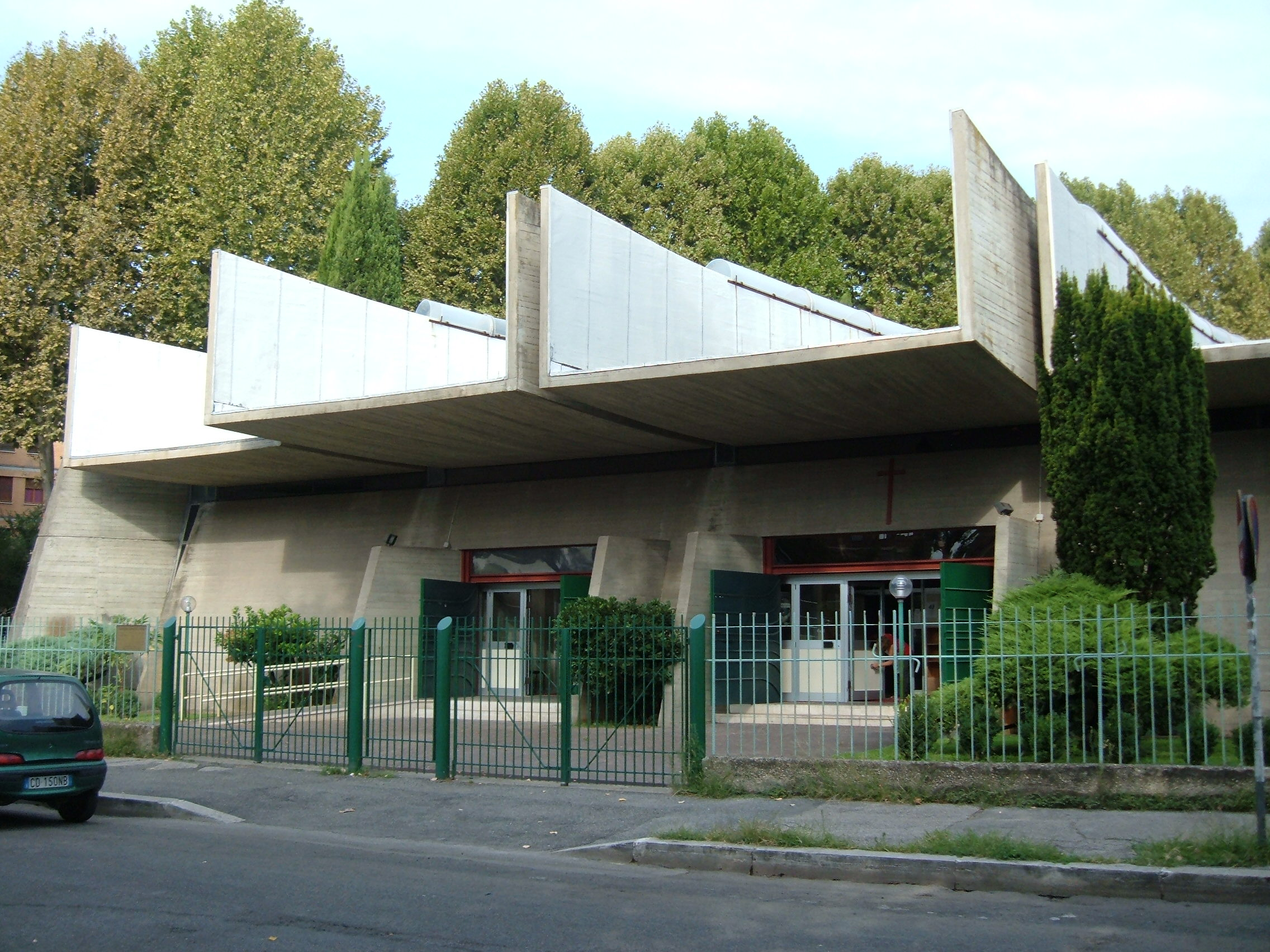
Exterior

San Mattia is a Roman Catholic parish church in Rome dedicated to saint Matthias. Designed by Ignazio Breccia, it is located on via Corrado Alvaro in the Monte Sacro Alto quarter. It has a marble altar, an olive-shaped sanctuary, a square overall plan and a 'sampietrini' floor made of cubes of porphyry. Seven grooves in the ceiling, converging on the presbytery, symbolise the seven sacraments.

== History ==
Its parish was established by decree of cardinal vicar Clemente Micara "Paulus Div. Prov. Papa VI" on 18 June 1964, but it first stone was only laid on 11 May 1968. It was opened on 22 November 1969 by monsignor Ugo Poletti, who also consecrated it on 16 December 1978.
