= San Basilio (Rome) =

Q. XXX San Basilio
- Quartiere of Rome
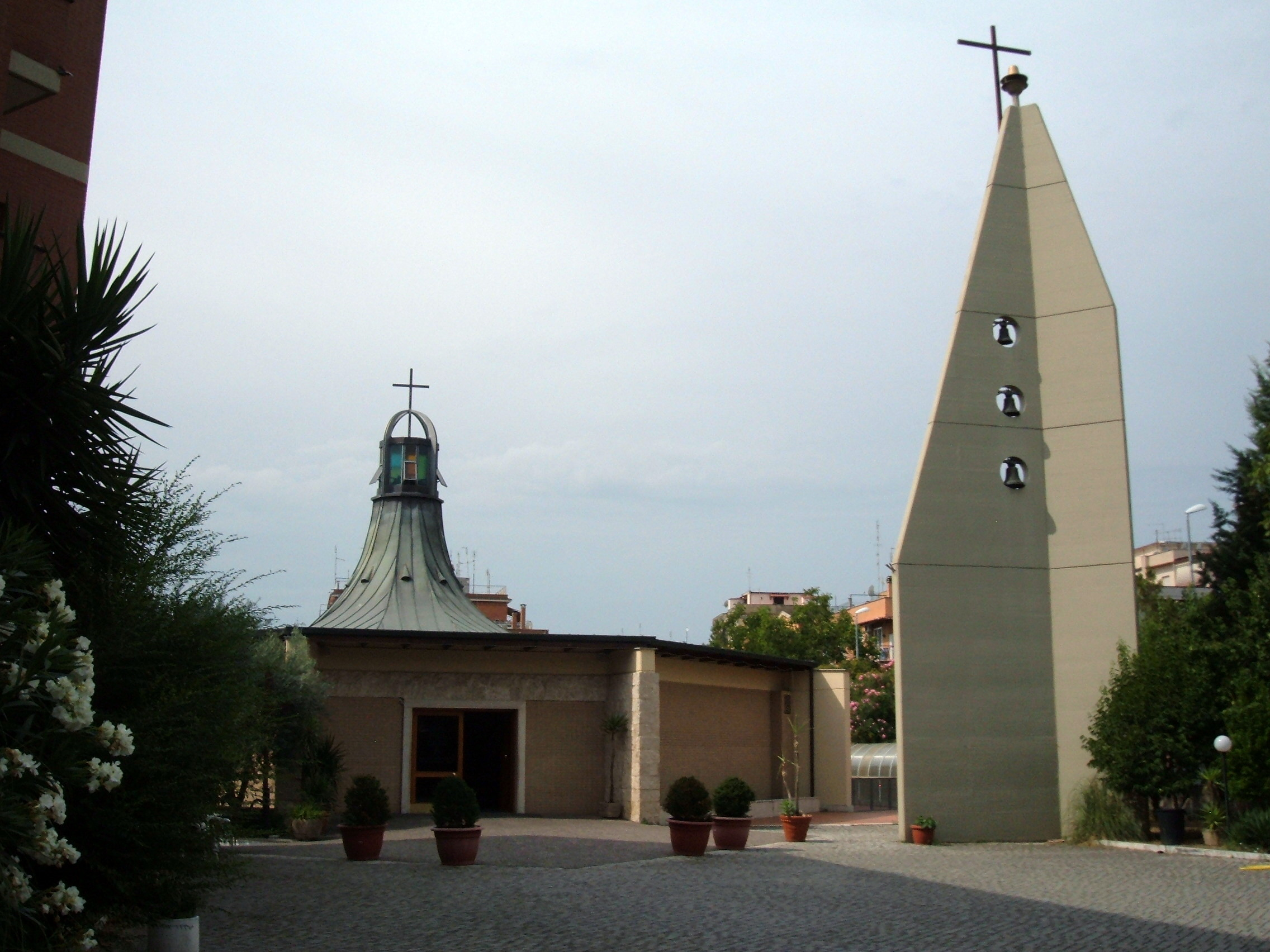

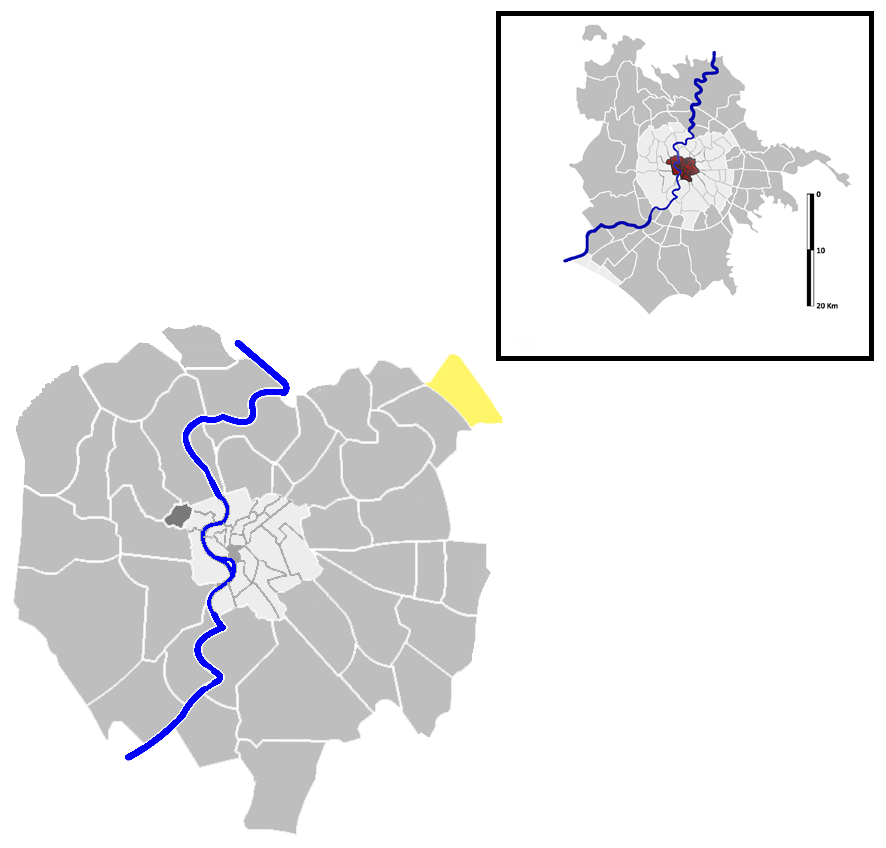
- Position of the quartiere within the city of Rome
- Country: Italy
- Region: Lazio
- Metropolitan City: Rome
- Comune: Rome
- Municipio: Municipio IV
- Established: 13 September 1961

Area
  - Total: 1.4602 sq mi (3.7818 km^{2})

Population (2016)
  - Total: 22,711
- Time zone: UTC+1 (CET)
  - Summer (DST): UTC+2 (CEST)

San Basilio is the 30th quartiere of Rome (Italy), identified by the initials Q. XXX. It belongs to the Municipio IV.
