= Castel Giubileo =

Z. II Castel Giubileo
- Zone of Rome
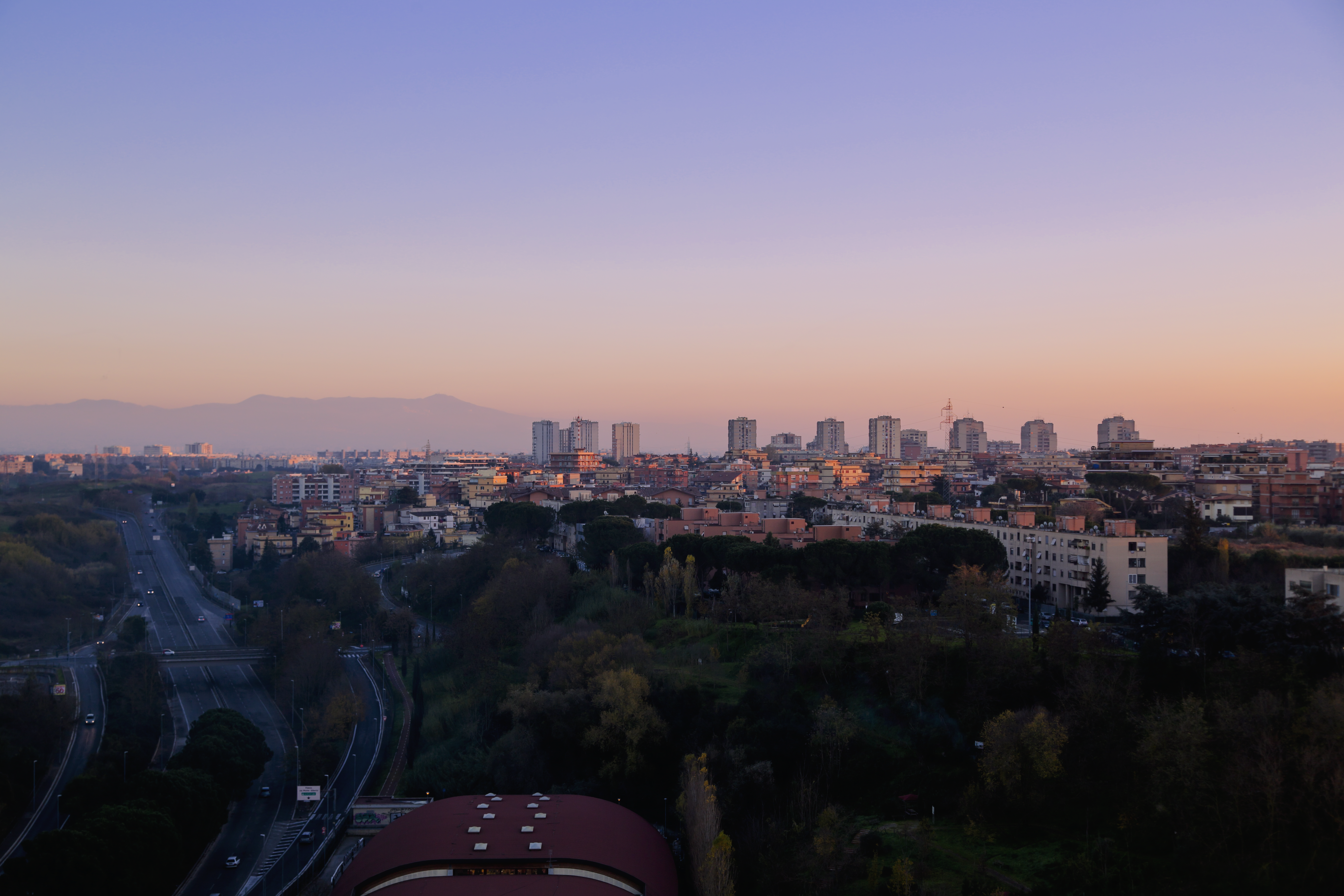
- Panorama of the frazione Colle Salario

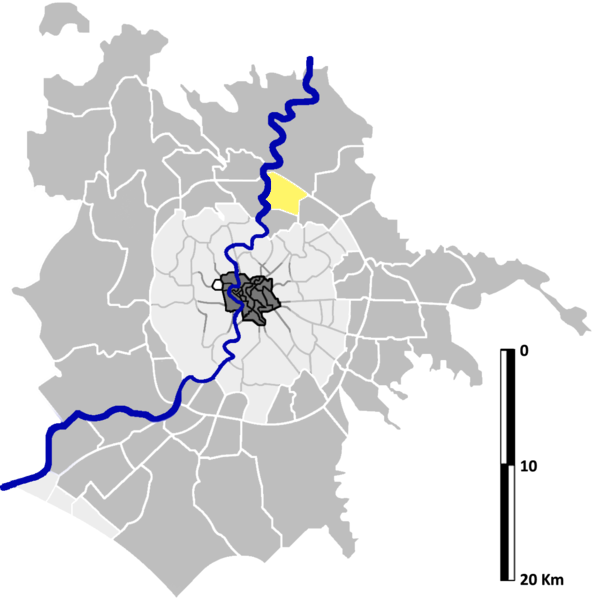
- Position of the Zone within the Municipality of Rome.
- Country: Italy
- Region: Lazio
- Province: Rome
- Comune: Rome
- Municipi of Rome: Municipio III
- Established: 13 September 1961

Area
  - Total: 7.6635 km^{2} (2.9589 sq mi)

Population
  - Total: 44,980
  - Density: 5,869/km^{2} (15,200/sq mi)
- Time zone: UTC+1 (CET)
  - Summer (DST): UTC+2 (CEST)
- Area code: 402

Castel Giubileo is the second Zone of Rome in the Ager Romanus, identified as Z. II.

== History ==
The history of the current Castel Giubileo dates back directly to the ancient city of Fidenae which, based on archaeological evidence, was built around the 11th century BC in an extremely important strategic position between Via Salaria and Via Nomentana. From here, it dominated the commercial routes between Etruria, Sabina and southern Italy, as well as the navigable stretch of the Tiber, where the commercial traffic took place. The settlement, surrounded by walls, extended its control to the area of Monte Sacro and was flourishing – above all because of the fertility of the soil, due to the proximity to the river and the presence of volcanic debris or tuffs) – even before the foundation of Rome.

In 1280 the area belonged to the monastery of St. Cyriacus. Later, the castle (castrum) was purchased by Pope Boniface VIII, maybe with the proceeds from the 1300 Jubilee. It is commonly assumed that this is the origin of the name Castel Giubileo, although the name actually derives from the Giubilei family from the rione Trevi, to which a Buzio di Giubileo belonged still in 1371.

Due to the strategic importance of its location, the condottiero Paolo Orsini attacked and occupied it in 1406. Stories of looting and depredations continued in the following periods, thus leading to the complete abandonment of the Castle until the end of the 19th century, when it began to be used for agricultural purposes.

The present urban settlement was built after World War II by immigrants coming from many Italian regions, including the first Venetian farmhands, called by Mussolini for the reclamation of the Ager Romanus.

=== The Castel Giubileo train wreck ===
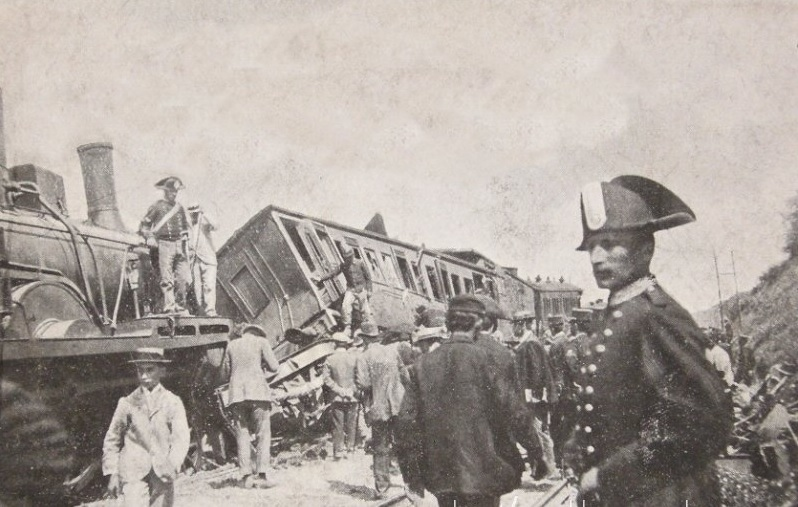
A photo of the trains after the collision.

On 12 August 1900, at. 11:51 pm, the area was the scene of a serious train wreck, which occurred along the Florence-Rome railway. A failure to report a train, which had stopped due to a breakdown, caused a rear-end collision with twenty victims and a hundred injured. The disaster had great resonance at the time, as the crashed train was transporting the foreign delegations who had just attended the funeral of King Umberto I and the subsequent coronation of Victor Emmanuel III.

Among the victims was the Baron Giuseppe Baratelli, Senator of the Kingdom, to whom Alfredo Oriani dedicated his book Ombre di occaso. Other notable passengers involved in the wreck were the Duke of Oporto, the Turkish delegation and the representative of the King of Belgium, who suffered the fracture of both legs.

== Geography ==
The zone is located in the northern area of the city, close to and inside the Grande Raccordo Anulare. The territory of Castel Giubileo includes the urban zones 4D Fidene, 4E Serpentara and part of the urban zone 4L Aeroporto dell'Urbe.

The historical village of Castel Giubileo, wedged between the Via Salaria and the river Tiber, is made up of three small, distinct cores, one of which is located on the low hill where the castle rises. The two cores at the foot of the hill converge in a larger one in the north, structured according to a sequence of parallel streets between two main roads (Via Grottazzolina and Via Montappone) which can be regarded as the main axes of the settlement. At the western end of this area there are small artisan businesses and some hotels. The modest commercial area extends along the axis in the south. Another housing complex is located close to the bank of the Tiber; there is also a primary school and a nursery.

The shopping center Galleria Porta di Roma, surrounded by Via Casale Redicicoli, on the border with Casal Boccone, was inaugurated in 2007.

=== Boundaries ===
Castel Giubileo's northern border is the Zona Marcigliana (Z.III), whose boundary is marked by a stretch of the Grande Raccordo Anulare, between Ponte di Castel Giubileo and Via di Settebagni.

Eastward, the zone borders the Zona Casal Boccone (Z. IV), separated by Via di Settebagni (near the Grande Raccordo Anulare), Viale Franco Arcalli, Piazza Giulietta Masina, Via Elsa de' Giorgi, Via Giuseppe De Santis and Via delle Vigne Nuove up to the Viadotto Antonio Segni.

To the south, it borders the Zona Val Melaina (Z. I): the border is marked by Viadotto Antonio Segni up to Via Giacomo Brodolini, then by the latter up to Via Gaetano Martino, by Via Pian di Scò 41.963660°N 12.518984°E; from here, as the crow flies, to the river Tiber 41.965153°N 12.504504°E.

To the west, Castel Giubileo borders the Zona Grottarossa (Z. LVI), separated by the Tiber, up to the Ponte di Castel Giubileo (Grande Raccordo Anulare).

=== Historical subdivisions ===
The frazioni of Colle Salario and Villa Spada belong to the territory of Castel Giubileo.

=== Odonymy ===
In addition to the odonyms of the area of Fidene (municipalities of Tuscany), Colle Salario (municipalities of Marche), streets and squares are mainly dedicated to actors and directors (particularly in the area of Serpentara) and to opera singers. In the frazione of Villa Spada, there is a group of streets named after religious personalities. Odonyms of the zone can be categorized as follows:

- Actors, e.g. Via Ferruccio Amendola, Via Rosina Anselmi, Viale Cesco Baseggio, Viale Carmelo Bene, Largo Lyda Borelli, Via Ernesto Calindri, Via Mario Castellani, Via Adolfo Celi, Viale Gino Cervi, Via Luigi Cimara, Viale Titina De Filippo, Via Elsa De Giorgi, Via Tina Di Lorenzo, Via Franco Fabrizi, Via Franco Franchi, Via Sylva Koscina, Via Alberto Lionello, Piazza Giulietta Masina, Via Maria Melato, Largo Rina Morelli, Via Tina Pica, Via Salvo Randone, Via Stefano Satta Flores, Via Sergio Tofano, Via Gian Maria Volonté;
- Directors, e.g. Via Carlo Ludovico Bragaglia, Via Leonardo De Mitri, Via Giuseppe De Santis, Via Fratelli Corbucci (dedicated to brothers Bruno and Sergio Corbucci), Via Alberto Lattuada, Via Nanni Loy, Via Giorgio Moser, Via Elvira Notari, Via Mario Soldati, Largo Luchino Visconti;
- Film producers, e.g. Via Giuseppe Amato, Via Goffredo Lombardo;
- Opera singers, e.g. Via Matteo Babini, Via Cesare Badiali, Piazza Marianna Benti Bulgarelli, Viale Lina Cavalieri, Via Nazzareno De Angelis, Piazza Fernando De Lucia, Via Bernardo De Muro, Via Mario Del Monaco, Largo Cloe Elmo, Via Erminia Frezzolini, Via Edoardo Garbin, Via Luigi Lablache, Via Gaspare Pacchiarotti, Via Ezio Pinza, Via Tito Schipa, Via Sorelle Tetrazzini (dedicated to the sisters Eva and Luisa Tetrazzini);
- Religious figures, e.g. Via San Bernardino da Siena, Via Gaspare Bertoni, Via Maria Elena Bettini, Via Ludovico da Casoria, Via Francesco Antonio Marcucci, Via Annibale Maria di Francia, Via San Massimiliano Kolbe, Via San Pietro Parenzo;
- Singers and songwriters, e.g. Piazza Franco Califano, Via Rino Gaetano, Largo Luigi Tenco;
- Towns of Marche, e.g. Largo Borgo Pace, Via Camerata Picena, Via Castelsantangelo sul Nera, Via Comunanza, Via Cupramontana, Via Fiastra, Via Grottazzolina, Via Montappone, Via Monte Giberto, Via Monte Urano, Largo Montedinove, Via Rapagnano, Largo Santa Vittoria in Matenano, Via Serrapetrona;
- Towns of Tuscany, e.g. Via Altopascio, Via Barberino di Mugello, Via Cortona, Via Incisa Valdarno, Via Lajatico, Via Pieve a Nievole, Via Quarrata, Via Radicofani, Via Rio nell'Elba, Via Sambuca Pistoiese, Via San Gimignano, Via Sansepolcro, Piazza Stia, Via Vernio;
- TV hosts, e.g. Via Corrado Mantoni.

The area is crossed by a viaduct, three sections of which are dedicated to the presidents of the Italian Republic Sandro Pertini, Antonio Segni and Giuseppe Saragat.

== Infrastructure and transport ==
The Fidene railway station, which is located along the Florence–Rome railway, is served by regional trains managed by Trenitalia on the basis of the contract of service stipulated with the Lazio Region.

Between 1906 and 1932 the locality was also served by a stop of the Rome-Civita Castellana tramway, managed by Società Romana per le Ferrovie del Nord (SRFN).

== Places of interest ==
=== Civil buildings ===
- Castel Giubileo, in Salita di Castel Giubileo. A 14th-century castle. 41.988143°N 12.507333°E
- Casale di Villa Spada, in Via Piteglio. A 19th-century farmhouse. 41.978828°N 12.510286°E
- Ponte di Castel Giubileo, a bridge of the Grande Raccordo Anulare on the river Tiber, opened in 1951.

=== Religious buildings ===
- Santa Felicita e figli martiri, in Via Don Giustino Maria Russolillo.

Parish church erected on 16 July 1958 according to the decree "Sanctissimus dominus" by Cardinal Vicar Clemente Micara.

- Santi Crisante e Daria, in Via Castignano.

Parish church erected on 1 July 1964 according to the decree "Quo pastorali studio" by Cardinal Vicar Clemente Micara.

- Sant'Innocenzo I papa e San Guido vescovo, in via Radicofani.

Parish church erected on 1 March 1981 by decree of Cardinal Vicar Ugo Poletti.

- Sant'Alberto Magno, in Via delle Vigne Nuove.

Parish church erected on 1 September 1983 according to the decree "Seguendo l'esempio" by Cardinal Vicar Ugo Poletti.

- Sant'Ugo, in Viale Lina Cavalieri.
- San Giovanni della Croce a Colle Salario, in via Apecchio.

=== Archaeological sites ===
- Protohistoric house of Fidenae, in Via Quarrata. A house built in the 9th century BC.
- Villa of Via Serrapetrona, in Via Serrapetrona. A 2nd-century BC villa.
- Villa of Castel Giubileo (site I), in Via Force. A 1st-century BC villa. 41.985370°N 12.512944°E
- Villa of Castel Giubileo (site XV), in Via Piagge and Via Monteciccardo. A 1st-century BC villa.
- Villa of Tenuta Serpentara (site 1), in Via dei Colli della Serpentara. A 1st-century BC villa.
- Villa of Tenuta Serpentara (site 2), in Via dei Colli della Serpentara. A 1st-century BC villa.
- Villa of Via Cesco Baseggio, in Viale Cesco Baseggio. A 1st-century BC villa.
- Paleochristian basilica Beati Arcangeli in Septimo, in Salita di Castel Giubileo. A basilica of the imperial age.41.987217°N 12.507724°E
- Roman cistern of Villa Spada, in Via Maria Elena Bettini. A cistern of the imperial age.41.973072°N 12.506937°E

=== Museums ===
- Museo della carta, della stampa e dell'informazione, in via Salaria. 41.967392°N 12.506125°E

=== Nature areas ===
- Parco Carlo Marzano, in Via Virgilio Talli. 41.964061°N 12.523381°E
- Parco delle Betulle, in Viale Lina Cavalieri. 41.967642°N 12.511784°E
- Parco di Largo Labia, in Largo Fausta Labia. 41.969335°N 12.521524°E

== Bibliography ==
- Marina De Franceschini (2005). Ville dell'Agro romano. Rome: L'Erma di Bretschneider. ISBN 978-88-8265-311-8.
