= Colle Salario =

- Frazione of Rome
- Interactive map of Colle Salario
- Country: Italy
- Region: Lazio
- Province: Rome
- Comune: Rome
- Municipi of Rome: Municipio III
- Time zone: UTC+1 (CET)
  - Summer (DST): UTC+2 (CEST)
- Area code: 402
- Patron saint: St. John of the Cross

Colle Salario is a frazione of the Municipality of Rome (Italy), located in the zone Z. II Castel Giubileo, within the territory of the urban zone 4E Serpentara of the Municipio Roma III (former Municipio Roma IV).

It is located in the north of Rome, within the corner delimited by Via Salaria in the west and the Grande Raccordo Anulare in the north. It is immediately north of the urban zone 4D Fidene, with which it shares a stop of the former Ferrovie dello Stato along the Fara Sabina – Roma Tiburtina railway line.

== History ==
Colle Salario was established in the mid-1980s, according to the Master Plan approved by the Municipality of Rome, close to the Grande Raccordo Anulare (Exit nr. 7–8–9), with services, parking lots and shops.

== Monuments and places of interest ==
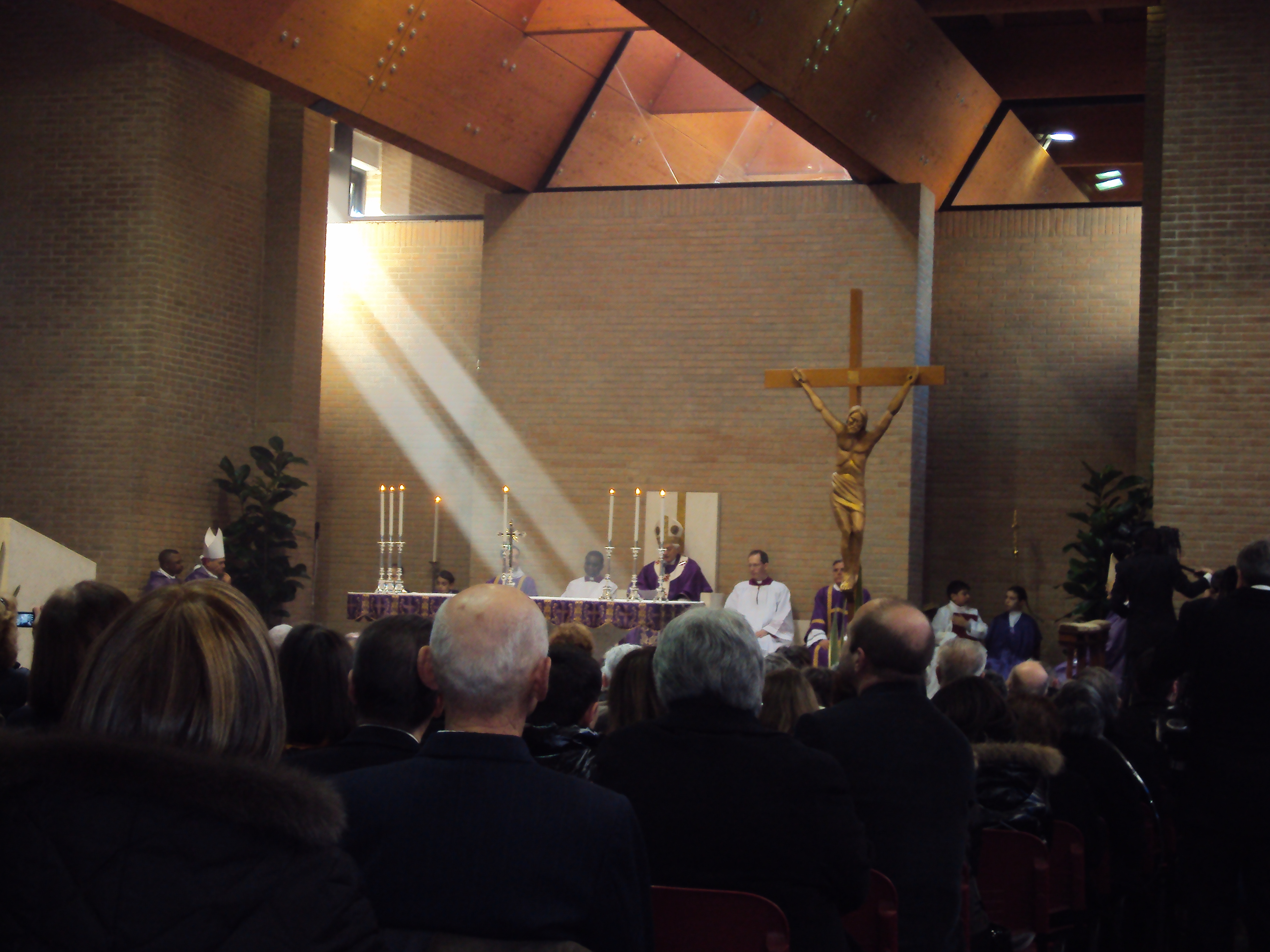
Interior of San Giovanni della Croce

=== Religious buildings ===
- San Giovanni della Croce a Colle Salario, in Via Apecchio.

=== Archaeological sites ===
In the area of today's Colle Salario, there are the remains of several villae.

- Villa di Via Serrapetrona, in Via Serrapetrona and Via Belmonte Piceno. A villa of the 2nd century BC.
- Villa di Castel Giubileo (site I), in Via Force. A villa of the 1st century BC (see Marina De Franceschini, chapt. 12. Villa di Castel Giubileo (sito I), pp. 56–57). 41.985370°N 12.512944°E
- Villa di Castel Giubileo (site XV), in Via Piagge and Via Monteciccardo. A villa of the 1st century BC (see Marina De Franceschini, chapt. 13. Villa di Castel Giubileo (sito XV), pp. 57–59).

== Odonyms ==
The streets of Colle Salario are dedicated to municipalities in the Marche:

- Camerata Picena and Serra de' Conti in the Province of Ancona
- Force, Montalto delle Marche, Montedinove and Palmiano in the Province of Ascoli Piceno
- Belmonte Piceno, Grottazzolina, Monte Giberto, Monte Urano, Petritoli, Monterubbiano, Rapagnano and Servigliano in the Province of Fermo
- Apiro, Fiastra, Monte San Giusto and Serrapetrona in the Province of Macerata
- Apecchio, Borgo Pace, Monte Grimano Terme, Monteciccardo, Novilara, Piagge, San Leo, Sassofeltrio and Talamello in the Province of Pesaro and Urbino

The frazione is connected to Fidene by Via Incisa in Val d'Arno, dedicated to the homonymous municipality of Tuscany in the Province of Florence.

Following the realization, in 2007, of the residential project "Porta di Roma", two new roads, dedicated to Carmelo Bene and Vittorio Caprioli, were created to connect Colle Salario to the new shopping center. The square overlooked by the Fidene Railway Station is named after Don Antonio Penazzi.

Finally, we find the viaduct named after Sandro Pertini, part of the complex of the "viaducts of the presidents".

== Bibliography ==
- Marina De Franceschini (2005). Ville dell'Agro romano. Rome: L'Erma di Bretschneider. ISBN 978-88-8265-311-8.
