= Rebibbia =

Urban zone of Rome, Italy

Coordinates: 41°55′51″N 12°34′18″E

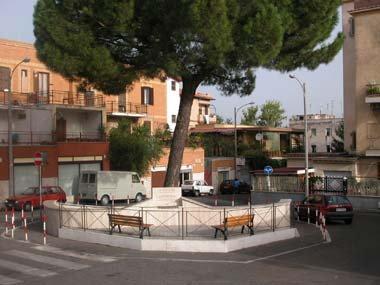
Rebibbia

Rebibbia is an urban zone of Rome, Italy. It is located on the ancient Via Tiburtina on the northeast edge of the city. Administratively Rebibbia is part of both Ponte Mammolo quarter of Rome and Municipio IV of Rome.

The suburb, first developed at the start of the 20th century, consists almost completely of family homes, largely built with few floors and small gardens, in an almost rural style. The two churches of the Via Casal de' Pazzi and Piazza Ferriani are simple, having been renovated in a modern style.

The eponymous prison holds 352 women and 1927 men. It has entrances on vias Bartolo Longo and Tiburtina. It is one of the major Italian prisons intended for rehabilitation and social reintegration of inmates. It housed would-be papal assassin Mehmet Ali Ağca during his prison time in Italy, when Agca met his would-be victim Pope John Paul II on 27 December 1983 and was forgiven by him. Ship captain Francesco Schettino is a prominent inmate.

== Connections ==
Rebibbia is served by the station Rebibbia on line B of the Rome Metro. It is the terminus of the Rebibbia-Laurentina line.
