= Casalotti =

Coordinates: 41.915819°N 12.368631°E

Casalotti is the name of the forty-eighth zone of Rome in the Agro Romano, denoted by Z. XLVIII. It is the namesake of the frazione of the same name. The area takes its name from the main road to Casalotti name, probably due to the numerous houses that were in the area. Surrounded by green hills, the center of the hamlet of Casalotti (Ormea Square and Church of St. Rita of Cascia) is situated at an altitude of about 110 m above sea level.

== Boundaries ==
It is located in the north-west of Rome, outside the Ring Road. The area borders:

- north-west zone Z. XLIX Santa Maria di Galeria
- area to the north by Z. LI The Retort
- north-east area Z.L Octavia
- west suburbs with the Triumphal SX IX and S. Aurelius
- south-west zone Z. XLV Castel di Guido

== History ==
In May 1944, it was destroyed by Allied bombing along with the nearby Grottarossa, during the advance of the Allies themselves to hunt the German settlements. The real estate boom dates back to the 1970s, when many construction companies started to build the most ancient part (the square and the area from Via Trofarello). Yet it is still being expanded. On 29 September 2009 the president of AS Roma Rosella Sensi announced the project of building a new soccer stadium in the southern area, near the Via Aurelia.

== Historical buildings ==
- The Roman Villa of being Casalotti was found accidentally in 1930 during agricultural work. Subsequent excavations by the Sovrintendenza have brought to light terracotta pots and a heating system. The excavations were resumed later in the period 1983-85 and 2000. The construction of the villa dates from the 2nd century AD. and it was used until the 4th century. It is currently run by the Roman Archaeological Group Onlus.
- Porcareccia Castle: Medieval village with some houses.
- The Fountain being Boccea Coach, "La lame."

== Religious buildings ==
- Church of Santa Maria di Loreto Casalotti, being Boccea. Seat of the parish of the same name.
- Church of St. Mary of Nazareth, being Boccea. Seat of the parish of the same name.
- Church of St. Rita of Cascia in Casalotti alley. Seat of the parish of the same name.
- Church of St. Gemma Galgani, the streets Porcareccia Castle, home of the "parish of Saints Rufina and Second."
- Church of Santa Maria in Piazza Castello di Porcareccia, inside the castle of Porcareccia.
- Church of St. Mark the Evangelist and Pius X, in the Casal Selce. Seat of the parish of the same name.

== Education ==
In Casalotti are:

- Kindergarten / elementary school Alfredo Bajocco 259
- Kindergarten / elementary school Alfredo Bajocco 85
- High school Livio Tempesta
- High school Giuseppe Verdi
- Kindergarten / elementary / high school I. C. Boccea 590

== Gallery ==
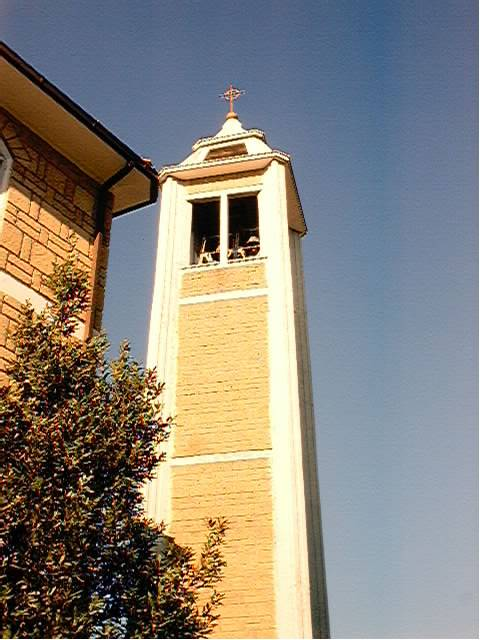
Bell tower of St. Rita

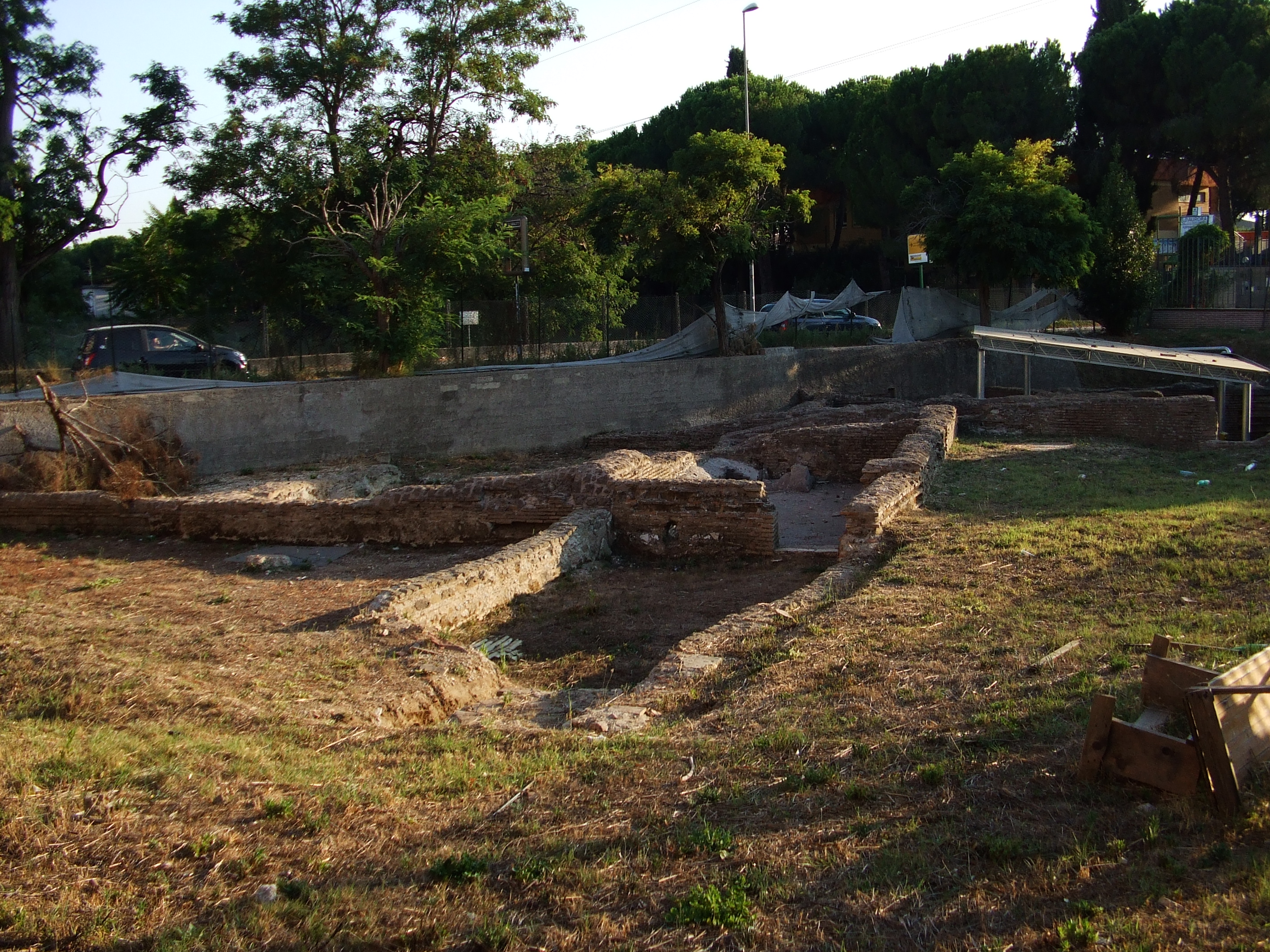
The Roman Villa

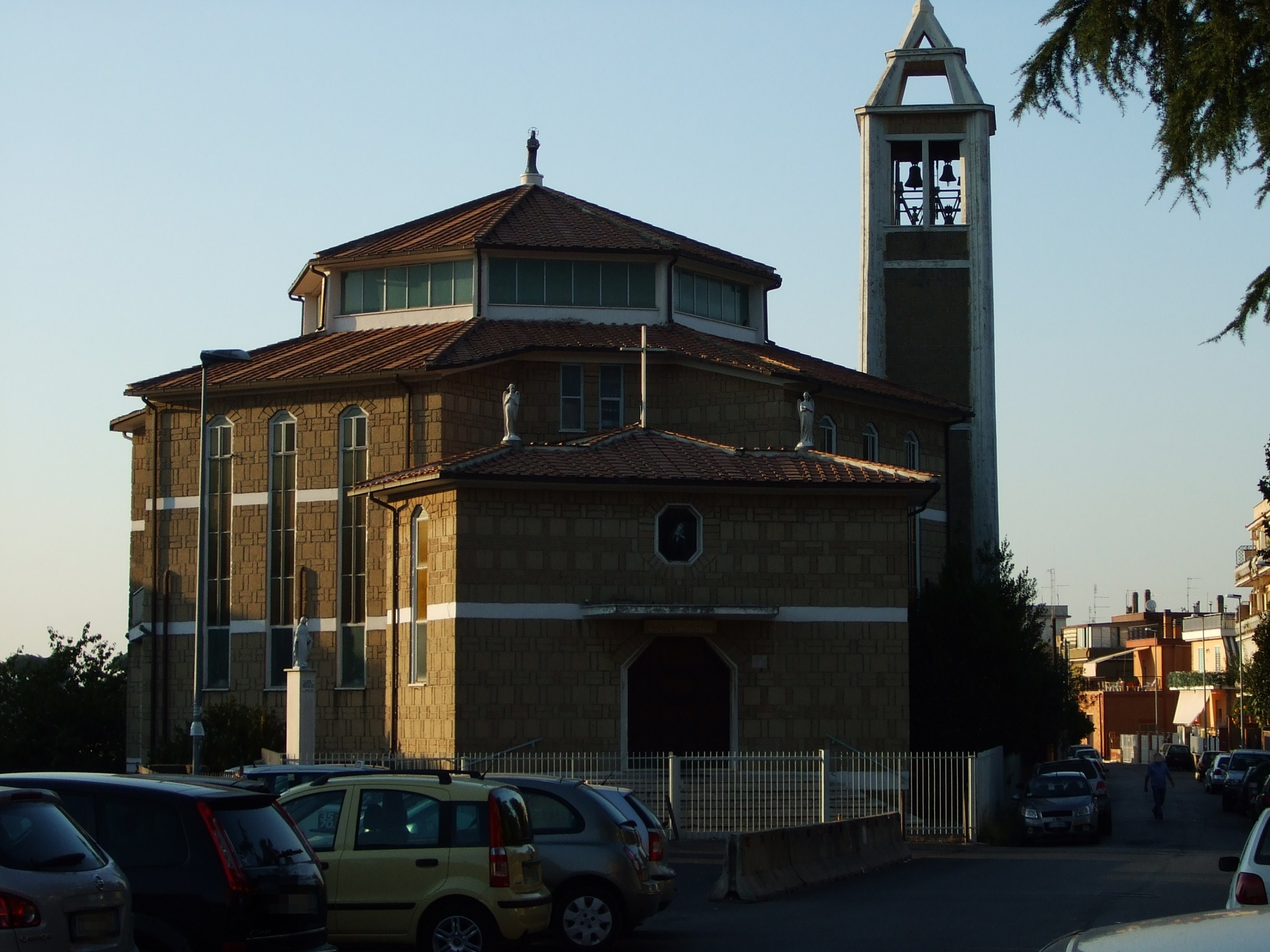
Church of St. Rita of Cascia
