= Monte Sacro Alto =

- Quartiere of Rome
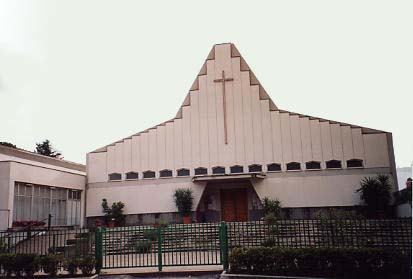
- The church of San Ponziano

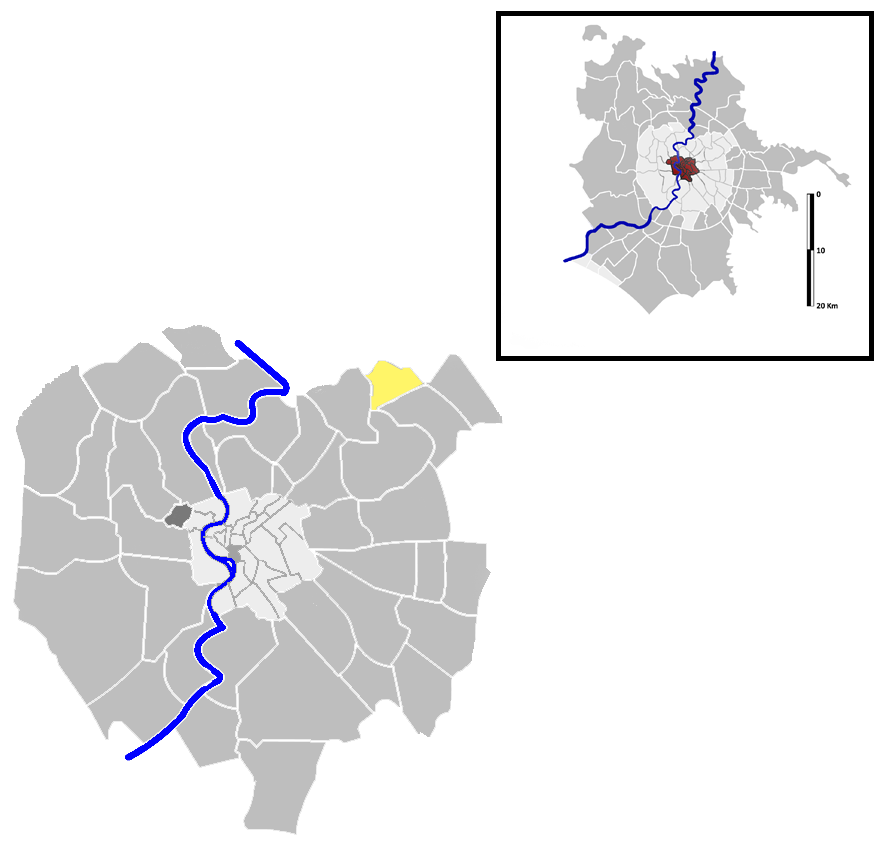
- Position of the quartiere within the city
- Country: Italy
- Region: Lazio
- Province: Rome
- Comune: Rome

Area
  - Total: 0.8737 sq mi (2.2629 km^{2})

Population (2016)
  - Total: 32,223
  - Density: 36,880.6/sq mi (14,239.69/km^{2})
- Time zone: UTC+1 (CET)
  - Summer (DST): UTC+2 (CEST)

Monte Sacro Alto (known predominantly informally as Talenti) is the 28th quartiere of the city of Rome in Italy, and it is identified by the initials Q. XXVIII. As a quarter, or second level administrative division, it is one of two that comprise the first level division or Municipality of Municipio III.

Monte Sacro Alto is situated in the north-eastern area of the capital. The borough is locally referred to as Quartiere Talenti after the Talenti noble family who began developing the residential area on their estate in the 1950's. Achille Talenti, one of 20th century Italy's most prolific urban planners and engineers, was responsible for the inception, realization and management of the borough.

== History ==
Born in the 1960s, the area was previously a rural zone owned by the Talenti family. The new quartiere is characterized by residential buildings and flat complexes, generally with 4 or 5 stories and surrounded by a court.

Until 1965 the neighborhood was managed by SIRA, one of Achille Talenti's companies.

== Geography ==
=== Boundaries ===
Northward and eastward, the quartiere borders with Zona Casal Boccone (Z. IV), whose border is marked by the stretch of Via della Bufalotta between Via della Cecchina and Via Roberto Bracco and by Via Roberto Bracco itself; then the boundary runs through the countryside up to Via Arrigo Cajumi and through the Parco Talenti, up to Via di Casal Boccone, the latter marking the border up to Via Nomentana.

Southward, the quartiere borders with Quartiere Ponte Mammolo (Q. XXIX), from which is separated by Via Nomentana, up to Via Jacopo Sannazaro.

To the west, the quartiere borders with Quartiere Monte Sacro (Q. XVI), whose boundary is marked by Via Jacopo Sannazaro, by a stretch in the countryside, by a short stretch of Viale Jonio, by Via Matteo Bandello and by Via della Cecchina.

=== Local geography ===
The main square of the district is Piazza Piercarlo Talenti, named after Achille Talenti's older brother who died prematurely in a car accident in 1925. Another relevant square is Largo Sergio Pugliese, the local terminus of the public transport.

The main arteries of the area are Via Ugo Ojetti, with a high concentration of commercial activities, Via Arturo Graf and Via Renato Fucini.

Several green areas are located in Monte Sacro Alto, usually remains of the Agro Romano countryside, like Parco Talenti, Parco della Cecchina and Parco delle Mimose.

Almost all the roads and the squares in the quartiere are dedicated to authors, poets and journalists, e.g. Via Giuseppe Cesare Abba, Via Pietro Aretino Via Cecco Angiolieri, Via Elisabetta Barrett, Via Luigi Capuana, Via Melchiorre Cesarotti, Piazza Sergio Corazzini, Via Grazia Deledda, Via Teofilo Folengo, Via Veronica Gambara, Piazza Guido Gozzano, Via Ada Negri, Via Luigi Pirandello, Via Franco Sacchetti, Piazza Leonardo Sciascia, Via Gaspara Stampa, Via Giovanni Verga.

== Places of interest ==
=== Churches ===
- San Mattia
- Sant'Achille
- San Ponziano

=== Other ===
- "Fabrizio Frizzi" RAI television studios
