= Municipio IV =

Municipio IV di Roma
- Municipio of Rome
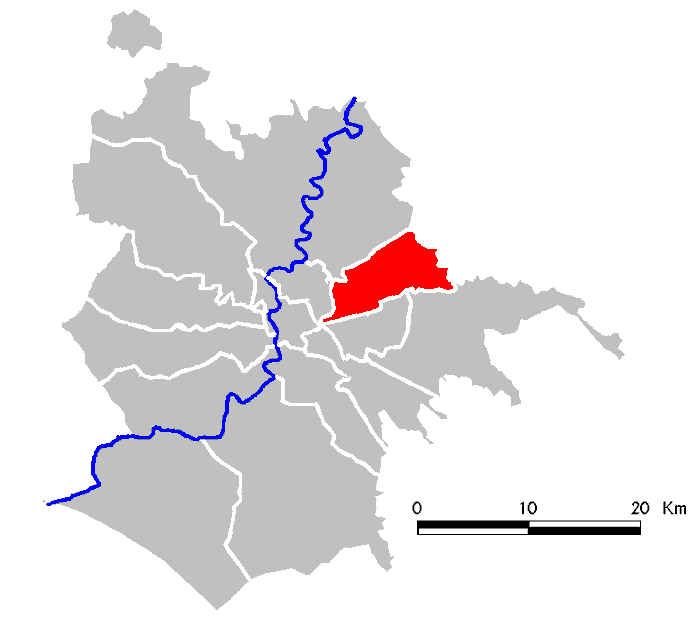
- Location of Municipio IV of Rome
- Country: Italy
- Region: Lazio
- Comune: Rome
- Established: 2013

Government
  - President: Massimiliano Uberti (Democratic Party)

Population (2016)
  - Total: 176,981
- Time zone: UTC+1 (CET)
  - Summer (DST): UTC+2 (CEST)

Municipio IV (or Municipality 4) is one of the 15 administrative subdivisions of the city of Rome in Italy. It is located in the northeastern part of the capital.

The Rebibbia urban zone and Rebibbia prison lie within this municipality.
