= Prenestino-Centocelle =

Q. XIX Prenestino-Centocelle
- Quartiere of Rome
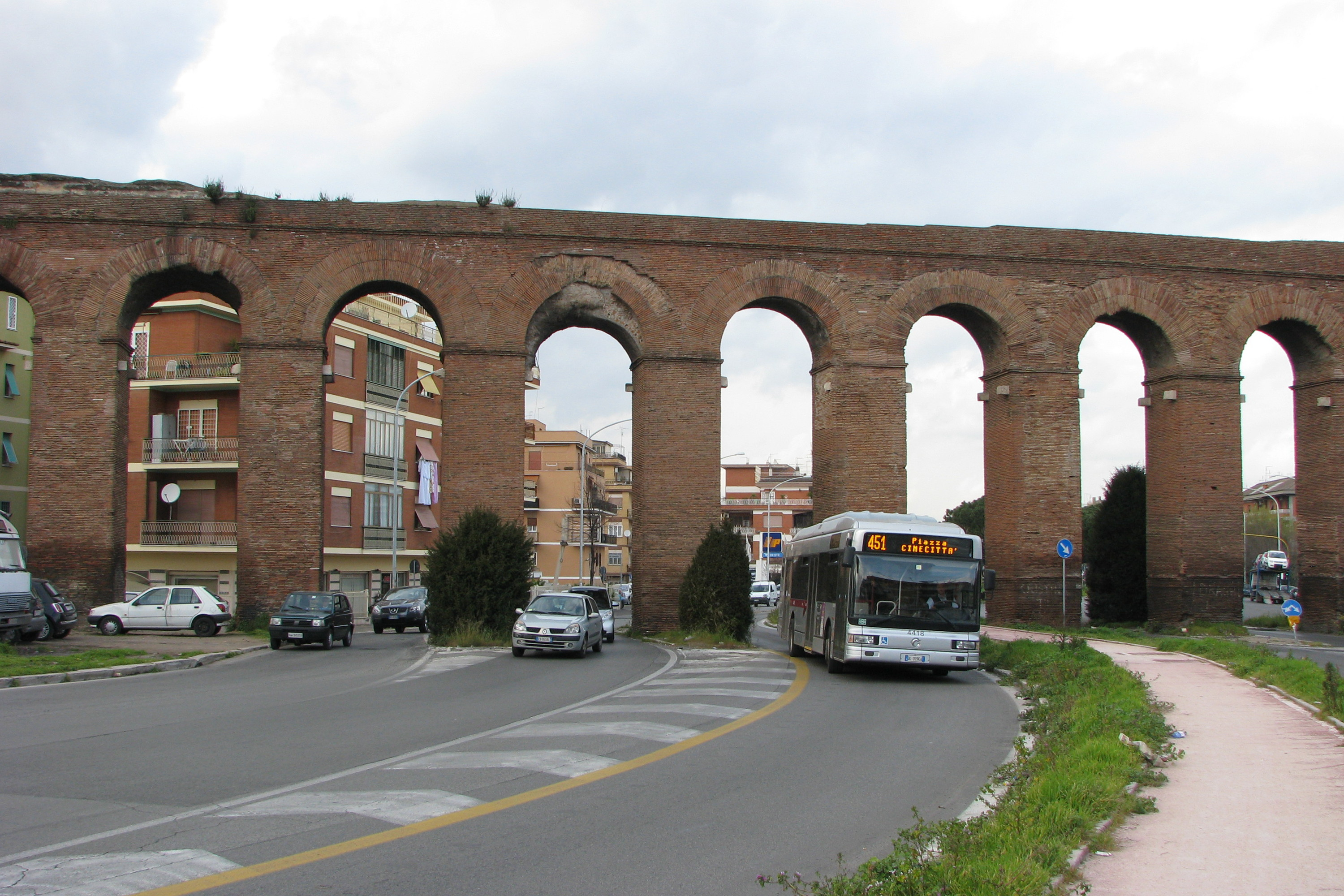

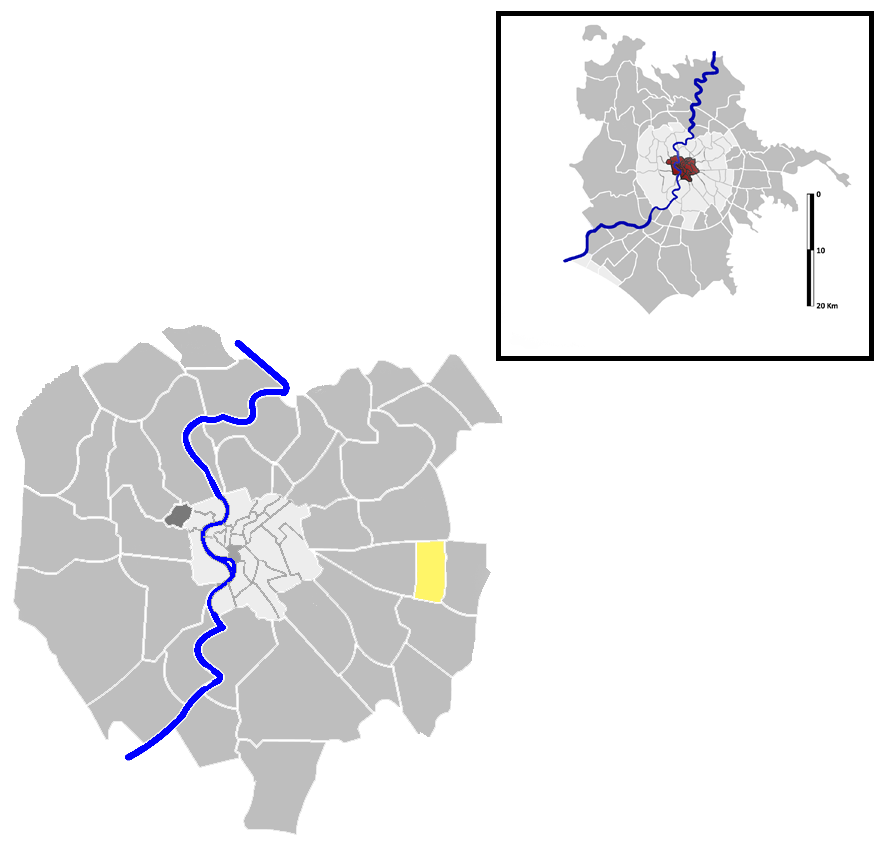
- Position of the quartiere within the city of Rome
- Country: Italy
- Region: Lazio
- Metropolitan City: Rome
- Comune: Rome
- Municipio: Municipio V
- Established: 13 September 1961

Area
  - Total: 0.80 sq mi (2.08 km^{2})
- Time zone: UTC+1 (CET)
  - Summer (DST): UTC+2 (CEST)

Prenestino-Centocelle is the 19th quartiere of Rome (Italy), identified by the initials Q. XIX. It belongs to the Municipio V. The name is derived from the Via Praenestina and the fortress Centrocelle: Centum Cellae of Constantine the Great. It has 53,492 inhabitants and has an area of 2.0816 km^{2}.

It forms the zone urban zone designated with the code 7.a, with 56,408 inhabitants and an area of 3 km^{2}.
