= Catacomb of Saint Thecla =

Catacomb in Rome, Italy

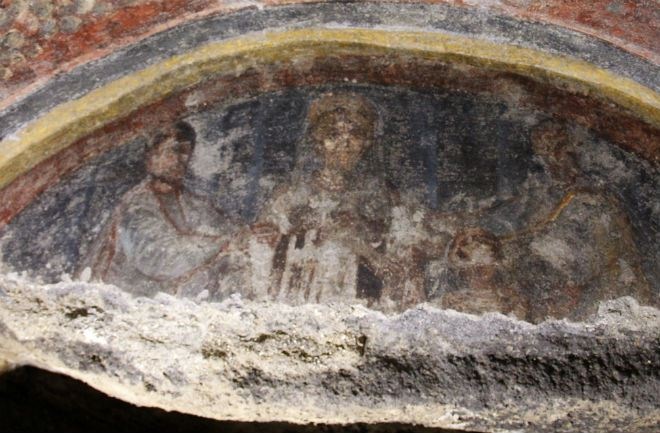
Christian imagery in the Catacomb of Saint Thecla

The Catacomb of Saint Thecla is a Christian catacomb in the city of Rome, near the Via Ostiense and the Basilica of Saint Paul Outside the Walls, in the southern quarter of the ancient city. The catacomb was constructed in the fourth century of the Common Era, linked with a basilica to the saint that is alluded to in literature. Because of the enigmatic endings of the legends of Saint Thecla of Iconium, it is still unknown whether the tomb belongs to the saint or if it belongs to a different noblewoman. Regardless, the tomb is an example of early Christian funerary practice and artwork. The most recent discovery in the catacomb was the depiction of several apostles, hypothesized to be their earliest portrayals. Of particular interest to many is the portrait of the Apostle Paul.

== Location ==
Thecla's catacomb is located along the current Via Silvia D'Amico, in the southern Ostiense quarter which has mostly been used as an industrial centre over the centuries. It lies three kilometres south of the ancient Aurelian Wall, corresponding roughly with the intersection between the Via Ostiense and the Via Laurentina. Being outside the city walls was ordinary protocol for burial sites, both pagan and Christian. There are several Christian burial sites along (and near) the Via Ostiense, notably the Basilica of Saint Paul, which is the traditionally-held site of his burial. Also nearby is the Commodilla Catacomb, containing the bodies of several martyrs. This cluster of Roman catacombs is one of several around the city, the other major clusters being along the Via Appia and Via Nomentana, for example.

== History ==
The catacomb was constructed in the 4th century, a re-use of a first-century pagan necropolis. The catacomb is referenced in several ancient sources, namely pilgrimage itineraries like the Notitia Ecclesiarum Urbis Romae (7th century). According to the itineraries, there was a church dedicated to the saint as well: "'...and so you visit Saint Paul on the Via Ostiensis, and to the south see the church of Saint Thecla standing on a hill, in which her body rests in a cave at the northern end'". Unfortunately, the church is no longer extant and no traces have been found. The catacomb itself seems to have fallen into disuse in the 9th century. In recent times, it was first identified in 1870 by archaeologist Mariano Armellini, in accordance with the pilgrimage itineraries, and was thus excavated. Further excavations occurred in the 1960s under Umberto Fasola, and then in the 1980s under Valnea Santa Maria Scrinari. Both of these archaeologists concluded that the catacomb, like many other Christian burial sites, was repurposed space, i.e. underground storerooms cut into the tufa rock. Furthermore, the materials used within the catacombs were imperial building bricks and they were incorporated into the structures.

== Description ==
There are several chambers within the catacomb of various sizes, labelled Hypogea A-D. They are connected by ambulatories (walking spaces), as this was a place where people would visit on a regular basis, depending on who was buried there. A notable feature – shared by the nearby catacomb of Commodilla – is that throughout the complex, there are spots for many tombs to be packed into a relatively small space. One of the hypogea contains a shrine with a sarcophagus, surrounded by many slots for other, smaller tombs. This was common in Christian catacombs, where followers of a specific cult would request to be buried alongside the saint and/or martyr. Even if the catacomb was not dedicated to the martyr Thecla of Iconium, the tomb of a noblewoman may be surrounded by those of close family members.

There is archaeological evidence for several phases of construction in the life of the catacomb. One of the main signs is the presence of a staircase, constructed during the earlier phases. It connected the catacomb to the church above, and also shows that there was more than one floor. The catacomb contains many worn frescoes and some mosaic pavements as well. The decoration within the catacomb is modest, lacking the usually abundant inscriptions and grave goods. There are several possible explanations for this: 1) the materials were removed for reuse elsewhere, as was common practice; 2) decoration was lost in the renovations of the catacomb; 3) or, the people involved in the construction of the catacomb were poor and exercised simplicity in their decoration. Excavations have revealed mosaics and frescoes displaying biblical imagery, from the Old and New Testament, as well as other religious images. Most recently, portraits of notable apostles have been found.

== Recent artwork discoveries ==
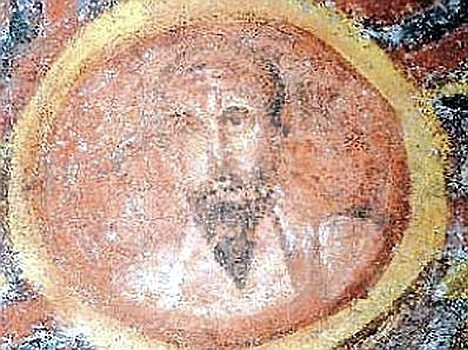
Paul the Apostle – Catacombs of St. Tecla, c. 380 C.E.

In 2008 (and up until 2010), under the auspices of the Pontifical Commission for Sacred Archaeology, a team led by Barbara Mazzei used laser technology to remove the calcium build-up on the walls of the catacomb. The task was successful and the artwork was exposed, vivid pictures against a backdrop of colours commonly used during the imperial age: red and black. More biblical imagery was revealed, including a portrait of Jesus and the twelve disciples. Portraits of several apostles were revealed too, who appeared to be Peter, John, Andrew, and Paul. These are rendered as the earliest portraits of the apostles. There was also a fresco with a woman at the centre, presumably the buried Thecla.

== Legend of Saint Thecla ==
Saint Thecla was a woman from Iconium, Asia Minor, living in the mid-first century. She was betrothed to a nobleman but, upon hearing the Apostle Paul preach, she converted to Christianity, left her family, and followed him. Thecla, inspired by Paul's discourse on the virtues of chastity, wanted to remain a virgin, angering both her mother and her suitor. Soon after followed a series of arrests, death sentences and attempts to kill her, all of which she survived. Her cult following grew and spread around the Mediterranean world, reaching Rome as well. One rendering of the legend has Thecla travelling to Rome to see the Apostle Paul, who was later put to death in the city. It is unclear whether she died here or in Asia Minor, but it is clear that she had followers in Rome. Since the catacomb was built sometime after the saint's death, then it is possible that her remains were later brought to the current site from either within Rome, or even as far as Seleucia in Asia Minor. However, if the occupant of the tomb is not the Saint Thecla, then it was a Roman woman of the same name.

== Notes ==
- Ambrosio, Alicia. "Underground Rome." 25 June 2010. Underground Rome | Salt and Light Catholic Media Foundation
- Cooper, Kate. "A Saint in Exile: The Early Medieval Thecla at Rome and Meriamlik." Hagiographica 2 (1995). 1–23.
- Davis, Stephen J. The Cult of Saint Thecla: A Tradition of Women's Piety in Late Antiquity. Oxford: Oxford University Press, 2001.
- Kington, Tom. "Apostle Images From 4th Century Found Under Street in Italy." 22 June 2010. Apostle images from 4th century found under street in Italy
