= Portuense =

Coordinates: 41.8552387°N 12.452901°E

- Quartiere of Rome
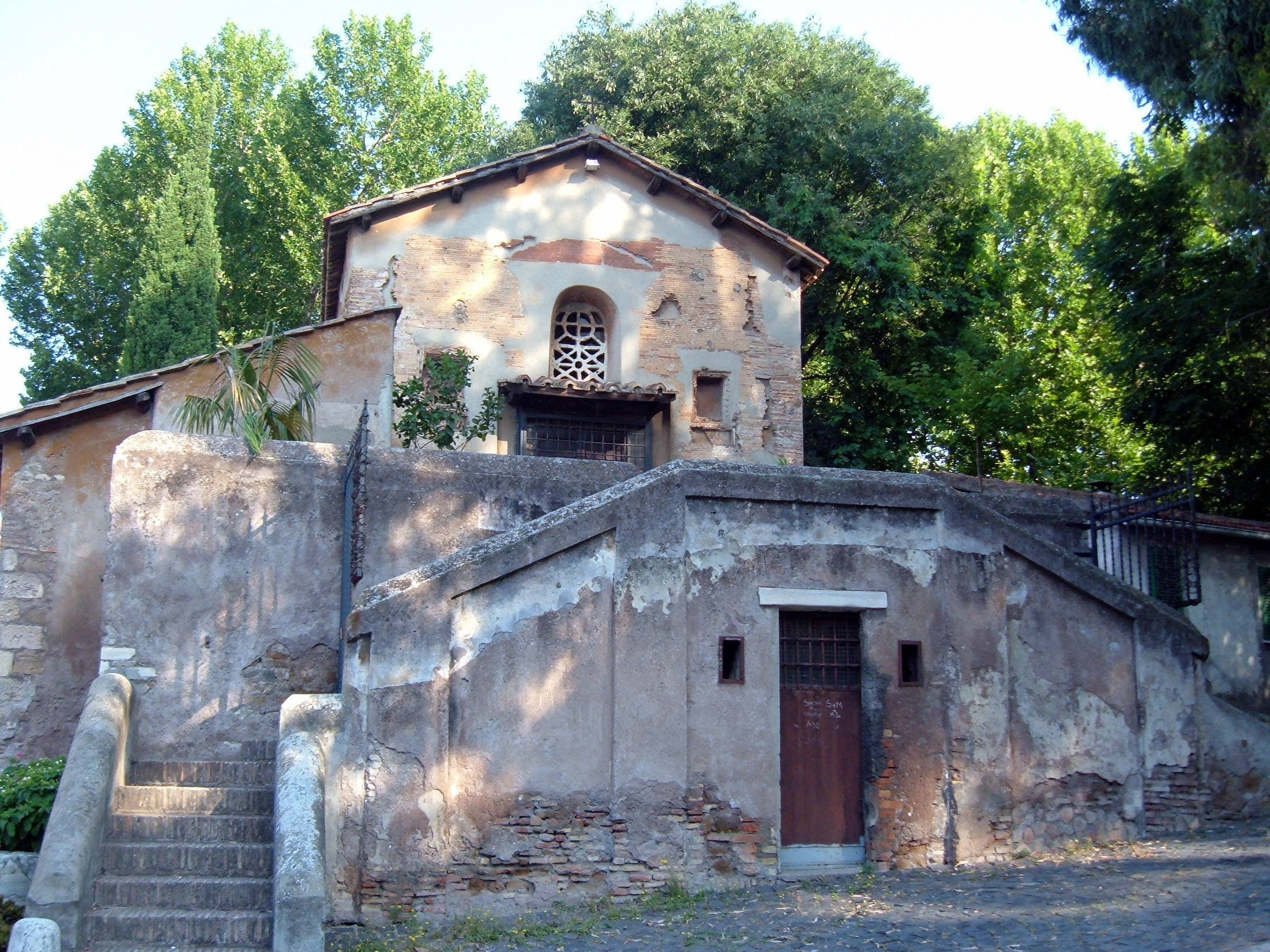
- The church of Santa Passera

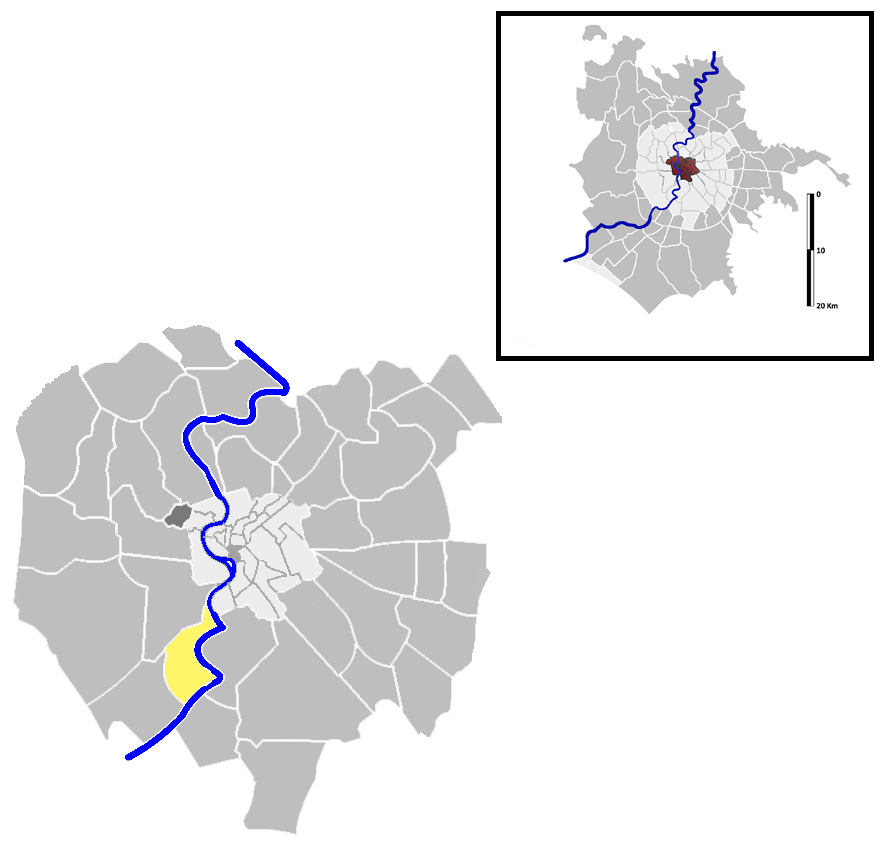
- Position of the quartiere within the city
- Country: Italy
- Region: Lazio
- Province: Rome
- Comune: Rome

Area
  - Total: 1.9026 sq mi (4.9278 km^{2})

Population (2016)
  - Total: 83,159
  - Density: 43,707.3/sq mi (16,875.48/km^{2})
- Time zone: UTC+1 (CET)
  - Summer (DST): UTC+2 (CEST)

Portuense is the 11th quartiere of Rome (Italy), identified by the initials Q.XI.

The toponym is also used to indicate the urbanistic area 15b, in the Municipio XV. The population of the urbanistic area amounts to 30.362 inhabitants.

There is also a suburbio (suburb) with the same name, identified by the initials S.VII.

== History ==
Portuense is one of the first 15 Quartieri born in 1911 and officially established in 1921. It took its name from the ancient Via Portuense.

== Geography ==
The quartiere is in the southern area of the town, close to the Aurelian Walls and to the river Tiber.

The territory of Portuense includes the urban zones 15B Ostiense and 15C Pian Due Torri, a great portion of the urban zone 16A Marconi as well as a little part of the urban zone 16D Gianicolense.

=== Boundaries ===
To the north, Portuense borders with Rione Trastevere (R. XIII), whose border is shortly marked by Piazza di Porta Portese. It also borders with Rione Testaccio (R.XX), from which is separated by the stretch of the Tiber between Ponte Testaccio and Ponte dell'Industria.

Eastward, the quartiere borders with Ostiense (Q.X) and with Europa (Q.XXXII), from which is separated by the stretch of the Tiber between Ponte dell'Industria and the Magliana Viaduct.

To the south-west, it borders with Suburbio Portuense (S. VII), whose border is marked by the Magliana Viaduct, by a short stretch of the Autostrada Roma-Fiumicino, by Via Salvatore Satta, Largo Giuseppe Petrelli, Via dell'Imbrecciato, Via Bolgheri, Via Riccardo Lombardi, and by another stretch of Via dell'Imbrecciato up to Via Portuense.

Westward, Portuense borders with Quartiere Gianicolense (Q.XII), whose boundary is defined by Via Portuense, Via Ettore Rolli and by another stretch of Via Portuense.

=== Local geography ===
Main roads and squares of the quartiere are:

- Via della Magliana, connecting Portuense to the neighborhood of Magliana, which is comprised in Suburbio Portuense;
- Viale Guglielmo Marconi, a huge thoroughfare which connects the district to Quartiere Ostiense and to Via Cristoforo Colombo;
- Piazza della Radio, at the end of Viale Guglielmo Marconi;
- Piazza Antonio Meucci, a rectangular square with a garden and a playground in the middle;
- Piazza Fabrizio De André.

Streets and squares are mostly named after inventors, scientists and politicians, particularly Mayors of Rome. Local toponyms can be categorized as follows:

- Mayors of Rome, e.g. Augusto Armellini, Prospero Colonna, Francesco Crispigni, Andrea Doria Pamphilj, Ernesto Nathan, Leopoldo Ruspoli, Giannetto Valli, Pietro Venturi;
- Patriots, e.g. Pasquale Baffi, Antonio Fratti, Pietro Frattini, Giuseppe Guerzoni, Nicola Laurantoni, Augusto Lorenzini, Pietro Maroncelli, Ernesto Teodoro Moneta, Giuseppe Sirtori, Vincenzo Statella;
- Politicians, e.g. Lenin, Riccardo Lombardi, Errico Malatesta, Agostino Novella;
- Scientists, engineers and inventors, e.g. Amedeo Avogadro, Eugenio Barsanti, Angelo Bellani, Gerolamo Cardano, Nicola Cavalieri, Bartolomeo Cristofori, Alessandro Cruto, Albert Einstein, Enrico Fermi, Stefano Longanesi, Guglielmo Mengarini, Antonio Pacinotti, Pietro Paleocapa, Giuseppe Peano, Piero Puricelli, Augusto Righi, Ascanio Sobrero;
- Towns in Tuscany, e.g. Bagni di Lucca, Certaldo, Collodi, Lari, Pescaglia, Prato, Scarperia, Sesto Fiorentino, Vaiano, Vicopisano.

== Places of interest ==
=== Churches ===
- Santa Passera
- Santi Aquila e Priscilla
- Santa Silvia

=== Parks ===
- Villa Bonelli

== Bibliography ==
- Rendina, Claudio; Paradisi, Donatella (2004). Le strade di Roma. 1st Volume A-D. Rome: Newton Compton Editori. ISBN 88-541-0208-3.
- Quercioli, Mauro (1997). I quartieri di Roma. Rome: Newton & Compton. ISBN 88-8183-639-4.
- Carlo Pietrangeli, Insegne e stemmi dei rioni di Roma in «Capitolium», n. 6, 1953 (XXVIII)
