= Autostrada A91 (Italy) =

Controlled-access highway in Italy

Autostrada A91
- Autostrada Roma-Fiumicino; Roma-Fiumicino motorway

Route information
- Part of E80
- Maintained by ANAS
- Length: 18.5 km (11.5 mi)
- Existed: 1959–present

Major junctions
- East end: Rome
- GRA in Rome; A12 in Fiumicino
- West end: Fiumicino

Location
- Country: Italy
- Regions: Lazio

Highway system
- Roads in Italy; Autostrade; State; Regional; Provincial; Municipal
← A 90

The Autostrada A91, also called Autostrada Roma-Fiumicino ("Roma-Fiumicino motorway"), is an autostrada (Italian for "motorway") 18.5 kilometres (11.5 mi) long in Italy located in the region of Lazio which connects Rome to the Leonardo da Vinci–Fiumicino Airport in Fiumicino. It is a part of the E80 European route.

The official "A91" name was assigned in the early 2000s. On many road signs along the route, the characteristic green octagonal marker of the Italian motorways still bears the letter A without number.

== History ==
The motorway was built by its current operator ANAS and finished in 1959 at the same time as the entry into service of the Airport itself (which took place in different phases between 1956 and January 1961). It was initially classified as a Strada Statale ("State highway"), with the name Strada statale 201 dell'Aeroporto di Fiumicino, and became a motorway in 1969.

On the occasion of the Great Jubilee of 2000, the motorway was enlarged with the construction of the third lane between the Grande Raccordo Anulare and the Airport, with the exception of a small stretch of approximately 4 kilometres (2.5 mi) towards Rome. Orange light lamps with red LEDs on the sides of the motorway were also installed to increase visibility.

In May 2010 a coplanar roadway was completed, to create connections with the commercial areas which had developed meanwhile in the adjacent areas, such as Parco Leonardo or the new Fiera di Roma.

== Toll ==
The 2011 Finance Act introduced a direct toll on the motorways and highways managed directly by ANAS, to reduce the service charge due by the State to the company for the management and maintenance of the road network.

The Act provided the introduction of the new toll system no later than December 2011; according to an attached technical report, it was supposed to be a "free flow" or electronic toll instead of traditional gates. Pending the completion of the connected infrastructures (cameras, control room etc.), the toll was temporarily increased (1 euro for cars and 2 euro for heavy vehicles) at the junction with the Autostrada A12 (Maccarese-Fregene) and at the Autostrada A12 Rome West barrier. These temporary flat-rate increases were subsequently eliminated, starting from 4 August 2010, following some appeals lodged by local authorities to the Lazio and Piedmont Regional Administrative Courts (TAR), as well as a Decree of the Council of State: in fact, at the junctions and barriers where toll payment was required, users who did not continue on the motorways would also had to pay for their use, while, according to the judges, the toll cannot be a tax but the payment for the actual use of a service.

== Route ==
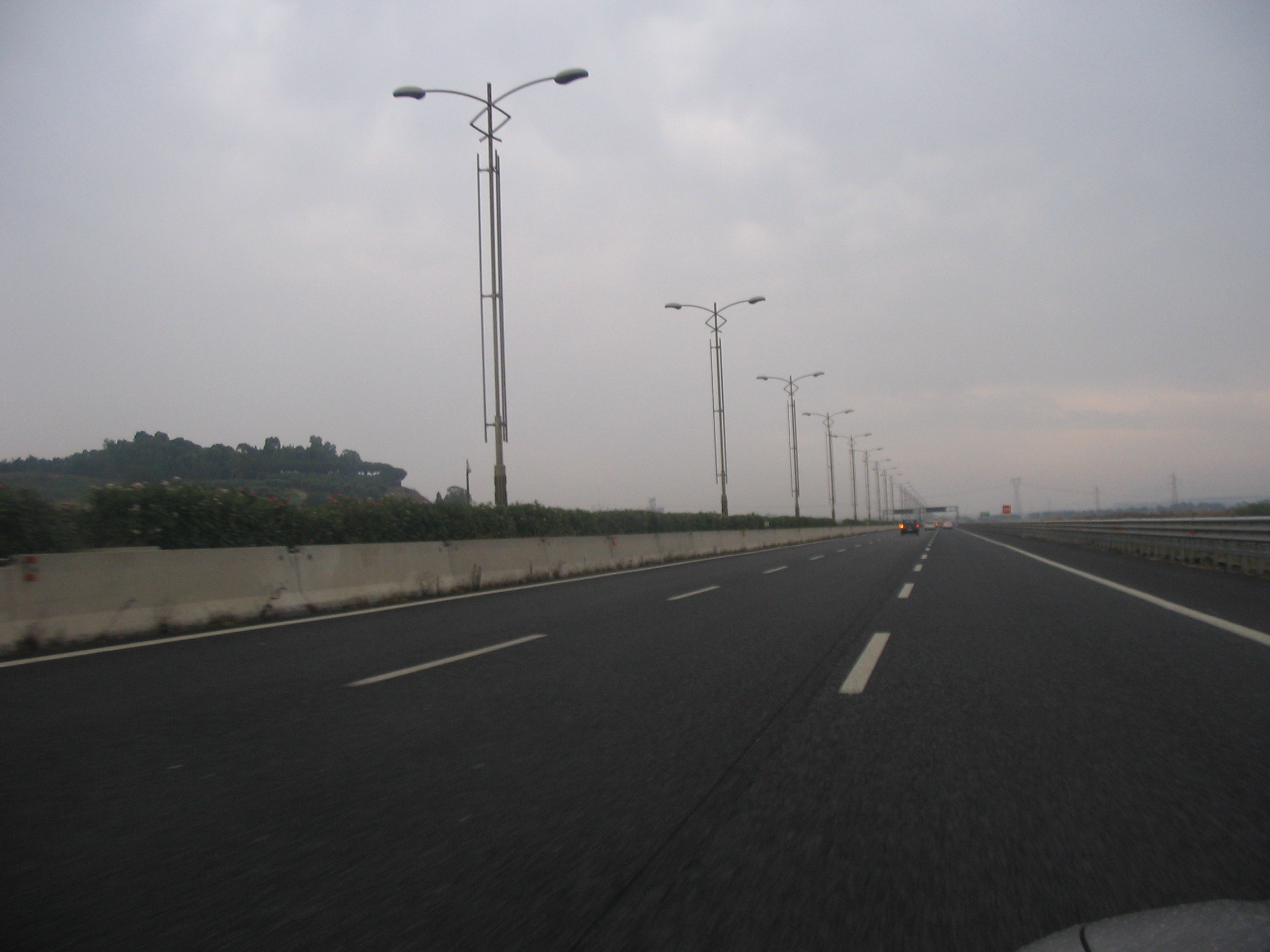
The Autostrada A91.

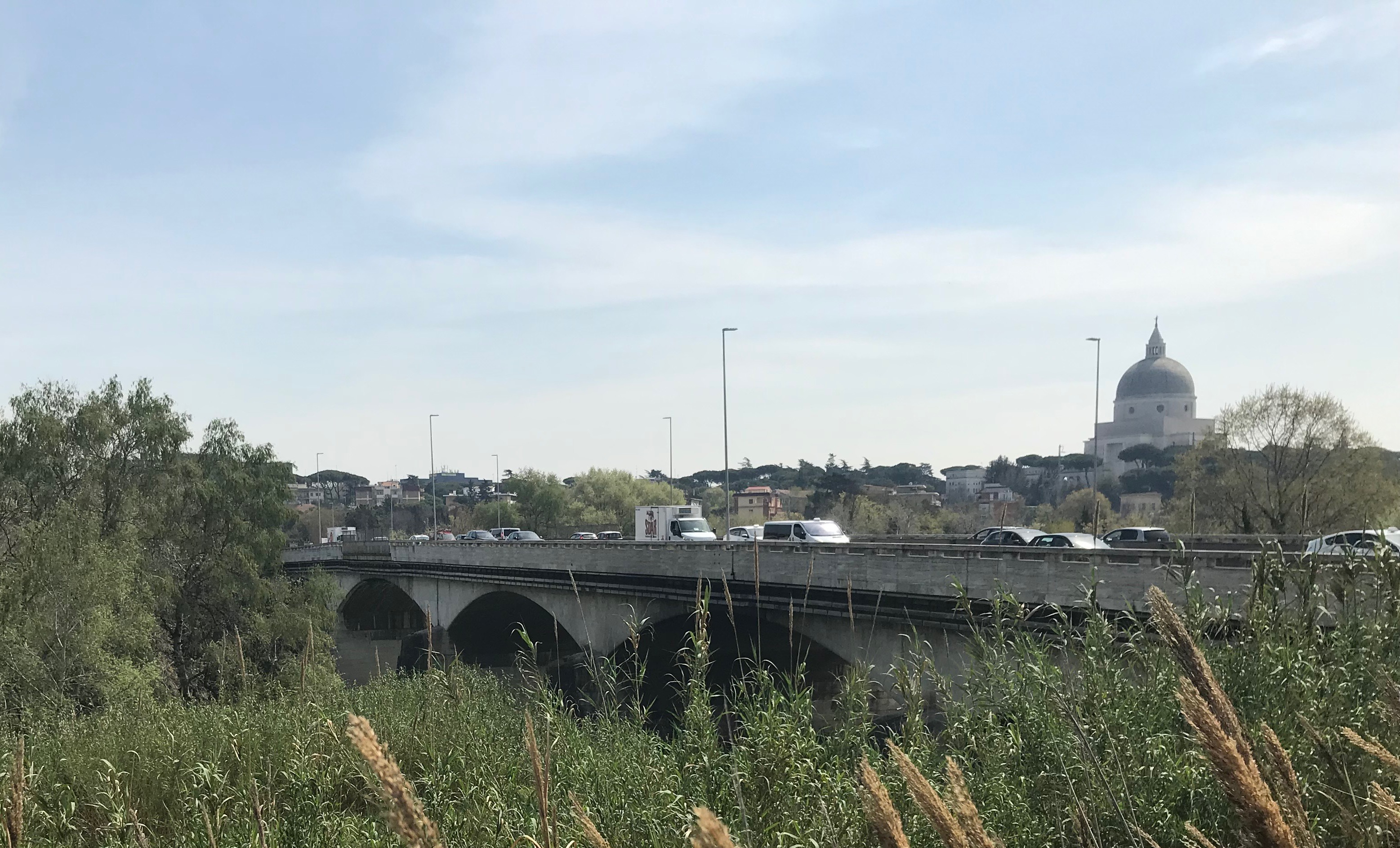
The Magliana bridge on the Autostrada A91.

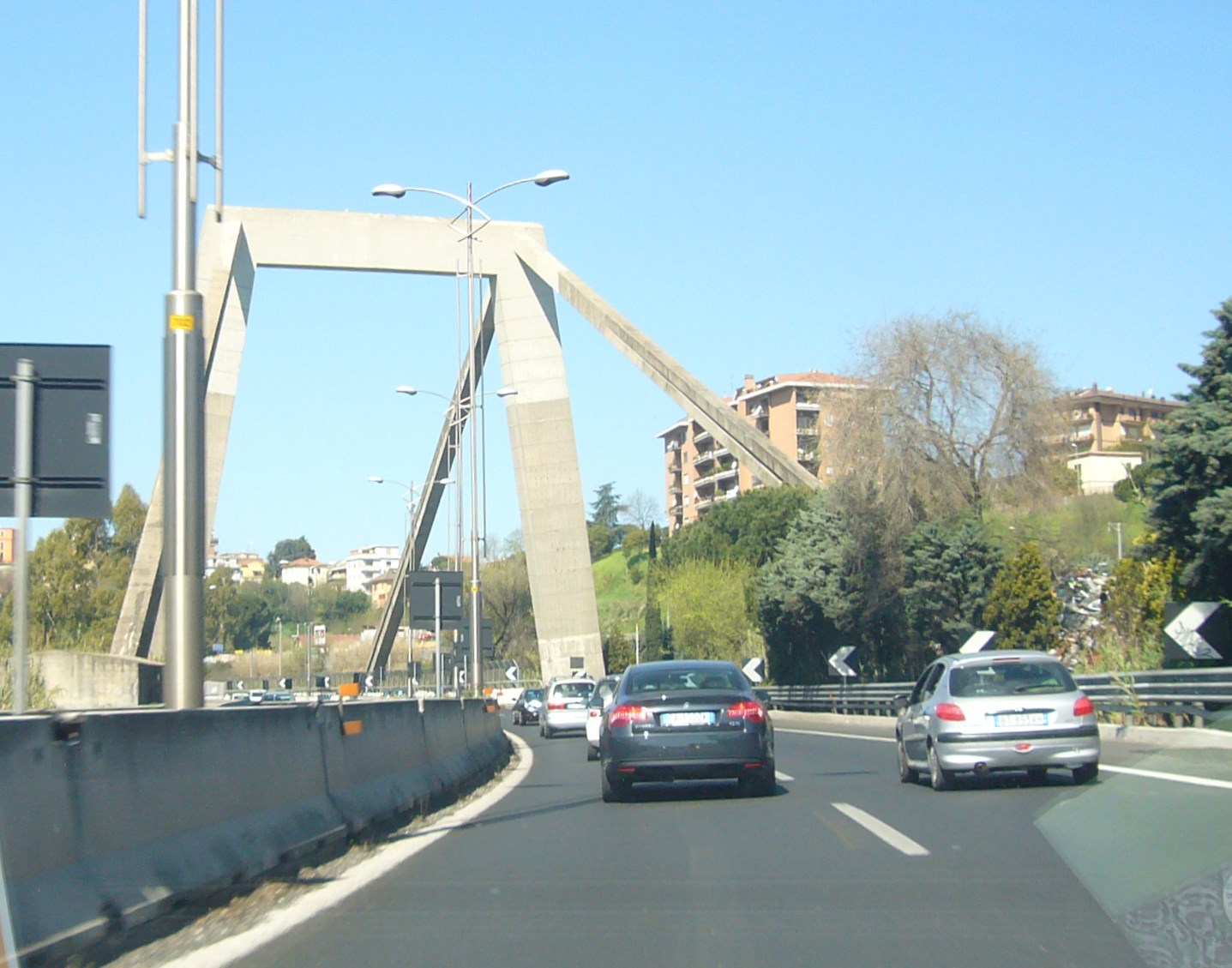
The Morandi viaduct on the Autostrada A91.

The motorway is 18.5 kilometres (11.5 mi) long; the stretch from the airport to the junction with the Grande Raccordo Anulare is 11.9 kilometres (7.4 mi) long. The motorway is mainly a straight path, except for a curved stretch along a bend of the Tiber (within the Magliana urban zone, in the Portuense neighborhood) and three wide curves along the Viaduct of the Magliana, in the last stretch inside Rome (2.5 kilometres (1.6 mi)).

A91, along with Autostrada A24, is the only motorway in Rome which penetrates the city within the Grande Raccordo Anulare.

ROMA – FIUMICINO
Exit	↓km↓	↑km↑	Province	European Route
Via Laurentina	0.0 km (0 mi)	18.5 km (11.5 mi)	RM	E80
Via Cristoforo Colombo	0.6 km (0.37 mi)	17.9 km (11.1 mi)	RM	E80
Via della Magliana	2.6 km (1.6 mi)	15.9 km (9.9 mi)	RM	E80
Via Isacco Newton	3.1 km (1.9 mi)	15.4 km (9.6 mi)	RM	E80
Parco de' Medici	6.5 km (4.0 mi)	12.5 km (7.8 mi)	RM	E80
Grande Raccordo Anulare	6.6 km (4.1 mi)	11.9 km (7.4 mi)	RM	E80
Ponte Galeria – Nuova Fiera di Roma	12.4 km (7.7 mi)	6.1 km (3.8 mi)	RM	E80
Civitavecchia	14.3 km (8.9 mi)	4.2 km (2.6 mi)	RM	E80
Parco Leonardo/Via Portuense	14.8 km (9.2 mi)	3.7 km (2.3 mi)	RM	E80
Leonardo da Vinci–Fiumicino Airport	18.5 km (11.5 mi)	0.0 km (0 mi)	RM	E80

== See also ==
- Autostrade of Italy
- Roads in Italy
- Transport in Italy

=== Other Italian roads ===
- State highways (Italy)
- Regional road (Italy)
- Provincial road (Italy)
- Municipal road (Italy)
