= Ponte della Magliana =

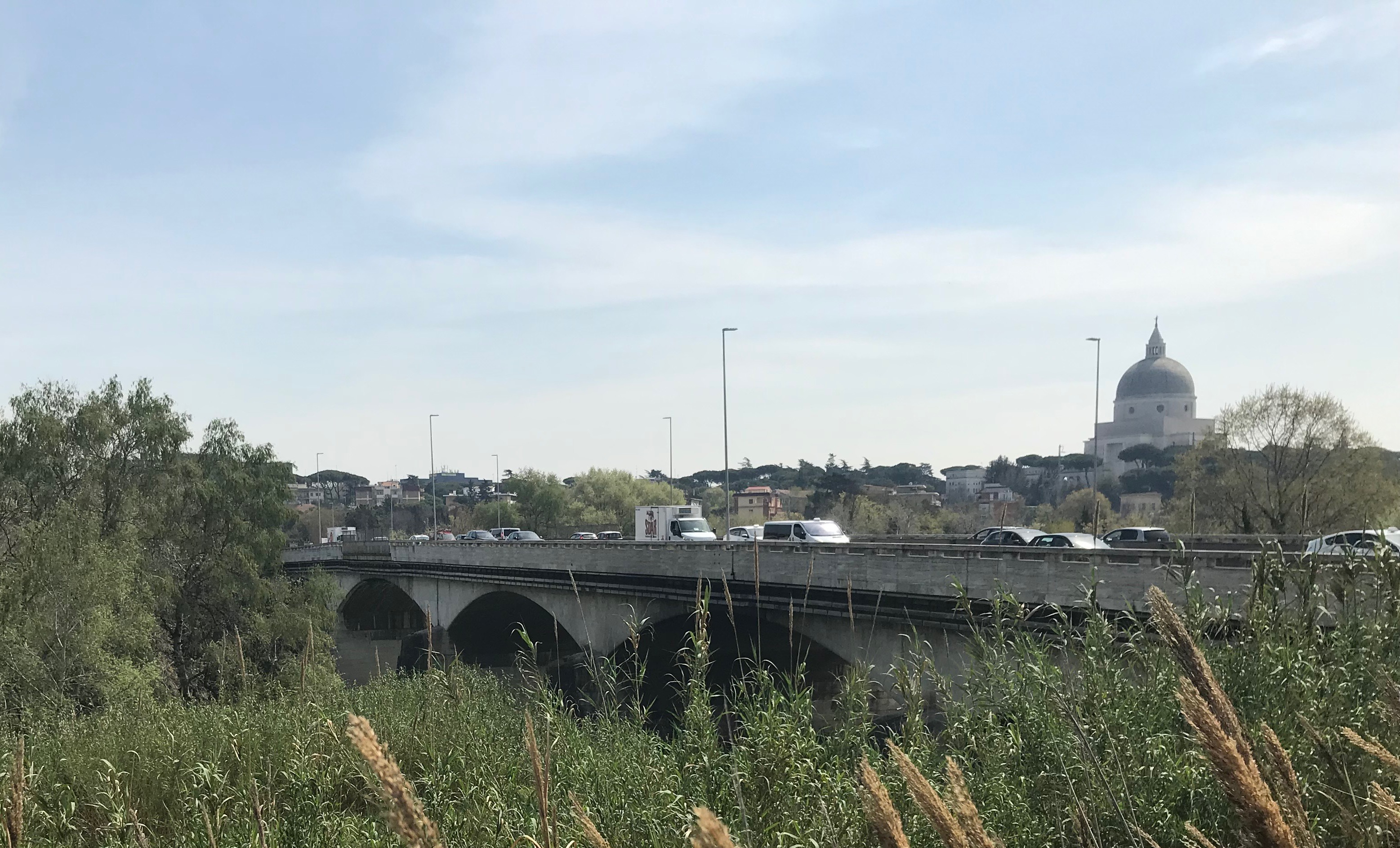
- Ponte della Magliana with the dome of Santi Pietro e Paolo in the background
- Coordinates: 41°50′22″N 12°27′29″E
- Crosses: Tiber
- Locale: Rome, Q.X Ostiense and Q.IX Portuense, Italy

Characteristics
- Material: Reinforced concrete, travertine
- Total length: 223.62 m (733.7 ft)
- Width: 19.25 m (63.2 ft)

History
- Designer: Romolo Raffaelli
- Construction start: 1930
- Construction end: 1948
- Opened: 1948

Ponte della Magliana is a motorway bridge in Rome (Italy). It crosses the Tiber between Pian due Torri (right bank) and Via del Cappellaccio (left bank), linking the Quartieri Portuense and Ostiense, respectively, on the right and on the left of the river.

It is currently part of a larger viaduct, which continues on the right bank of the Tiber towards the Colli Portuensi urban zone and the highway to the Fiumicino Airport and on the left one towards the EUR district, the Tre Fontane urban zone and Via Laurentina.

== Description ==
The bridge is built in reinforced concrete covered with travertine; it has seven arches and a total length of about 223.62 m (733.7 ft).

== History ==
The bridge was designed in 1930 by Romolo Raffaelli as the western entrance to the area of the 1942 World Exposition of Rome (never held), now the EUR district. The works slowed down after the entry of Italy into World War II (1940); later, in the days immediately following the proclamation of the armistice (8 September 1943), the yard suffered the destruction of the Centrings by the German troops. The construction was resumed in 1945 and was completed in 1948.

In 1976, a technical report commissioned by the Municipality of Rome revealed an "unacceptable" deterioration of some structural elements of the bridge.

In 2018, civil engineers said that it suffered "serious structural flaws" and was in danger of "falling down".

The project of 2001 for the construction of the nearby Ponte dei Congressi included, among other things, the definitive closure to traffic of the Magliana bridge. This project was abandoned for a few years and then re-emerged, starting from 2015, within the town plan for the construction of the new stadium of the A.S. Roma in Tor di Valle: in this circumstance, however, the hypothesis was made to maintain the traffic on the Magliana bridge, although in one direction only.

In December 2017, a new report presented by Remo Calzona during a conference at the University "La Sapienza" denounced the impossibility of restoring the building because of its advanced state of decay and urgently wished for it to be "taken out of service" to protect citizens' safety.

Starting in August 2018, the Municipality of Rome began a series of renovation works, narrowing the carriageways without interrupting traffic, except for the initial preparation of the building sites.

== Transports ==
- Metro stop (EUR Magliana, line B)

== Sources ==
- Rendina, Claudio (2005). Enciclopedia di Roma. Roma: Newton Compton Editori. ISBN 88-541-0304-7.
