= Ostiense =

Coordinates: 41.863651°N 12.478911°E

- Quartiere of Rome
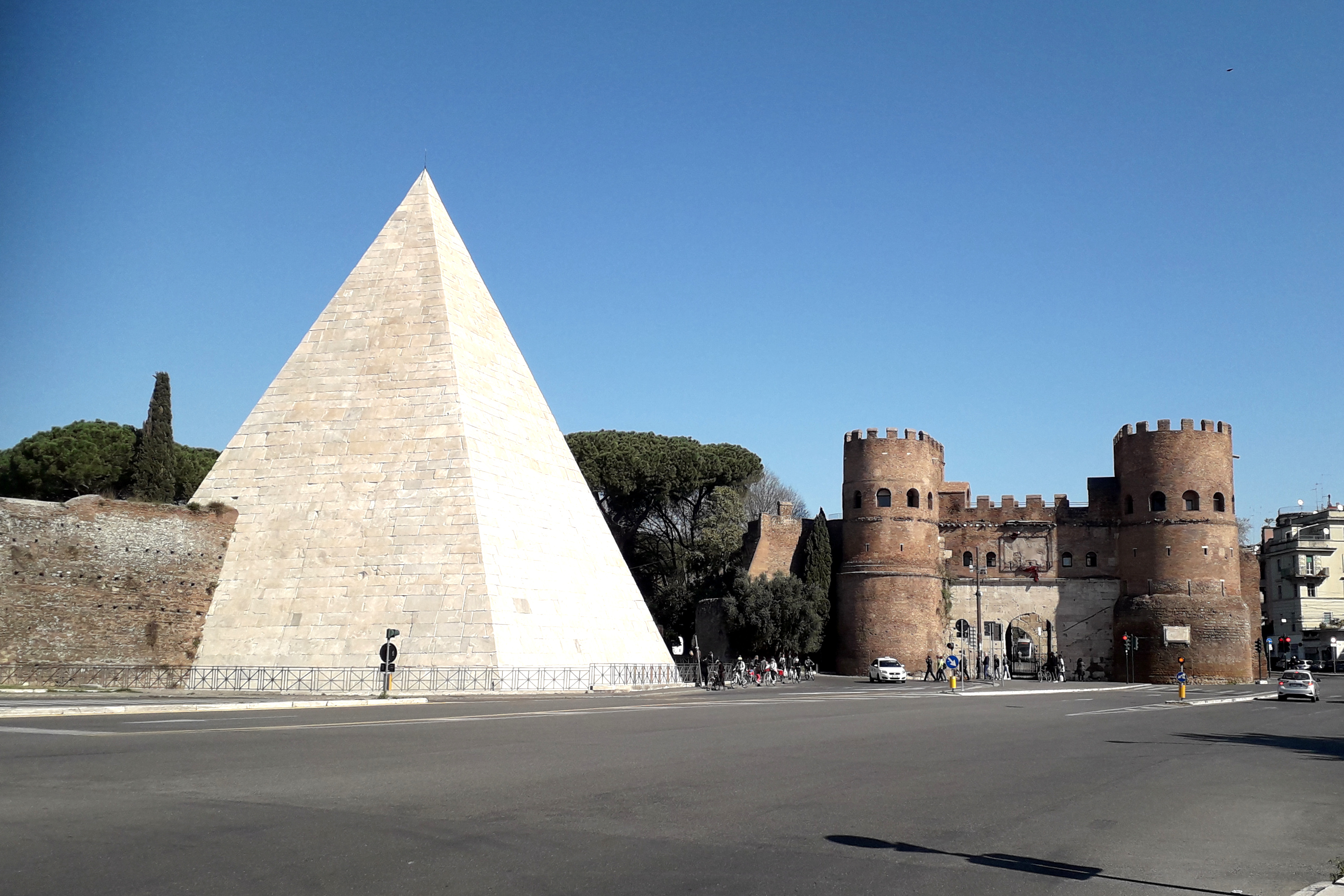
- Piazzale Ostiense, with the Piramide Cestia and Porta San Paolo

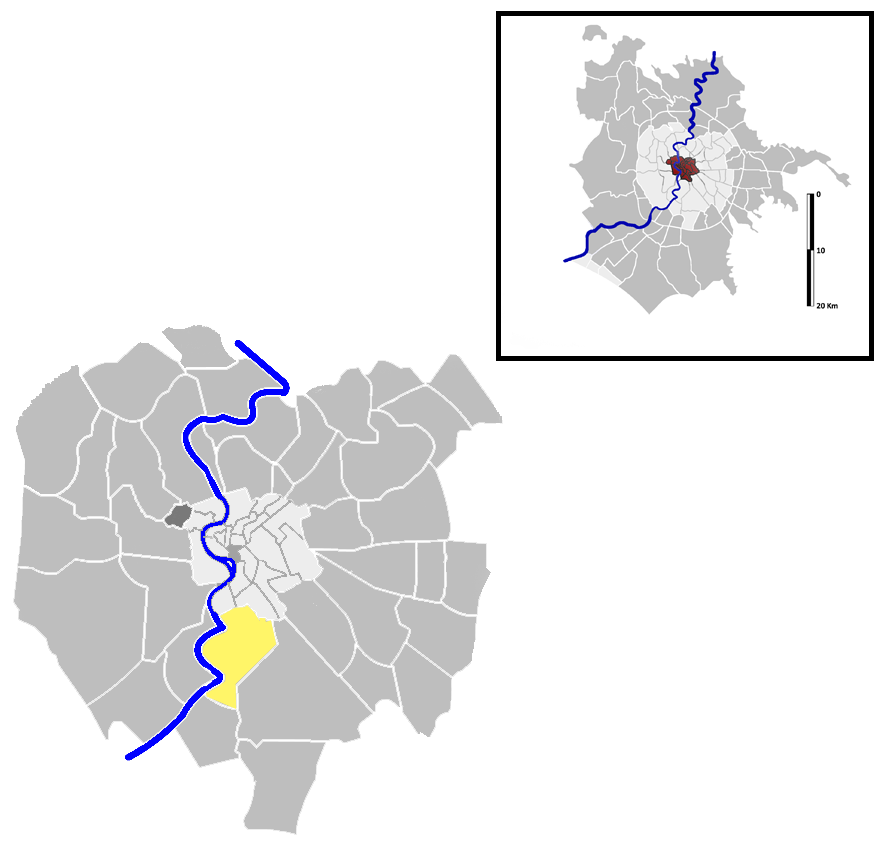
- Position of the quartiere within the city
- Country: Italy
- Region: Lazio
- Province: Rome
- Comune: Rome

Area
  - Land: 2.7502 sq mi (7.1231 km^{2})

Population (2016)
  - Total: 62,339
  - Density: 22,666.7/sq mi (8,751.67/km^{2})
- Time zone: UTC+1 (CET)
  - Summer (DST): UTC+2 (CEST)

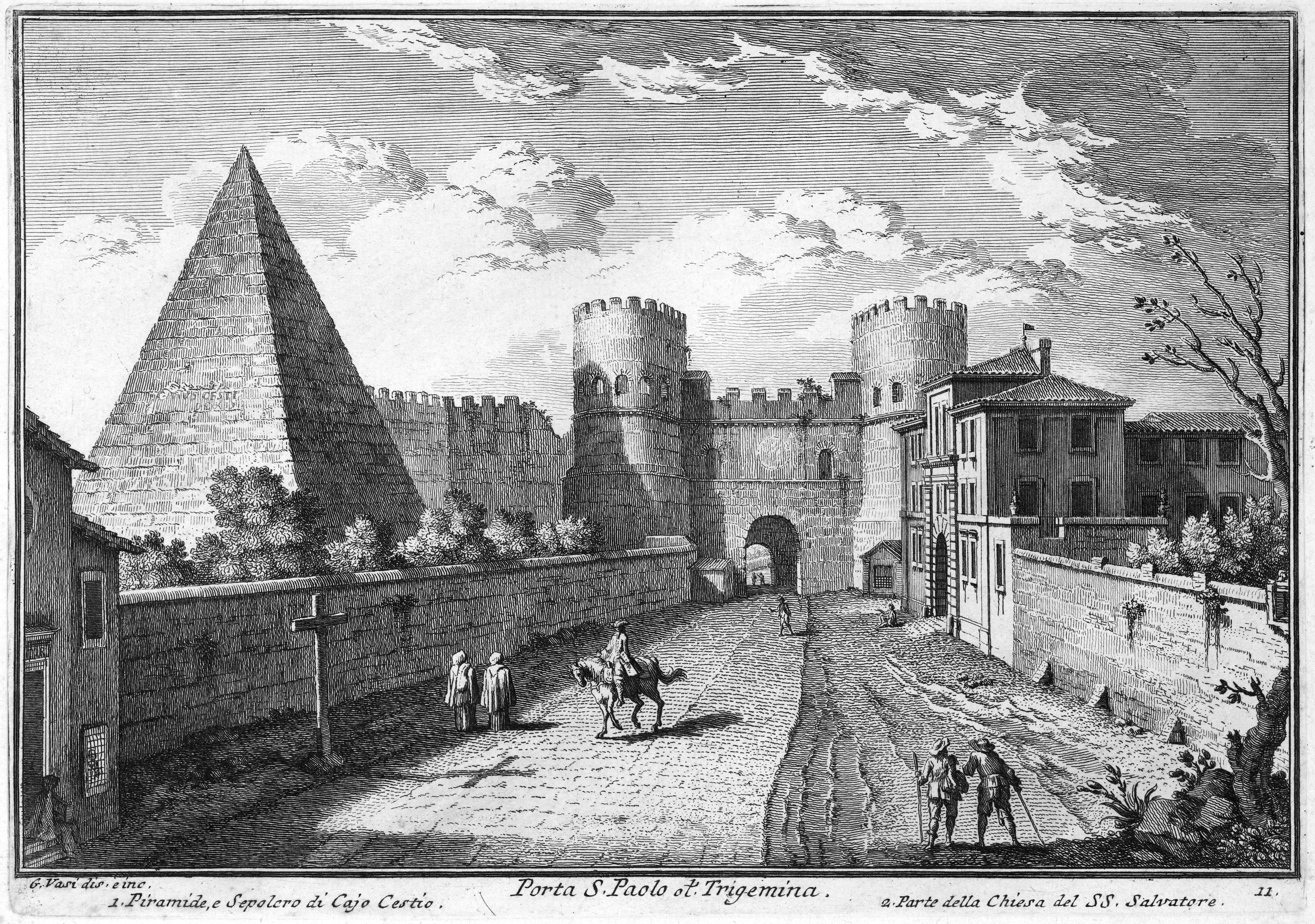
Giuseppe Vasi 18th century etching of Porta Ostiensis (now called Porta San Paolo) in the original city walls of Rome, and the Pyramid of Cestius to the left.

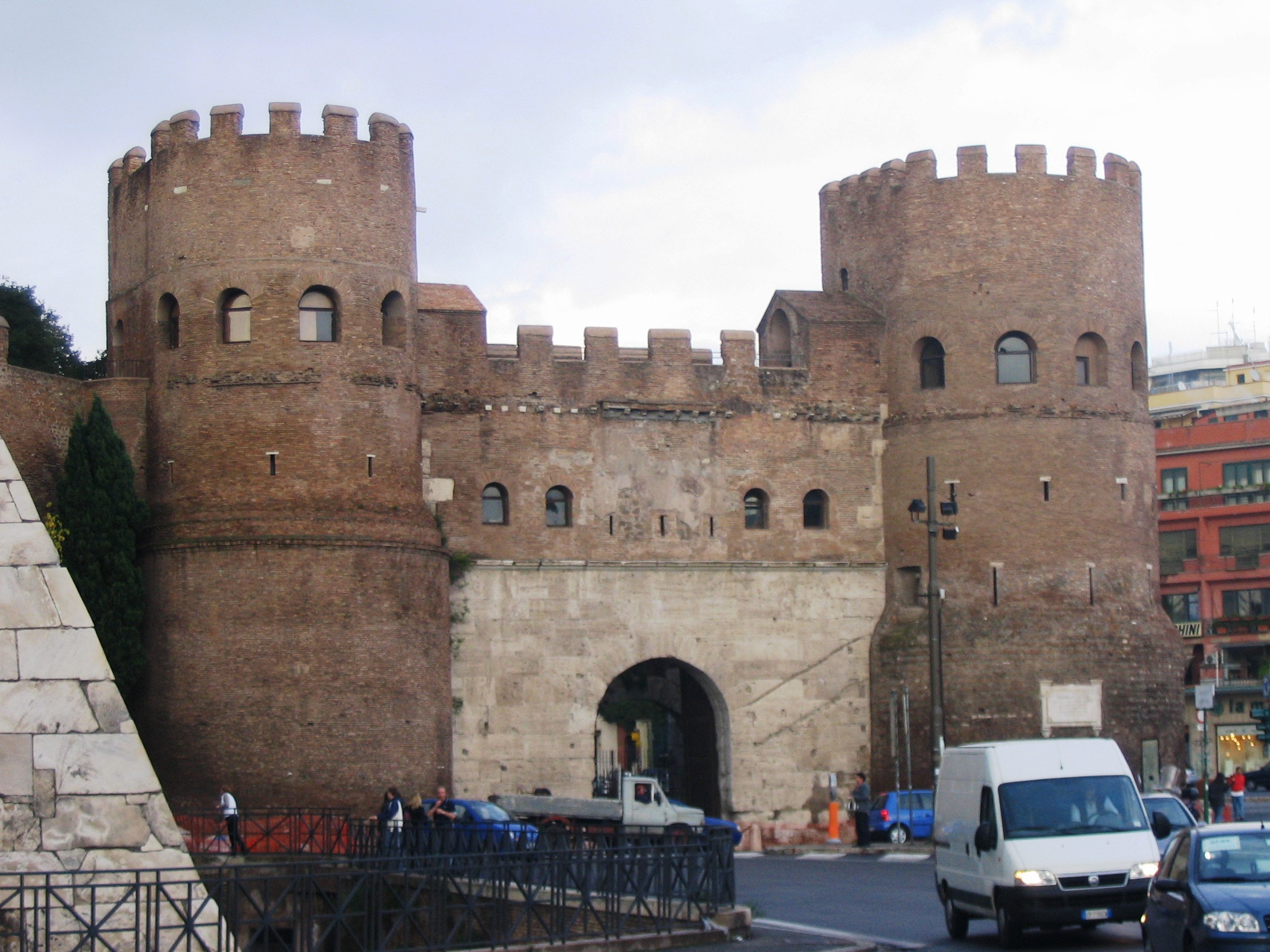
Porta Ostiensis today, the location of Ostiense Museum.

Ostiense is the 10th quartiere of Rome, identified by the initials Q. X.

The toponym comes from the original name of the Porta San Paolo, a gate in the city walls of Rome, was Porta Ostiensis, because it was located at the beginning of Via Ostiense. It now houses the Via Ostiense Museum.

== History ==
In the late 9th century, a fortified settlement developed around the Basilica of Saint Paul Outside the Walls: the village took the name of Giovannipoli after Pope John VIII, who built it for defense purposes after a Saracen raid.

Ostiense is amongst the first 15 quartieri that sprung in 1911 and were officially established in 1921. It began to sprawl in 1907, after the mayor Ernesto Nathan promoted the creation of an industrial area at the beginning of the Via Ostiense; then, after the 1909 town plan was approved, a fluvial harbour, the Mercati Generali, a prominent gasometer and the Centrale Montemartini (a former power station now housing part of the Capitoline Museum's collection of classical sculpture) were built.

The landmarks in the quarter include the Centrale Montemartini and the Basilica of Saint Paul Outside the Walls.

Other landmarks include the Roma Ostiense railway station and most of the University of Rome III campus.

The railway station is home to the Italian railway company Nuovo Trasporto Viaggiatori. It is the city's main hub and home to Italian food market chain Eataly, world's biggest store.

== Geography ==
The quartiere is positioned in the south metropolitan area of Rome, close to the left bank of the Tiber.

It comprises the area near the Via Ostiense from the Porta San Paolo to the Magliana Viaduct. The neighborhood of Garbatella is comprised within its official borders.

The territory of the quarter includes the urban zone 11A Ostiense of the Municipio VIII.

=== Boundaries ===
The quartiere borders, to the north, with Rione Testaccio (R. XX), from which is separated by the stretch of the Aurelian Walls between the river Tiber and Porta San Paolo, and with Rione San Saba (R. XXI), from which is separated by the stretch of the Aurelian Walls between the said Porta San Paolo and Porta Ardeatina.

Eastward, the quartiere shares a border with Quartiere Ardeatino (Q. XX), whose boundary is outlined by a portion of Via Cristoforo Colombo, between Via di Porta Ardeatina and Via Laurentina, and by a stretch of Via Laurentina itself, between Via Cristoforo Colombo and Via delle Tre Fontane.

Southward, Ostiense borders with Quartiere Europa (Q. XXXII), from which is separated by Via delle Tre Fontane and by the Magliana Viaduct.

To the west, Ostiense borders with Quartiere Portuense (Q. XI), the border being marked by the stretch of the Tiber between the Magliana Viaduct and Ponte dell'Industria.

=== Local geography ===
The main roads and squares of Quartiere Ostiense are:

- Via Ostiense, which starts from Piazzale Ostiense and links the city to Ostia and the sea;
- Circonvallazione Ostiense, which crosses the Line B subway and links Via Ostiense to Via Cristoforo Colombo;
- Viale Leonardo da Vinci, a long artery parallel to Via Ostiense;
- Viale Guglielmo Marconi, that connects the borough to the nearby Quartiere Portuense;
- Largo delle Sette Chiese, with a monument to the Resistenza in the middle;
- Piazza Damiano Sauli, the center of the Garbatella neighborhood;
- Piazzale di San Paolo, flanking the same-name basilica and the vast park dedicated to Ildefonso Schuster.

The squares and the roads of the quartiere are chiefly named after explorers and missionaries. Local toponyms can be categorized as follows:

- Abbeys, e.g. Farfa, Fossanova, Gibilmanna, Nonantola, Oropa, Trisulti;
- Explorers and seamen, e.g. Giovanni Battista Belzoni, Vito Bering, Vittorio Bottego, Alvise Cadamosto, Federico Nansen, Antonio Pigafetta, Antoniotto Usodimare, Giovanni da Verrazzano;
- Missionaries, e.g. Geremia Bonomelli, Daniele Comboni, Giustino de Jacobis, Guglielmo Massaia, Ricoldo da Montecroce, Odorico da Pordenone;
- Naval engineers and entrepreneurs, e.g. Giovanni Ansaldo, Benedetto Brin, Alessandro Cialdi, Enrico Cravero, Vittorio Cuniberti, Giacinto Pullino, Giancarlo Vallauri;
- Notable women, e.g. Alessandra Macinghi Strozzi, Rosa Raimondi Garibaldi, Caterina Sforza, Anna Maria Taigi;
- Places related to Saint Paul, e.g. Corinto, Damasco, Efeso, Filippi, Tarso, Tessalonica;
- Playwrights, e.g. Luigi Antonelli, Silvio D'Amico, Ernesto Murolo, Ruzzante, Alessandro Varaldo;
- Roman emperors, e.g. Alessandro Severo, Antonino Pio, Costantino, Galba, Giustiniano, Teodosio, Tiberio, Tito, Valentiniano;
- Scientists, e.g. Ugo Amaldi, Temistocle Calzecchi Onesti, Filippo Eredia, Tullio Levi Civita, Macedonio Melloni, Umberto Nistri, Nicola Parravano, Salvatore Pincherle, Albert Sabin, Giuseppe Veratti, Vito Volterra.

== Places of interest ==
=== Churches ===
- Basilica of Saint Paul Outside the Walls
- San Benedetto
- San Francesco Saverio alla Garbatella
- Santa Galla
- San Filippo Neri in Eurosia
- Santi Isidoro ed Eurosia
- Santa Maria Regina degli Apostoli alla Montagnola

=== Archaeological sites ===
- Catacomb of Saint Thecla

=== Museums ===
- Centrale Montemartini
