= Cyrus and John =

Saints

Saints Cyrus and John
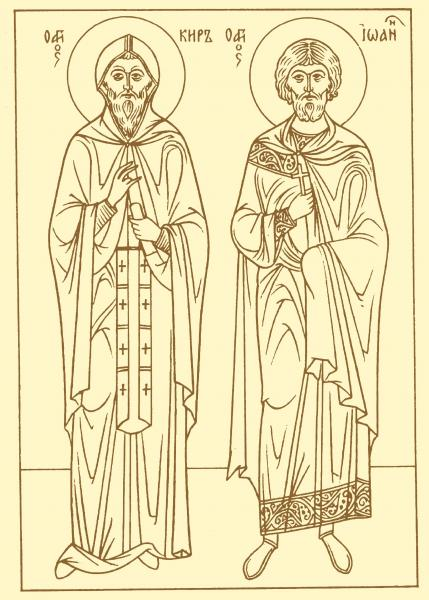
- Iconographic line drawing of Ss. Cyrus (left) and John

Wonderworkers, Unmercenary Physicians
- Born: c. 2nd century AD; Alexandria, Egypt, Roman Empire
- Died: c. 304 or 311; Abu Qir, Egypt
- Venerated in: Eastern Orthodox Church; Oriental Orthodox Church; Roman Catholic Church
- Major shrine: Saint Barbara Church in Coptic Cairo
- Feast: 31 January [O.S. 13 February] 28 June [O.S. 11 July] (translation of relics)
- Attributes: Cyrus is clothed in monastic habit, John is wearing court robes. They may be shown holding martyrs' crosses or medicine boxes and medicine spoons which terminate in crosses
- Patronage: Vico Equense

Saints Cyrus and John (Italian: Ciro e Giovanni; Arabic: أباكير ويوحنا, romanized: Abākīr wa-Yūḥannā; died c. 304 or 311 AD) are venerated as martyrs. They are especially venerated by the Coptic Church and surnamed Wonderworking Unmercenaries (thaumatourgoi anargyroi) because they healed the sick free of charge.

Their feast day is celebrated by the Copts on the sixth day of Tobi, corresponding to 31 January, the day also observed by the Eastern Orthodox Church; on the same day they are commemorated in the Roman Martyrology. The Eastern Orthodox Church also celebrate the finding and translation of their relics on 28 June.

== Life and historicity ==
The principal source of information regarding the life, passion and miracles of Sts. John and Cyrus is the encomium written by Sophronius, Patriarch of Jerusalem (d. 638). Of the birth, parents, and first years of the saints we know nothing. According to the Arabic "Synaxarium", compiled by Michael, Bishop of Athrib and Malig, Cyrus and John were both Alexandrians; this, however, is contradicted by other documents in which it is said that Cyrus was a native of Alexandria and John of Edessa.

== Cyrus ==
Cyrus practised the art of medicine, and had a workshop (ergasterium) which was afterwards transformed into a temple (church) dedicated to Shadrach, Meshach, and Abednego. He ministered to the sick gratis and at the same time laboured with all the ardour of an apostle of the Faith, and won many from pagan superstition. He would say, “Whoever wishes to avoid being ill should refrain from sin, for sin is often the cause of bodily illness.” This took place under the Emperor Diocletian. Denounced to the prefect of the city he fled to Arabia where he took refuge in a town near the sea called Tzoten. There, having received the tonsure and assumed the monastic habit, he abandoned medicine and began a life of asceticism.

== John ==
John belonged to the army, in which he held a high rank; the "Synaxarium" cited above adds that he was one of the familiars of the emperor. Hearing of the virtues and wonders of Cyrus, he went to Jerusalem in fulfillment of a vow, and thence passed to Alexandria and then to Arabia where he became the companion of St. Cyrus in the ascetic life.

== Martyrdom of Cyrus and John ==
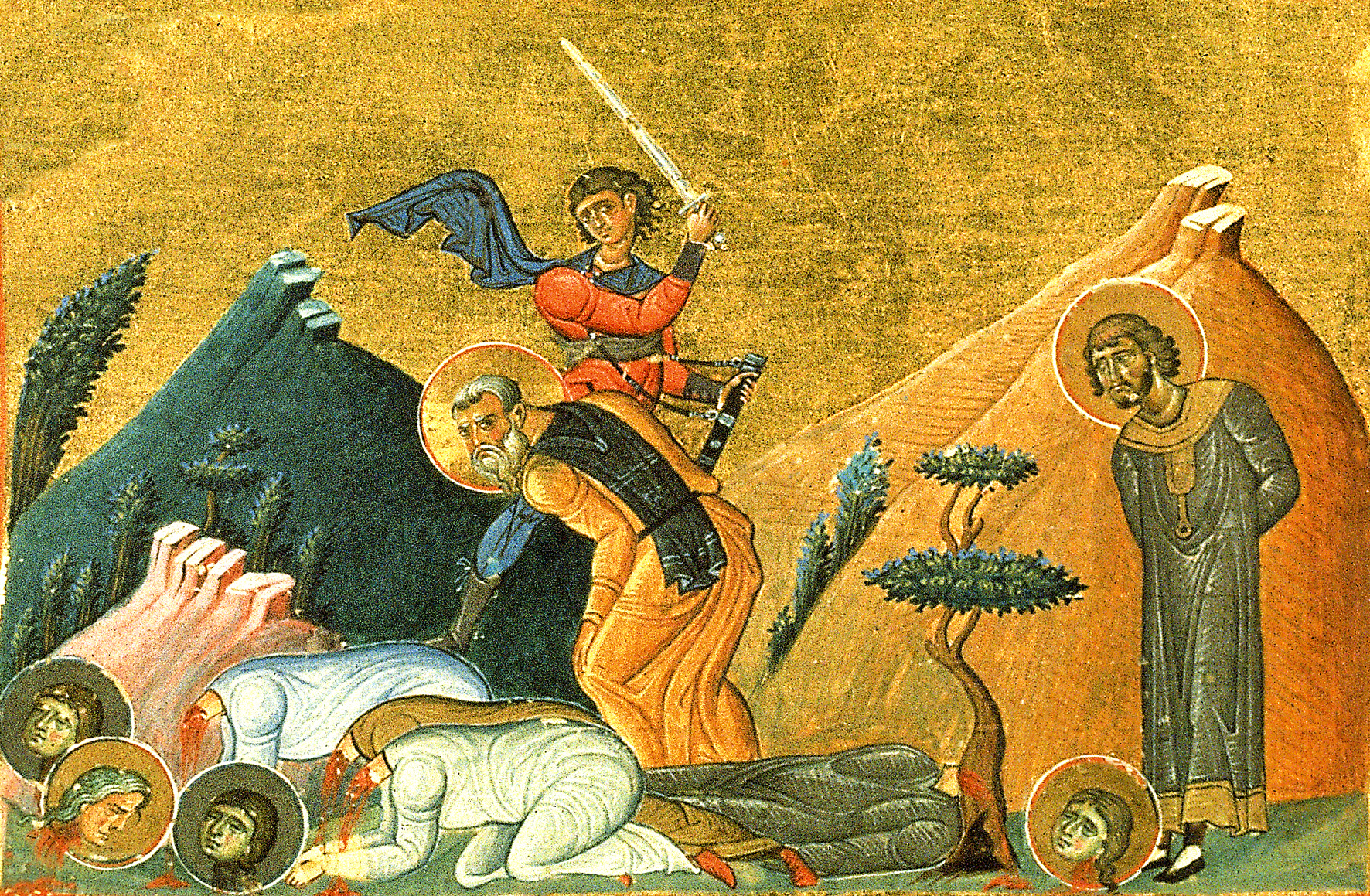
Miniature from the Menologion of Basil II

During the persecution of Diocletian three holy virgins, fifteen-year-old Theoctista (Theopista), Theodota (Theodora), thirteen years old, and Theodossia (Theodoxia), eleven years old, together with their mother Athanasia, were arrested at Canopus and brought to Alexandria. Cyrus and John, fearing lest these girls, on account of their youth, might, in the midst of torments, deny the Faith, resolved to go into the city to comfort them and encourage them in undergoing martyrdom. This fact becoming known they too were arrested and after dire torments they were all beheaded on 31 January.

== Veneration ==
The bodies of the two martyrs were placed in the church of St. Mark the Evangelist in Alexandria.

At the time of St. Cyril, Patriarch of Alexandria (412–444), there existed at Menuthis (Menouthes or Menouthis) near Canopus and present-day Abu Qir, a pagan temple reputed for its oracles and cures which attracted even some simple Christians of the vicinity. St. Cyril thought to extirpate this idolatrous cult by establishing in that town the cultus of Saints Cyrus and John. For this purpose he moved their relics (28 June, 414) and placed them in the church built by his predecessor, Theophilus, in honour of the Four Evangelists.

Before the finding and transfer of the relics by St. Cyril it seems that the names of the two saints were unknown; it is certain that no written records of them were known prior to then. In the fifth century, during the pontificate of Pope Innocent I, their relics were brought to Rome by two monks, Grimaldus and Arnulfus—this according to a manuscript in the archives of the deaconry of Santa Maria in Via Lata, cited by Antonio Bosio.

Cardinal Angelo Mai, however, for historical reasons, justly assigns a later date, namely 634, under Pope Honorius I and the Emperor Heraclius (Spicilegium Rom., III, V). The relics were placed in the suburban church of Santa Passera (a linguistic corruption of "Abbas Cyrus") on the Via Portuense. In the time of Bosio the pictures of the two saints were still visible in this church. Upon the door of the hypogeum, which still remains, is the following inscription in marble:

Corpora sancta Cyri renitent hic atque Joannis
Quæ quondam Romæ dedit Alexandria magna

Their tomb became a shrine and place of pilgrimage. In Coptic Cyrus' name became Apakiri, Apakyri, Apakyr; in Arabic, 'Abaqir, 'Abuqir. The city of Abu Qir, now a suburb of Alexandria, was named after him.

At Rome three churches were dedicated to these martyrs, Abbas Cyrus de Militiis, Abbas Cyrus de Valeriis, and Abbas Cyrus ad Elephantum — all of which were transformed afterwards by the vulgar pronunciation into S. Passera, a corruption of Abbas Cyrus.

In the Eastern Orthodox Church and those Eastern Catholic Churches which follow the Byzantine Rite, Cyrus and John are among the saints who are commemorated during the Liturgy of Preparation in the Divine Liturgy.
