= Ponte dell'Industria =

Bridge in Rome, Italy

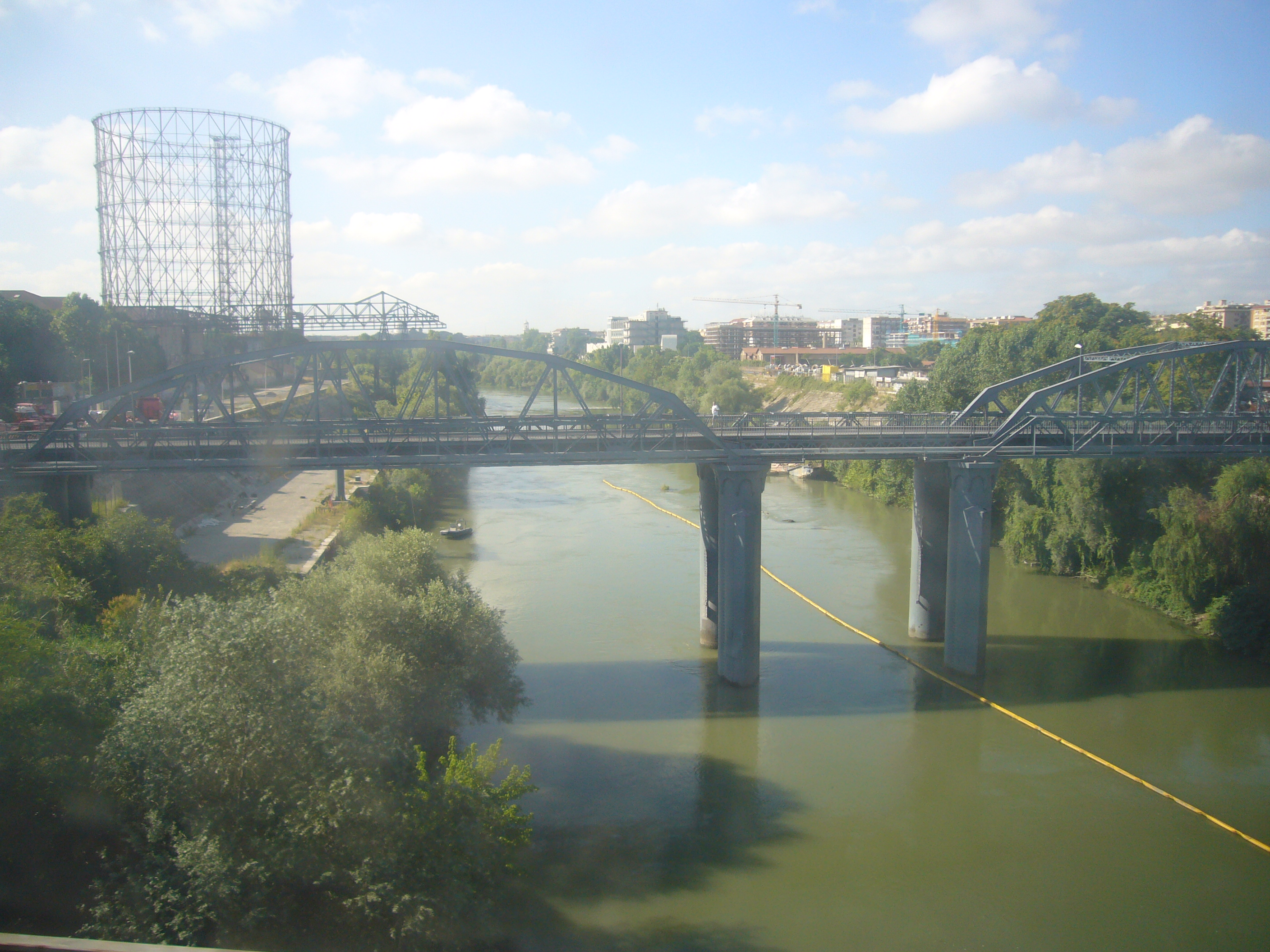
- Ponte dell'Industria, Rome
- Coordinates: 41°52′19″N 12°28′20″E
- Crosses: River Tiber
- Locale: Rome, Ostiense and Portuense districts, Italy

Characteristics
- Material: Metal
- Total length: 131.20 m (430.4 ft)
- Width: 7.25 m (23.8 ft)

History
- Construction start: 1862
- Construction end: 1863
- Opened: 1863

Ponte dell'Industria, also known as Ponte di ferro (English: iron bridge), is a bridge that connects via del Porto Fluviale to via Antonio Pacinotti, in Rome, in the neighborhoods Ostiense and Portuense.

== History ==
It was built between 1862 and 1863 by a Belgian company to link the railway line of Civitavecchia to Roma Termini railway station. The Belgian company accomplished the work in England, then the bridge was moved in pieces to Rome, where it was mounted.

In 1911, with the opening of the new station of Trastevere, the railway line was moved to the new Ponte San Paolo, a little further upstream.

On the night of 2 October 2021 it was partially damaged by fire. On 12 December, after merely 70 days, the bridge has been repaired and opened for traffic. Before closing again on July 24, 2023 in order to update, restore and widen the bridge.

The restoration of the bridge had a series of problems which led to several accidents and postponements of the project's completion. In January, it was announced that the work would be completed on December 8, 2024 to coincide with the opening of the Holy Door for the 2025 Jubilee, only to be postponed for the end of January 2025, the end of February 2025, March 17, 2025, and finally to March 20, 2025.

== Description ==
Built completely in metal, it has three lights in metal girders and is about 131 meters long.

== Sources ==
- Ravaglioli, Armando (1997). Roma anno 2750 ab Urbe condita. Storia, monumenti, personaggi, prospettive. Roma: Tascabili Economici Newton. ISBN 88-8183-670-X.
- Rendina, Claudio (2005). Enciclopedia di Roma. Roma: Newton Compton Editori. ISBN 88-541-0304-7.
