= Porta Trigemina =

Gate in the ancient 4th century BC Servian Wall of Rome, Italy

Coordinates: 41°53′12″N 12°28′48″E

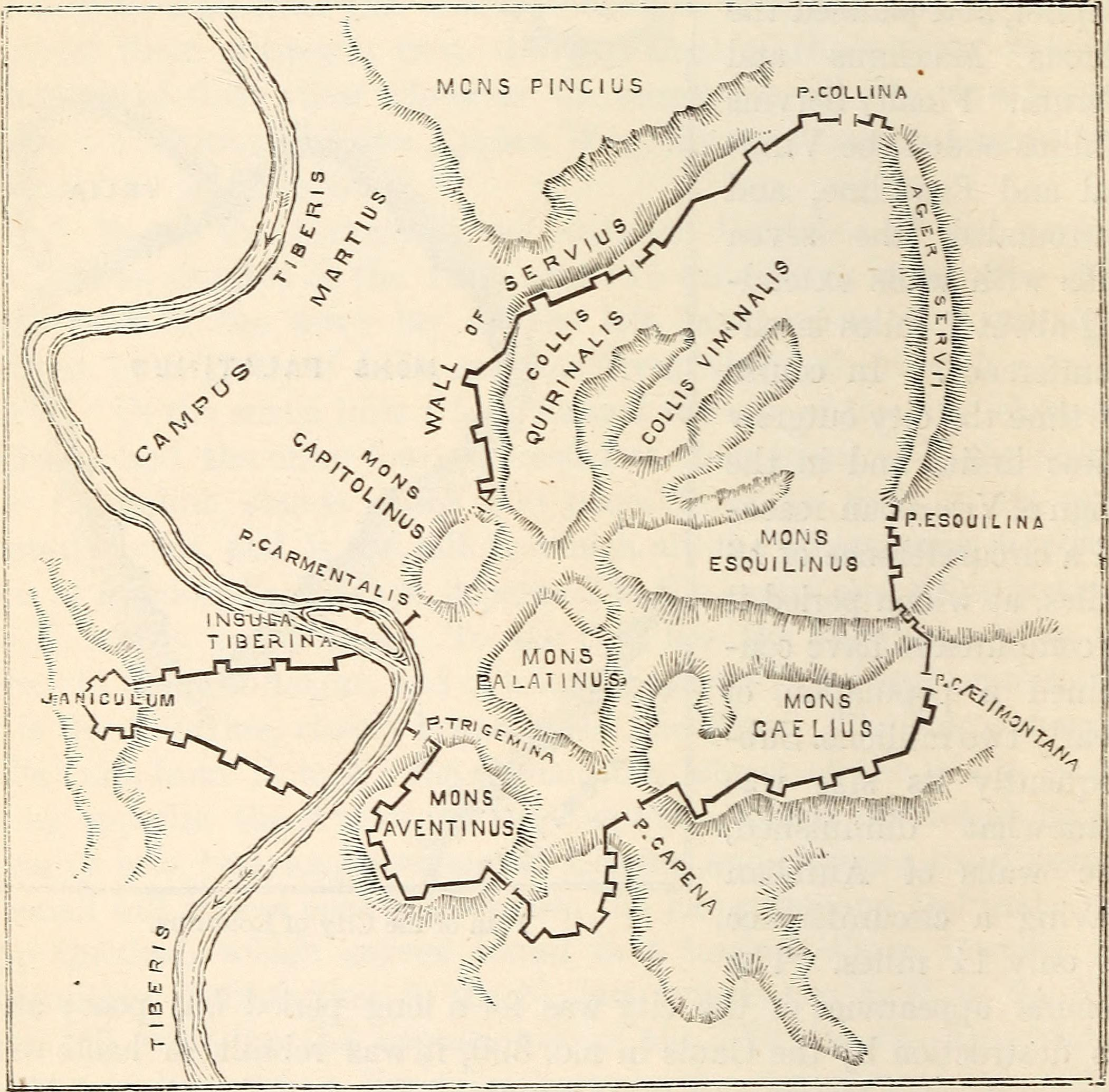

The Porta Trigemina was one of the main gates in the ancient 4th century BC Servian Wall of Rome, Italy. The gate no longer exists, but it is frequently mentioned by ancient authors as standing between the north end of the Aventine Hill and the Tiber River, placing it near the southeastern end of the Forum Boarium. The Clivus Publicius descended from the Aventine to the Porta Trigemina.

It is presumed that its name (which means "triple uniting") refers to its triple gateway to accommodate heavy traffic that passed into the city from the Via Ostiensis. It was known for the crowd of beggars that were found just outside the gate.
