= Porta Ardeatina =

Gate in the Aurelian Walls of Rome, Italy

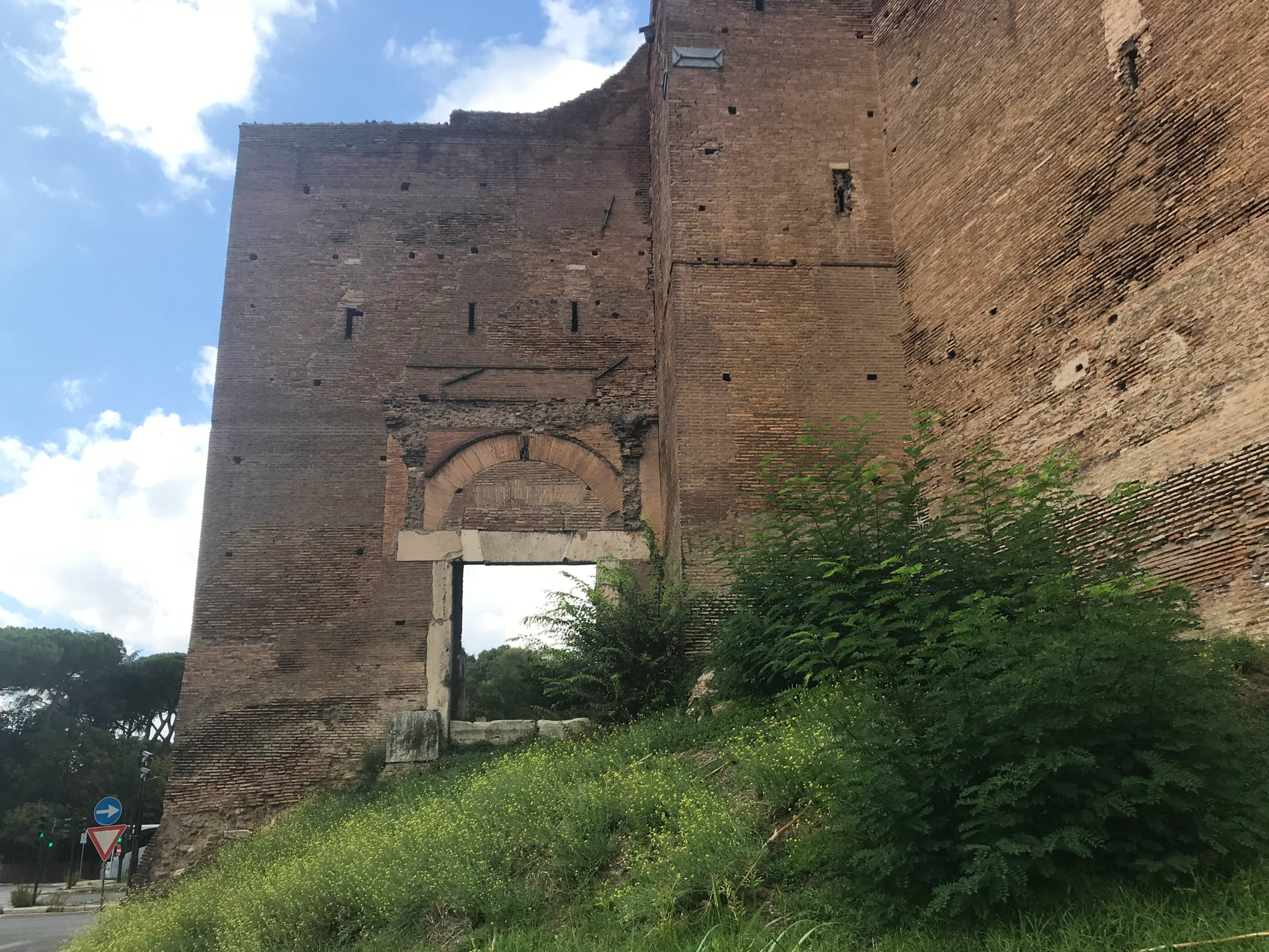
- Porta Ardeatina today

- Location within Rome
- Interactive map of Porta Ardeatina
- 41°52′23.88″N 12°29′49.56″E
- Location: Rome, Italy

Porta Ardeatina is a gate in the Aurelian Walls of Rome. The gate was built in the time of Nero. It stands at an angle in the Aurelian Walls.

It was placed at a halfway point between Porta Appia and Porta San Paolo, close to the modern arches under which Via Cristoforo Colombo runs. The gate was probably locked very soon (it is no more mentioned starting from the 8th century); on the base of the present remains, it can arguably be classified as a simple postern, framed with travertine, whose most interesting characteristic is the presence, both inside and outside the wall, of a stretch of paved road dating from the Roman period, in which the tracks left by carts traffic – that should have been quite intense – are still visible.

The gate had no defensive towers: this lack was fixed by means of a projection of the wall, which could therefore serve as a little rampart.

According to a statement by the humanist and historian Poggio Bracciolini, Porta Ardeatina bore the usual memorial plate, commemorating the restoration carried out by Emperor Honorius in 401–403. This could indicate that it was not just a simple secondary passage, but a real single-arch gate.

Close to the gate, on the inner side, remains of a grave incorporated into the wall are visible: this is consistent with the project of Emperor Aurelian, who, to lessen the costs and speed up the building of the wall circle, integrated former structures within the wall itself.

== See also ==
- Ancient Roman defensive walls
- List of ancient sites in Rome

Preceded by Aurelian Walls	Landmarks of Rome; Porta Ardeatina	Succeeded by Porta Asinaria
