= Porta San Paolo =

Gate of the Aurelian walls, a landmark of Rome, Italy

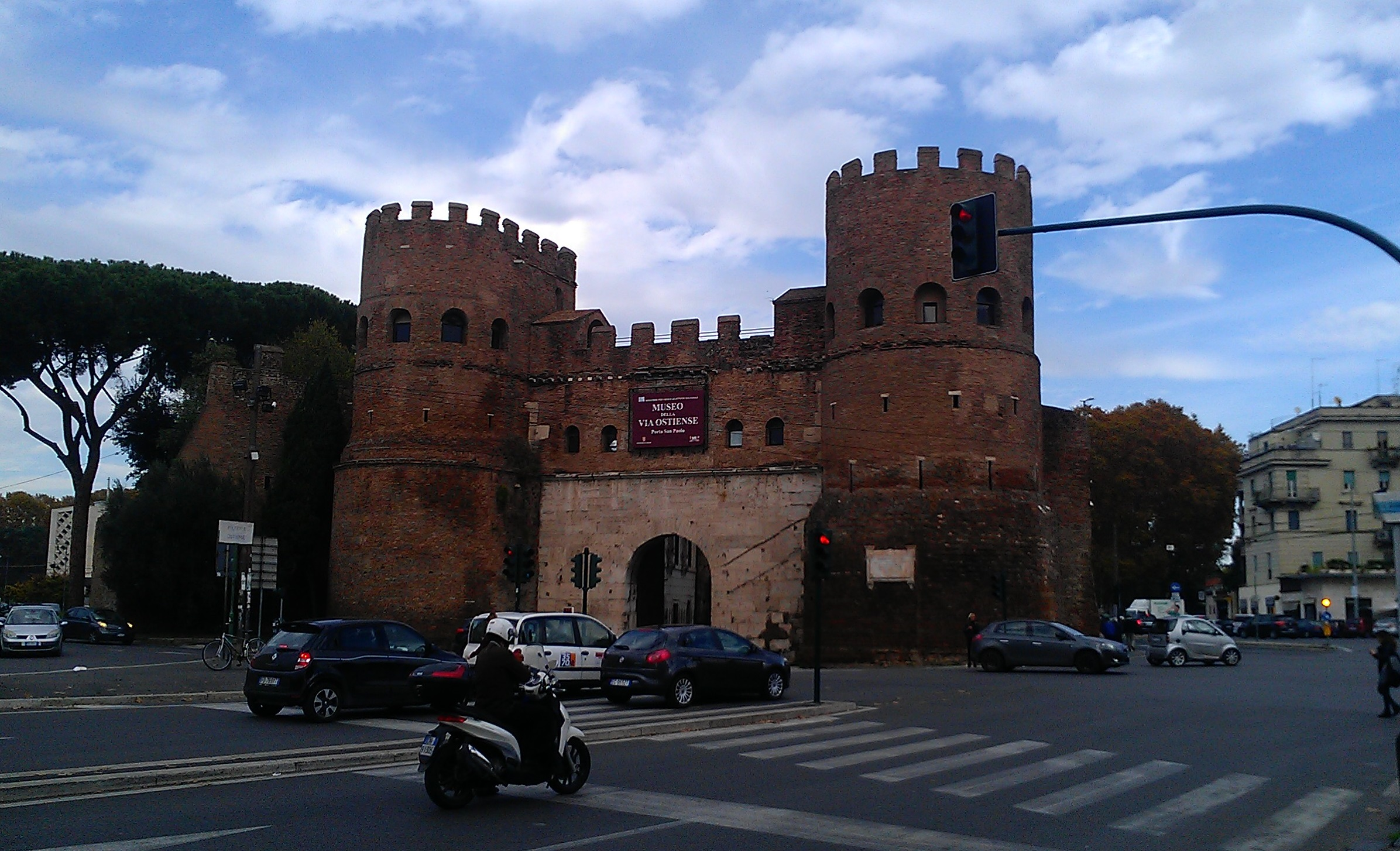
- Porta San Paolo

- Location within Rome
- Interactive map of Porta San Paolo
- 41°52′36″N 12°28′53″E

The Porta San Paolo ('Saint Paul Gate') is one of the southern gates in the 3rd-century Aurelian Walls of Rome, Italy. The Via Ostiense Museum (museo della Via Ostiense) is housed within the gatehouse. It is in the Ostiense quarter; just to the west is the Roman Pyramid of Cestius, an Egyptian-style pyramid, and beyond that is the Protestant Cemetery.

== History ==
The original name of the gate was Porta Ostiensis, as it was located at the beginning of via Ostiense, the road that connected Rome and Ostia. Via Ostiense was an important arterial road, as evidenced by the fact that upon entering the gate of the same name, the road split, with one direction leading to the famous Emporium, the great market of Rome.

The gatehouse is flanked by two cylindrical towers, and has two entrances, which had been covered by a second, single-opening gate, built in front of the first by the Byzantine general Belisarius (530s–540s).

The structure is due to Maxentius, in the 4th century, but the two towers were heightened by Honorius. Its original—Latin—name was Porta Ostiensis, since it opened on the way to Ostia. Later, it was renamed to the Italian Porta San Paolo, because it was the exit of Rome that led to the Basilica of St. Paul Outside the Walls.

In 549, Rome was under siege; the Ostrogoths of Totila entered through this gate, because of the treason of the Isaurian garrison.

On 10 September 1943, two days after the armistice between the Allies and Italy had been agreed, Italian military and civil forces tried to block German seizure of the city, with 570 casualties.

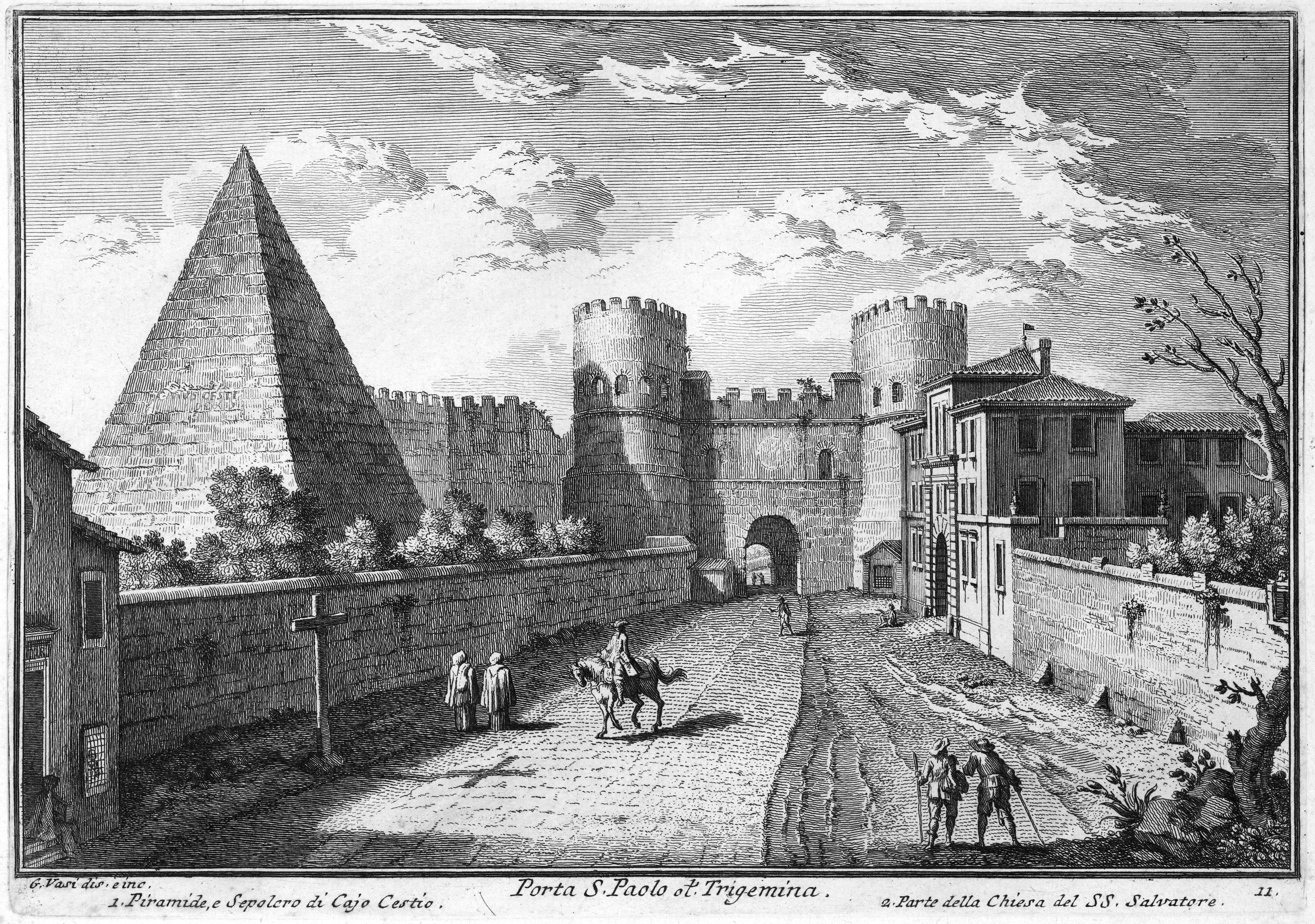
Giuseppe Vasi etching of Porta San Paolo and Pyramid of Cestius, in the 18th century.

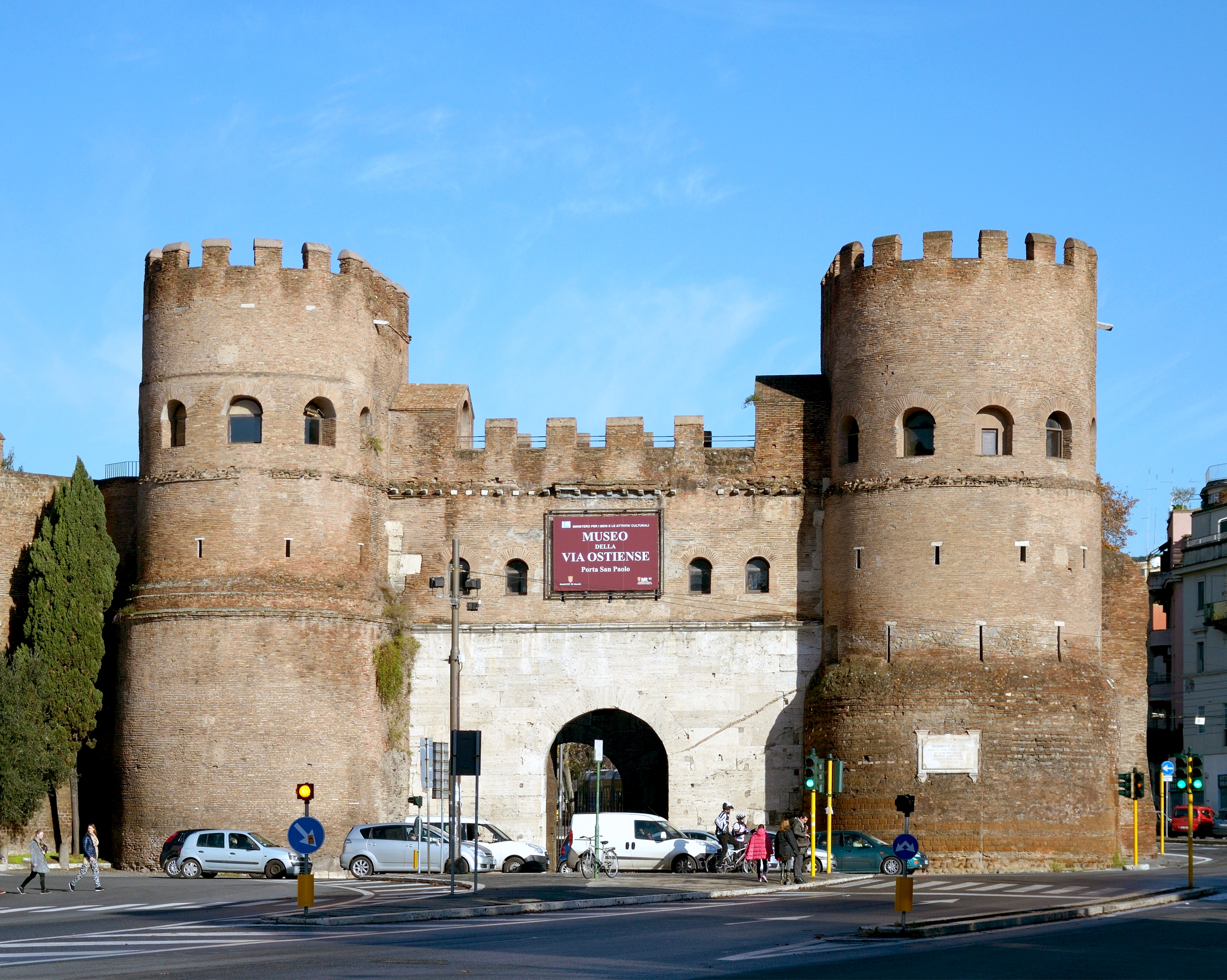
The gate has been separated from the Aurelian Walls, and looks like a castle, with the two towers and the double entrance. It is, therefore, sometimes called "Castelletto".

== See also ==
- Porta San Giovanni – Gate of the Aurelian walls, a landmark of Rome, Italy

== Notes ==
Preceded by Porta San Pancrazio	Landmarks of Rome; Porta San Paolo	Succeeded by Porta San Giovanni
