= Barbara Mazzei =

Italian archaeologist

Barbara Mazzei is an Italian archaeologist known for the discovery of the earliest iconography of the Apostles.

== Biography ==
Mazzei works in the Vatican's Pontifical Commission for Sacred Archaeology.

== Research ==
The earliest images of St Paul were uncovered by a team led by Mazzei in 2009 in the catacomb of Santa Tecla (or Thekla). She was martyred at the beginning of the reign of Diocletian at the beginning of the fourth century.

In 2010, Mazzei's team discovered images depicting the apostles John, Paul, Andrew and Peter in the catacombs of Santa Tecla. These were dated to the fourth century, following the legalisation of Christianity in the Roman empire by Constantine. The images were on the vault of a tomb of a Roman noblewoman who converted to Christianity. Mazzei believes these images provided the standard for subsequent Christian iconography. These were also the earliest known depictions of Andrew and John. The images were uncovered by removing with a laser the calcium deposits that obscured them, the first time the technique was used in the catacombs.

Mazzei led a seven-year investigation and restoration of Rome's catacombs of St Domitilla, which uncovered frescoes dating to around AD 360. Using laser techniques similar to those at Santa Tecla, the team was able to penetrate the grime in order to reveal the frescoes, on the ceilings of two tombs of imperial grain merchants. The frescoes also depicted the transport of grain from around the Mediterranean to Ostia.

With the help of the lasers, each layer of smoke deposit, chalk and algae was stripped. By the use of multiple wavelength lasers and chromatic selection, the deposits were removed millimetre by millimetre. The team discovered the images of the merchants accompanied by two saints, possibly the martyrs Nereus and Achilleus from the time of Diocletian. This enabled the dating of the frescoes to the latter half of the fourth century.

== Selected works ==
=== Articles ===
- Mazzei, B.; Severini, F. (2000). "Il fenomeno monastico nelle isole minori del mar tirreno dal IV al IX secolo: fonti letterarie ed evidenze archeologiche". Rivista di archeologia cristiana. 76 (1–2). Pontificio istituto di archeologia cristiana. ISSN 0035-6042.
- Mazzei, B. (2005). "La conservazione delle pitture delle catacombe romane. Antichi espedienti e recenti esperienze". ICOMOS–Hefte des Deutschen Nationalkomitees. 42.
- Tapete, D.; Fratini, F.; Mazzei, B.; Camaiti, M.; Cantisani, E.; Riminesi, C.; Del, R.M. (2012). "Calcium carbonate crystallizations on hypogean mural paintings: a pilot study of monitoring and diagnostics in Roman catacombs" (PDF). Geophysical Research Abstracts. 14.
- Pecchioli, L.; Pucci, M.; Mohamed, F.; Mazzei, B. (2012). Browsing in the virtual museum of the sarcophagi in the Basilica of St. Silvestro at the Catacombs of Priscilla in Rome. 18th International Conference on Virtual Systems and Multimedia (VSMM). doi:10.1109/VSMM.2012.6365953.
- Bracci, S.; Realini, M.; Sacchi, B.; Bartolozzi, G.; Patrizi, M.G.; Mazzei, B. (July 2013). The cubicle "dei fornai" in Domitilla catacombs (Rome): Non-invasive analyses for the characterization of the materials (PDF). Proceedings of the International Congress “Scienza e Beni Culturali XXIX “Conservazione e Valorizzazione dei Siti Archeologici. Approcci Scientifici e Problemi di Metodo.
- Pecchioli, L.; Mohamed, F.; Pucci, M.; Mazzei, B. (2013). "Museum of the sculptures of the basilica of Saint Silvestro integrating the visit at the catacombs of Priscilla in Rome" (PDF). Built Heritage.
- Iannaccone, R.; Bracci, S.; Cantisani, E.; Mazzei, B. (November 2015). "An integrated multimethodological approach for characterizing the materials and pigments on a sarcophagus in St. Mark, Marcellian and Damasus catacombs". Applied Physics A: Materials Science & Processing. 121 (3).

=== Books ===
- Giuliani, Raffaella; Mazzei, Barbara (2016). The Catacombs of Priscilla. Pontificia Comm. Arch. Sacra. ISBN 978-88-88420-22-6.
