= Via Cristoforo Colombo =

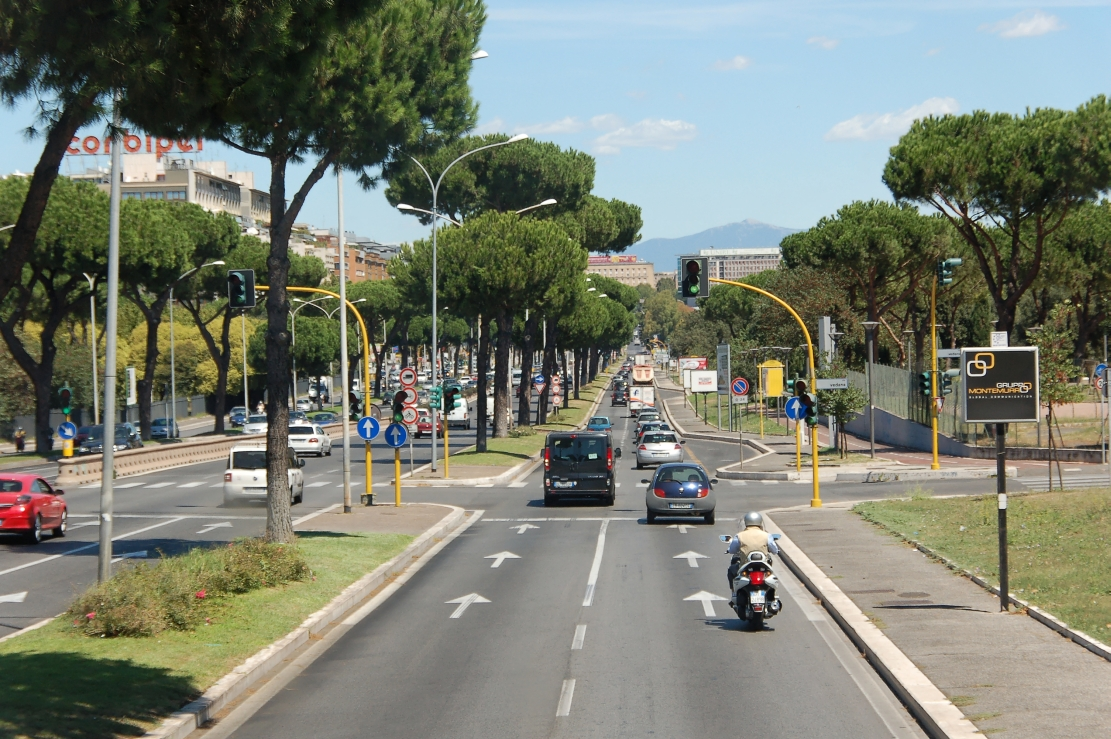

Via Cristoforo Colombo (or just la Colombo, as it is often called by the Romans; Italian pronunciation: [kriˈstɔːforo koˈlombo]) is a street in Rome (Italy) that links the historic centre to Ostia. Along most of its route, the street has three lanes for each direction of movement. With its 27 kilometres (17 mi) length it is the longest Italian road among those included within the borders of a single municipality and, in several stretches, the largest in Italy.

Via Cristoforo Colombo starts from Porta Ardeatina and continues south-west, ending on the coast in the district of Castel Fusano.

== History ==
The street was designed in 1937 with the name of Via Imperiale, as a part of the five-years plan of works associated to the 1941 World's fair of Rome: it should have linked the centre of the town to the new exhibition buildings (EUR) and then continue towards the Lido di Roma, according to Mussolini's project of enlargement of Rome to the sea.

== Route ==
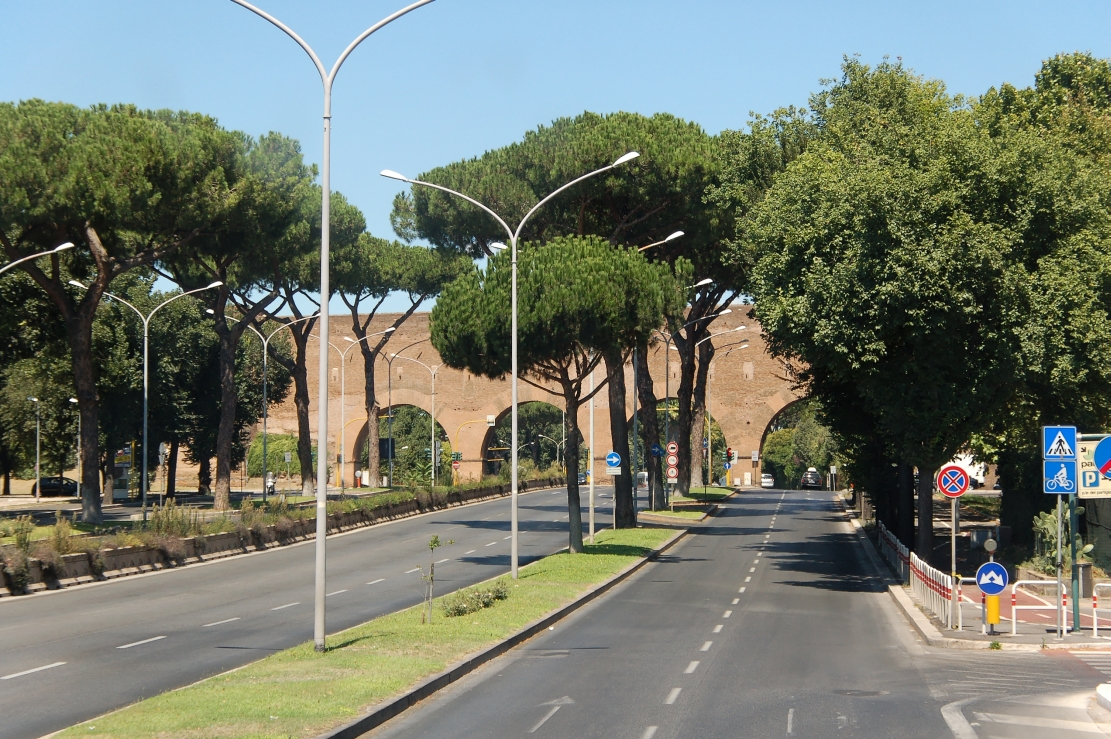
The beginning of Via Cristoforo Colombo at Porta Ardeatina

It starts from the Aurelian Walls, close to Porta Ardeatina, and goes southward, soon trespassing a stretch of the bypass (Via Cilicia) and the rail circuit near the Roma Ostiense railway station.

At Piazza dei Navigatori it turns westward, running along the Palace of Lazio Region on the right and the former Fiera di Roma.

After passing the complex of junctions from which Viale Marconi starts (Marconi metro station, line B), it trespasses the sports facilities of Tre Fontane and enters the Europa Quarter.

In correspondence to the EUR lake (EUR Palasport and EUR Fermi metro stations, line B), it trespasses the reservoir and divides itself into two separated stretches that pass the PalaLottomatica.

After crossing Viale dell'Oceano Pacifico and Viale dell'Oceano Atlantico, the street leaves the EUR Quarter and the more densely inhabited area of the town.

Soon after the trunk road nr. 148 "Pontina" comes off on the left and after a few kilometres the street underpasses the Grande Raccordo Anulare; Via Colombo can be accessed from the Raccordo just from its outer lane.

Starting from Via del Risaro it runs along the presidential estate of Castelporziano, then reaches Casal Palocco and, after passing the pine forest of Castelfusano, ends in Piazzale Cristoforo Colombo in Ostia, close to the railway station with the same name.

The street is lined with stone pines.

== Topography ==
Via Cristoforo Colombo is a primary arterial road in Rome that serves as the boundary for several of the city's quarters and zones.

=== Right side ===
- Q. X Ostiense, from the Aurelian Walls to the viaduct of Via delle Tre Fontane
- Q. XXXII Europa, from Via delle Tre Fontane to Via di Decima
- Z. XXVII Torrino, from Via di Decima to the Grande Raccordo AnulareRaccordo Anulare - South bypass
- Z. XXX Castel Fusano, from the Grande Raccordo AnulareRaccordo Anulare - South bypass to Viale della Villa di Plinio
- Q. XXXV Lido di Castel Fusano from Viale della Villa di Plinio to Piazzale Cristoforo Colombo
- Z. XXXI Mezzocammino from Piazzale Cristoforo Colombo

=== Left side ===
- Q. XX Ardeatino, from the Aurelian Walls to Via Laurentina
- Q. XXXII Europa, from Via Laurentina to the Grande Raccordo AnulareRaccordo Anulare - South bypass
- Z. XXIV Fonte Ostiense, from the Grande Raccordo AnulareRaccordo Anulare - South bypass to Via Pontina
- Z. XXVII Torrino
- Z. XXX Castel Fusano, from the Grande Raccordo AnulareRaccordo Anulare - South bypass to Viale della Villa di Plinio
- Q. XXXV Lido di Castel Fusano from Viale della Villa di Plinio to Piazzale Cristoforo Colombo
- Z. XXXI Mezzocammino from Piazzale Cristoforo Colombo to Via di Malafede
- Z. XXXIII Acilia Sud from Via di Malafede to Via Pindaro
- Z. XXXIV Casal Palocco from Via Pindaro

== Bibliography ==
- Anna Maria Ramieri, La via Imperiale e le scoperte archeologiche (1937–1941) in Gli anni del Governatorato (1926–1944), pp. 109–114, Collection Quaderni dei monumenti, Rome, Edizioni Kappa, 1995. ISBN 88-7890-181-4.
- Simone Quilici, L'espansione di Roma verso il mare. La Via Imperiale in E42-EUR: segno e sogno del Novecento, pp. 38-40, by Carlo Fabrizio Carli, Gianni Mercurio, Luigi Prisco, Rome, DataArs, 2005.
- Simone Quilici, La Via Imperiale e lo sviluppo urbano delle aree circostanti in La Casa del Jazz a Roma. Il recupero di Villa Osio, sottratta alla criminalità e consegnata ai cittadini, pp. 18-20, by Guido Ingrao, Milan, Electa, 2008.
