= Santa Passera =

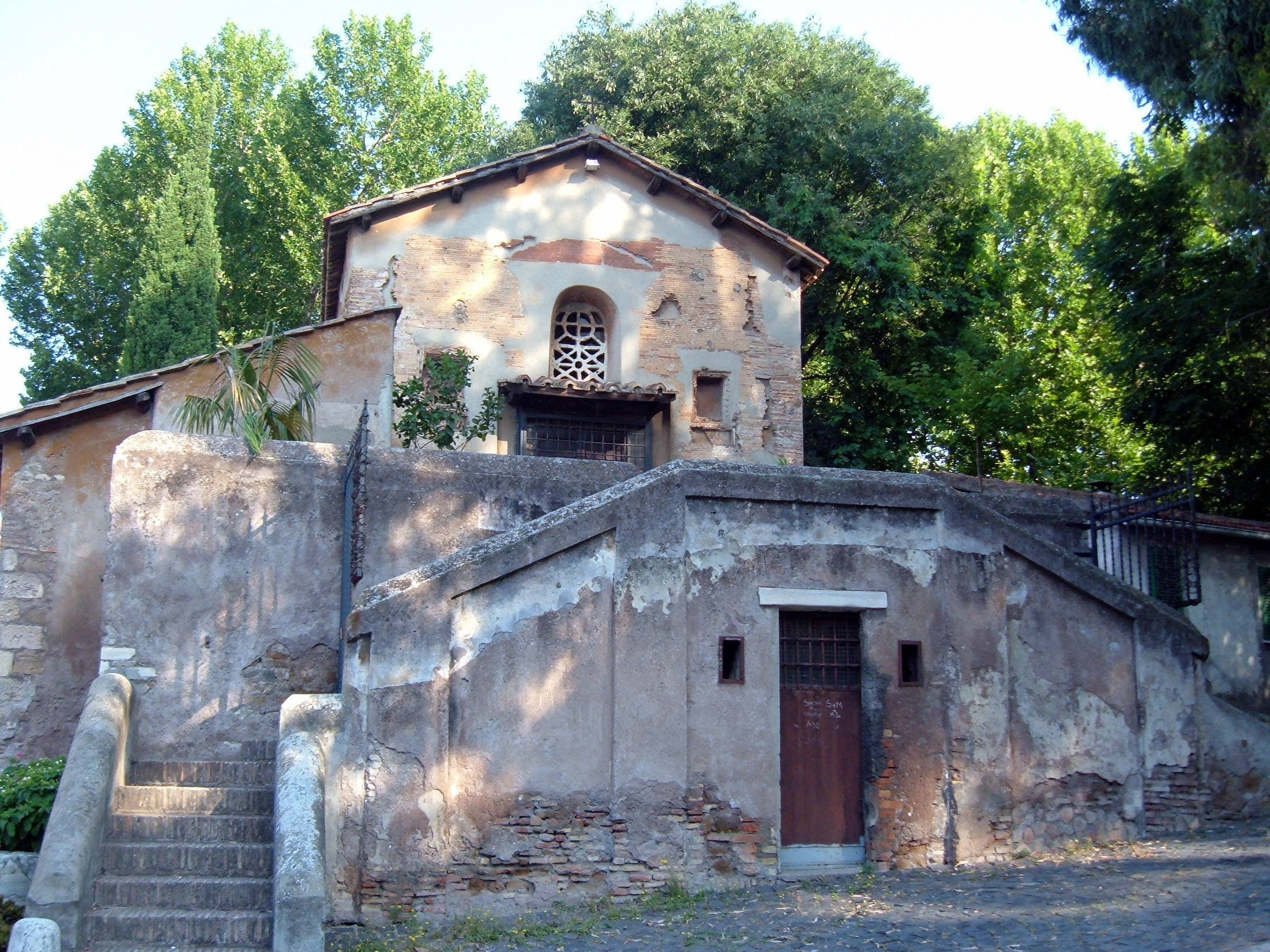
- Façade
- Click on the map for a fullscreen view
- 41°51′31″N 12°27′37″E
- Location: Rome
- Country: Italy
- Denomination: Roman Catholic

Architecture
- Architectural type: Church

Santa Passera is a church in the south of Rome on the other bank of the curve in the river Tiber from the Basilica of Saint Paul Outside the Walls. The current church, erected in the ninth century, incorporated a Roman tomb. The church served a small community of miners who worked in the tuff quarries of the nearby hills.

The interior retains some remnants of medieval frescoes.

== Name ==
There is no Saint Passera. Its name is a linguistic corruption of "Abbas Cyrus" ("Father Cyrus"), by way of Abbaciro, Appaciro, Appacero, Pacero, Pacera, and finally Passera. This name is in reference to the Egyptian saints Cyrus and John, whose relics were brought to Rome in the fifth century.
