= Via Laurentina =

The Via Laurentina is the name borne by an ancient and a modern road of Italy, both leading southwards from Rome.

== The ancient road ==
The question of the nomenclature of the group of roads between the Via Ardeatina and the Via Ostiensis is somewhat difficult, and much depends on the view taken as to the site of Laurentum. It seems probable, however, that the Via Laurentina proper is that which led out of the Porta Ardeatina of the Aurelian Wall and went direct to Tor Paterno, while the road branching from the Via Ostiensis at the third mile, and leading past Decimo to Lavinium (Pratica), which crosses the other road at right angles not far from its destination (the Laurentina there running SW and that to Lavinium SE) may for convenience be called Lavinatis, though this name does not occur in ancient times. On this latter road, beyond Decimo, two milestones, one of Tiberius, the other of Maxentius, each bearing the number II, have been found; and farther on, at Capocotta, traces of ancient buildings, and an important sepulchral inscription of a Jewish ruler of a synagogue have come to light. That the Via Laurentina was near the Via Ardeatina is clear from the fact that the same contractor was responsible for both roads. Laurentum was also accessible by a branch from the Via Ostiensis at the eighth mile (at Malafede) leading past Castel Porziano, the President of Republic estate, which is identical with the ancient Ager Solonius (in which, Festus tells us, was situated the Pomonal or sacred grove of Pomona) and which later belonged to Gaius Marius.

== The modern road ==
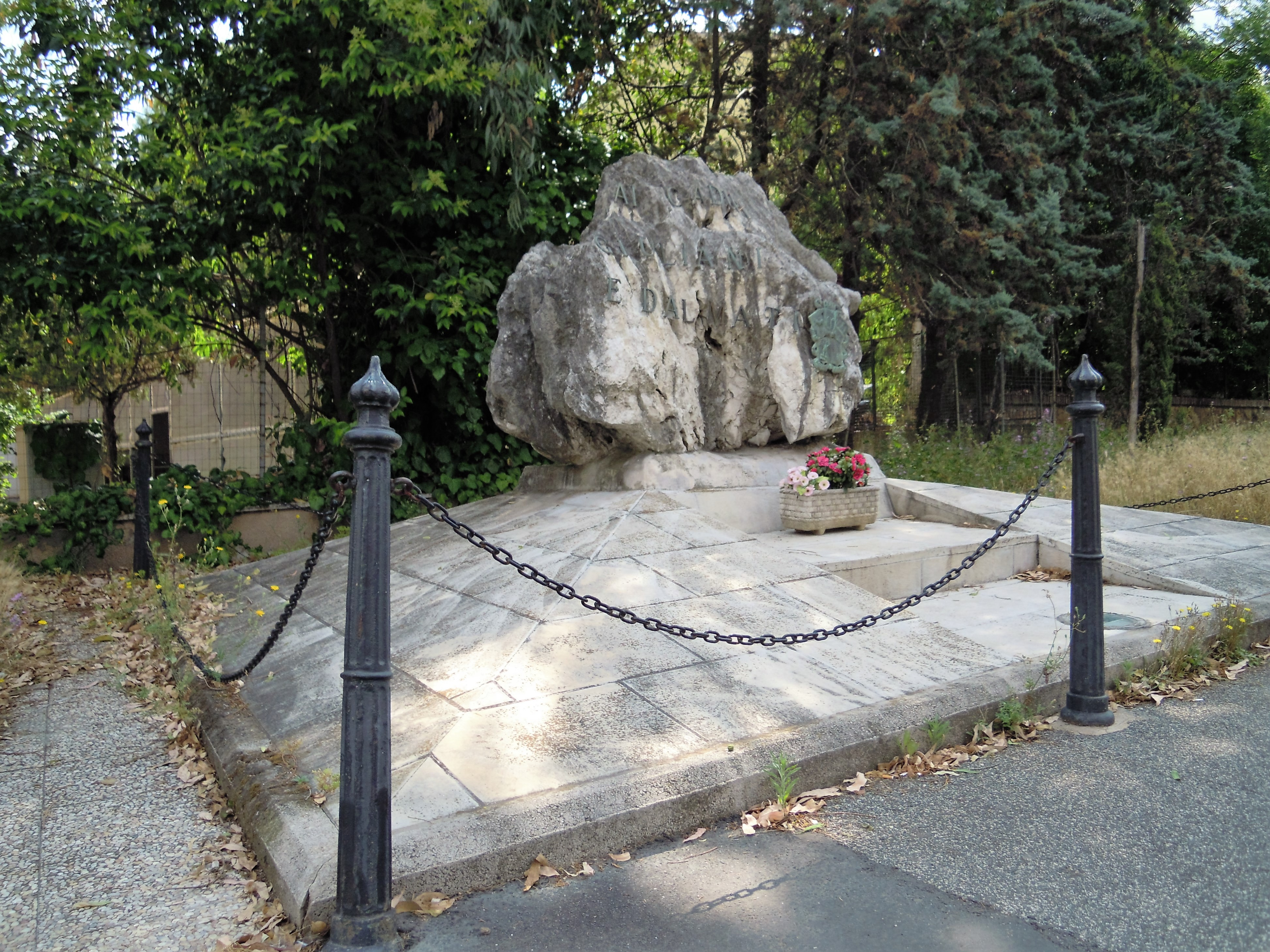
Monument to the julian and dalmatian dead soldiers (1961), erected along the Via Laurentina

The modern road begins in Rome, in the Ostiense district, separating itself from the consular road Via Ostiense precisely under a railway bridge of the Rome–Lido railway and the Rome Metro B underground: this place, at a short distance from the Basilica di San Paolo fuori le mura, was known since the 16th century as the Ponticello di San Paolo, because of a short bridge now covered by the current road that allowed the crossing of the Via Ostiense on the marrana of Grotta Perfetta, which at a short distance from there discharges into the Tiber.

The Via Laurentina, leading towards south, first delimits the border between the districts of Eur (to the west) and Ardeatino and Giuliano-Dalmata (to the east), then between the Fonte Ostiense area and the Giuliano-Dalmata district: it then divides the Vallerano and Castel di Decima areas from the Castel di Leva area. Leaving Rome, at the intersection with the road to Albano, it crosses Santa Procula, a hamlet of Pomezia, then crosses the SS148 state road (via Pontina), which leads to Latina, and finally arrives to Ardea.

After Ardea the road ends at the seaside resort of Tor San Lorenzo where it flows into the SS601 state road Ostia-Anzio (via Litoranea).

Along the road, at km 14, it lies the Laurentino Cemetery. It contains a portion called the Garden of Angels, dedicated to deceased children and unborn babies. Pope Francis said the annual Papal Mass for All Souls Day in the Garden in 2018.
