= Via Ostiensis =

Roman road from Rome to Ostia, Italy

Via Ostiense
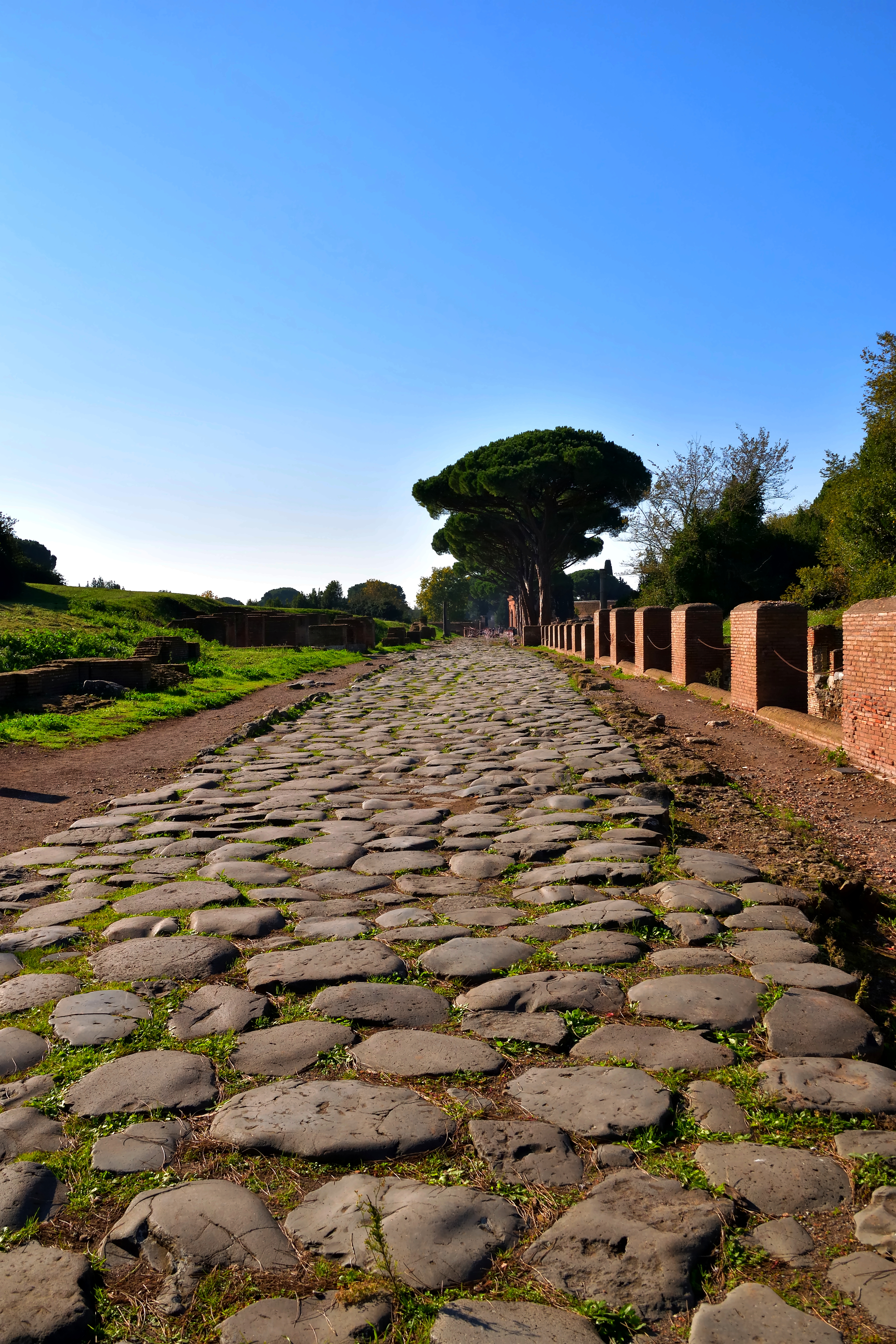
- The road in Ostia (ancient port of Rome)
- Interactive map of Via Ostiense
- Type: Roman road
- Location: Rome to Ostia

History
- Built by: Roman Republic

The Via Ostiensis (Italian: via Ostiense) was an important road in ancient Rome. It runs west 30 kilometres (19 mi) from the city of Rome to its important sea port of Ostia Antica, from which it took its name. The road began near the Forum Boarium, ran between the Aventine Hill and the Tiber River along its left (eastern) bank, and left the city's Servian Walls through the Porta Trigemina. When the later Aurelian Walls were built, the road left the city through the Porta Ostiensis (Porta San Paolo). In the Late Roman Empire, trade suffered under an economic crisis, and Ostia declined as an important port. With the accompanying growth of importance of the Via Portuensis from the time of Constantine onwards, that of the Via Ostiensis correspondingly decreased.

== Roman bridges ==
There are the remains of at least one Roman bridge along the road, which is the Ponte presso Tor di Valle.

== Modern Via Ostiense ==
The modern Via Ostiense (SP8) follows a similar path to the old road, forming the main connection between Rome and Ostia (one of the quarters of Rome at present) together with the Via del Mare. On its way to Ostia, the road passes by the important basilica of Saint Paul Outside the Walls.

== See also ==
- Roman road
- Roman bridge
- Roman engineering
- Ostiense
