= Gianicolense =

Q. XII Gianicolense
- Quartiere of Rome
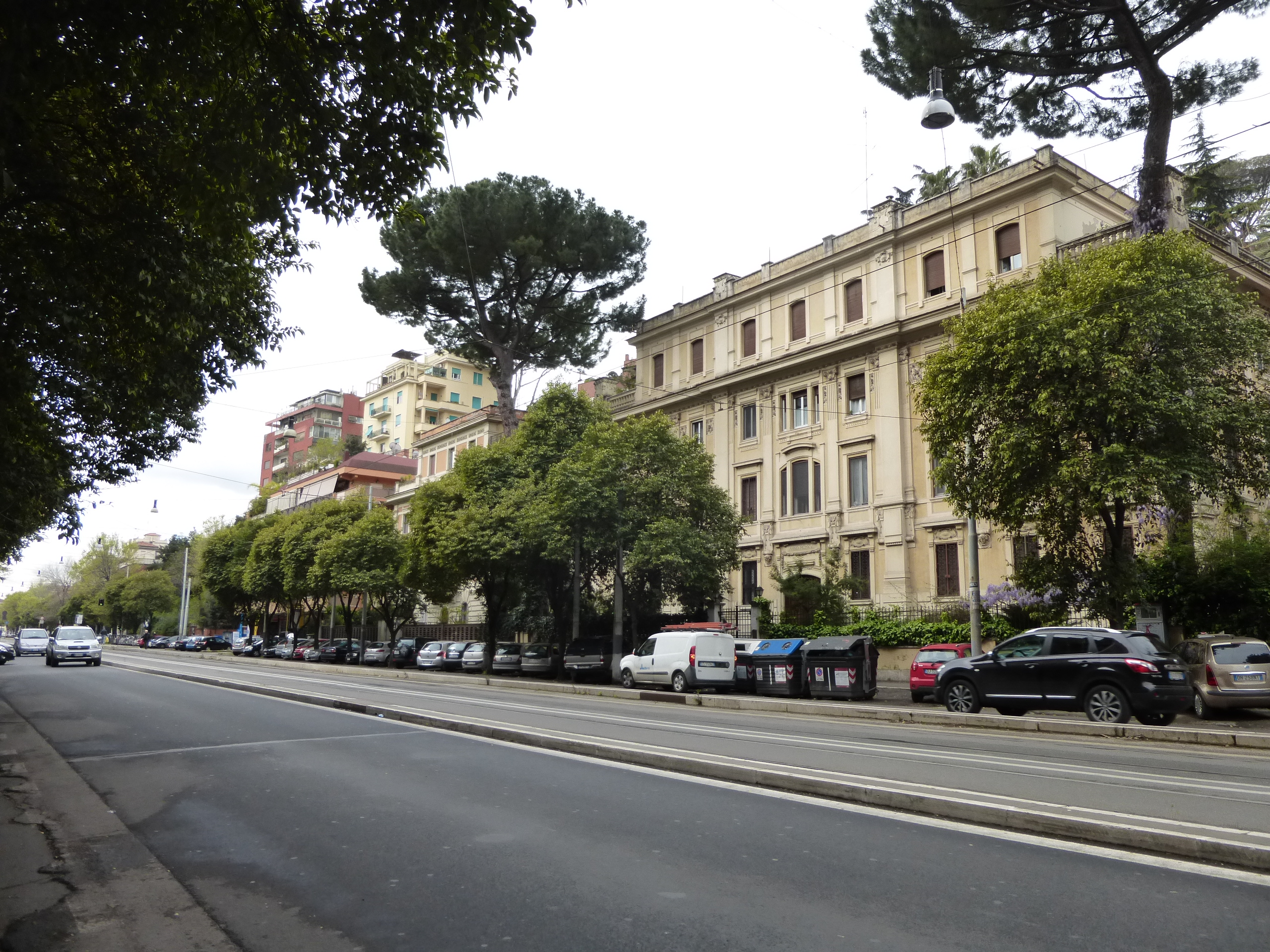
- Viale di Trastevere

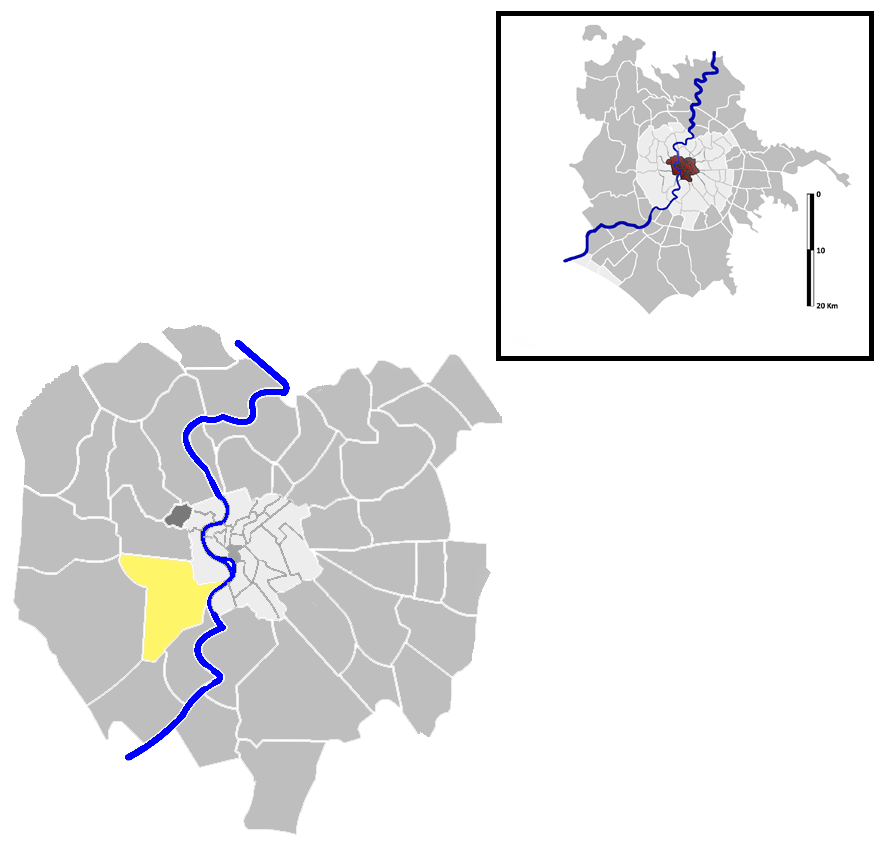
- Position of the quartiere within the city of Rome
- Country: Italy
- Region: Lazio
- Metropolitan City: Rome
- Comune: Rome
- Municipio: Municipio XI; Municipio XII
- Established: 20 August 1921

Area
  - Total: 2.9221 sq mi (7.5682 km^{2})

Population (2016)
  - Total: 89,618
- Time zone: UTC+1 (CET)
  - Summer (DST): UTC+2 (CEST)

Gianicolense [dʒanikoˈlɛnse] is the 12th quartiere of Rome (Italy), identified by the initials Q. XII. It belongs to the Municipio XI and Municipio XII. It takes its name from the Janiculum hill, which lies in the nearby rione Trastevere and whose western extremities correspond to the area of Monteverde.

== History ==
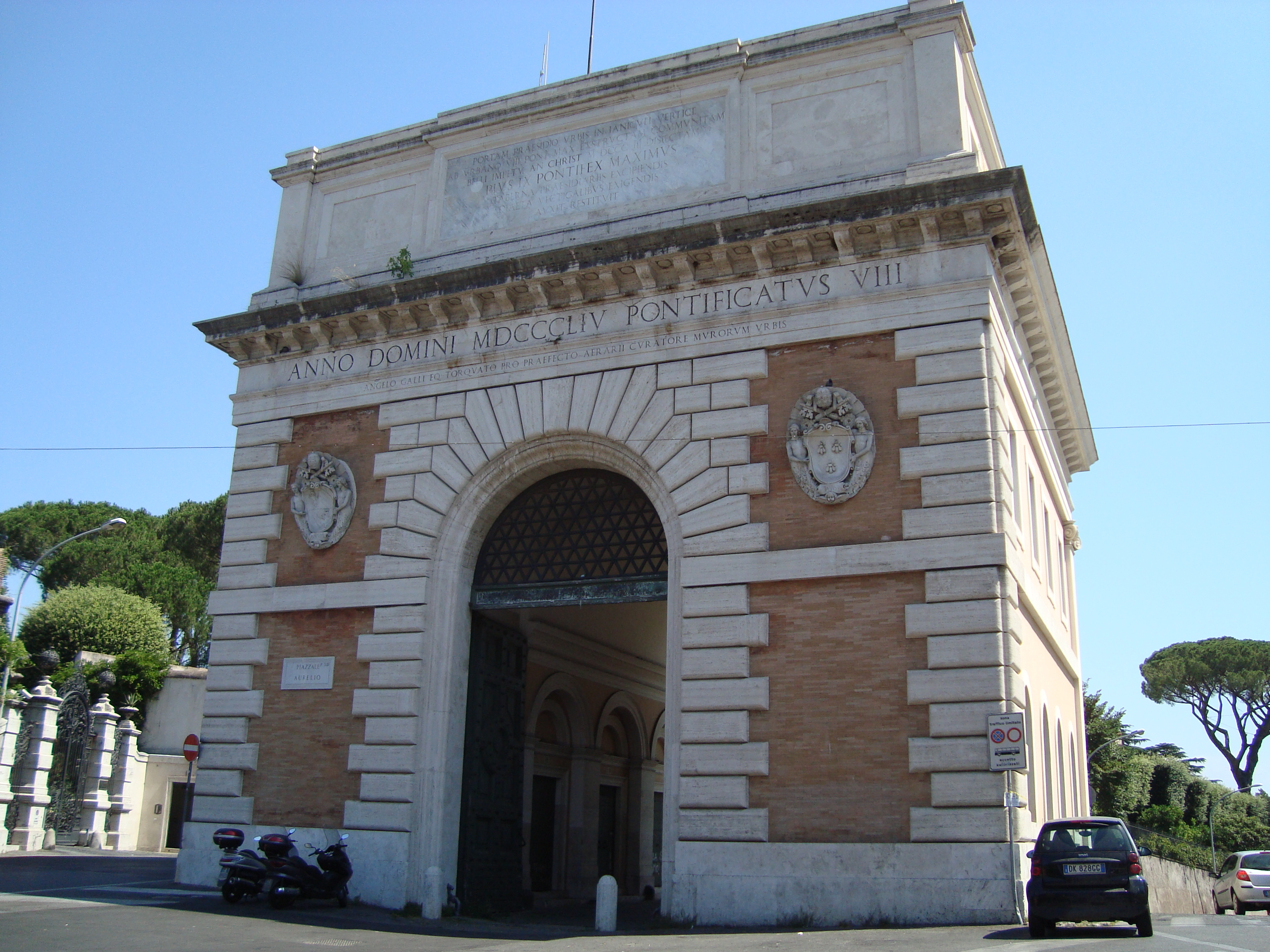
Porta San Pancrazio

The quarter is full of historical vestiges, being close to the ancient city: here stood the Horti Caesaris, a number of pagan places of worship, and some Christian and Jewish catacombs, like the catacombs of Pontian and San Pancrazio, underneath the same name basilica.

In ancient times, the territory was crossed by the Via di Monteverde, which used to be a cross street of the Via Portuense and whose initial stretch corresponds to the current Via Giuseppe Parini, and by the Via Vitellia, that linked the Janiculum with the Tyrrhenian coast.

In the 17th century, the merger of several vineyards led to the creation of Villa Doria Pamphili, which hosts the casino designed by Alessandro Algardi. The villa was the scene of bloody battles during the 1849 defense of the Roman Republic. The villa was expropriated and opened to public in 1972, and it is currently the largest public park in Rome.

The expansion of the quarter began, on the basis of the 1909 town plan, in the area close to the Janiculum walls, near Via Carini and Piazza Rosolino Pilo: the area, which took the name of Monteverde Vecchio, is characterized by refined cottages with gardens. The expansion continued in the Fascist era, when the public housing buildings nicknamed Grattacieli ("skyscrapers") were built along Via di Donna Olimpia. Also, the Ospedale del Littorio (which later was named Ospedale San Camillo) and the apartment blocks in the area of Monteverde Nuovo were built in that period.

== Geography ==
The quartiere is located in the western part of the city, near the Janiculum walls. It includes the urban zones 16D Gianicolense and 16X Villa Pamphili, and a great part of the urban zone 16A Colli Portuensi.

The western portion of the quarter is commonly referred to as Monteverde, after the lower part of the Janiculum hill. Monteverde (Italian for green mountain) presumably takes its name from the green-yellowish tuff that was mined from the quarries that were scattered in the territory.

=== Boundaries ===
The quarter borders, to the north, with quartiere Aurelio (Q. XIII), from which it is separated by the portion of Via Aurelia Antica between Via della Nocetta and Piazzale Aurelio. It also borders with rione Trastevere, whose boundary is marked by the stretch of the Janiculum walls between Porta San Pancrazio (Piazzale Aurelio) and Porta Portese.

Eastward, the quarter borders with quartiere Portuense (Q. XI), whose border is defined by Via Portuense, Via Ettore Rolli and another stretch of Via Portuense, up to Largo Gaetano La Loggia.

To the south, Gianicolense borders with suburbio Portuense, from which it is separated by the stretch of Via Portuense between Largo Gaetano La Loggia and Via del Casaletto.

To the west, the quarter borders with suburbio Gianicolense: the boundary is outlined by Via del Casaletto, Piazzetta del Bel Respiro and Via della Nocetta.

=== Odonymy ===
The territory of quartiere Gianicolense is crossed by the eponymous circonvallazione and by Via dei Colli Portuensi, a thoroughfare which was built in view of the 1960 Summer Olympics as part of the so-called Via Olimpica, a road axis that was aimed to connect EUR with the Stadio Olimpico. Odonyms of the quarter can be categorized as follows:

- Architects related to Villa Doria Pamphili, near the villa, e.g. Via Alessandro Algardi, Via Francesco Bolognesi, Via Basilio Bricci, Via Andrea Busiri Vici, Via Giovanni Battista Falda;
- Authors and poets, near Porta Portese, e.g. Piazza Flavio Biondo, Via Guido Guinizelli, Via Giambattista Marino, Via Vincenzo Monti, Largo Alfredo Oriani, Via Giuseppe Parini, Via Cesare Pascarella, Via Ippolito Pindemonte, Via Carlo Porta, Via Giovanni Prati, Via Niccolò Tommaseo, Via Lorenzo Valla;
- Diplomats, in the area of Villa Flora, e.g. Via Isacco Artom, Via Luigi Corti, Viale Giovanni Di Giura, Viale Antonio Negrita, Via Giuseppe Tornielli;
- Heroes of the Risorgimento in Monteverde Vecchio and near Villa Doria Pamphili, e.g. Via Anton Giulio Barrili, Via Stefano Canzio, Via Giacinto Carini, Via Felice Cavallotti, Via Enrico Cernuschi, Via Francesco Dall'Ongaro, Via Francesco Daverio, Via Fratelli Bandiera, Via Alberto Mario, Via Luigi Mercantini, Via Benedetto Musolino, Piazza Ippolito Nievo, Piazza Rosolino Pilo, Via Carlo Pisacane, Via Alessandro Poerio, Via Maurizio Quadrio, Via Aurelio Saffi;
- Latinists, in the south-eastern part of the quarter, e.g. Via Gino Funaioli, Via Adolfo Gandiglio, Via Lorenzo Rocci, Via Vincenzo Ussani, Via Tommaso Vallauri, Via Pier Vettori;
- Local toponyms, e.g. Via Fonteiana, Viale di Villa Pamphili, Via degli Orti Gianicolensi, Via Vitellia
- Philanthropists, in the eastern part of the quarter, e.g. Via Virginia Agnelli, Via Ludovica Albertoni, Via Francesco Catel, Piazzale Enrico Dunant, Via Caterina Fieschi, Largo Martin Luther King, Via Laura Mantegazza, Via Federico Ozanam, Largo Alessandrina Ravizza, Piazza Carlo Alberto Scotti;
- Physicians, near the San Camillo-Forlanini hospital, e.g. Via Roberto Alessandri, Via Edoardo Bassini, Via Amico Bignami, Via Alessandro Codivilla, Via Pio Foà, Piazza Carlo Forlanini, Via Edoardo Jenner, Via Arcangelo Ilvento, Via Paolo Mantegazza, Via Ferdinando Palasciano, Via Raffaele Paolucci, Via Bernardino Ramazzini, Via Pietro Valdoni;
- Popes and cardinals, near Villa Doria Pamphili and San Pancrazio basilica, e.g. Via Cosimo de Torres, Via Giampaolo Della Chiesa, Via Ludovico di Monreale, Via Innocenzo X, Via Leone XIII, Via Francesco Maidalchini, Via Giuseppe Spina
- Prominent women Via di Donna Olimpia; within Villa Doria Pamphili, e.g. Viale Maria Callas, Viale Maria Carta, Viale Simone de Beauvoir, Viale George Eliot, Viale Oriana Fallaci, Viale Anna Frank, Viale Natalia Ginzburg, Viale Rosa Luxemburg, Largo Giorgiana Masi, Viale Anna Maria Mozzoni, Viale Florence Nightingale, Largo Anna Politkovskaya, Viale Clara Wieck Schumann, Viale Sorelle Bronte, Viale Sigrid Undset, Viale 8 Marzo Festa della Donna.
- Scientists and inventors in Nuovo Trastevere, e.g. Piazza Andrea Ampere, Via Jacopo Belgrado, Via Giovanni Caselli, Via Quirino Majorana, Via Giuseppe Ravizza, Via Gregorio Ricci-Curbastro.

== Places of interest ==
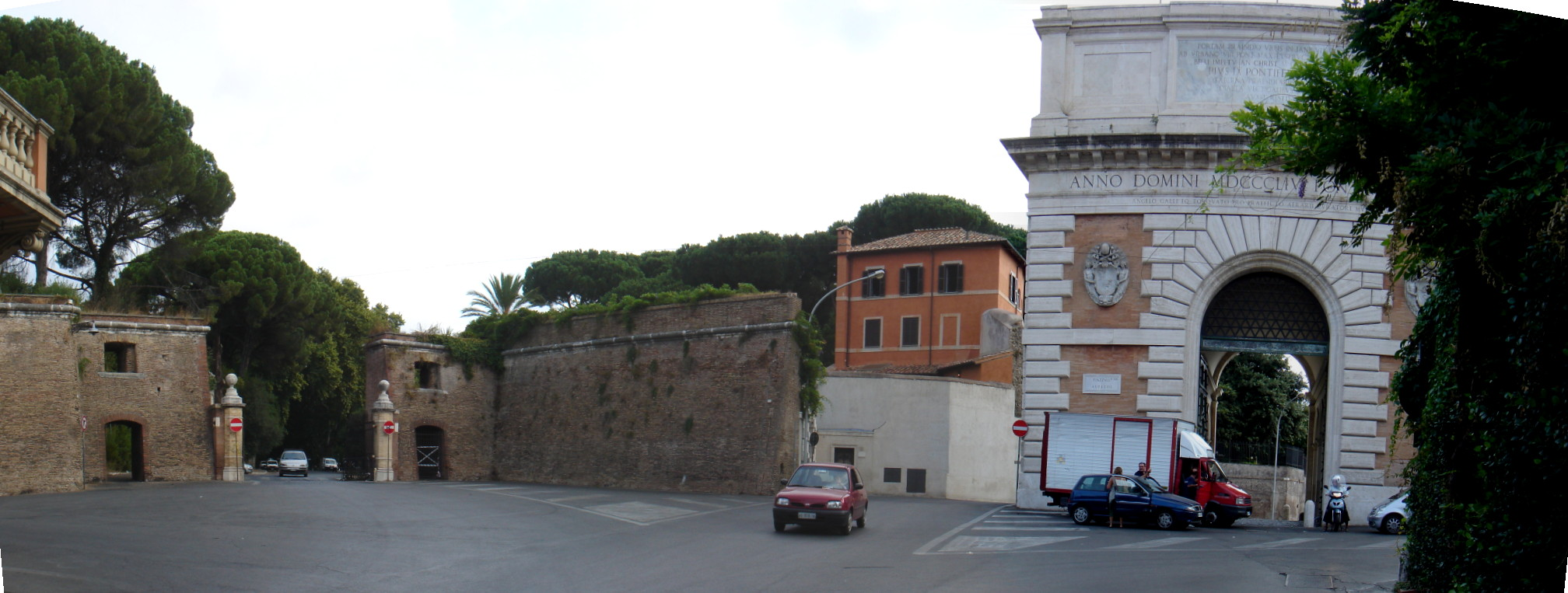
The Janiculum walls near Porta San Pancrazio

=== Civil buildings ===
- Carlo Forlanini hospital, in Via Bernardino Ramazzini (1930–35).
- Villa Santucci Maraini, in Via Bernardino Ramazzini. 19th-century Art Nouveau house.

=== Religious buildings ===
- San Pancrazio, in Piazza San Pancrazio.
- Nostra Signora de la Salette, in Piazza Madonna de la Salette. 20th-century church (1957–67).
- Nostra Signora di Coromoto
- Trasfigurazione di Nostro Signore Gesù Cristo, on Piazza della Trasfigurazione
- Santa Maria Regina Pacis a Monte Verde, in Monteverde

=== Archaeological sites ===
- Sepulchres in Via Giuseppe Ravizza. 2nd-century sepulchres.

=== Parks ===
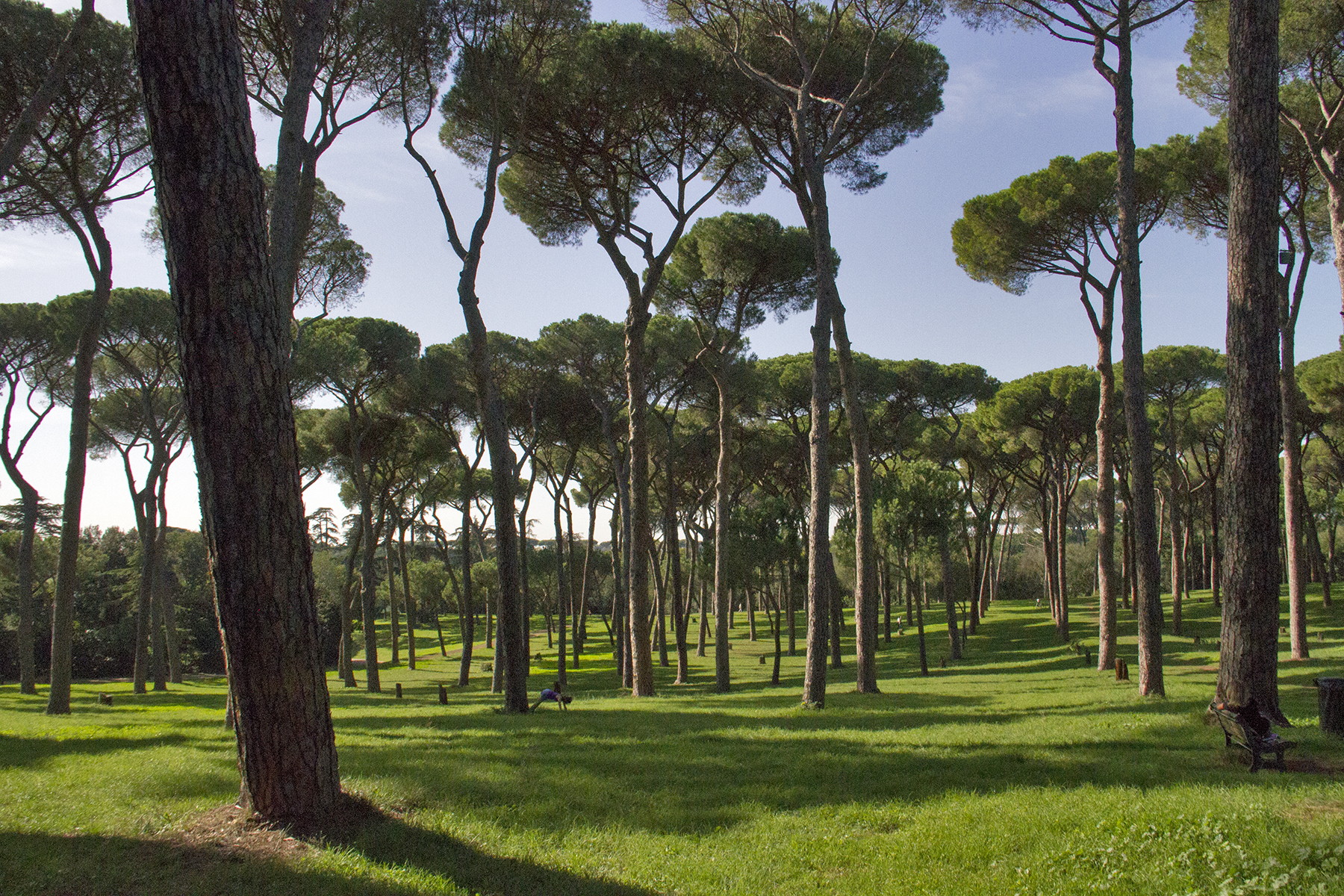
Villa Doria Pamphili

- Villa Doria Pamphili.
- Villa Baldini, in Largo Alessandrina Ravizza. 18th-century villa.
- Villa Flora or Villa Signorini, in Via Portuense. 19th-century villa.

=== Other ===
- Lazzaro Spallanzani National Institute for Infectious Diseases.
- International Museum of Cinema and Entertainment.
- Eugenio Morelli Anatomy Museum.
