= Ponte Galeria =

- Zona of Rome
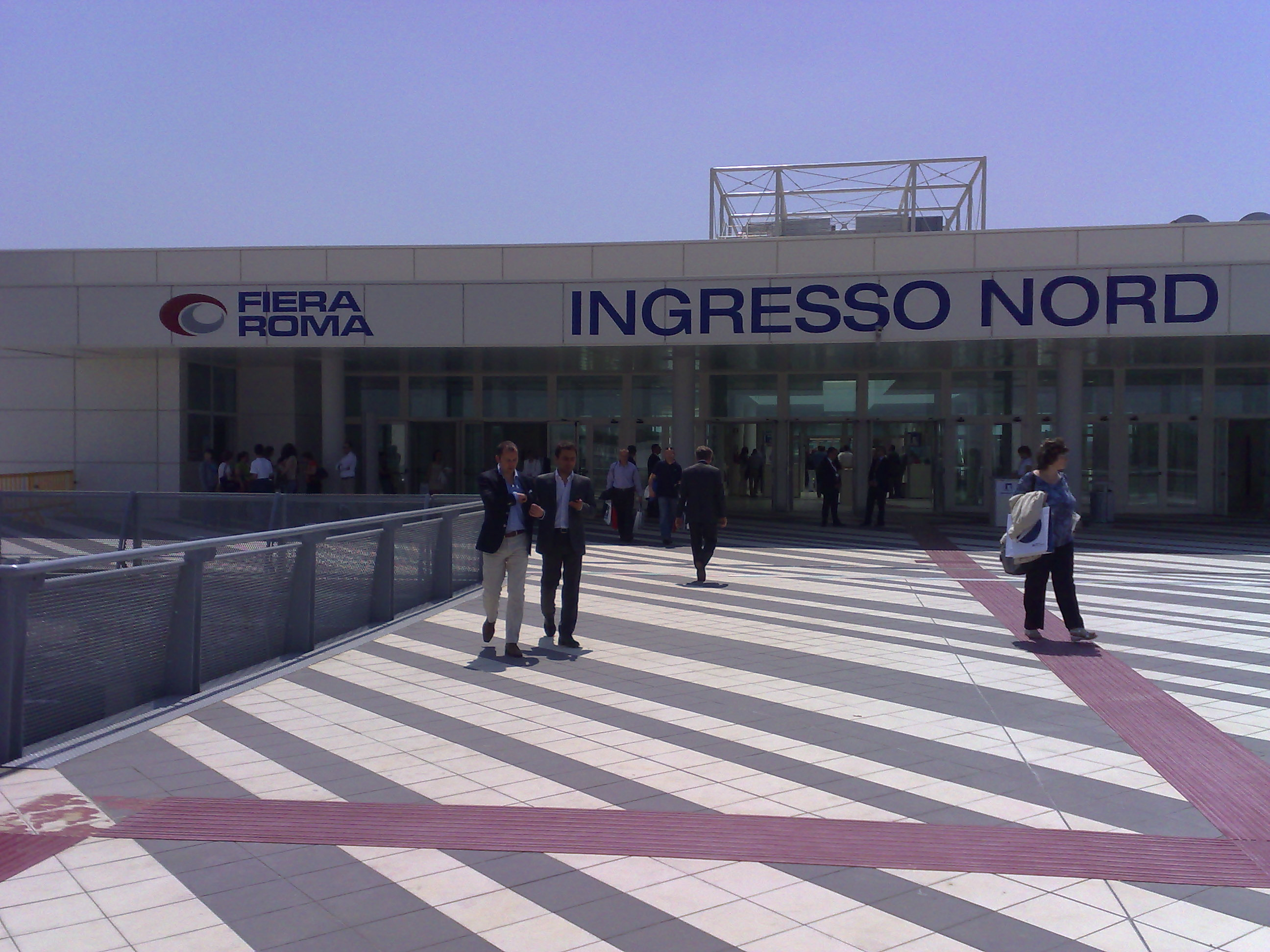
- The north entrance of Fiera di Roma.

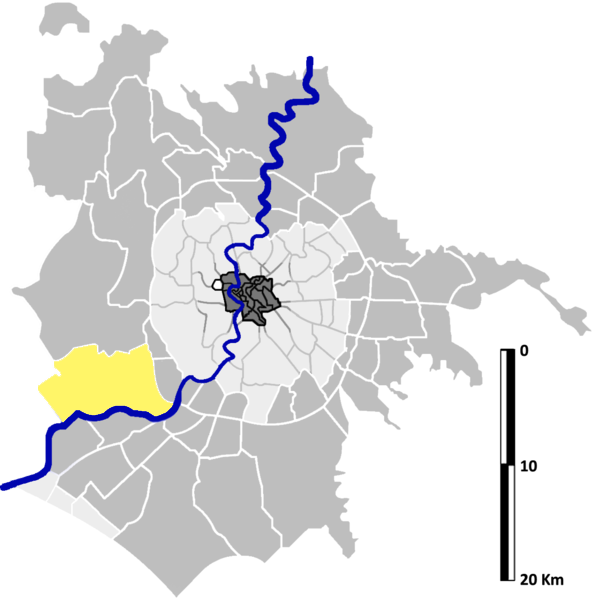
- Position of the zona within the city
- Country: Italy
- Region: Lazio
- Province: Rome
- Comune: Rome

Area
  - Total: 16.5982 sq mi (42.9891 km^{2})

Population (2016)
  - Total: 11,973
  - Density: 721.3/sq mi (278.51/km^{2})
- Time zone: UTC+1 (CET)
  - Summer (DST): UTC+2 (CEST)

Ponte Galeria is the 41st zona of Rome, Italy, identified by the initials Z. XLI. Geographically it was part of Agro Romano. The zone belongs to the Municipio XI.

== History ==
The area of Ponte Galeria, populated since the Paleolithic, is the junction between two important roads, Via Portuense and Via della Magliana, as well as between two waterways, the river Tiber and the Rio Galeria. The latter, the ancient Careia, was controlled by the Etruscans and, later, by the Romans, that left notable vestiges (the bridge, an aqueduct, a necropolis).

In the 8th century, Pope Hadrian I built here a domusculta (a large fortified farm), which was later turned into a castle by Pope Gregory IV. The following Popes too showed their interest in the area, as they ordered many times the restoration of the ancient bridge and, in order to finance the works, it was established a tribute that had to be paid by the ships that went up the river Tiber.

The Fascist regime promoted a number of development interventions, the construction of a glass industry and of a rail interchange, and promoted a massive reclamation of the area.

The zone includes a well known immigrants identification center (CIE) and the seat of the Regional Council of Lazio

== Geography ==
The territory of Ponte Galeria includes the urban zone 15 G Ponte Galeria.

=== Boundaries ===
The zone borders, to the north, with Zona Castel di Guido (Z. XLV), whose boundary is marked by Via di Monte Carnevale, Via di Castel Malnome, Via del Ponte di Malnome and Via della Pisana, up to the Grande Raccordo Anulare.

To the east, the zone borders with Zona La Pisana (Z. XLIV) and with Zona Magliana Vecchia (Z. XL), being separated from both by the stretch of the Grande Raccordo Anulare between Via della Pisana and the river Tiber.

Southward, Ponte Galeria borders with Zona Mezzocammino (Z. XXXI) and with Zona Acilia Nord (Z. XXXII): the border is outlined by the stretch of the Tiber between the Grande Raccordo Anulare and the comune of Fiumicino.

Westward, the zone borders with the municipality of Fiumicino.

=== Historical subdivision ===
The territory of Ponte Galeria includes, in addition to the frazione of the same name, three more frazioni: Piana del Sole, Ponte Galeria-La Pisana and Spallette.

=== Street names ===
Odonyms of the zone are mainly dedicated to engineers (especially hydraulic engineers, with reference to the reclamation of the area in the 1930s) and to Italian localities: in the frazione of Piana del Sole, streets are named after towns of Piedmont, while in the frazione of Spallette roads are named after towns of Sardinia. Odonyms of the zone can be categorized as follows:

- Engineers, e.g. Via Lorenzo Allievi, Via Silvio Canevazzi, Via Giuseppe Colombo, Viale Rudolf Diesel, Viale Alexandre-Gustave Eiffel, Via Luigi Negrelli, Via Giovanni Poleni, Via Cristoforo Sabbadino, Via Luigi Stipa, Via Angelo Vescovali, Via Eugenio Villoresi, Via Bernardino Zendrini;
- Local toponyms, e.g. Via del Fosso della Breccia, Via di Malnome, Via di Monte Carnevale, Via della Muratella, Via del Ponte di Malnome, Via di Ponte Galeria;
- Towns of Piedmont, e.g. Via Battifollo, Via Belforte Monferrato, Via Bergolo, Via Calamandrana, Via Canosio, Via Casalbeltrame, Via Castagnito, Via Castellinaldo, Via Collegno, Via Demonte, Via Gambasca, Via Garbagna, Via Ghemme, Via Guarene, Via Montegioco, Via Murisengo, Via Occimiano, Via Tavagnasco;
- Towns of Sardinia, e.g. Via Arzana, Via Cabras, Via Decimomannu, Via Elmas, Via Fordongianus, Via Illorai, Via Muravera, Via Narcao, Via Nulvi, Via Nuxis, Via Orroli, Via Palau, Via Samugheo, Via Santa Teresa di Gallura, Via Senorbì, Via Tergu, Via Tertenia, Via Tortolì, Via Usini.

== Places of interest ==
=== Religious buildings ===
- Chiesuola Serlupi, in Via della Chiesuola. A 17th-century chapel. 41.820881°N 12.342516°E
- Chiesa di Santa Maria Madre della Divina Grazia, in Largo Domus de Maria. A 20th-century church. 41.819583°N 12.347939°E

a parish belonging to the Roman Catholic Suburbicarian Diocese of Porto-Santa Rufina.

- Former Salesian Generalate, in Via della Pisana. 20th-century buildings (1967–69). 41.849124°N 12.372596°E

a modernist complex by architect Tommaso Valle, it also includes a chapel.

=== Military buildings ===
- Bunker, in Via della Muratella Mezzana. 41.820252°N 12.335291°E
- Caserma "Stefano Gelsomini", in Via Portuense. 21st-century buildings (2000–03). 41.805946°N 12.317644°E

Polizia di Stato barracks, dedicated to the police officer Stefano Gelsomini, who died while coming to the aid of people injured in a car crash.

=== Archaeological sites ===
- Stretch of the ancient Via Campana, near Via Gino Covre (7th century B.C.). 41.803460°N 12.316503°E
- Rural domus, in Via Alexandre Gustave Eiffel. A Republican age villa. 41.809041°N 12.332899°E
- Necropolis of Malnome, in Via della Muratella, near the crossroads with Via di Castel Malnome. 1st and 2nd-century sepulchres. 41.821713°N 12.334237°E

=== Natural areas ===
- Parco della Pace "Yitzhak Rabin", in Via di Monte Stallonara. 41.841748°N 12.348492°E
