= Torrenova (Rome) =

- Zona of Rome
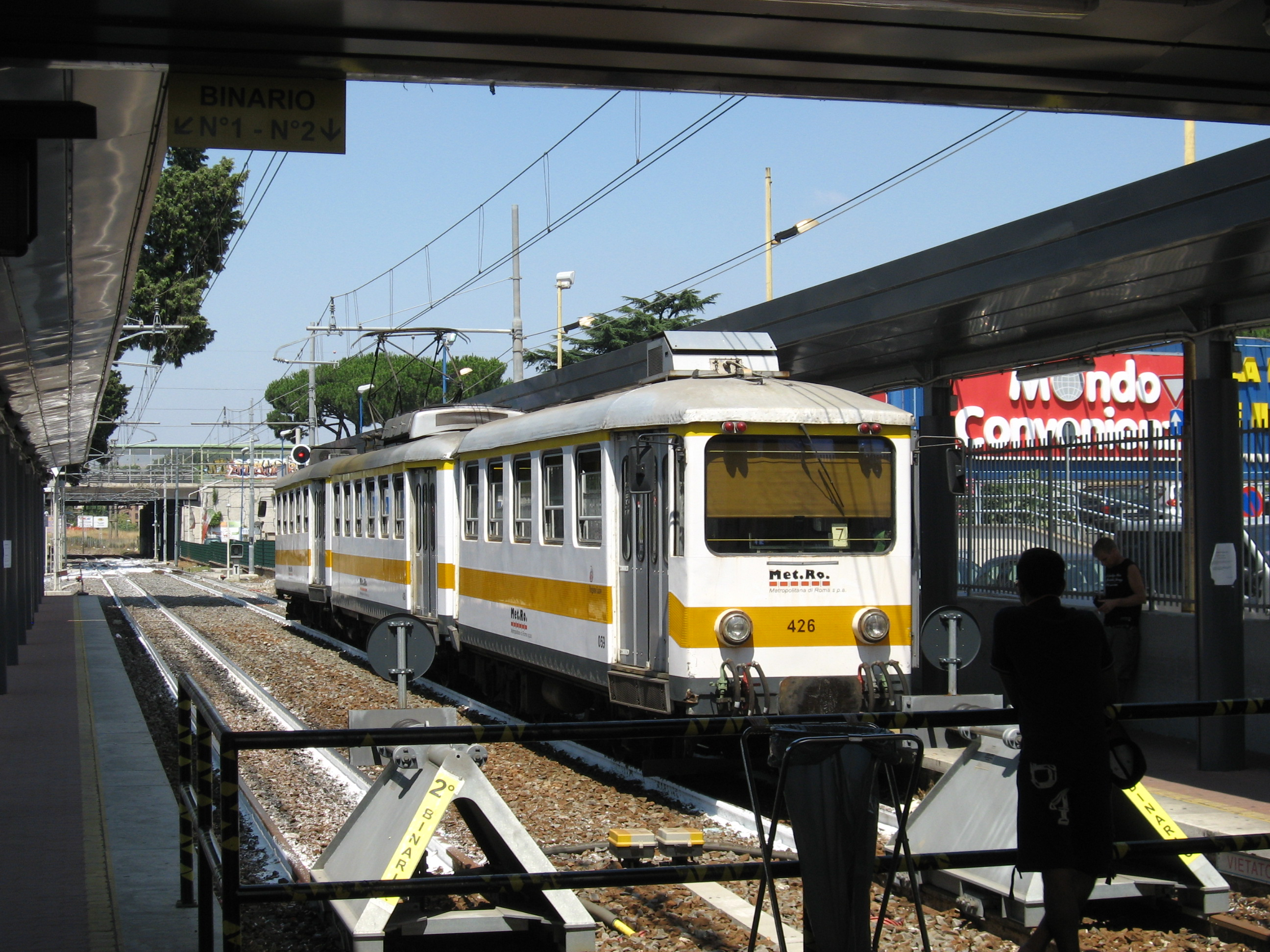
- The terminus of the Rome-Giardinetti railway.

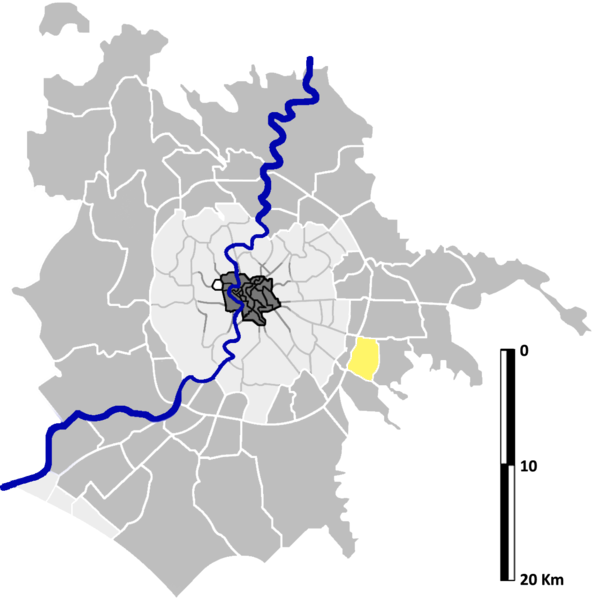
- Position of the zona within the city
- Country: Italy
- Region: Lazio
- Province: Rome
- Comune: Rome

Area
  - Total: 2.8339 sq mi (7.3397 km^{2})

Population (2016)
  - Total: 29,563
  - Density: 10,432.0/sq mi (4,027.82/km^{2})
- Time zone: UTC+1 (CET)
  - Summer (DST): UTC+2 (CEST)

Torrenova is the 16th zona of Rome, identified by the initials Z. XVI. It belongs partly to the Municipio VI and partly to the Municipio VII.

== Geography ==
The territory of Torrenova includes the urban zone 10G Romanina and the western part of the urban zones 8C Giardinetti-Tor Vergata and 10I Barcaccia.

=== Boundaries ===
Torrenova borders to the north with Zona Torre Angela (Z. XIII), from which is separated by the stretch of Via Casilina between the GRA and Via di Tor Vergata.

To the east, the zone borders with Zona Torre Gaia (Z. XVII), whose boundary is marked by the whole Via di Tor Vergata.

Southward, the zone borders with Zona Casal Morena (Z. XIX), from which is separated by the stretch of Via Tuscolana between Via di Tor Vergata and the GRA.

Westward, Torrenova borders with Zona Torre Maura (Z. XV), whose border is outlined by the stretch of the GRA between Via Tuscolana and Via Casilina.

=== Historical subdivisions ===
The territory of the zone also includes the frazioni of Giardinetti and Ponte Linari, as well as the portion of Tor Vergata located west of Via di Tor Vergata.

=== Odonymy ===
Street naming in Torrenova mainly focuses on Italian artists, sculptors and engravers (in the frazione of Giardinetti and in the area of Romanina), notable universities (in the vicinities of the University of Roma Tor Vergata) and jurists (in the area of Romanina). Odonyms dedicated to famous industrialists can be found in the area of Tor Vergata. Odonyms of the zone can be categorized as follows:

- Artists, e.g. Via Alceo Dossena, Via Giovanni Dupré, Via Maso Finiguerra, Via Federico Faruffini, Via Taddeo Landini, Via Giuseppe Maggiolini, Via Nicola da Guardiagrele, Via degli Orafi, Via Marcantonio Raimondi, Viale Luigi Schiavonetti, Via Sante Vandi, Via Lippo Vanni;
- Industrialists, e.g. Via Giuseppe Borsalino, Via Giovanni Caproni, Via Francesco Cirio, Via Benigno Crespi, Via Rodolfo Crespi, Via Angelo Motta, Via Nicola Romeo;
- Journalists, e.g. Via Giuseppe Marrazzo, Via Mario Pastore, Via Vittorio Ragusa;
- Jurists, e.g. Via Bernardino Alimena, Via Francesco Antolisei, Via Giuseppe Barile, Via Enrico Ferri, Via Raffaele Garofalo, Via Massimo Severo Giannini, Via Vincenzo Manzini, Piazza Gian Domenico Pisapia, Piazza Vincenzo Simoncelli;
- Local toponyms, e.g. Via Alenda, Via Carcaricola, Via Casamonte, Via di Giardinetti, Via Lamponiano, Via della Massa Calciana, Via del Muro Linari, Via del Ponte delle Sette Miglia, Via della Tenuta di Torrenova, Via di Tor Vergata, Via Varvariana;
- Towns of Calabria, e.g. Via Francavilla Angitola, Via Grisolia, Via Mottafollone;
- Universities, e.g. Via Cambridge, Via Columbia, Viale della Sorbona, Via Stanford.

== Places of interest ==
=== Civil buildings ===
- Torre dei Santi Quattro, in Via del Muro Linari. 12th-century tower. 41.834492°N 12.616587°E
- Castle of Torrenova, in Via Casilina. 16th-century castle.

The enlargement has been planned in 1605 by Giovanni Fontana.

- Casale di Villa Gentile, in Via Columbia. 18th-century farmstead. 41.851005°N 12.623613°E
- Casale del Dazio, in Via Casilina. 19th-century farmstead. 41.862960°N 12.613359°E

=== Religious buildings ===
- Chiesa di San Clemente, built by Giovanni Fontana in the 16th century.
- Chiesa della Resurrezione di Nostro Signore Gesù Cristo, built in 1963.
- Chiesa di San Gaudenzio a Torrenova, built in 1995.
- Santi Mario e Compagni Martiri, built in 1993.

=== Archaeological sites ===
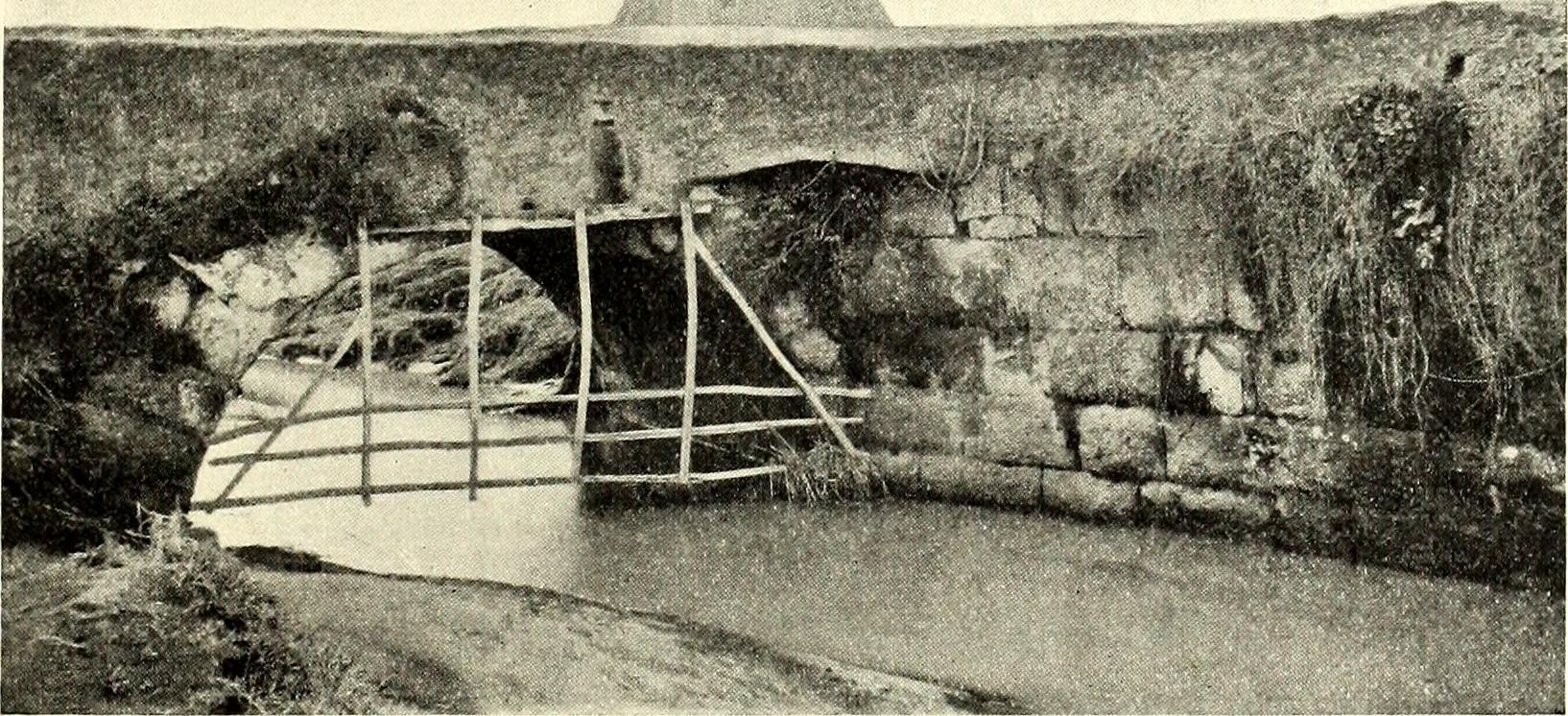
Bridge over the Fosso del Giardinetto

- Villa di Tor Vergata, in the locality of Carcaricola, near the Fosso di Santa Maura. A 2nd-century BC Roman villa 41.857297°N 12.612217°E
- Bridge of the ancient Via Labicana, in Via della Massa Calciana. A bridge that can be dated back to the 2nd century BC, over the Fosso del Giardinetto. 41.862989°N 12.612470°E
- Roman thermal baths, in Parco di Tor Vergata. 1st-century thermal baths. 41.839246°N 12.613971°E
- Remains of the Casalis Turris Virgata, in Via Columbia. Medieval fortification. 41.851038°N 12.623184°E
- Bagno della Bella Cenci, between Fosso del Giardino and Via Antonio Ingegnoli. 16th-century nymphaeum. 41.860876°N 12.614473°E

=== Parks ===
- Parco di Tor Vergata. 41.837652°N 12.6141411°E
- Parco Ivan Sbernola, between Via Carlo Santarelli and Via degli Orafi. 41.861830°N 12.607721°E
- Giardino Maurizio Notargiacomo, in Via Carcaricola. 41.859176°N 12.611915°E

=== Education ===
- ASI Science Data Center, in Via del Politecnico. 21st-century building. 41.854820°N 12.619336°E
- Università degli Studi di Roma Tor Vergata.

=== Museums ===
- Museo dell'immagine fotografica e delle arti visuali (MIFAV), in Via della Ricerca Scientifica. 41.853424°N 12.604910°E

Museum of photographic image and visual arts, located within the Maths, Physics and Natural Science of the University of Rome Tor Vergata.

== See also ==
- Administrative subdivision of Rome#Municipi

== Bibliography ==
- Marina De Franceschini (2005). L'Erma di Bretschneider (ed.). Ville dell'Agro romano. ISBN 978-88-8265-311-8.
