= Centro Storico =

- Urban zone of Rome
- Coordinates: 41.899°N 12.477°E
- Country: Italy
- Region: Lazio
- Province: Rome
- Comune: Rome
- Municipio: Municipio Roma I
- Established: 29-30 July 1977

Area
  - Total: 1.23 sq mi (3.19 km^{2})

Population (2016)
  - Total: 33,336
- Time zone: UTC+1 (CET)
  - Summer (DST): UTC+2 (CEST)

Centro Storico is the first urban zone of Rome, identified by the initials 1A. It belongs to the Municipio I and it includes the main part of the city center.

== Geography ==
Centro Storico extends, to varying degrees, over the rioni of R. II Trevi, R. III Colonna, R. IV Campo Marzio, R. V Ponte, R. VI Parione, R. VII Regola, R. VIII Sant'Eustachio, R. IX Pigna and R. XI Sant'Angelo.

The area borders:

- to the north with the urban zones 17A Prati, 2C Flaminio and 2X Villa Borghese
- to the east with the urban zones 1F XX Settembre, 1E Esquilino and 1X Zona archeologica
- to the south with the urban zone 1C Aventino
- to the southwest with the urban zone 1B Trastevere
