= Piana del Sole =

- Frazione
- Location of Piana del Sole in Italy
- Coordinates: 41°49′18″N 12°18′39″E
- Country: Italy
- Region: Lazio
- Metropolitan city: Metropolitan City of Rome Capital (RM)
- Comune: Rome

Area
  - Total: 1.61 km^{2} (0.62 sq mi)

Population (2006)
  - Total: 4,324
  - Density: 2,700/km^{2} (7,000/sq mi)
- Time zone: UTC+1 (CET)
  - Summer (DST): UTC+2 (CEST)
- Postal code: 00148
- Dialing code: 06

Piana del Sole is a frazione (zone plan B40) of Rome, located in zone Z. XLI Ponte Galeria, in the territory of Municipio XI (formerly Municipio XV).

It sits on the border with the comune of Fiumicino, enclosed between the A12 "Autostrada Azzurra" highway to the west, the A91 "Roma-Fiumicino" highway to the south and Via della Muratella to the northeast.

Archaeological excavations in the area of the Castel Malnome estate uncovered 300 graves from an Ancient Roman necropolis dating back to the second century AD.

Prehistoric and Iron Age as well as Etruscan and Ancient Roman sites can be found in the area.

== Transport ==
It can be reached from the Fiera di Roma station.

== Street names ==
The streets in the frazione are dedicated to some Piedmontese comuni and hydraulic engineers.
