= Municipio IX =

Municipio Roma IX
- Municipio of Rome
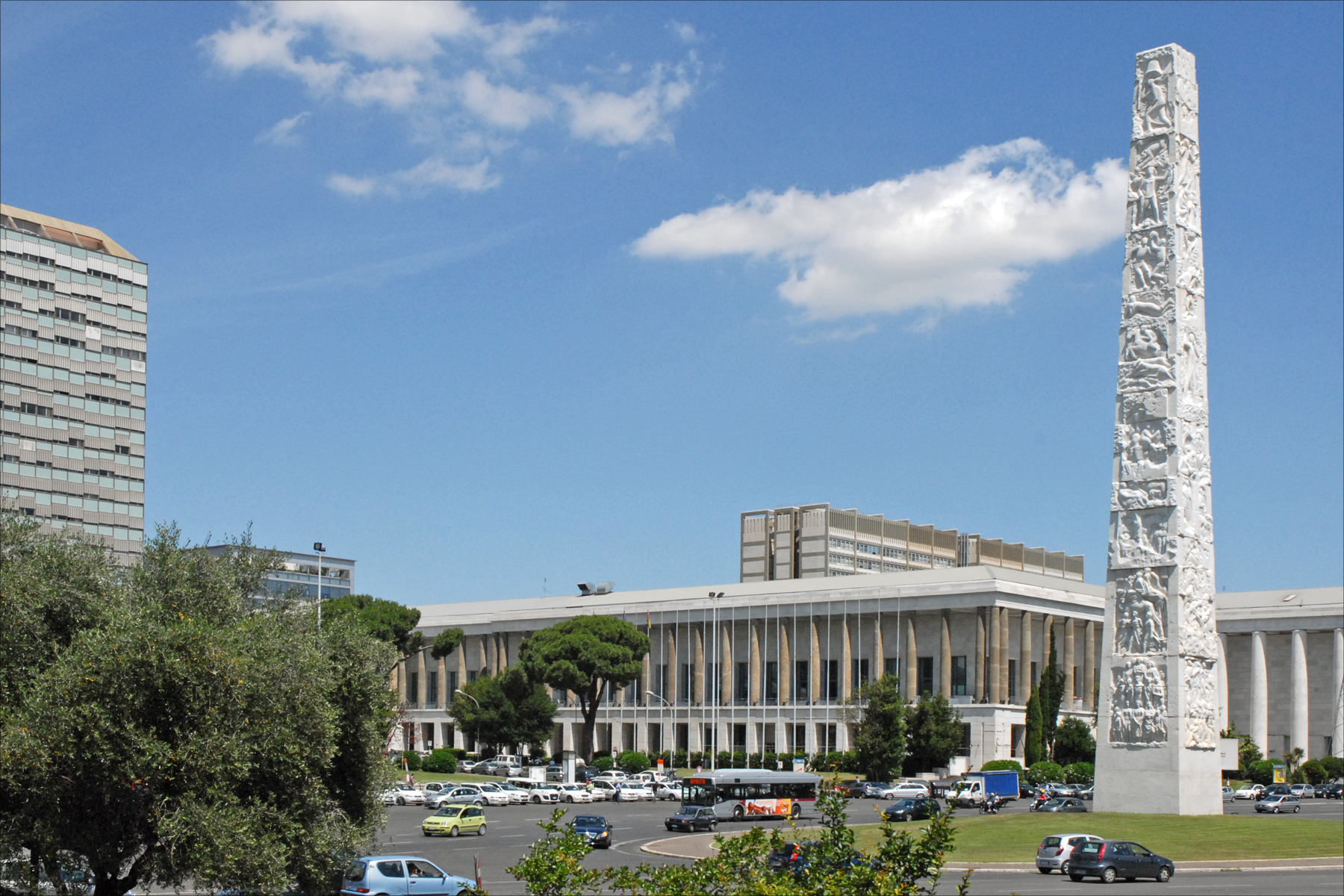
- Piazza Guglielmo Marconi and the obelisk in the EUR district.

- Flag

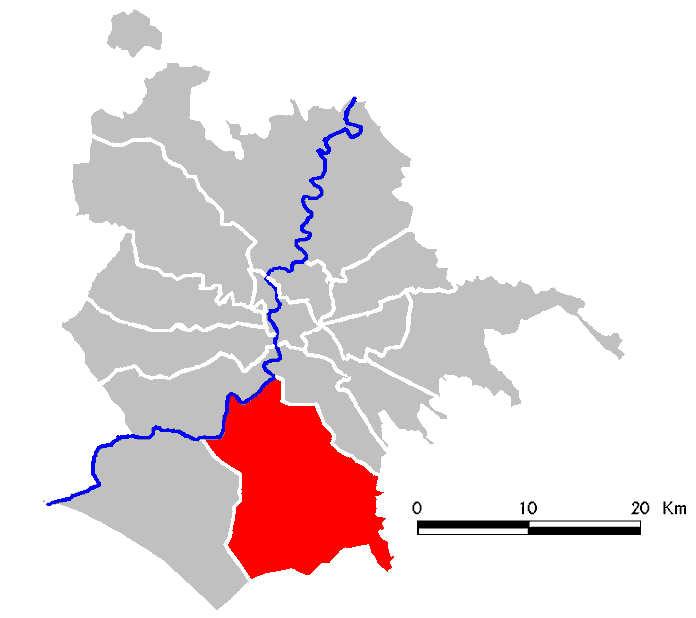
- Location of Municipio IX of Rome
- Region: Lazio
- Comune: Rome
- Established: 11 March 2013

Government
  - President: Titti Di Salvo (Democratic Party)

Area
  - Total: 183.17 km^{2} (70.72 sq mi)

Population (2016)
  - Total: 182,026
  - Density: 993/km^{2} (2,570/sq mi)
- Time zone: UTC+1 (CET)
  - Summer (DST): UTC+2 (CEST)

Municipio Roma IX is the ninth administrative subdivision of Rome (Italy).

It was established by the Capitoline Assembly with Resolution no. 11 of 11 March 2013 and replaces Municipio Roma XII (former "Circoscrizione XII").

== Geography ==
It is located in the southern area of the city and includes the Decima-Malafede and the Laurentino-Acqua Acetosa nature reserves.

=== Historical subdivisions ===
In the territory of the municipio there are the following districts of Rome:

Quarters

- Q. X Ostiense (partially), Q. XXXI Giuliano-Dalmata and Q. XXXII Europa.

Zones

- Z. XXII Cecchignola (partially), Z. XXIII Castel di Leva (partially), Z. XXIV Fonte Ostiense, Z. XXV Vallerano, Z. XXVI Castel di Decima, Z. XXVII Torrino, Z. XXVIII Tor de' Cenci, Z. XXIX Castel Porziano (partially), Z. XXXI Mezzocammino and Z. XXXIX Tor di Valle.

=== Administrative subdivisions ===
The urban subdivision of the territory includes the thirteen urban zones of the former Municipio Roma XII; the population is distributed as follows:

Municipio Roma IX (EUR)
12A EUR	9,584
12B Villaggio Giuliano	10,096
12C Torrino	40,827
12D Laurentino	24,595
12E Cecchignola	14,647
12F Mezzocammino	13,198
12G Spinaceto	24,792
12H Vallerano-Castel di Leva	29,250
12I Decima	8,478
12L Porta Medaglia	3,375
12M Castel Romano	286
12N Santa Palomba	1,533
12X Tor di Valle	15
Not localized	1,350
Total	182,026

=== Frazioni ===
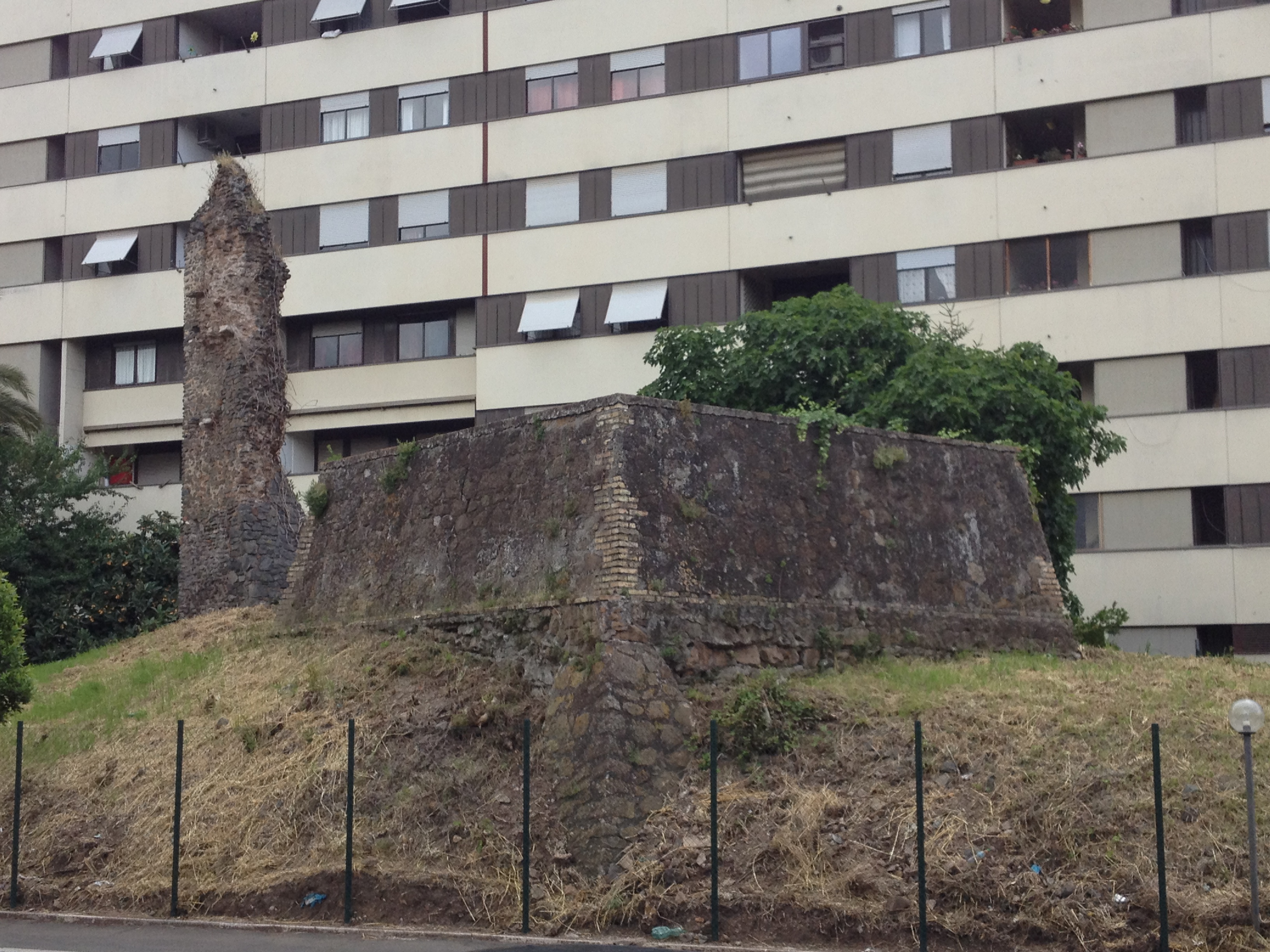
Torre Brunori in the frazione Spinaceto.

The following frazioni of Rome are included in the area of the Municipio:

- Castello della Cecchignola, Fonte Laurentina, Mostacciano, Tor de' Cenci, Spinaceto and Vitinia.

== Culture ==
=== Cinemas ===
- Eurcine, in Via Liszt.
- Stardust Village, in Via di Decima.
