= Santi Mario e Compagni Martiri =

- Church of Saints Marius and Companion Martyrs
- Chiesa dei Santi Mario e Compagni Martiri
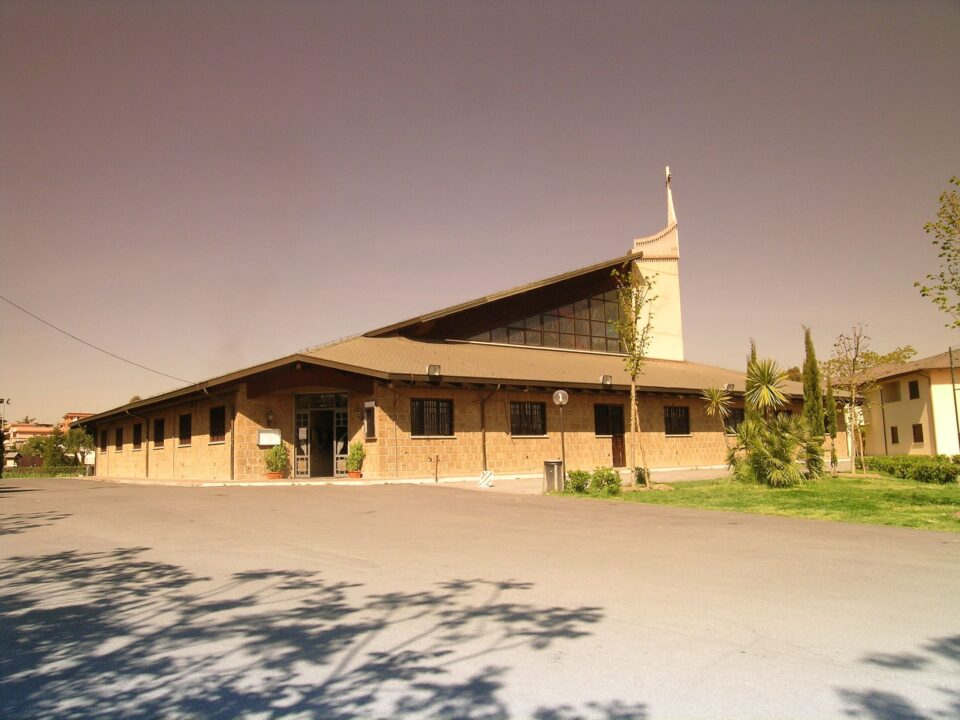

- Location within Rome
- 41°50′38″N 12°36′10″E
- Location: Via del Ponte delle Sette Miglia 245, Torrenova, Rome
- Country: Italy
- Language: Italian
- Denomination: Catholic
- Tradition: Roman Rite
- Website: parrocchiasanmario.it

History
- Status: titular church, parish church
- Dedication: Marius, Martha, Audifax, and Abachum
- Consecrated: 12 June 1993; 14 December 2008

Architecture
- Functional status: active
- Architect: Angelo Zamagna
- Architectural type: Modern
- Groundbreaking: 1989
- Completed: 1993

Administration
- Diocese: Rome

Santi Mario e Compagni Martiri is a 20th-century parochial church and titular church in southeast Rome, dedicated to Marius, Martha, Audifax, and Abachum.

== History ==
Santi Mario e Compagni Martiri was built in 1989–93 to a modernist design by Angelo Zamagna. Pope John Paul II visited in 1995.

It is named in honour of Marius, Martha, Audifax, and Abachum, a family of Persian Christians who were martyred in Rome in AD 270.

The church was badly damaged in an accidental fire on Christmas Eve 2007; it was rededicated on 14 December 2008.

On 7 December 2024, Pope Francis made it a titular church to be held by a cardinal-priest.

Cardinal-protectors

- Ignace Bessi Dogbo (2024 – present)
