= Massimina =

Urban zone in Municipio XII, Rome

Coordinates: 41.8791°N 12.3589°E

Massimina is the urban zone 16E of Municipio XII (formerly Municipio XVI) of Rome. In a separate subdivision scheme, it belongs to zone "O" 20 A-B. Massimina is included in zone XLV Castel di Guido.

Massimina is also the namesake of a frazione of Rome.

== History ==
The area is also known as Massimilla, after Via della Massimilla, one of the main streets of the neighborhood, or as Casal Lumbroso (name taken from the Via del Casale Lumbroso, a street surrounded by villas and connecting the Via Aurelia with the Grande Raccordo Anulare). Massimina developed on the southern side of the Via Aurelia, just outside the GRA, on a hilly area alternating valley floors and ridges.

The main settlement can be split into three large areas, divided by commercial buildings and private land:

- Zona del Tredicesimo or Zona del 13° (the name comes from the 13th kilometer of the Via Aurelia), whose core is formed by the three streets Via Giuseppe Vanni, Via Alessandro Santini and Via del Casale Lumbroso: the area mainly consists of small buildings and detached houses;
- Zona della Massimilla, formed by the sequence of settlements along Via della Massimilla, Via Serafino Belfanti and Via Ciro Trabalza: the area is exclusively made up of small buildings;
- Zona Ildebrando extends over the entire length of Via Ildebrando Della Giovanna: the road was private until 2001, when its lanes were enlarged and ample parking lots were built. The area consists of villas and small buildings. Via Ildebrando Della Giovanna connects Via Romano Guerra and Via Gioele Solari, another main road of the area.

In May 2009, an idea to build a football stadium for A.S. Roma was mooted but was later abandoned.

== See also ==
- Forest of Massimina — park.
