= Diocese of Yopougon =

Roman Catholic diocese in Côte d'Ivoire

Coordinates: 5°19′N 4°4′W

Diocese of Yopougon Dioecesis Yopugonensis

Location
- Country: Côte d'Ivoire
- Metropolitan: Abidjan

Statistics
- Area: 7,367 km^{2} (2,844 sq mi)
- Population: Total; Catholics: (as of 2013); 2,199,744; 950,000 (43.2%)

Information
- Rite: Latin Rite

Current leadership
- Pope: Leo XIV
- Bishop: Jean Salomon Lezoutie

The Roman Catholic Diocese of Yopougon (Latin: Yopugonen(sis)) is a diocese located in the city of Yopougon in the ecclesiastical province of Abidjan in Côte d'Ivoire.

== History ==
- June 8, 1982: Established as Diocese of Yopougon from the Metropolitan Archdiocese of Abidjan

== Special churches ==
The cathedral is the Cathédrale Saint-André in Yopougon.

== Bishops ==
- Bishops of Yopougon (Roman rite)
  - Bishop Laurent Akran Mandjo (1982.06.08 - 2015.11.28); Bishop Emeritus - Deceased
  - Bishop Jean Salomon Lezoutie (2015.11.28 - Present); formerly, Coadjutor Bishop of the same Diocese

=== Coadjutor Bishop ===
- Jean Salomon Lezoutié (2009 - 2015)

=== Other priests of this diocese who became bishops ===
- Ignace Bessi Dogbo, appointed Bishop of Katiola in 2004
- Bruno Essoh Yedoh, appointed Bishop of Bondoukou in 2019

== See also ==
- Roman Catholicism in Côte d'Ivoire
- List of Roman Catholic dioceses in Côte d'Ivoire

== Sources ==
- GCatholic.org
- Catholic Hierarchy
