= Marius, Martha, Audifax, and Abachum =

Group of Persian Christian martyrs

Saints Marius, Martha, Audifax, and Abachum
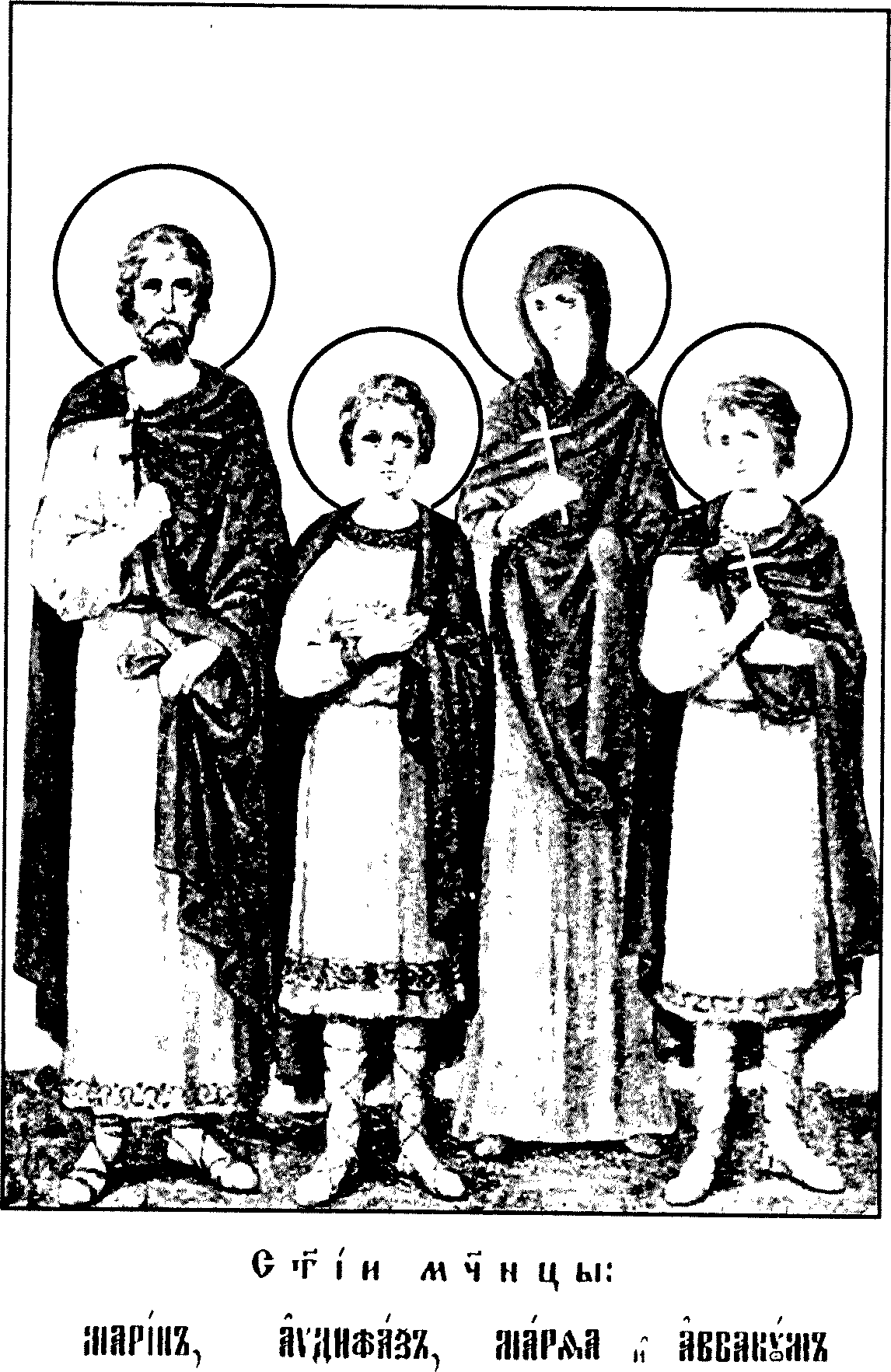
- Russian illustration: (left to right) Marius, Abachum, Martha, Audifax

Martyrs
- Born: 3rd century Parthian Empire
- Died: 270; Nymphae Catabassi, near Rome
- Venerated in: Catholic Church, Eastern Orthodox Church
- Major shrine: Rome, Prüm Abbey
- Feast: 19 January

Saints Marius, Martha, Audifax, and Abachum (died 270) were, according to their largely legendary passio of the 6th century, four saints of the same family (a married couple and their two sons). They came from Persia to Rome, and were martyred in 270 for sympathizing with Christian martyrs and burying their bodies. Some ancient martyrologies place the date of their death between 268 and 270, during the reign of Claudius II, although there was no persecution of Christians during this time.

Their story relates how the family's assistance to Christians exposed them to persecution. They were seized and delivered to the judge Muscianus or Marcianus, who, unable to persuade them to abjure their faith, condemned them to various tortures. Despite the torture, the saints refused to abjure. Marius and his two sons were thus beheaded on the Via Cornelia, and their bodies were burnt. Martha meanwhile was killed at a place called in Nimpha or Nymphae Catabassi (later called Santa Ninfa), thirteen miles from Rome. Tradition states that Martha was cast into a well.

== Veneration ==
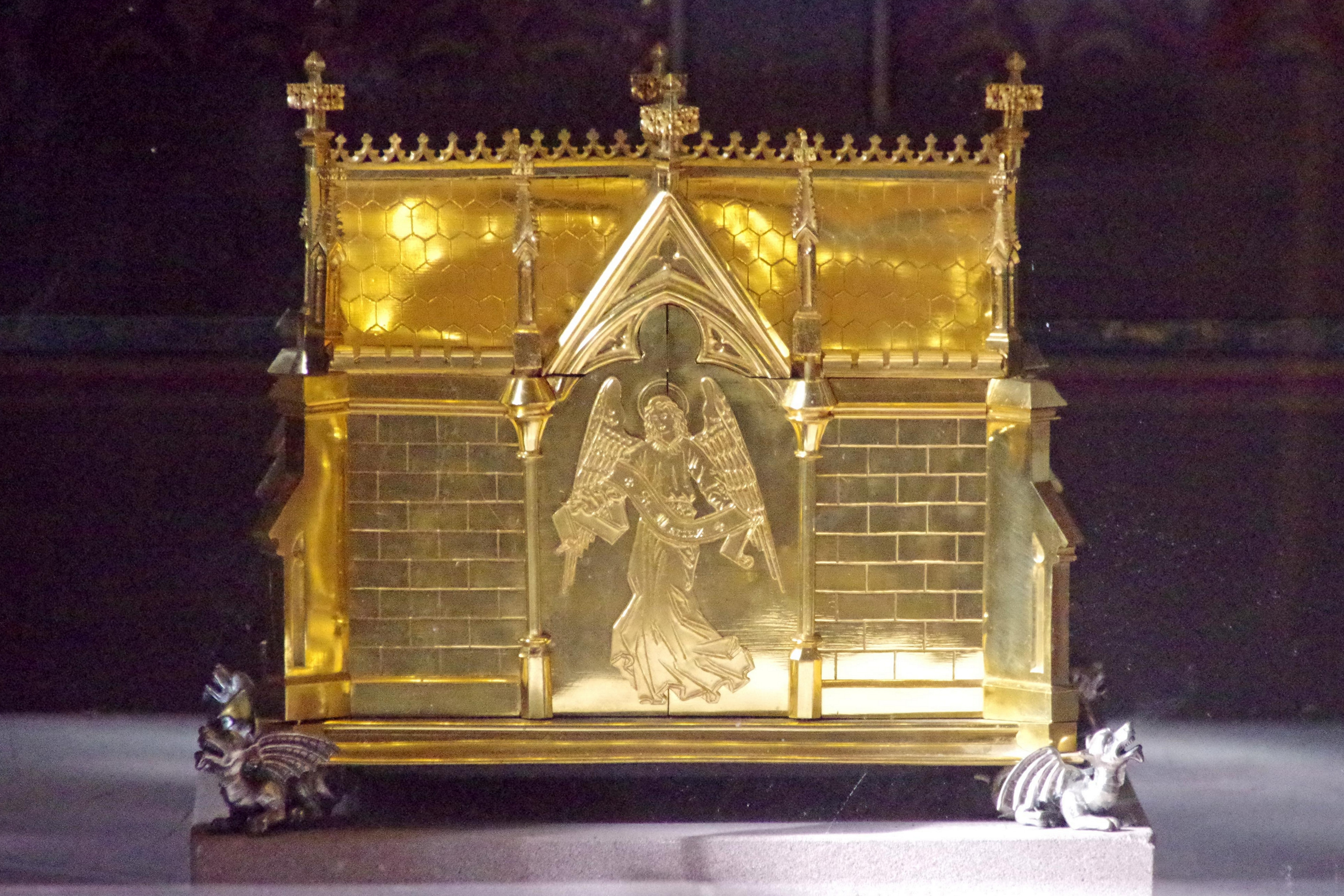
Relics in Prüm Abbey

According to tradition, a Roman lady named Felicitas secured the half-consumed remains of the father and sons and also the mother's body from the well, and had the sacred relics secretly interred on her estate at Buxus, today Boccea. This is said to have occurred on January 20. A church arose at Boccea, and during the Middle Ages, it became a place of pilgrimage.

The relics of the martyrs later suffered various vicissitudes: some were transferred to the churches of Sant'Adriano al Foro and Santa Prassede, in Rome, and part of these relics were sent to Eginhard, biographer of Charlemagne, who lodged them in the monastery of Seligenstadt. Some relics went to Prüm Abbey where their presence was recorded in the early 11th century. The original reliquary chest was destroyed during the French occupation at the end of the 18th century. The current chest dates from the 19th century.

The martyrs are inscribed in the current Roman Martyrology on 19 January. Their feast or commemoration was included on that date in the General Roman Calendar from the 9th century to 1969, when they were excluded because nothing is known with certainty about them except their names, their place of burial (the cemetery Ad Nymphas on the Via Cornelia), and the day of their burial (19 or 20 January).

The church in Rome of Santi Mario e Compagni Martiri ("Saint Marius and Companion Martyrs") is named in their honour.
