= Forest of Massimina =

The Forest of Massimina (Italian: Bosco di Massimina), is a forest located in Italy. It is a park that covers an area of about 80,000 square metres (20 acres), located in the Massimina district of Municipio XII in the city of Rome, in central Italy.

It was created in a former quarry site, that was used for gravel extraction for years, on Via Bartolomeo Chesi south of the Via Aurelia ring road in the Malagrotta area.

== Restoration ==
The habitat restoration and urban reforestation project began in 1998. The area has been completely regraded to create new hills and drainages to recover the original natural topography. It was then covered with a layer of topsoil to support a restored ecological system, using ecocelles taken from the nearby estate of Castel di Guido.

The plant species were selected to reestablish the natural environment quickly. Around 1500 new trees were planted on the site, including: 566 Quercus pubescens (downy oak, pubescent oak), 65 Quercus robur fastigiata (columnar English oak), and 562 oaks of other Quercus species; 196 Acer (maples); 96 Salix (willow); and several species of shrubs, such as: gorse, privet, myrtle, and cistus.

== Recreation ==
2 kilometres (1.2 mi) of pathways go through the forest, including a fitness trail. The recreation area has benches, picnic tables, and a children's playground.

== See also ==
- Parks in Rome
- Environmental restoration
- Reforestation topics
- Restoration ecology
