= Administrative subdivisions of Rome =

Administrative, urbanistic and historic or toponomastic subdivisions

Municipi of Rome
- The fifteen Rome municipi
- Category: Local government districts
- Location: Rome
- Created: 19 January 2001
- Number: 15 (as of 2013)
- Populations: 130,000–300,000
- Areas: 20–180 km^{2}
- Government: President and Municipal Council(s)

The city of Rome, Italy, is divided into first-level administrative subdivisions.

There are 15 municipi (sing.: municipio) in the city; each municipio is governed by a president and a council who are elected directly by its residents every five years. The municipi collectively comprise the comune of Rome, which is itself one of the constituent parts of the wider Metropolitan City of Rome Capital.

== History ==
On 31 March 1966, for administrative purposes and to increase decentralization, the territory of the comune of Rome was divided into 12 administrative areas, called circoscrizioni (singular: circoscrizione). On 11 February 1972 those areas were increased to 20.

On 6 March 1992, after the referendum that ratified the separation of the then Circoscrizione XIV from Rome and the birth of the new independent comune of Fiumicino, the number of administrative areas of Rome decreased to 19.

On 19 January 2001, circoscrizioni which were renamed municipi and the direct election of a President to head each municipio was established.

On 11 March 2013, Rome City Council decided to merge some of the municipi, reducing their number to 15 and giving them a new numeration.

== Municipi ==
Municipio	Population 31 December 2015	Area in km^{2}	Density per km^{2}	Map
Municipio I – Historical Center	186,802	19.91	9,382	The 15 Municipi of Rome
Municipio II – Parioli/Nomentano	167,736	19.60	8,567	The 15 Municipi of Rome
Municipio III – Monte Sacro	204,514	97.82	2,091	The 15 Municipi of Rome
Municipio IV – Tiburtina	177,084	49.15	3,603	The 15 Municipi of Rome
Municipio V – Prenestino/Centocelle	246,471	27.00	9,137	The 15 Municipi of Rome
Municipio VI – Roma Delle Torri	256,261	113.40	2,261	The 15 Municipi of Rome
Municipio VII – Appio-Latino/Tuscolano/Cinecittà	307,607	46.80	6,580	The 15 Municipi of Rome
Municipio VIII – Appia Antica	131,082	47.29	2,772	The 15 Municipi of Rome
Municipio IX – EUR	180,511	183.17	985	The 15 Municipi of Rome
Municipio X – Ostia/Acilia	230,544	150.64	1,530	The 15 Municipi of Rome
Municipio XI – Arvalia/Portuense	154,871	70.90	2,185	The 15 Municipi of Rome
Municipio XII – Monte Verde	140,996	73.12	1,928	The 15 Municipi of Rome
Municipio XIII – Aurelia	133,813	66.93	1,949	The 15 Municipi of Rome
Municipio XIV – Monte Mario	190,513	131.30	1,451	The 15 Municipi of Rome
Municipio XV – Cassia/Flaminia	158,561	186.70	849	The 15 Municipi of Rome

=== Presidents of the municipi ===
For the current legislature (2021–2026), presidents of Rome's municipi are:

N.	President	Party	Mayoral majority
I	Lorenza Bonaccorsi	PD	check
II	Francesca Del Bello	PD	check
III	Paolo Emilio Marchionne	PD	check
IV	Massimiliano Uberti	PD	check
V	Mauro Caliste	PD	check
VI	Nicola Franco	Fdl	
VII	Francesco Laddaga	PD	check
VIII	Amedeo Ciaccheri	SI	check
IX	Titti Di Salvo	PD	check
X	Mario Falconi	PD	check
XI	Gianluca Lanzi	PD	check
XII	Elia Tomassetti	PD	check
XIII	Sabrina Giuseppetti	PD	check
XIV	Marco Della Porta	PD	check
XV	Daniele Torquati	PD	check

== Urban subdivision of Rome ==
The comune of Rome is also composed of 155 urban zones (zone urbanistiche), conceived as a subdivision of the municipi, which were established in 1977 for statistical and city planning purposes on the basis of urban homogeneity criteria. Boundaries were drafted taking account of the discontinuities in Rome's urban pattern The urban zones are identified by an alphanumeric code that consists of a letter and of the number of the municipio where the zone was located: indeed, the municipi were reduced from 20 to 15 in 2013, but the alphanumeric codes were not revised.

- Municipio I: 1A Centro Storico, 1B Trastevere, 1C Aventino, 1D Testaccio, 1E Esquilino, 1F XX Settembre, 1G Celio, 1X Archeological zone, 17A Prati, 17B Della Vittoria, 17C Eroi;
- Municipio II: 2A Villaggio Olimpico, 2B Parioli, 2C Flaminio, 2D Salario, 2E Trieste, 2X Villa Borghese, 2Y Villa Ada, 3A Nomentano, 3B San Lorenzo, 3X Università, 3Y Verano
- Municipio III: 4A Monte Sacro, 4B Val Melaina, 4C Monte Sacro Alto, 4D Fidene, 4E Serpentara, 4F Casal Boccone, 4G Conca d'Oro, 4H Sacco Pastore, 4I Tufello, 4L Aeroporto dell' Urbe, 4M Settebagni, 4N Bufalotta, 4O Tor San Giovanni
- Municipio IV: 5A Casal Bertone, 5B Casal Bruciato, 5C Tiburtino Nord, 5D Tiburtino Sud, 5E San Basilio, 5F Tor Cervara, 5G Pietralata, 5H Casal de' Pazzi, 5I Sant'Alessandro, 5L Settecamini
- Municipio V: 6A Torpignattara, 6B Casilino, 6C Quadraro, 6D Gordiani, 7A Centocelle, 7B Alessandrina, 7C Tor Sapienza, 7D La Rustica, 7E Tor Tre Teste, 7F Casetta Mistica, 7G Centro Direzionale Centocelle, 7H Omo
- Municipio VI: 8A Torrespaccata, 8B Torre Maura, 8C Giardinetti-Tor Vergata, 8D Acqua Vergine, 8E Lunghezza, 8F Torre Angela, 8G Borghesiana, 8H San Vittorino
- Municipio VII: 9A Tuscolano Nord, 9B Tuscolano Sud, 9C Tor Fiscale, 9D Appio, 9E Latino, 10A Don Bosco, 10B Appio-Claudio, 10C Quarto Miglio, 10D Pignatelli, 10E Lucrezia Romana, 10F Osteria del Curato, 10G Romanina, 10H Gregna, 10I Barcaccia, 10L Morena, 10X Ciampino
- Municipio VIII: 11A Ostiense, 11B Valco San Paolo, 11C Garbatella, 11D Navigatori, 11E Tor Marancia, 11F Tre Fontane, 11G Grottaperfetta, 11X Appia Antica Nord, 11Y Appia Antica Sud
- Municipio IX: 12A Eur, 12B Villaggio Giuliano, 12C Torrino, 12D Laurentino, 12E Cecchignola, 12F Mezzocammino, 12G Spinaceto, 12H Vallerano-Castel di Leva, 12I Decima, 12L Porta Medaglia, 12M Castel Romano, 12N Santa Palomba, 12X Tor di Valle
- Municipio X: 13A Malafede, 13B Acilia Nord, 13C Acilia Sud, 13D Palocco, 13E Ostia Antica, 13F Ostia Nord, 13G Ostia Sud, 13H Castel Fusano, 13I Infernetto, 13X Castel Porziano
- Municipio XI: 15A Marconi, 15B Portuense, 15C Pian Due Torri, 15D Trullo, 15E Magliana, 15F Corviale, 15G Ponte Galeria
- Municipio XII: 16A Colli Portuensi, 16B Buon Pastore, 16C Pisana, 16D Gianicolense, 16E Massimina, 16F Pantano di Grano, 16X Villa Pamphili
- Municipio XIII: 18A Aurelio Sud, 18B Val Cannuta, 18C Fogaccia, 18D Aurelio Nord, 18E Casalotti di Boccea, 18F Boccea
- Municipio XIV: 19A Medaglie d'Oro, 19B Primavalle, 19C Ottavia, 19D Santa Maria della Pietà, 19E Trionfale, 19F Pineto, 19G Castelluccia, 19H Santa Maria di Galeria
- Municipio XV: 20A Tor di Quinto, 20B Acquatraversa, 20C Tomba di Nerone, 20D Farnesina, 20E Grotta Rossa Ovest, 20F Grotta Rossa Est, 20G Giustiniana, 20H La Storta, 20I Santa Cornelia, 20L Prima Porta, 20M Labaro, 20N Cesano, 20O Martignano, 20X Foro Italico

== Historical subdivisions of Rome ==
Map of the subdivisions of Rome: rioni ("districts") quartieri ("neighborhoods") suburbi ("suburbs") zone dell'agro romano ("areas of Agro romano")

Rome is also divided into 116 non-administrative units, called comprensori toponomastici (toponymic districts), which are organized into four groups:

- 22 rioni located in the historic centre of the city, mostly within the Aurelian Walls, except for Prati and Borgo;
- 35 quartieri surrounding the historic centre of Rome outside the Aurelian Walls;
- 6 suburbi located in the suburban area of the city;
- 53 zone in the countryside of the comune.

=== List of historic Rioni in Rome's centre ===
The rioni originate from the Regiones of ancient Rome, which evolved in the Middle Ages into the medieval rioni. In the Renaissance, under Pope Sixtus V, they reached again the number of fourteen, and their boundaries were finally defined under Pope Benedict XIV in 1743.

A new subdivision of the city under Napoleon was ephemeral, and there were no sensible changes in the organisation of the city until 1870 when Rome became the capital of Italy. The needs of the new capital led to an explosion both in the urbanisation and in the population within and outside the Aurelian Walls. In 1874 a fifteenth rione, Esquilino, was created on the newly urbanised zone of Monti. At the beginning of the 20th century other rioni where created (the last one was Prati – the only one outside the Walls of Pope Urban VIII – in 1921). Afterward, for the new administrative subdivisions of the city the name "quartiere" was used. Today all the rioni are part of the first Municipio, which therefore coincides completely with the historical city (Centro Storico).

A map of Rome's historic center with its rioni

Rione	Name	Population (2016)
R. I	Monti	13,028
R. II	Trevi	2,327
R. III	Colonna	2,111
R. IV	Campo Marzio	5,860
R. V	Ponte	3,596
R. VI	Parione	2,572
R. VII	Regola	3,328
R. VIII	Sant'Eustachio	1,962
R. IX	Pigna	10,737
R. X	Campitelli	552
R. XI	Sant'Angelo	1,084
R. XII	Ripa	2,520
R. XIII	Trastevere	19,229
R. XIV	Borgo	2,954
R. XV	Esquilino	24,167
R. XVI	Ludovisi	1,612
R. XVII	Sallustiano	2,225
R. XVIII	Castro Pretorio	5,341
R. XIX	Celio	2,519
R. XX	Testaccio	8,088
R. XXI	San Saba	3,531
R. XXII	Prati	15,270
Rioni	Total	186,802

=== List of Rome's quartieri ===
Quarters of Rome

- Q. I Flaminio
- Q. II Parioli
- Q. III Pinciano
- Q. IV Salario
- Q. V Nomentano
- Q. VI Tiburtino
- Q. VII Prenestino-Labicano
- Q. VIII Tuscolano
- Q. IX Appio-Latino
- Q. X Ostiense
- Q. XI Portuense
- Q. XII Gianicolense
- Q. XIII Aurelio
- Q. XIV Trionfale
- Q. XV Della Vittoria
- Q. XVI Monte Sacro
- Q. XVII Trieste
- Q. XVIII Tor di Quinto
- Q. XIX Prenestino-Centocelle
- Q. XX Ardeatino
- Q. XXI Pietralata
- Q. XXII Collatino
- Q. XXIII Alessandrino
- Q. XXIV Don Bosco
- Q. XXV Appio Claudio
- Q. XXVI Appio-Pignatelli
- Q. XXVII Primavalle
- Q. XXVIII Monte Sacro Alto
- Q. XXIX Ponte Mammolo
- Q. XXX San Basilio
- Q. XXXI Giuliano-Dalmata
- Q. XXXII EUR
- Q. XXXIII Lido di Ostia Ponente
- Q. XXXIV Lido di Ostia Levante
- Q. XXXV Lido di Castel Fusano

=== List of Rome's suburbi ===
There are currently 6 suburbi with a discontinuous numbering, since some of the original suburbs were established as quartieri in 1961, following to the urban development of the city.

- S. I Tor di Quinto
- S. VII Portuense
- S. VIII Gianicolense
- S. IX Aurelio
- S. X Trionfale
- S. XI Della Vittoria
