= XX Settembre =

- Urban zone of Rome
- Position of the zona urbanistica within the city of Rome
- Country: Italy
- Region: Lazio
- Metropolitan City: Rome
- Comune: Rome
- Municipio: Municipio I
- Established: 30 July 1977

Area
  - Total: 0.54 sq mi (1.4 km^{2})

Population (2010)
  - Total: 10,670
- Time zone: UTC+1 (CET)
  - Summer (DST): UTC+2 (CEST)

XX Settembre is an urban zone of Rome, Italy, identified by the initials 1F.

It takes its name from the main road, Via Venti Settembre, established on 30 November 1871 and dedicated to the day in 1870 when Italian troops, led by General Raffaele Cadorna, entered Rome through a breach in the Aurelian Walls near Porta Pia.
