= Municipio VI =

Municipio VI di Roma
- Municipio of Rome
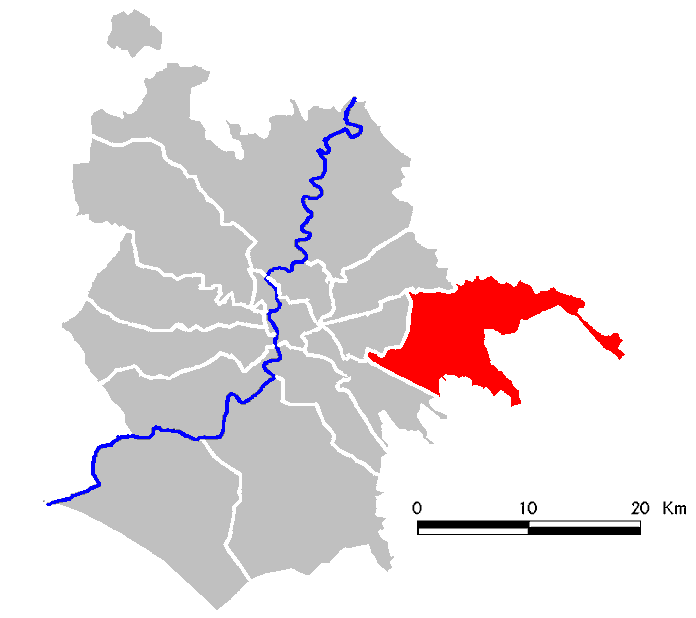
- Location of Municipio VI of Rome
- Country: Italy
- Region: Lazio
- Comune: Rome
- Established: 2013

Government
  - President: Nicola Franco (Brothers of Italy)

Area
  - Total: 113 km^{2} (44 sq mi)

Population (2021)
  - Total: 257,534
  - Density: 2/km^{2} (5.2/sq mi)
- Time zone: UTC+1 (CET)
  - Summer (DST): UTC+2 (CEST)

Municipio VI (or Municipality 6) is one of the 15 administrative subdivisions of the city of Rome in Italy. It is in the eastern part of the capital.
