= Silvio Canevazzi =

Italian civil engineer and applied mathematician (1852–1918)

Silvio Canevazzi (16 March 1852, Saliceta San Giuliano, suburb of Modena – 13 March 1918, Bologna) was an Italian civil engineer and applied mathematician.

Canevazzi studied at the mathematics faculty of the University of Modena from 1868 to 1870 and then at the Polytechnic University of Milan, where he graduated in 1873 with a degree in civil engineering. In 1873 he was appointed an assistant to the professor in the chair of applied mechanics in civil engineering at the Sapienza University of Rome, and then an assistant to the chair of construction of bridges and roads. In 1875 he won a competition in engineering sponsored by the royal corps of mining engineers and was sent by the Italian ministry of agriculture to study at the school of mines in Liège, where he graduated in 1877. In 1877, Cesare Razzaboni, who was organizing a school of engineering (Scuola di applicazione per ingegneri) in Bologna, invited Canevazzi to take charge of applied mechanics in civil engineering. In that academic post at Bologna, Canevazzi in 1880 was appointed to the chair of bridge construction and civil engineering hydraulics and also to the chair of applied mechanics in civil engineering. He held the two academic chairs until his death. In 1889 he was appointed the director of the academic department to which his two academic chairs were subordinated. In 1911 he was appointed director of the school of engineering in Bologna.

Canevazzi's research dealt with molecular equilibria in static mechanics, applications of the Menabrea theorem in elasticity, and studies of reinforced concrete. He developed a new method of calculating static stresses for buildings in earthquake zones. His method influenced building codes for earthquake resistance. Canevazzi, in collaboration with Cesare Ghillini, did important research on mechanical stresses on the human skeleton, particularly the femur. Their research was useful in the design of prosthetic limbs.

He was an Invited Speaker of the ICM in 1908 in Rome. Pier Luigi Nervi was his student.
