= Municipio XII =

Coordinates: 41°53′35″N 12°28′58″E

Municipio XII di Roma
- Municipio of Rome
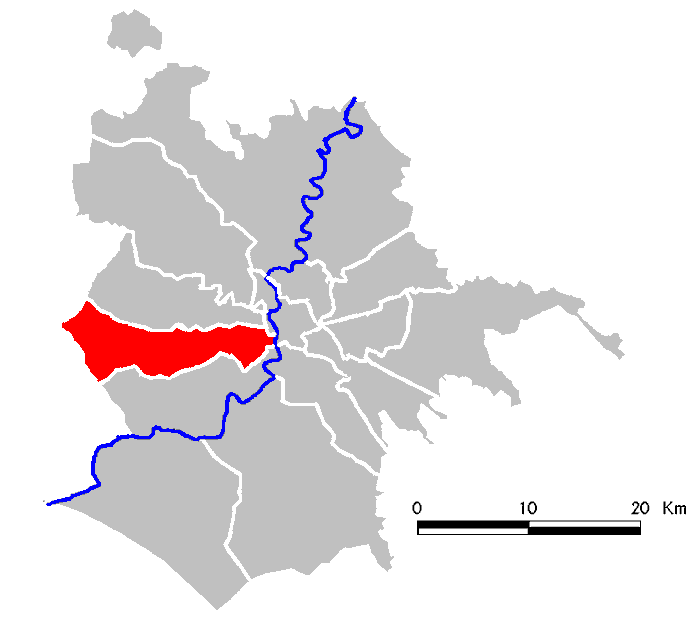
- Location of Municipio XII of Rome
- Country: Italy
- Region: Lazio
- Comune: Rome
- Established: 2013

Government
  - President: Elio Tomassetti (Democratic Party)

Area
  - Total: 73.1 km^{2} (28.2 sq mi)

Population (2010)
  - Total: 142,983
  - Density: 1,955/km^{2} (5,060/sq mi)
- Time zone: UTC+1 (CET)
  - Summer (DST): UTC+2 (CEST)

Municipio XII is an administrative subdivision of the city of Rome. It was first created by Rome's City Council on 19 January 2001 and it has a president who is elected during the mayoral elections.

Originally called Municipio XVI, since 11 March 2013 its borders were modified and its name became Municipio XII.

== Subdivision ==
Municipio XII is divided into 7 urban zones:

Locality	Inhabitants; 31 December 2010
16a Colli Portuensi	36,970
16b Buon Pastore	31,628
16c Pisana	3,932
16d Gianicolense	56,214
16e Massimina	8,093
16f Pantano di Grano	5,112
16x Villa Pamphili	374
Not localized	660

== Politics ==
Current allocation of seats in the Municipio XII's parliamentary body as of the 2013 Rome municipal election:

- Democratic Party (PD) 14
- People of Freedom (PdL) 4
- Left Ecology Freedom 2
- Five Star Movement (M5S) 2
- Others 3

In May 2013 Cristina Maltese (PD) was elected president. The current majority is formed by Democratic Party and Left Ecology Freedom.

== See also ==
- Massimina
- Forest of Massimina — park.
