= Pietro Valdoni =

Italian surgeon (1900–1976)

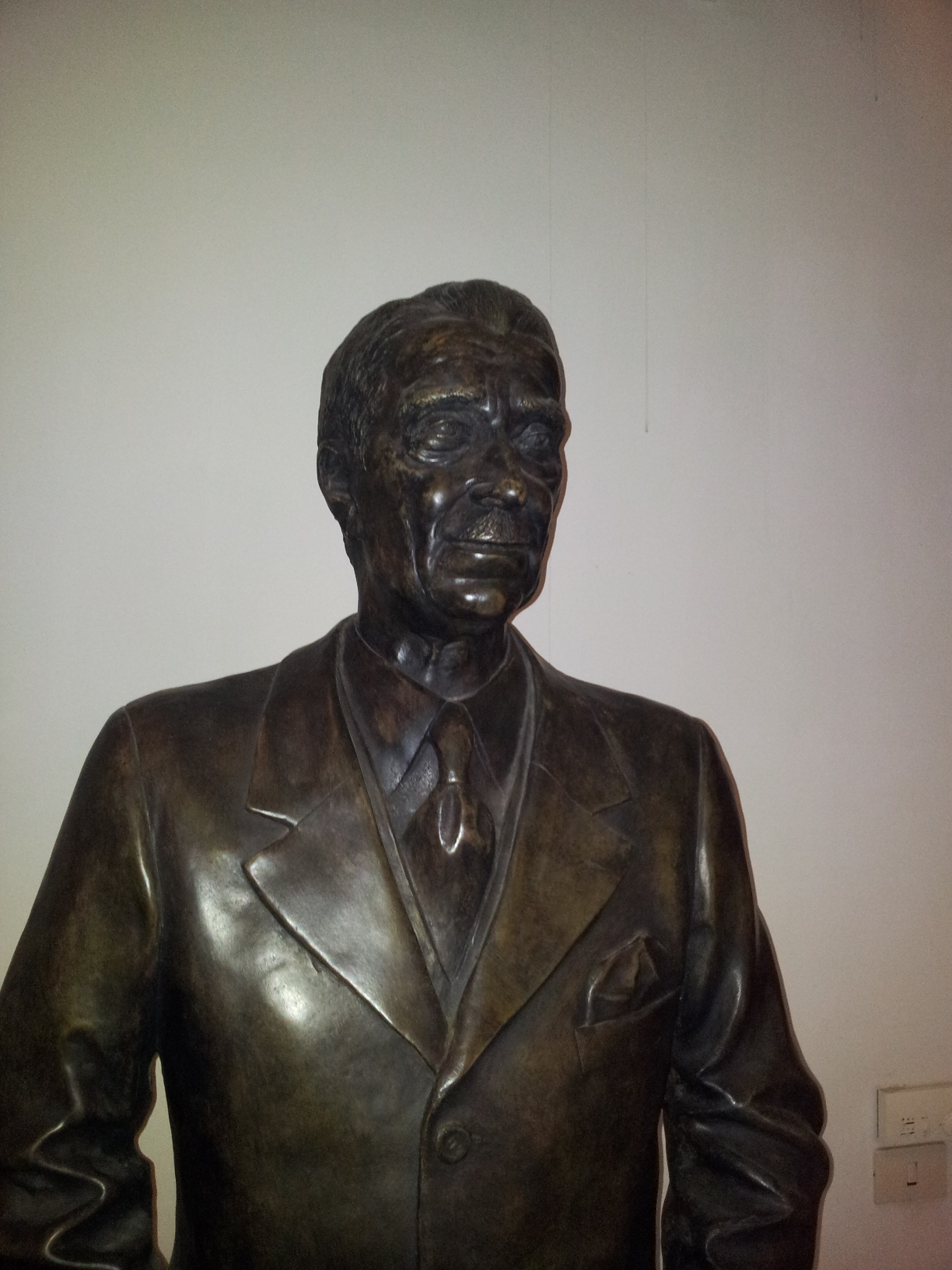
- Pietro Valdoni's bust by the sculptor Antonio Berti
- Born: February 22, 1900; Trieste
- Died: November 23, 1976 (aged 76)
- Known for: Pulmonary lobectomy, Tetralogy of Fallot, mitral commissurotomy, cardiopulmonary bypass, open-heart operations, operation for esophageal cancer
- Scientific career
- Fields: Medicine and Surgery
- Workplaces: Rome, Bologna, Vienna

Pietro Valdoni (February 22, 1900 - November 23, 1976) was a clinical surgeon and professor at Sapienza University of Rome, known for innovative surgical methods.

== The character ==
The statement “You are born as a surgeon, but then you have to become one” summarizes his view of the surgical profession. For Valdoni, surgery was not only a profession but also a personal vocation, and he regarded each operation not merely as a clinical routine but as an opportunity to apply technical skill and judgment in the treatment of patients. Throughout his career, he balanced innovation with caution, emphasizing that technical decisions should be guided by what was most appropriate for patients rather than by personal ambition or the desire for experimentation. His students described him as demanding and disciplined; although known for his strictness, he maintained close relationships with his trainees and emphasized availability, precision, and a strong sense of professional responsibility.

== Biography and career ==
Pietro Valdoni was born in Trieste on February 22, 1900, when his land was still under the Habsburg control and in 1918, having completed his high school studies in his hometown, enrolls in the faculty of Medicine and Surgery at the University of Vienna.

Two years after the end of the Great War (1914-1918) Valdoni decides to continue his studies in Italy by moving to Bologna where he attends his third year (1920-1921). His student odyssey ends in Rome where he graduates with honors in 1924 with a thesis on orthopedic clinic which competed for the prize of the Girolami Foundation.

In 1925 he becomes assistant at the Surgical Clinic in Rome directed by Professor Roberto Alessandri. Shortly after, he became a permanent assistant in the clinic, a position he held until the 28th of October 1939. In those years he obtains two important awards: the enrollment in the honor roll of assistants (14 March 1933) and the scientific industriousness award for 1934-1935, 1935-1936, 1936-1937. His membership in the Fascist Party was inevitable for the reconfirmation of his positions. In 1938 he is called to teach in a Surgical Clinic in Cagliari and, having ranked first in the competition for the Chair of Surgical Pathology at the University of Sassari, the following year he is called to Modena and Reggio Emilia. In 1941 during the Second World War he is called to direct the Institute of Surgical Pathology in Florence where he remained until the end of 1944. In this period he starts to write his “Surgical Pathology Manual” published in Milan in 1951. In 1945 he finally returns to Rome as Professor of Surgical Pathology and fifteen years later (1959-1970) as director of the Surgical Clinic. After the attack of the 14th of July 1948 to the secretary of the Italian Communist Party Palmiro Togliatti, Pietro Valdoni performs a thoracotomy for the extraction of a bullet and saves his life. Holder of the chairs of special surgical pathology, general surgical clinic and therapy from 1946 to 1970, Valdoni actively collaborates in the specialization schools in surgery, thoracic surgery, gastroenterology, liver and metabolic diseases, orthopedics, traumatology, oncology and infectious diseases.

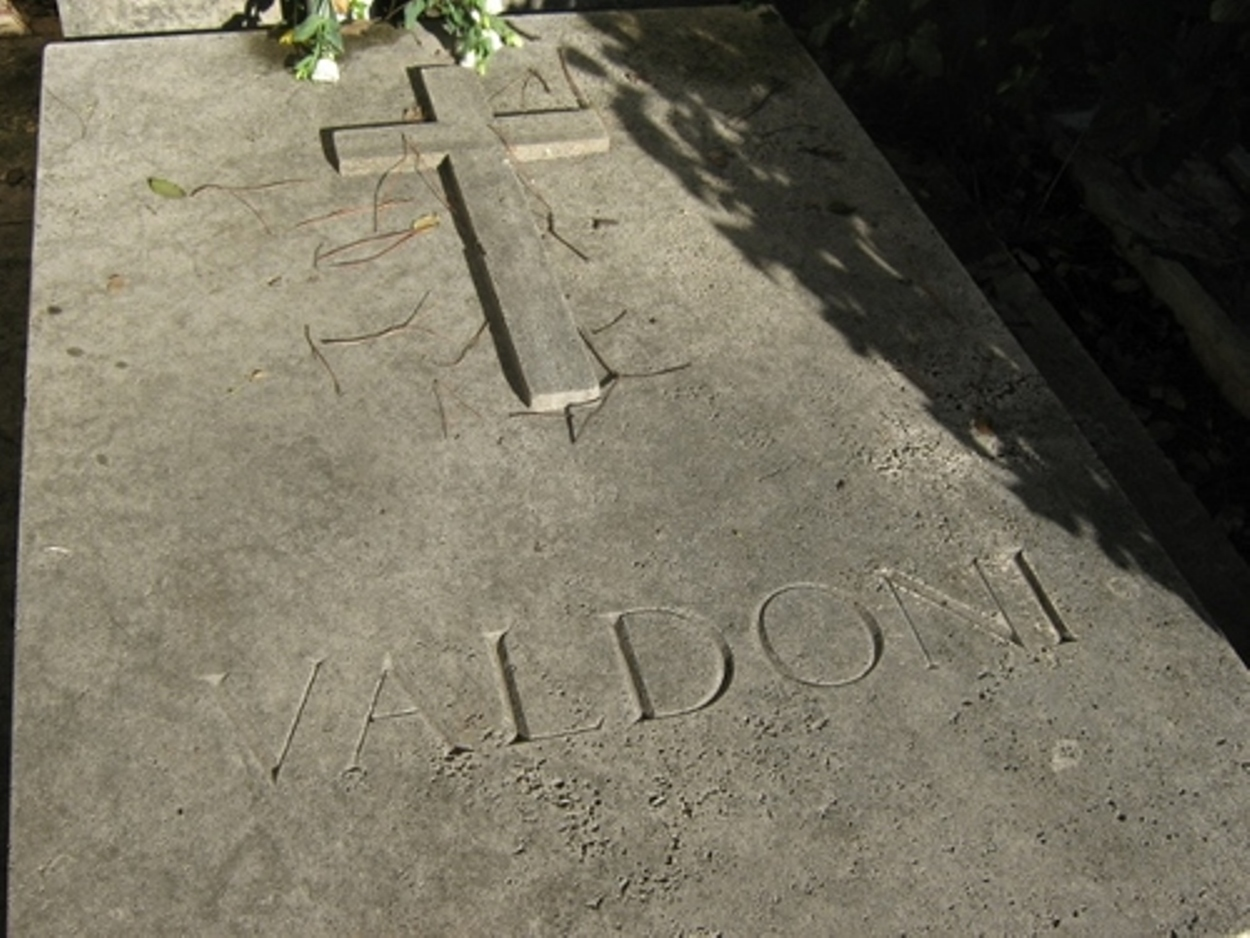
Pietro Valdoni's tomb

Under his direction from 1948 to 1970, the Roman Surgical Clinic is totally renovated even in the spaces. In 1959 in Rome as director of the Surgical Clinic, claiming that it was no longer structurally competitive and inadequate to the progression he wanted to impose in the sector, he requests and obtains funds from the Ministry of Public Works to build a new surgical clinic equipped with the most modern equipment which will open in 1960 showing to be a model of functionality. The new building of the Surgical Clinic and two classrooms of the old building are dedicated to him. Valdoni perceived on the one hand the importance of modern diagnostic techniques, equipping his institute with a modern service of radiology and nuclear medicine, histopathology and endoscopy; on the other hand the urgency of innovative teaching methods exploiting the potential of surgical cinema. In 1959 his documentary “Open heart intracardiac Surgery” was awarded by the jury of the IV Review of specialized Cinematography.

Valdoni, throughout his long career, publishes numerous scientific writings and books, and received honorary degrees and accolades from various foreign medical faculties. Professor Valdoni also becomes President of the Italian Society of Surgery and President of the Superior Health Council.

From his first marriage to Margherita De Grisogono, who died prematurely of cancer in 1963, Valdoni has five children: Rosanna, Marina, Pietro Giorgio, Francesco and Laura. In 1968 he marries Vera Lodi in second marriage. In 1970, having reached the age limits, he leaves all the public offices, including the school he founded, and retires from the profession. The great surgeon dies in 1976 of lung cancer, self-diagnosed and treated with a therapy he himself developed.

== The surgeon ==
Pietro Valdoni was an Italian surgeon known for his contributions to several fields of surgery. His work covered multiple organ systems, including the gastroenteric, cardiovascular, urinary, and respiratory systems.

Already in 1935 his intervention of pulmonary embolectomy became a national event. Valdoni was also known throughout the world for his closed-heart and then open-heart operations, then hypothermia and extracorporeal circulation. In order to see Valdoni's operations, surgeons from all over the world came to Rome, such as the American Blalock, and the surgeon Christiaan Barnard started to talk about heart transplants, especially in South Africa.

In 1939 he was the first one in Europe to engage in the ligation of the Botallo arterial duct responsible for the so-called “blue disease”. In the 1940s he performed operations for pulmonary tuberculosis, pleural empyema, vertebral tuberculosis and his first pulmonary lobectomy. The first cases of complex congenital heart disease operations follow, such as the Tetralogy of Fallot. Then, again the first in Italy, he performs a mitral commissurotomy according to the Blalock technique and he begins to use cardiopulmonary bypass to perform heart operations. In the early fifties it was time for the first radical cancer operations of the esophagus and he performed a spinal cord transposition operation (Pott disease). Not to mention the huge number of endocrine surgical operations, neurosurgery and pelvic surgery: hepatic, pancreatic, gastro-enteric and renal operations always bringing innovative techniques.

== The school ==
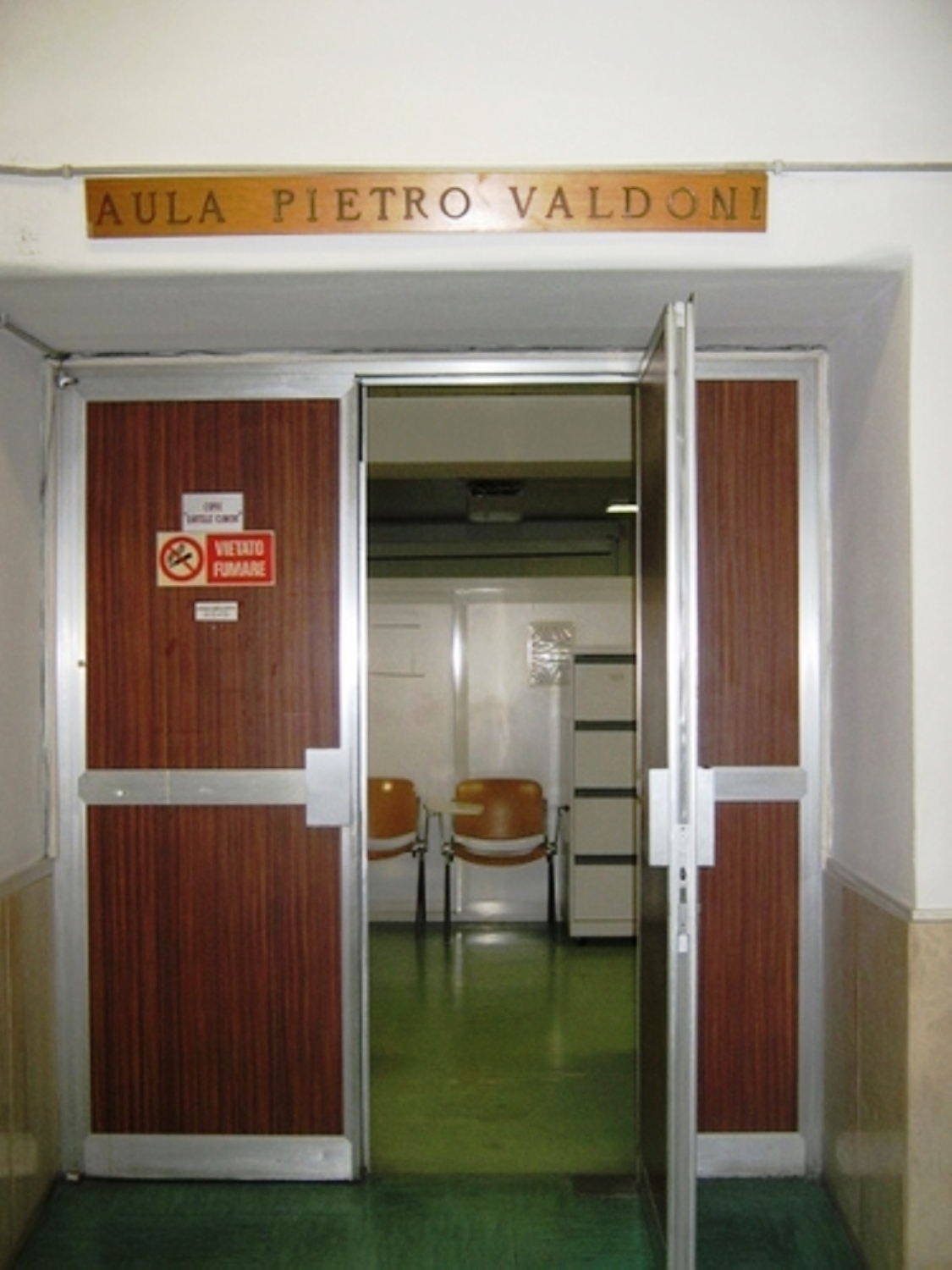
Pietro Valdoni's hall

Pietro Valdoni developed an approach that emphasized surgery as both a professional discipline and an organizational model. He argued that progress in surgery depended not only on technical innovation in the operating theatre but also on structured teamwork, coordination among specialists, and effective organization of clinical work. He supported a departmental and interdepartmental model of surgery based on collaboration. Under his direction, the Institute at Policlinico Umberto I expanded to include multiple departments, operating rooms, radiological laboratories, a general medicine clinic, a library, and other facilities. Within this institutional framework, Valdoni contributed to the development of gastroenterological, thoracic, vascular, visceral, and cardiac surgery.

Together with the Turin-based surgeon Achille Mario Dogliotti, Valdoni contributed to the development of modern surgery in Italy, which he practiced from 1956 until his retirement in 1970. Surgeons trained in Valdoni’s school included Paolo Biocca, known for work in thoracic and pulmonary surgery, and Luciano Provenzale, who later worked in general and cardiac surgery.

== Bibliography ==
- Gaudio C., Mantova E., 2016. "Pietro Valdoni: l'uomo, il chirurgo, l'innovatore". Roma: Nuova Cultura
- Himetop, The History of Medicine Topographical Database
- Italian Annals of Surgery: Surgical Personality Pietro Valdoni
- Treccani Encyclopedia: "VALDONI, Pietro" https://www.treccani.it/enciclopedia/pietro-valdoni_%28Dizionario-Biografico%29/
