= Spinaceto =

Coordinates: 41°47′05″N 12°26′32″E

Spinaceto is the urban area 12g of Municipio IX of the city of Rome. It is part of the area Z. XXVIII Tor de 'Cenci. The toponym "Spinaceto" was used for the first time in 1536.

The population is 25,000.

== Education ==
The Pier Paolo Pasolini public library is in Spinaceto.
