= Municipio XI =

Municipio XI di Roma
- Municipio of Rome
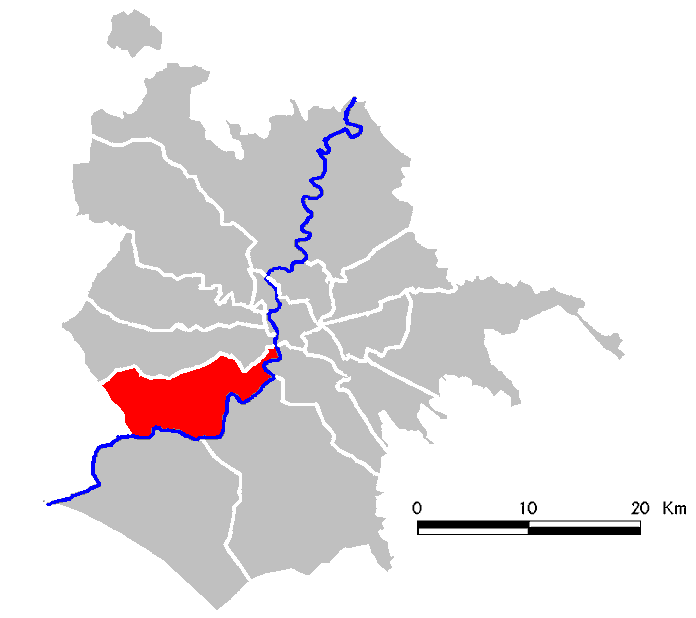
- Location of Municipio XI of Rome
- Country: Italy
- Region: Lazio
- Comune: Rome
- Established: 2013

Government
  - President: Gianluca Lanzi (Democratic Party)

Population (2016)
  - Total: 155,586
- Time zone: UTC+1 (CET)
  - Summer (DST): UTC+2 (CEST)

Municipio XI (or Municipality 11) is one of the 15 administrative subdivisions of the city of Rome in Italy.
