= Madonna and Child with a Man =

Painting by Bramantino

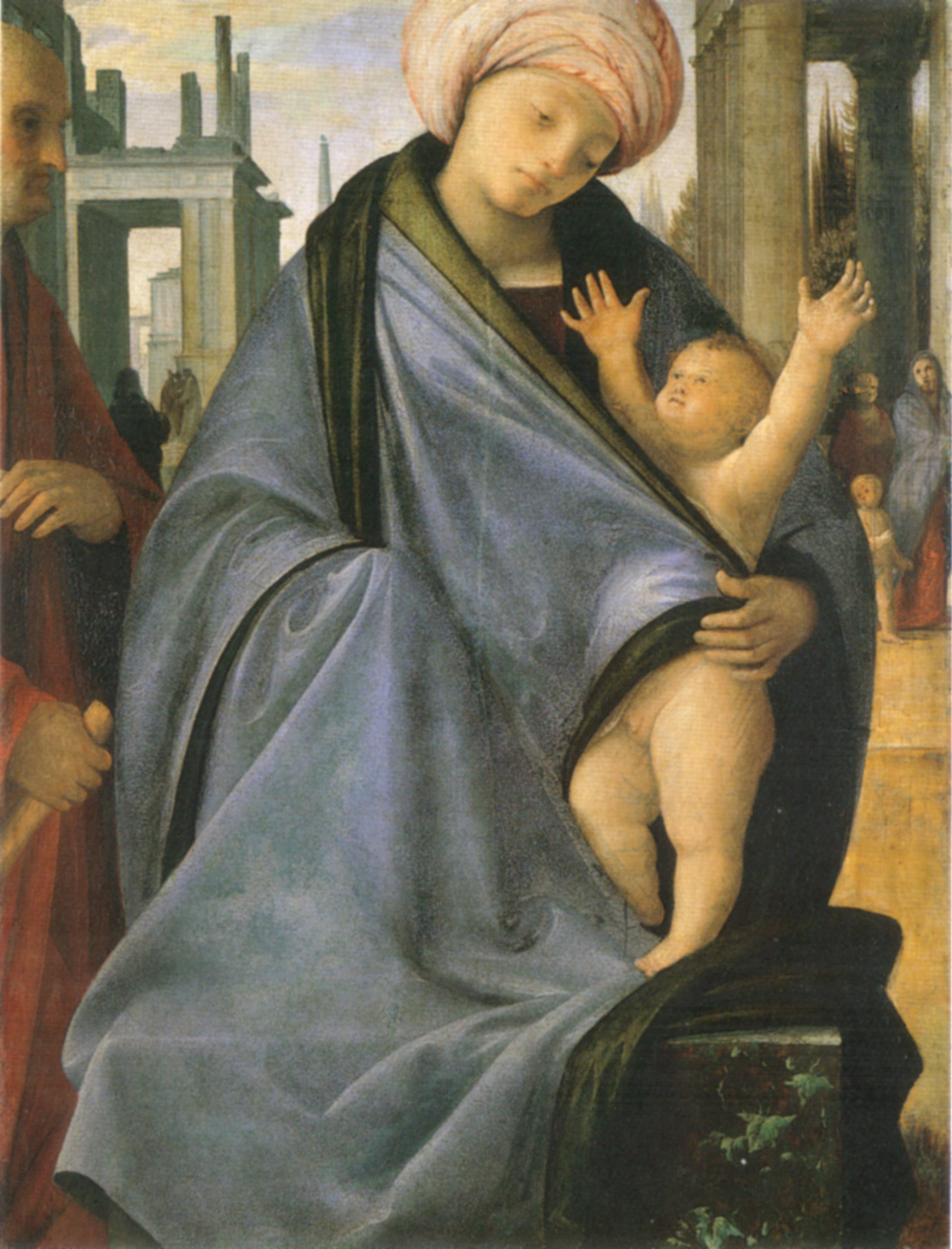
- Artist: Bramantino
- Year: c. 1503–1504
- Type: Oil painting on panel
- Location: Pinacoteca di Brera, Milan
- Accession: 1896

Madonna and Child with a Man or Madonna and Child with a Male Figure is an oil painting on panel of c. 1503–04 by the Italian Renaissance painter Bramantino in the Pinacoteca di Brera in Milan, which it entered in 1896. The painting had previously been in the collection of cardinal Cesare Monti, left to the Archdiocese of Milan in 1650. Its previous provenance is unknown, though its small dimensions suggest that it was intended for private devotion.

X-ray examination of the work has shown that the male figure to the left was repainted from Saint Joseph into a portrait, possibly of the artist's most important patron Gian Giacomo Trivulzio, by comparison with the portrait on Trivulzio's sarcophagus in the Trivulzio Chapel in the church of San Nazaro in Brolo.
