= 2006 Rome Metro crash =

Railway incident in Rome, Italy

Coordinates: 41.89460°N 12.50463°E

On 17 October 2006 at 9:37am local time (07:37 UTC), one Rome Metro train ploughed into another train as it unloaded passengers at the Vittorio Emanuele underground station in the city centre, killing a 30-year-old Italian woman, named Alessandra Lisi, and injuring about 145 others, of which a dozen were reported to be in life-threatening conditions.

The whole Line A was immediately shut down and the area above the station, the Piazza Vittorio Emanuele II, was cordoned off by police as rescue workers erected a field hospital, where dozens of people were treated. The injured were gradually transported to various Rome hospitals for further treatment, with the Complesso Ospedaliero San Giovanni - Addolorata, being the nearest, receiving most of them.

Several passengers reported that the driver of the moving train failed to stop at a red signal and that the train had been running strangely at previous stations. On 18 October, a senior driver disclosed that the moving train had previously had braking problems on a test drive. However, at a city council meeting on 19 October, mayor Walter Veltroni reported that the crash investigation revealed that the brakes were fully functional at the time of the crash.

One theory put forward was that the accident was caused by a misunderstanding between the driver and the control centre, which would have authorized the train to proceed to the "next station", meaning a station closed to the public (Manzoni), the last before Vittorio Emanuele station, while the driver would have understood it to mean the next working station, that is, Vittorio Emanuele itself. Specifically, upon reaching the red light prior to the station the driver would have been authorized by the control centre to "Andare a vista" (go by sight). This authorization allows drivers to pass red lights, provided they limit their speed to 15 kilometers per hour and are prepared to stop if needed.

The investigation concluded that the moving train was travelling at a speed of 42 kilometers per hour rather than 15. The driver of the moving train was prosecuted for his role in the crash, and in 2016 a Rome court sentenced him to 5 years in prison.

== See also ==
- 2006 in rail transport
