= Victor Emmanuel =

Victor Emmanuel may refer to:

- Victor Emmanuel I (1759–1824), Duke of Savoy and King of Sardinia
- Victor Emmanuel II (1820–1878), King of Sardinia and later King of Italy
- Victor Emmanuel III (1869–1947), King of Italy

== See also ==
- Prince Vittorio Emanuele, Count of Turin (1870–1946)
- Vittorio Emanuele, Prince of Naples (1937–2024)
- Víctor Manuel (born 1947), Spanish singer
- Altare della Patria or National Monument to Victor Emmanuel II, a building in Rome, Italy
- Vittorio Emanuele (Rome Metro), a train station in Rome
