= Porta Alchemica =

Building in Rome, Italy

Alchemical Door
- Porta Alchemica
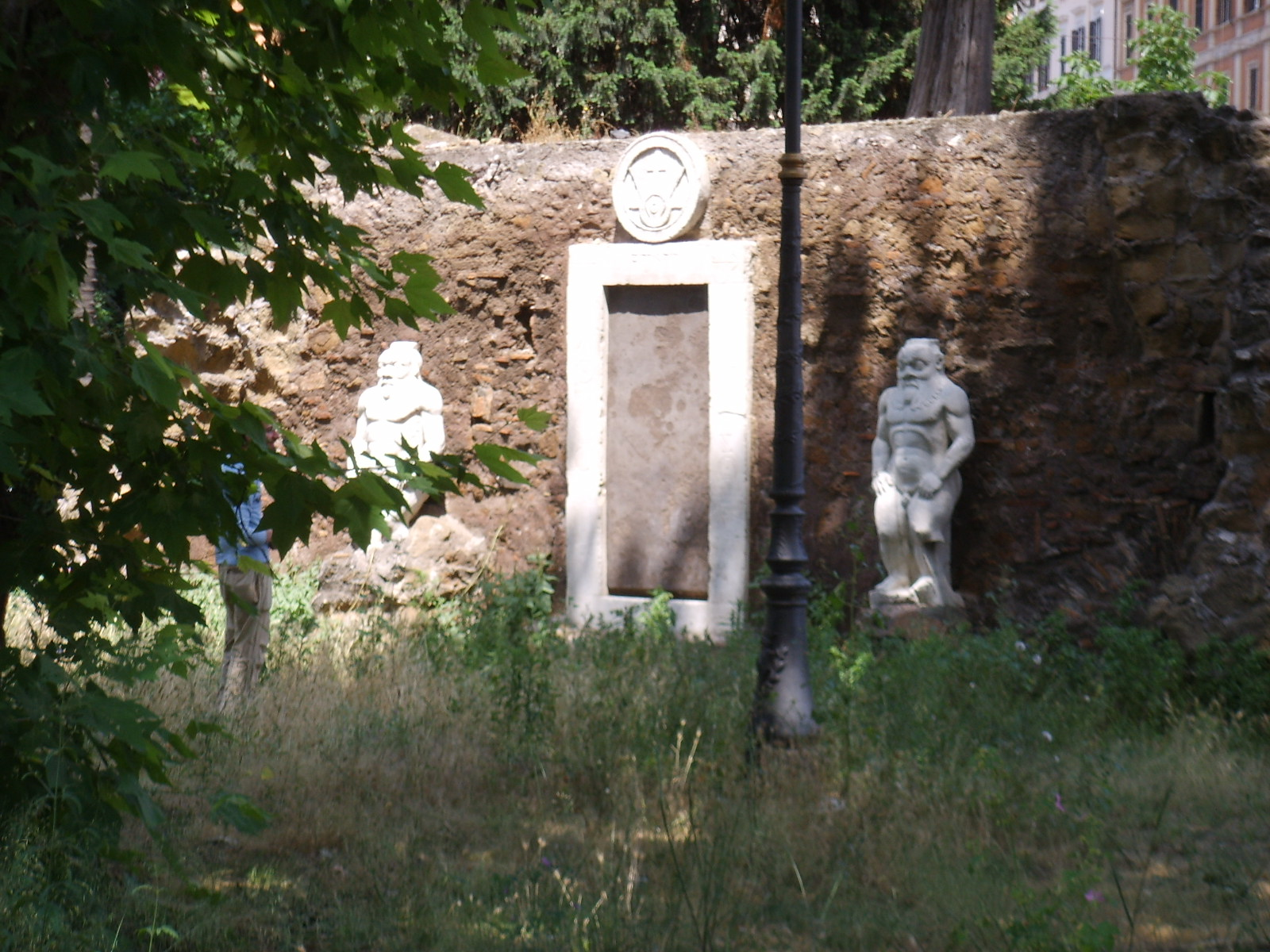
- The Alchemical Door

- Location within Rome

General information
- Location: Rome, Italy
- Coordinates: 41.89541222°N 12.50377122°E
- Construction started: 1678
- Completed: 1680

Design and construction
- Architect: Massimiliano Palombara

The Alchemical Door, also known as the Alchemy Gate or Magic Portal (Italian: Porta Alchemica or Porta Magica), is a monument built between 1678 and 1680 by Massimiliano Palombara, marquis of Pietraforte, in his residence, the villa Palombara, which was located on the Esquiline Hill, near Piazza Vittorio, in Rome. This is the only one of five former gates of the villa that remains; there was a lost door on the opposite side dating them to 1680 and four other lost inscriptions on the walls of the mansion inside the villa.

== Legends ==
According to a story collected by the erudite Francesco Cancellieri in 1802, a pilgrim named "Stibeum" (from Latin: stibium, which means "antimony") was hosted in the villa for a night. That night, the pilgrim, identified later by some as the alchemist Giuseppe Francesco Borri — known as Giustiniano Bono — searched the gardens of the villa overnight in search of a mysterious herb capable of concocting gold. Legend held that the next morning he was seen to disappear forever through a door, but left behind a few flakes of gold, the fruits of a successful alchemical transmutation, and a mysterious paper full of puzzling symbols and equations, putatively describing the ingredients and process required. The marquis had these symbols engraved on the five gates of the villa Palombara and on the walls of the mansion, hoping that one day they would be translated.

A second legend holds that between 1678 and 1680, the same Giuseppe Francesco Borri along with Athanasius Kircher and Gian Lorenzo Bernini designed and built the gate for the marquis. The marquis Palombara developed a passion for alchemy in 1656, when he visited the alchemical laboratory in Riario Palace, now known as Palazzo Corsini. Patronized by the abdicated and converted queen Christina of Sweden, the laboratory was supervised by Pietro Antonio Bandiera and had been visited by Borri and Kircher. This tradition holds the gate was built to memorialize a successful alchemical transmutation that occurred in the Riario Palace. It was rumored that Palombara, Bernini and Kircher were all poisoned on 28 November 1680, probably by Borri, for having revealed the secret formulas through the inscriptions on the gate.

Cancellieri published his semi-fanciful account in 1806, including his interpretation of the inscriptions on the Porta Alchimica. His work was published in June 1895 in French by Pietro Bornia as an issue of the periodical L'Initiation.

== The emblem ==
The particular drawing on the pediment of the gate, with two overlapping triangles and Latin inscriptions, recapitulates the title page in the posthumous 1677 edition—which differed from the title page of the first edition—of the alchemical book Aureum Saeculum Redivivum (1621) by Adrian von Mynsicht (known also as Madathanus). In 1747 the emblem was used by Wienner von Sonnenfels in his Splendor lucis, oder Glanz des Lichts. Similarly, the lower part of the emblem by von Mynsicht depicting a "centrum in trigono centri", was reproduced in a manuscript called the Geheime Figuren der Rosencreutzer (1785–88). The same drawing appear in a bookmark possessed by Bérenger Saunière, a parish priest at Rennes-le-Château in 1885.

It is suggested as well that the geometrical construction of the gate is similar to that of the 21st emblem of Michael Maier’s Atalanta Fugiens (1617).

== The signs ==
The seven signs are taken from Johannes de Monte-Snyder, Commentatio de Pharmaco Catholico published in the "Chymica Vannus" (Amsterdam) in 1666, and follow the sequence of planets, associated to the correspondents metals: Saturn-lead, Jupiter-tin, Mars-iron, Venus-bronze, Mercury, Antimony, and Vitriol.

== The inscriptions ==
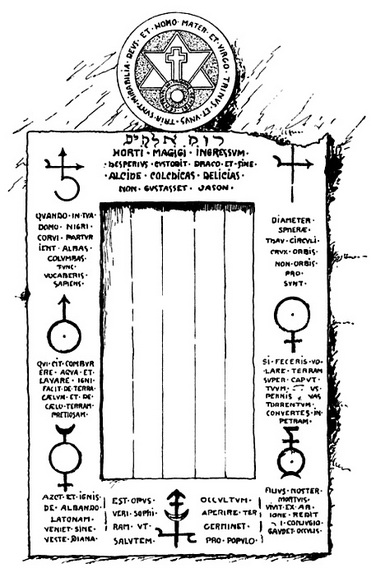
Porta Alchemica

The monument has numerous symbols and inscriptions used in alchemy. The inscriptions are hard to read from the monument itself.

Around the circle at top: "The center is in the triangle of the center." Also: "There are three marvels: God and man, mother and virgin, triune and one."

The Hebrew inscription, Ruach Elohim, means "Spirit of God." Beneath it: "The Hesperius dragon guards the entrance of the magic garden, and, without Alcides, Jason would not have tasted the delights of Colchis."

There are six sigils on the jambs, each with its phrase.

Saturn/Lead: "When in your house black crows give birth to white doves, then you will be called wise."

Jupiter/Tin: "The diameter of the sphere, the tau of the circle, the cross of the globe do not benefit the blind."

Mars/Iron: "He who can burn with water and wash with fire, makes heaven from earth and precious earth from heaven."

Venus/Bronze: "If you will make the earth fly upon your head, you will convert the waters of torrents to stone by its feathers."

Mercury: "Azoth and Fire: by whitening Latona, Diana will come without dress."

Antimony: "Our son lives dead, the king returns from the fire, and enjoys the occult conjunction."

On the base, Vitriol: "It is occult work of true wise to open the earth, so as he may germinate health/safety for people."

In another plate, now lost, was the device VILLAE IANUAM TRANANDO RECLUDENS IASON OBTINET LOCUPLES VELLUS MEDEAE 1680 (Passing by opening the door of the villa, Iason obtained the rich fleece of Medea 1680).

And on the doorstep, "SI SEDES NON IS," an anadrome, meaning both "If you sit, you do not go," and "If you do not sit, you go."

== The statues ==
The standing figures on both sides of the door feature deformed creatures, with short, stout legs, and a grotesque bearded face represent a real Egyptian divinity or semi-divinity, called Bes. A patron of the home, childbirth, and infants in ancient Egypt, Bes was also known in imperial Rome, where in pre-Christian age several people followed Egyptian cults.

Originally the two statues did not belong to Villa Palombara. They were found somewhere near the Quirinal Hill, where in ancient times stood a large temple dedicated to the Egyptian gods Isis and Serapis; century after century, many of its rich decorations, reliefs, small obelisks, etc. were unearthed, and were relocated in different parts of the city. During the works for the opening of piazza Vittorio, in 1888 also these statues were moved from their original location to the Porta Alchemica.

== Bibliography ==
On the door

- Giuliano Kremmerz, La porta ermetica, Edizioni Studio Tesi, 1982.
- Henry Carrington Bolton (gennaio-marzo 1895). The Porta Magica - Rome. The Journal of American Folk-Lore 8 (28): pp. 73–78.
- Pietro Bornia, La Porta Magica di Roma: studio storico, Luce ed Ombra (1915).
- Teodoro Brescia, Il Segno del Messia: l'enigma svelato - L'Olismo Originario, la Porta Alchemica e l'archeoastronomia, Battaglia Terme (Padova), Nexus, 2012. ISBN 88-89983-24-8
- Eugène Canseliet, Deux logis alchimiques en marge de la science et de l'histoire, Paris, Jean Schemit, 1945
- Luciano Pirrotta, La Porta Ermetica, Roma, Athanor, 1979.
- Nicoletta Cardano (a cura di), La Porta Magica. Luoghi e memorie nel giardino di piazza Vittorio, Roma, Palombi Editori, 1990.
- Maria Fiammetta Iovine, Gli Argonauti a Roma. Alchimia, ermetismo e storia inedita del Seicento nei Dialoghi eruditi di Giuseppe Giusto Guaccimanni, Roma, La Lepre Edizioni, 2014.
- Mino Gabriele, La porta magica di Roma simbolo dell'alchimia occidentale, Firenze, Leo S. Olschki, 2015.

On Massimiliano Palombara

- Marchese Massimiliano Palombara, La Bugia: Rime ermetiche e altri scritti. Da un Codice Reginense del sec. XVII, a cura di Anna Maria Partini, Roma, ed. Mediterranee, 1983.
- Mino Gabriele, Il giardino di Hermes: Massimiliano Palombara alchimista e rosacroce nella Roma del Seicento. Con la prima edizione del codice autografo della Bugia, 1656, Roma, editrice Ianua, 1986.
- Maria Fiammetta Iovine, Massimiliano Palombara filosofo incognito. Appunti per una biografia di un alchimista rosacrociano del XVII secolo, Roma, La Lepre Edizioni, 2016.

== See also ==
- Giuseppe Francesco Borri
- Aureum Saeculum Redivivum
