= Bugia =

Bugia may refer to:

- Béjaïa, a port city in Eastern Algeria near the mountains of Little Kabylia
- Béjaïa Province
- a candlestick, especially used as the name for an additional candle carried by a server standing beside a bishop at some Christian (particularly Roman Catholic) liturgical celebrations
- La Bugia ("the Candle"), a book of verses, by Massimiliano Palombara (1656)
