= Piazza Vittorio Emanuele II, Rome =

City square in Rome, Italy

Piazza Vittorio Emanuele II
- City square
- {{{other_names}}}
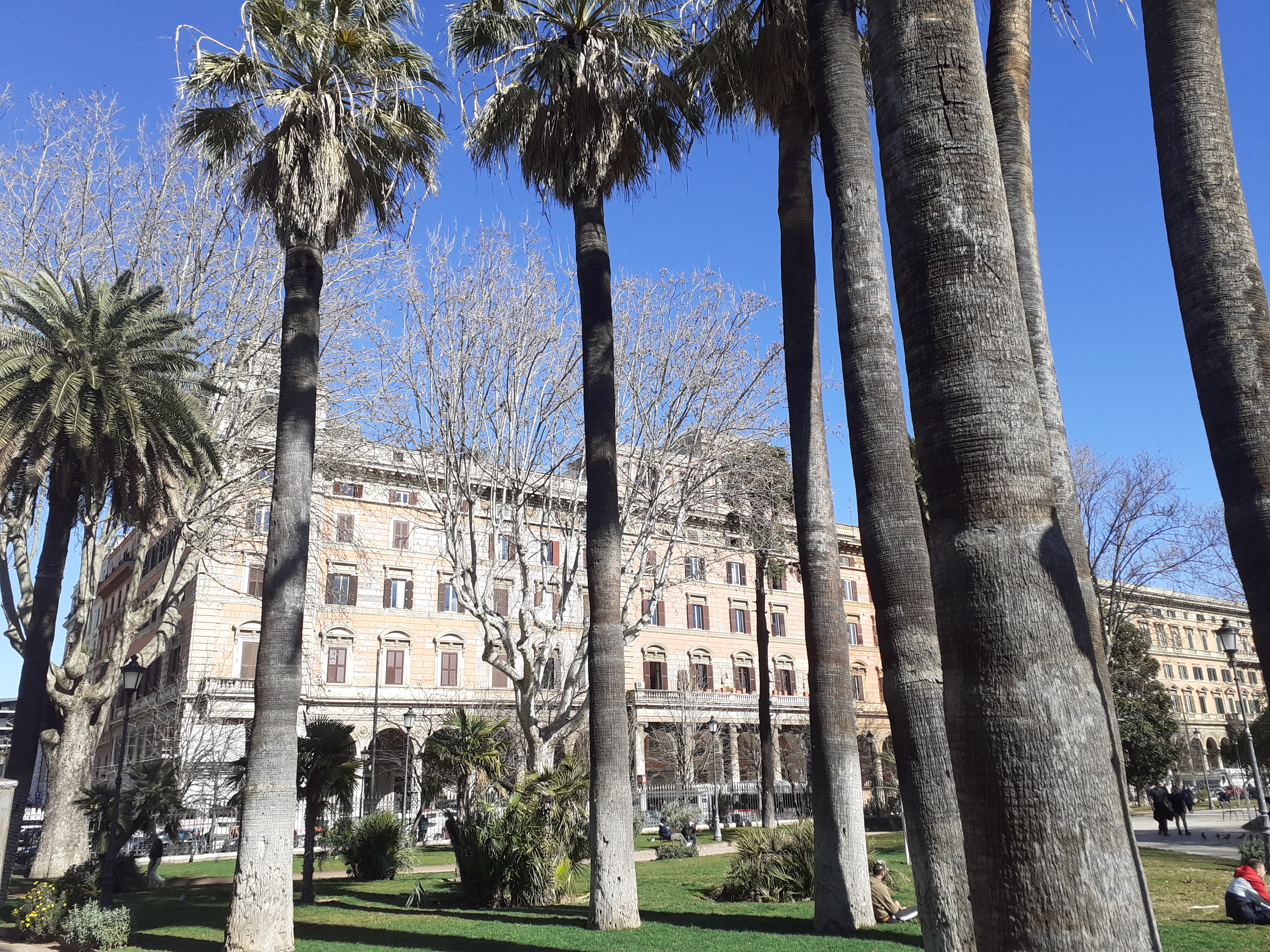
- The central gardens of the square and the porticoes
- Location: Rome, Italy
- Interactive map of Piazza Vittorio Emanuele II
- Coordinates: 41°53′42.58″N 12°30′17.14″E

Piazza Vittorio Emanuele II, also known as Piazza Vittorio, is a piazza in Rome, Italy, in the Esquilino rione. It is served by the Vittorio Emanuele Metro station.

== Description ==
Surrounded by palazzi with large porticoes in the 19th-century style, the piazza was built by Gaetano Koch shortly after the unification of Italy. Umbertine in style, it is the largest piazza in Rome (316 x 174 metres). In the centre of the piazza is a garden with the remains of a fountain built by Alexander Severus (so called Trophy of Marius), and the Porta Alchemica (Alchemist's Portal or also called Magic Gate or Porta Magica), the entrance to Villa Palombara, former residence of the alchemist Marquis Palombara.

== Cultural references ==
In Vittorio De Sica's film Bicycle Thieves, in Piazza Vittorio the protagonist Antonio Ricci and his young son Bruno seek desperately to recover his stolen bicycle, but realise the futility of their task as the vast square is filled with countless bicycles and bicycle parts that resemble his own.

The novel Clash of Civilizations Over an Elevator in Piazza Vittorio takes place in the area.

== Gallery ==
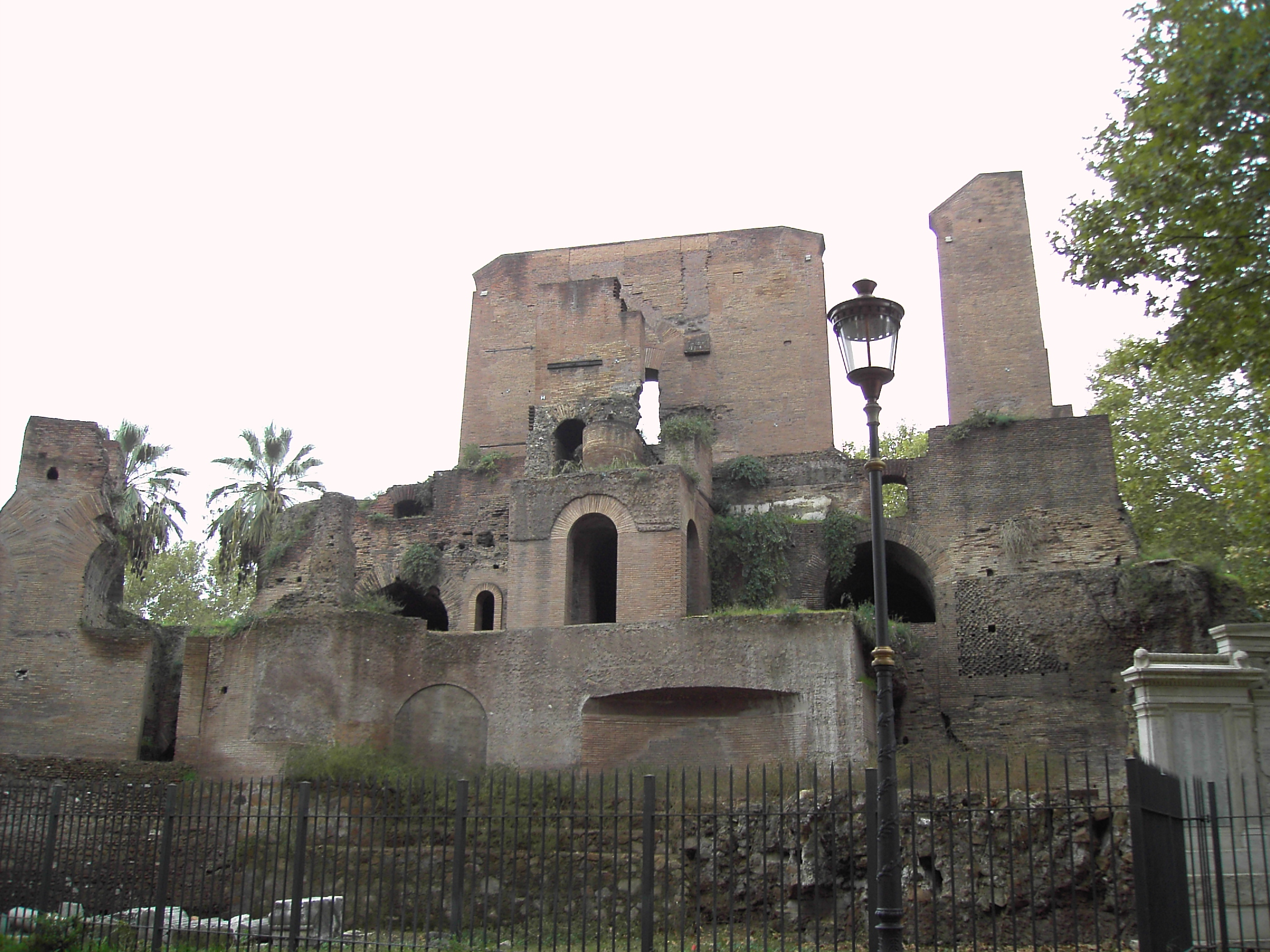
Remains of the fountain, called the Trofei di mario (Trophy of Marius)

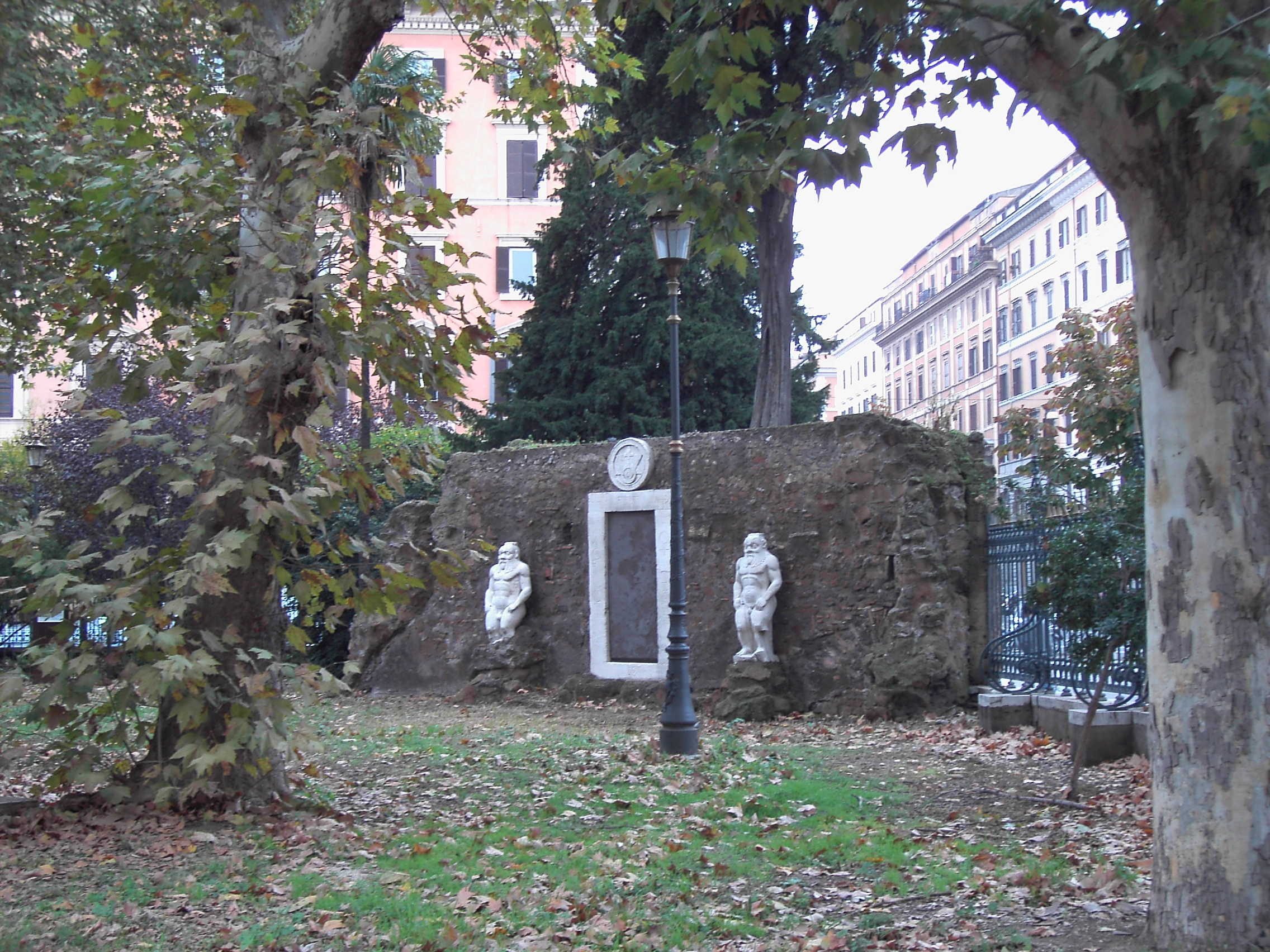
The Porta magica

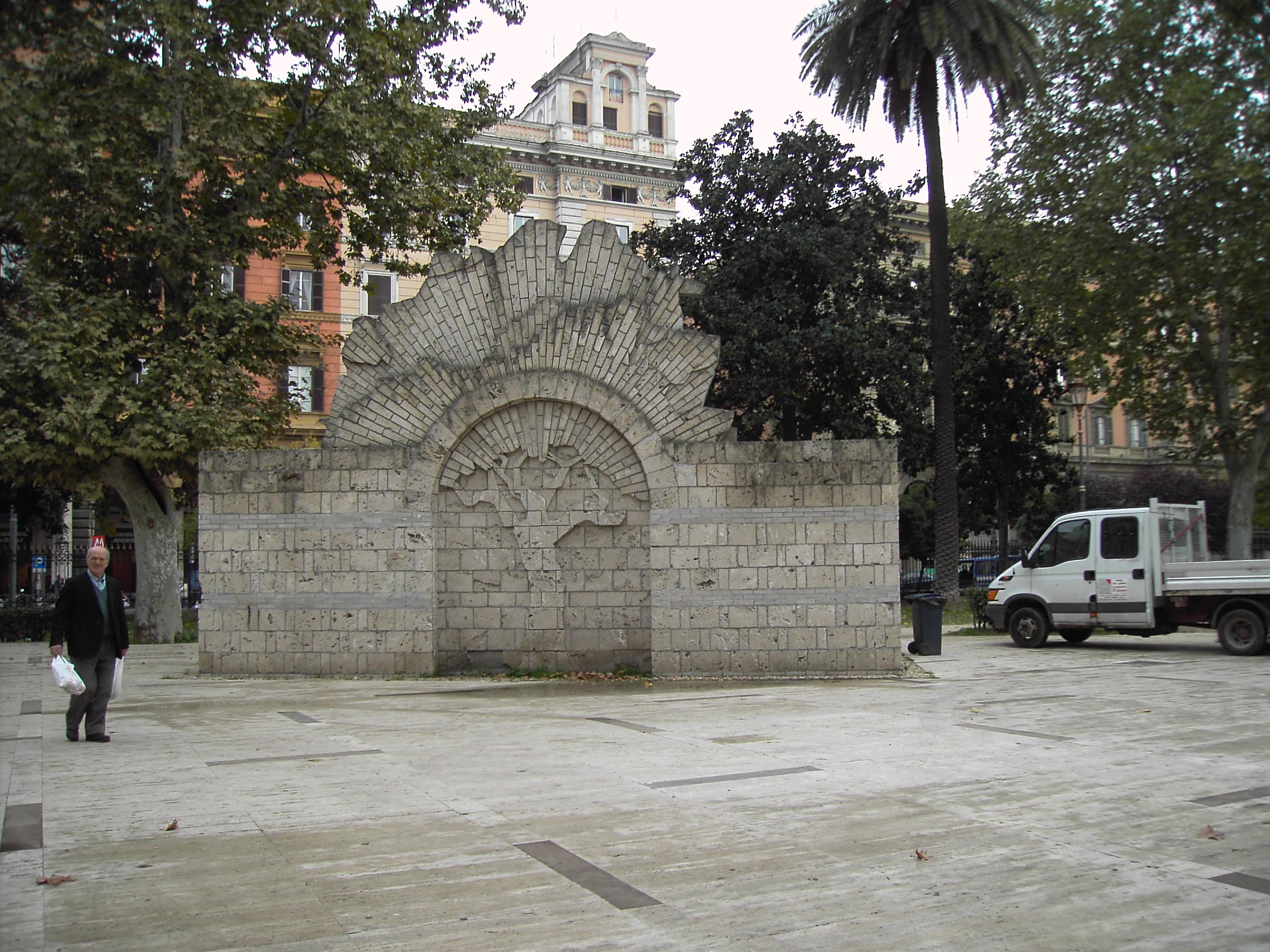
Modern gardens

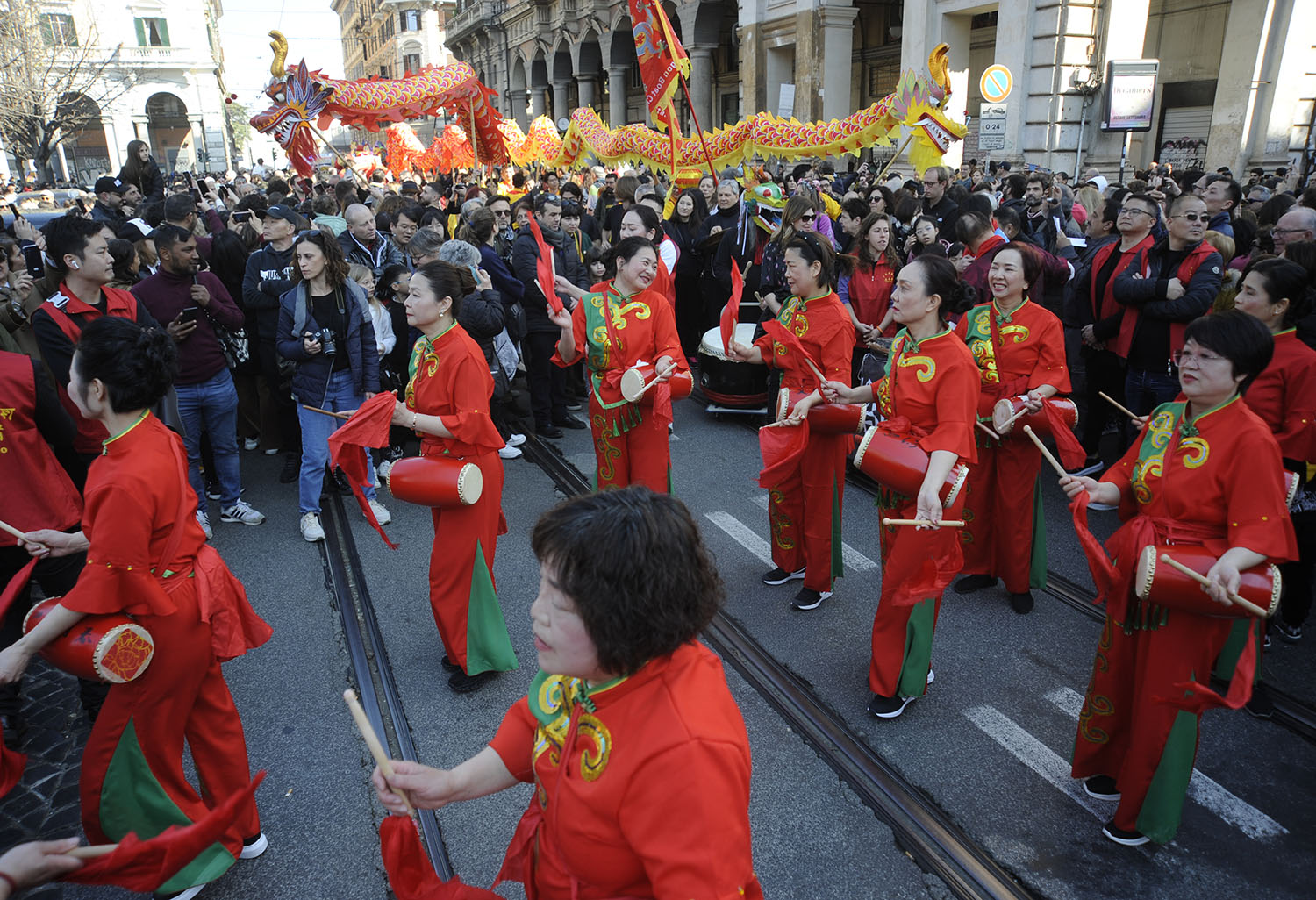
Chinese New Year Parade: the square is considered the epicenter of Rome's Chinatown

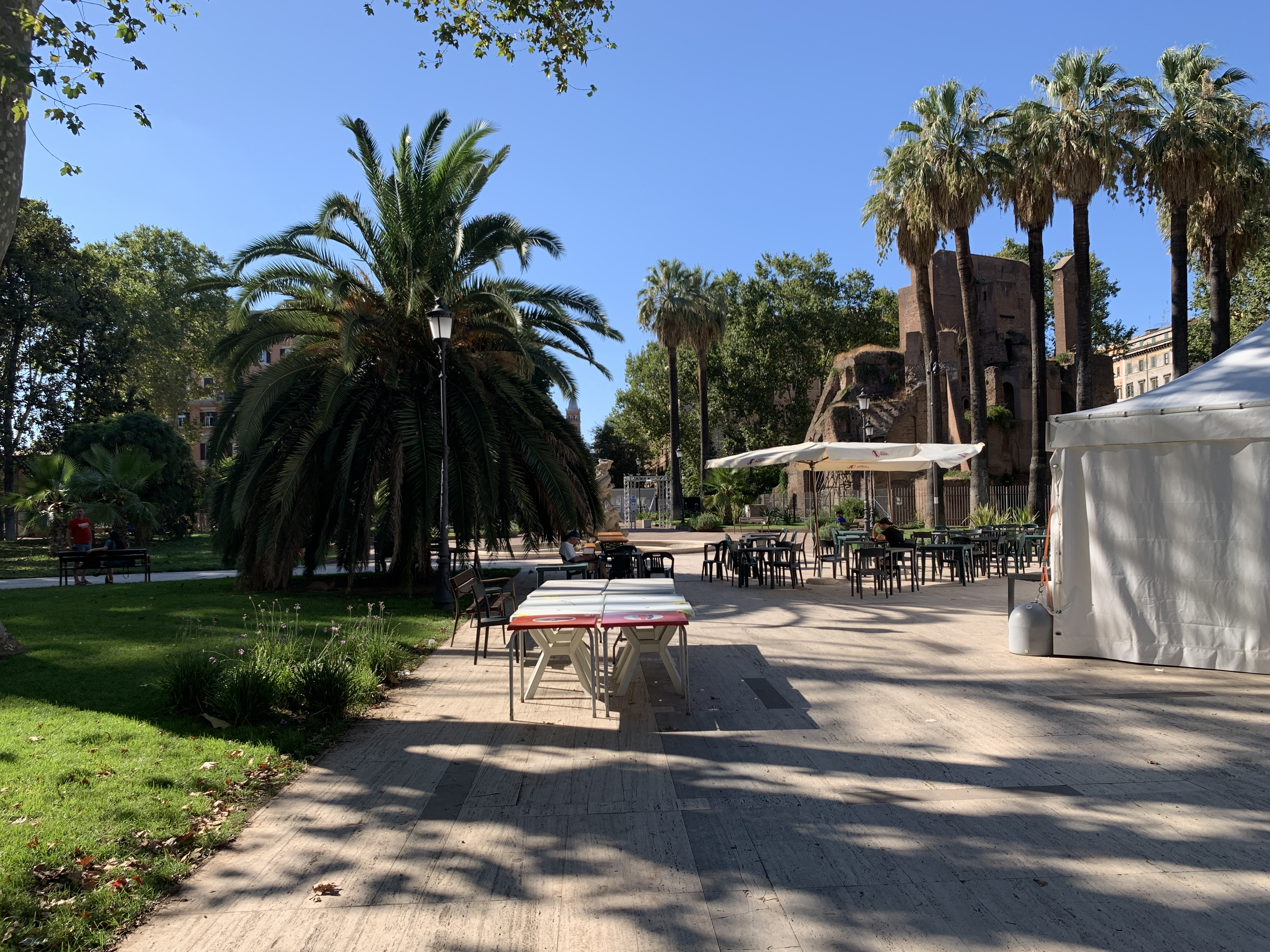
Nicola Calipari Gardens

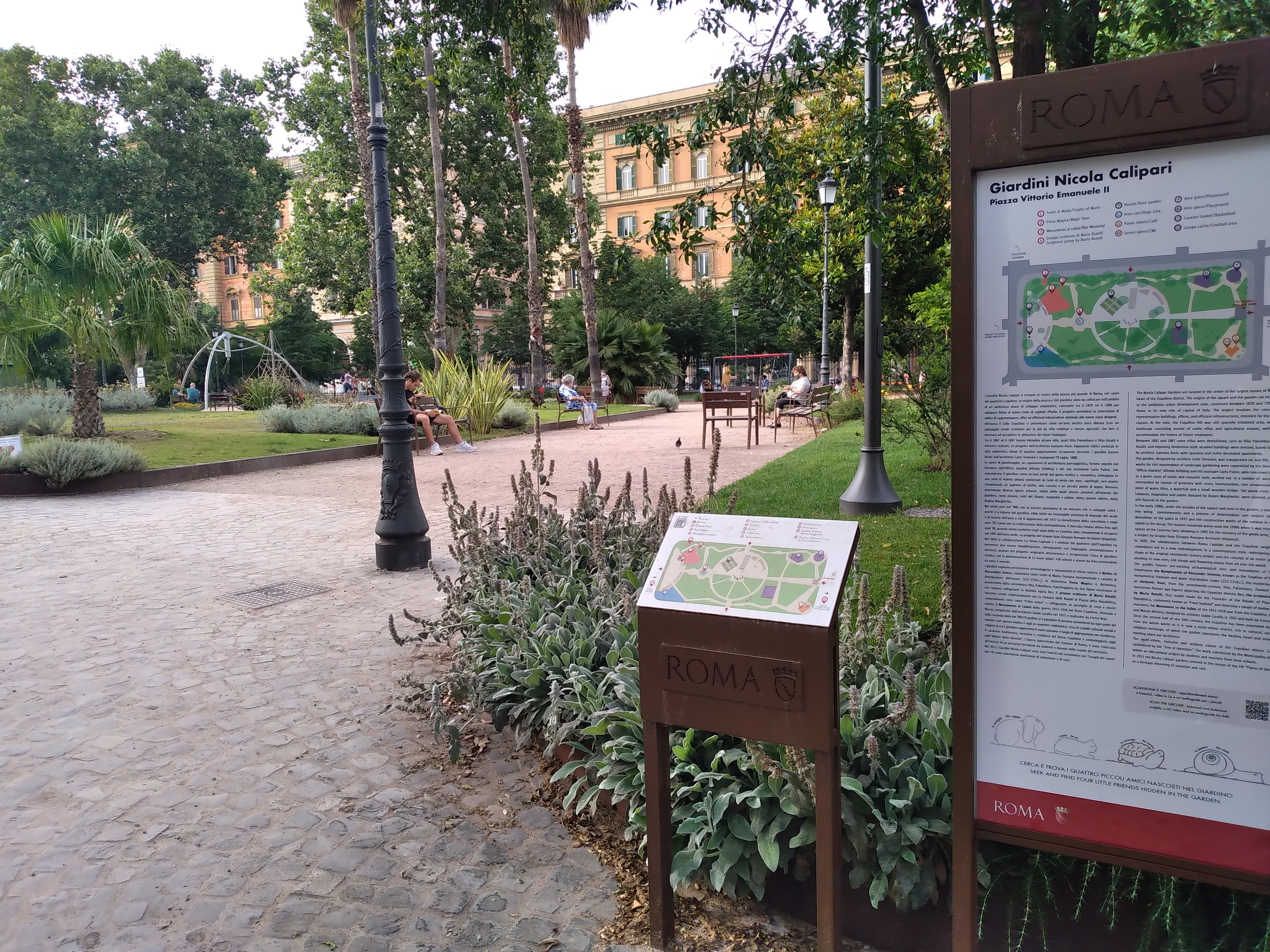
Nicola Calipari Gardens

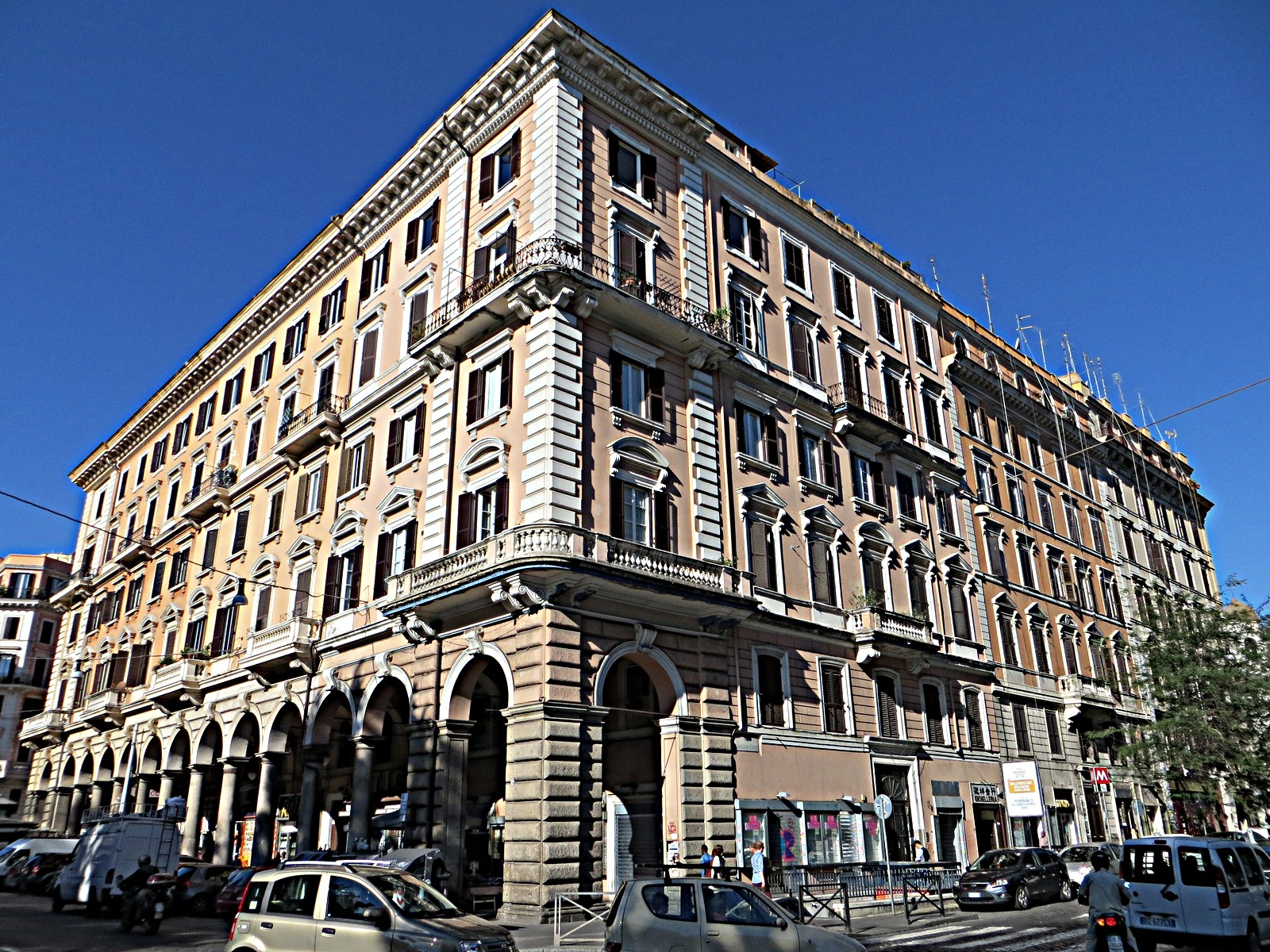
Via Carlo Alberto panoramio

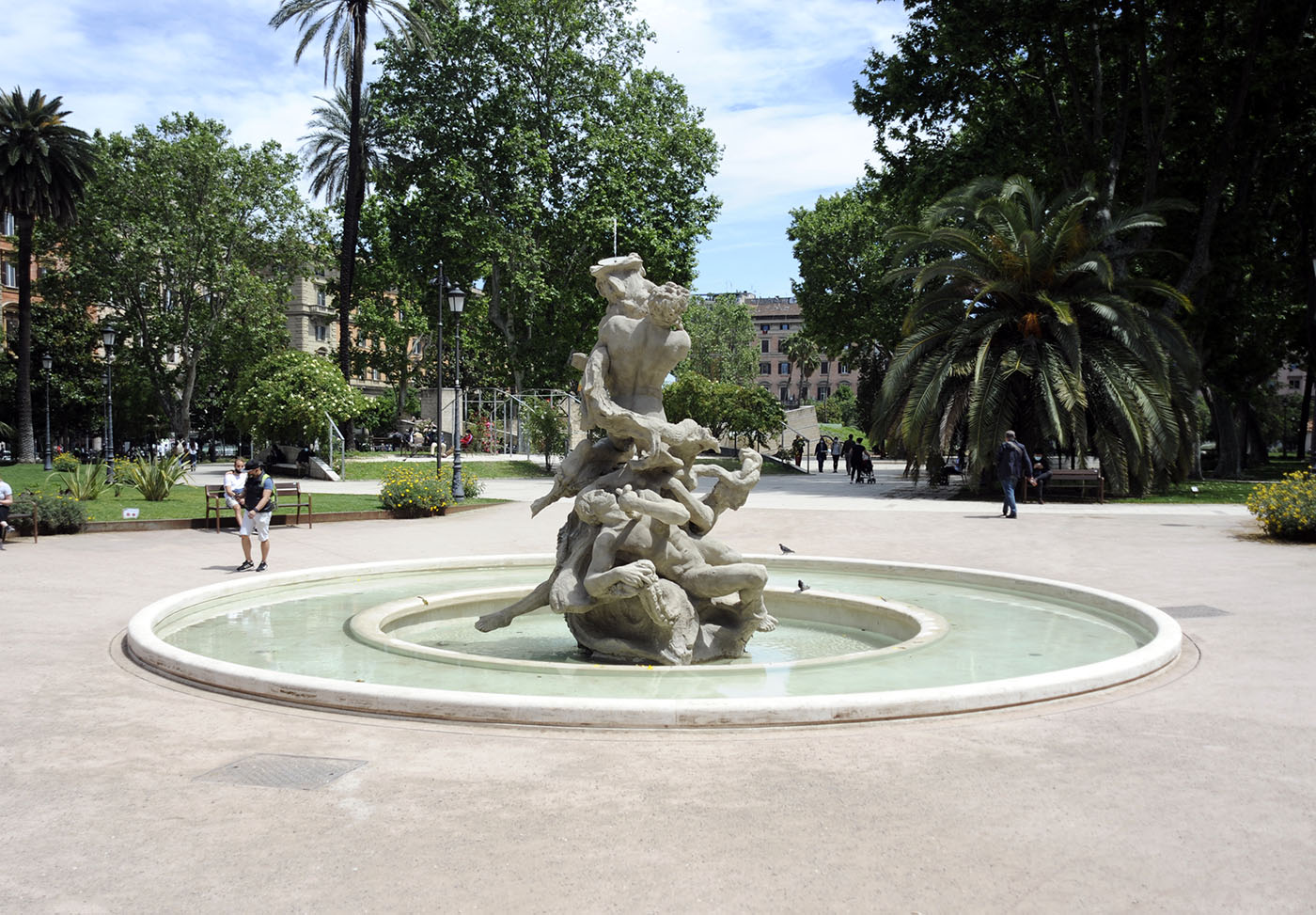
Fontana del Rutelli

== See also ==
List of city squares by size

- Piazza Venezia, in front of the Victor Emmanuel II Monument
