= Cesare Monti =

Italian cardinal

His Eminence Cesare Monti
- Cardinal, Archbishop of Milan
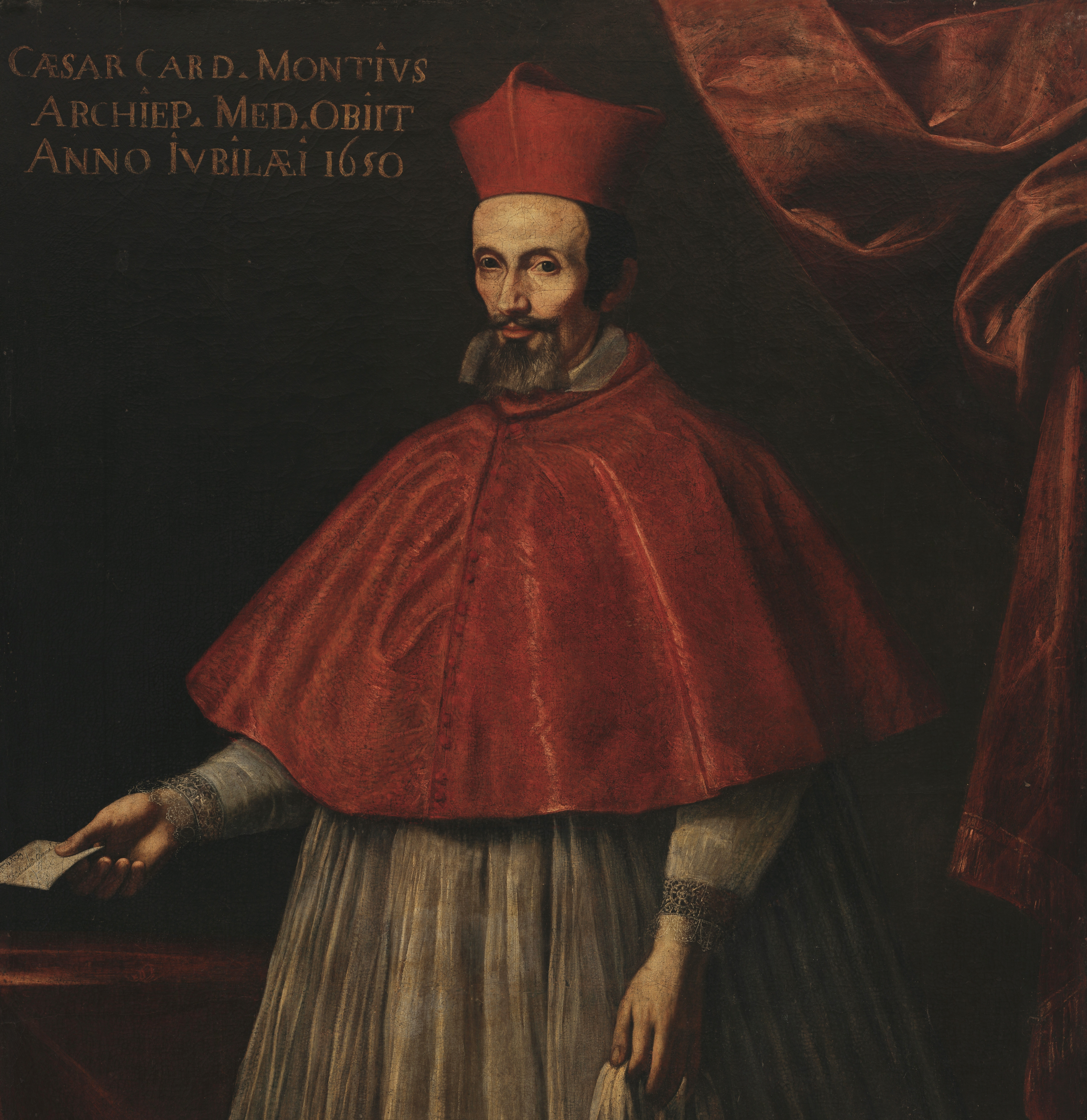
- Church: Catholic Church
- See: Milan
- Appointed: 20 December 1632
- Term ended: 16 August 1650
- Predecessor: Federico Borromeo
- Successor: Alfonso Litta
- Other post: Cardinal Priest of Santa Maria in Traspontina
- Previous post: Latin Patriarch of Antioch

Orders
- Consecration: 28 January 1630 (Bishop) by Giovanni Pamphili
- Created cardinal: 28 Nov 1633

Personal details
- Born: 5 May 1593 Milan
- Died: 16 August 1650 (aged 57) Milan
- Buried: Cathedral of Milan

Cesare Monti (5 May 1593 – 16 August 1650) was an Italian Cardinal who served as Latin Patriarch of Antioch and Archbishop of Milan.

== Early life ==
Cesare Monti was born on 5 May 1593 in Milan to the patrician family of Princivalle Monti and Anna Landriani. Because his father was a childhood friend of the Archbishop of Milan Cardinal Federico Borromeo, Cesare was allowed to enter into the prestigious Collegio Borromeo of Pavia. Cesare earned a doctorate Law at the University of Pavia in 1617 and he took up a career as lawyer in Milan. In 1618, under the tutelage of Cardinal Federico Borromeo, he moved to Rome where he became protonotary apostolic and in 1620 he was appointed referendary of the Tribunals of the Apostolic Signature, thus starting the ecclesiastic career in the administration of the Papal States. He also became prelate of the Sacred Consulta, a consultor to the Universal Inquisition under Francesco Barberini and later his assessor.

Cesare Monti in Rome met and was estimated by Maffeo Barberini, who, when he became pope with the name of Urban VIII, assigned to him sensitive tasks, up to the appointment as Apostolic Nuncio to the Kingdom of Naples on 27 April 1627. In June 1628 Cesare Monti was assigned to an even more delicate task: he was sent as extraordinary Nuncio to the Kingdom of Spain in order to help the ordinary Nuncio, Giovanni Pamphili, in dealing with king Philip V. Monti was not able to prevent the War of the Mantuan Succession, but he didn't lose the esteem of the pope: when on 19 November 1629 Giovanni Pamphili was proclaimed Cardinal, Monti was on the same day appointed Latin Patriarch of Antioch and Cardinal in pectore.

Cesare Monti, who at the time had received only the clerical tonsure, received the orders and was consecrated bishop on 28 January 1630 by Giovanni Pamphili in the chapel of the Royal Palace of Madrid at the presence of the king. Monti became the ordinary Nuncio in Madrid on 27 April 1630 after that Giovanni Pamphili returned to Rome. However the relations with Spanish court, and in particular with the Count-Duke of Olivares, became more and more strained, both because the pro-French politic of Urban VIII and the stout defence by Monti of the ecclesiastic prerogatives.

== Archbishop of Milan ==
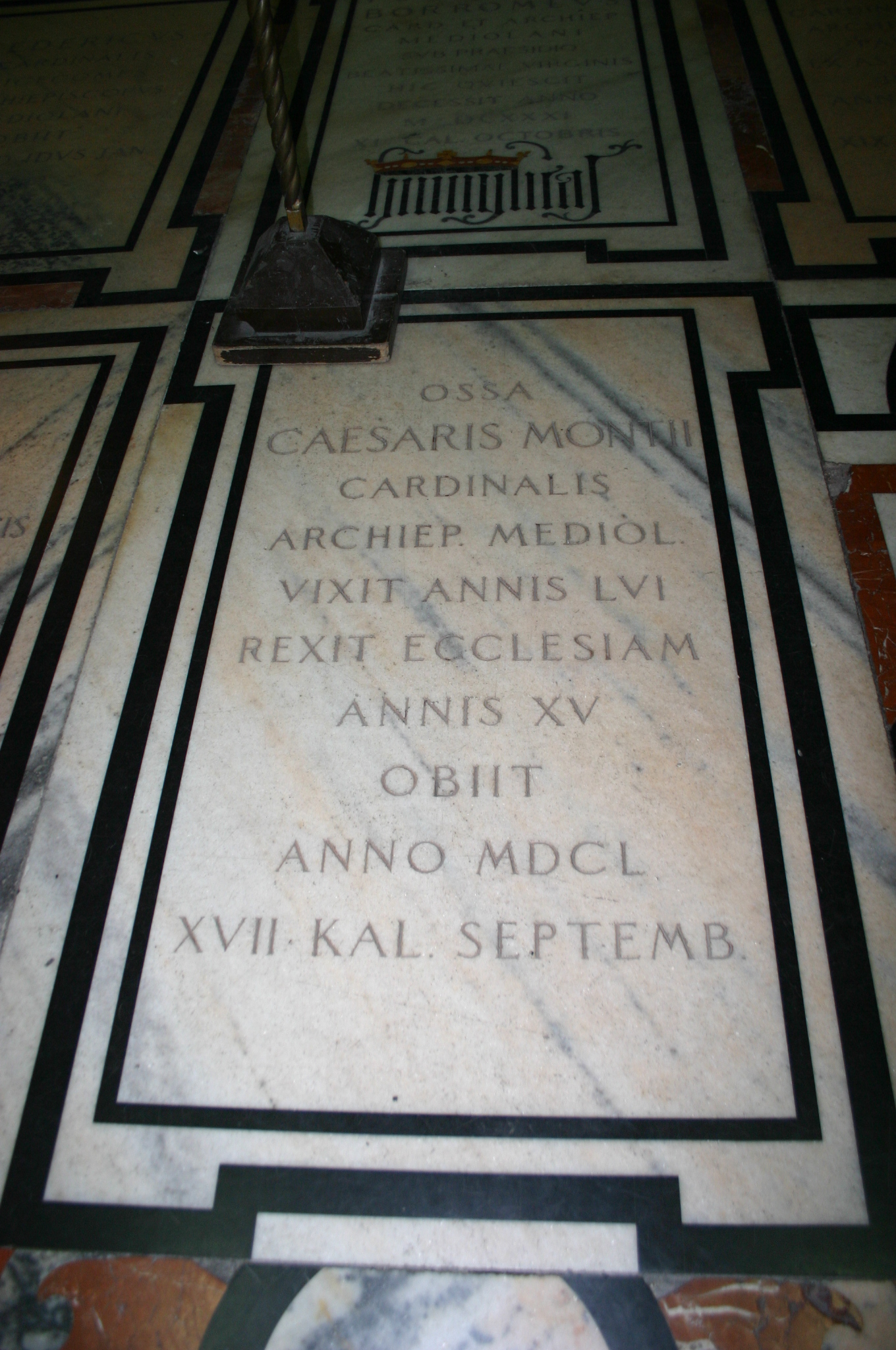
The tomb of Cardinal Cesare Monti in the Milan Cathedral.

The episcopal see of Milan became empty at the death of Cardinal Federico Borromeo in September 1631. Pope Urban VIII at first appointed as new Archbishop of Milan the Cardinal Girolamo Colonna di Sciarra, but the Spanish government, under which was the Duchy of Milan, refused the mandatory assent with the justification that Colonna was not a native of Milan. Thus on 20 December 1632 the pope appointed Cesare Monti, born in Milan, as Archbishop of Milan: the Spanish government at first opposed, but later gave its assent on 30 May 1633. On 28 November 1633 Cesare Monti was proclaimed Cardinal Priest and on the same date he resigned as Latin Patriarch of Antioch. Monti returned in Rome on 24 June 1634 and he took the title of Santa Maria in Traspontina on 6 August 1634.

Due to a clash between the Spanish government and the Vicar of the Milan's Chapter about the benefices arose during the vacancy of the Archbishop, Monti had to wait up to 29 April 1635 to formally enter in Milan.

When Monti entered in Milan, the town was still seriously enfeebled by the Great Plague of Milan which was ended in 1631 and killed almost the half of the population. He issued regulation concerning the discipline of the clergy and he convened all the vicars of the diocese on Milan in 1635. He celebrated three diocesan synods in 1637, 1640, 1650, and he published a new edition of the Ambrosian Missal in 1640. In 1644 he participated to the Papal conclave which elected Giovanni Pamphili, with the name of Pope Innocent X.

With his broadminded approach, Monti supported the unconventional lay confraternity founded by Giacomo Filippo di Santa Pelagia in Milan, which promoted the conversions of prostitutes and which was condemned by the Church after Monti's death. Monti was also a great patron of culture and arts, as well as a collector of paintings, and a part of his gallery, originally of 221 pieces, is now at the Diocesan Museum of Milan.

Monti died on 16 August 1650 in Milan. He was exposed in the metropolitan Cathedral of Milan and buried in the North transept, though he had expressed a desire to be buried at the Sanctuary of the Divine Maternity of Mary in Trezzo sull'Adda. However, cathedral administrators and the Milanese people did not follow his desire, "wanting to have in their cathedral the beloved archbishop".
