= Vittorio Emanuele (Rome Metro) =

Rome metro station

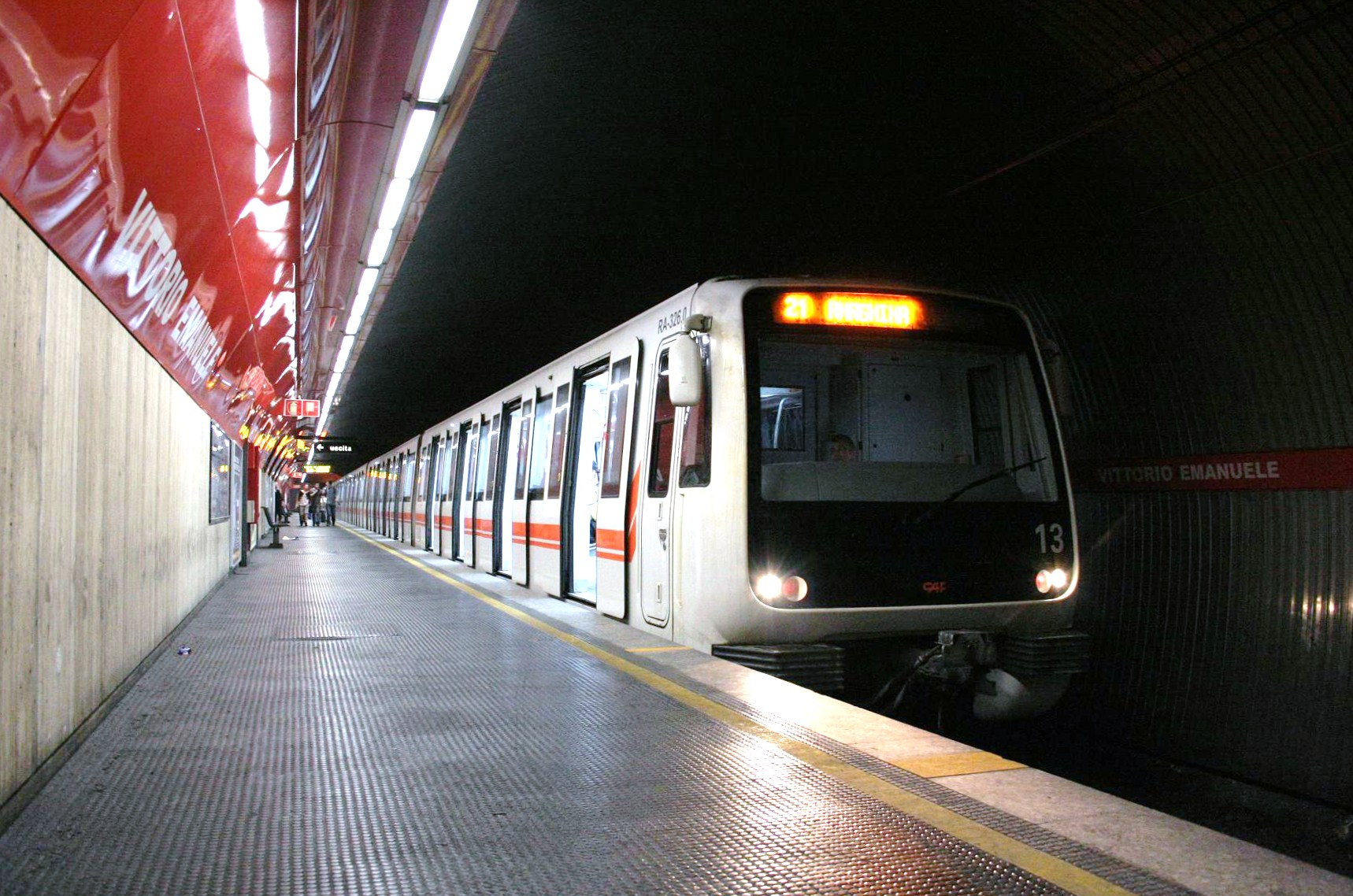

General information
- Coordinates: 41°53′40″N 12°30′15″E
- Owner: ATAC
- Tracks: 2

Construction
- Structure type: Underground

History
- Opened: 1980; 46 years ago

Services
Preceding station	Rome Metro	Following station
Termini towards Battistini	Line A	Manzoni towards Anagnina
Location
- Click on the map to see marker

Vittorio Emanuele is a station on Line A of the Rome Metro. The station was inaugurated in 1980 and is sited underground, beneath Piazza Vittorio Emanuele II, which gives it its name, in the Esquilino rione.

The atrium of the station houses several mosaics from the Artemetro Roma Prize. The mosaics on display are by Nicola Carrino and Giulia Napoleone.

On 17 October 2006 there was a train crash in this station, killing one woman and injuring over 200 people.

== Located nearby ==
There are many notable sites nearby the station, including:

- Piazza Vittorio Emanuele II
- Auditorium of Maecenas
- Basilica di Santa Maria Maggiore
- Teatro Ambra Jovinelli
- Temple of Minerva Medica (nymphaeum)
- Santa Croce in Gerusalemme
- Porta Maggiore and the underground basilica of Porta Maggiore
- Tomb of Eurysaces the Baker
- Basilica di Santa Prassede
- Museo Nazionale d'Arte Orientale
- Capolinea Roma-Pantano
- Via Gioberti
- Via Merulana
- Mercato Vittorio.

In addition, the station is in 5 minutes' walking distance from many cafes, restaurants, and shops.

Finally, there are many bus connections; Vittorio Emanuele Metro station has connections with buses 23, 40, and 64.
