= Esquilino (rione of Rome) =

Coordinates: 41°53′35″N 12°30′14″E

- Rione of Rome
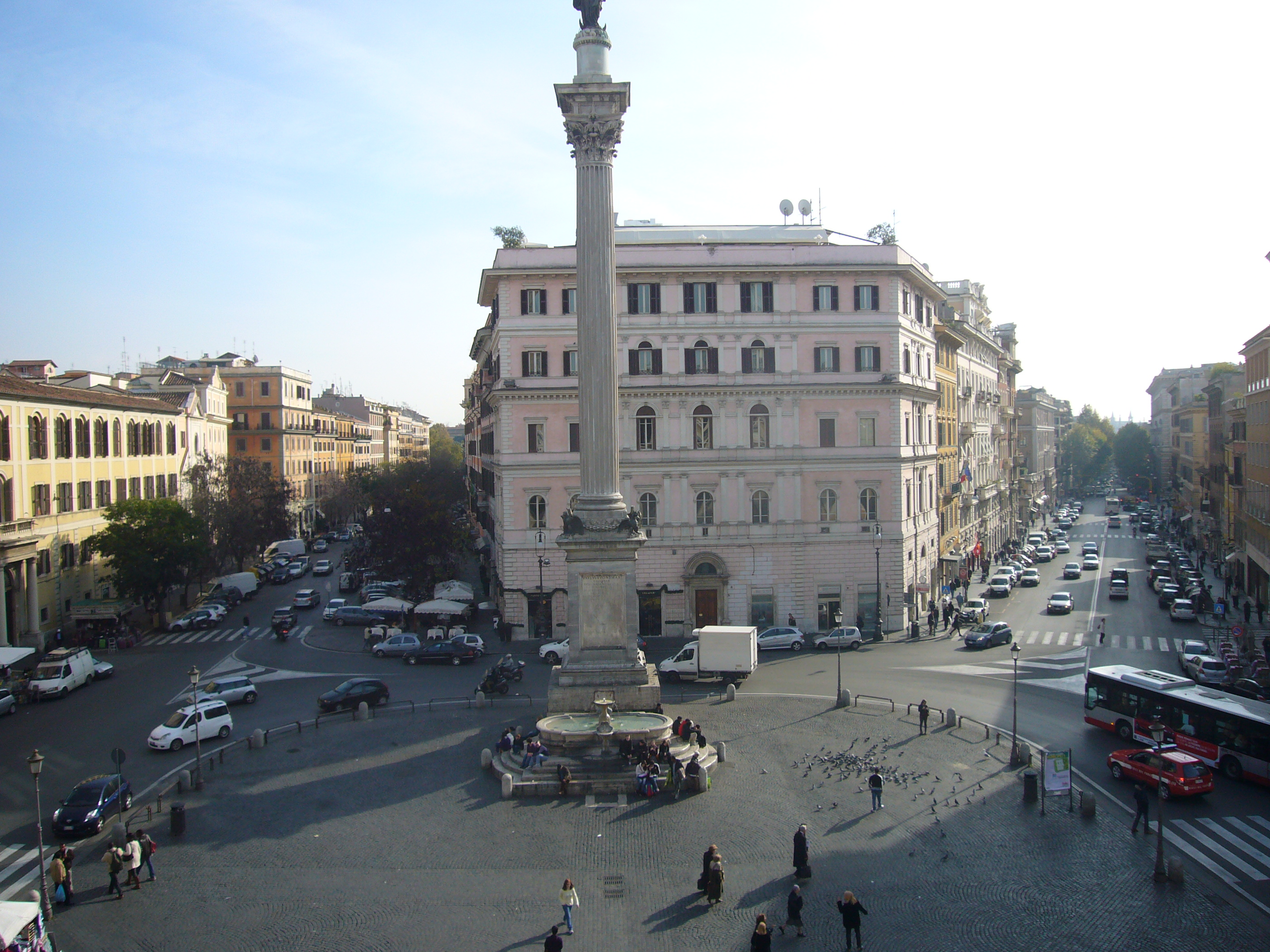
- Via Merulana and Via Carlo Alberto seen from Santa Maria Maggiore

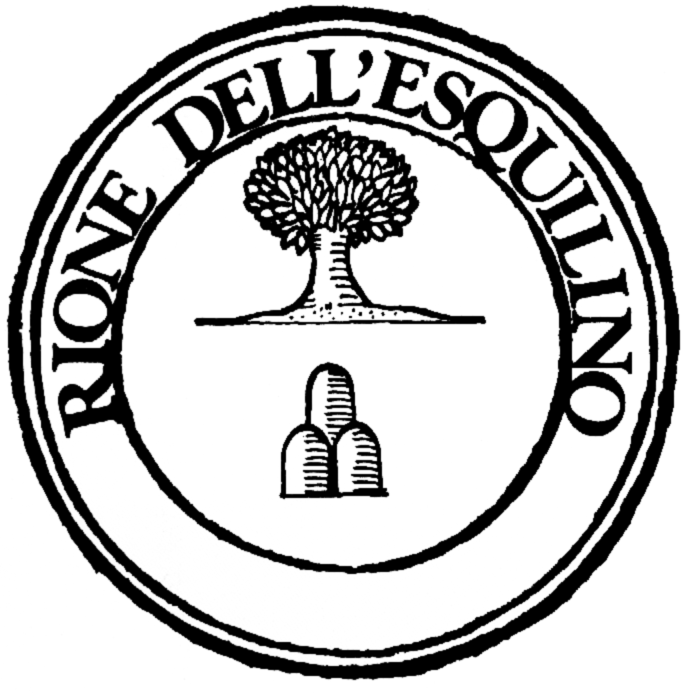
- Seal

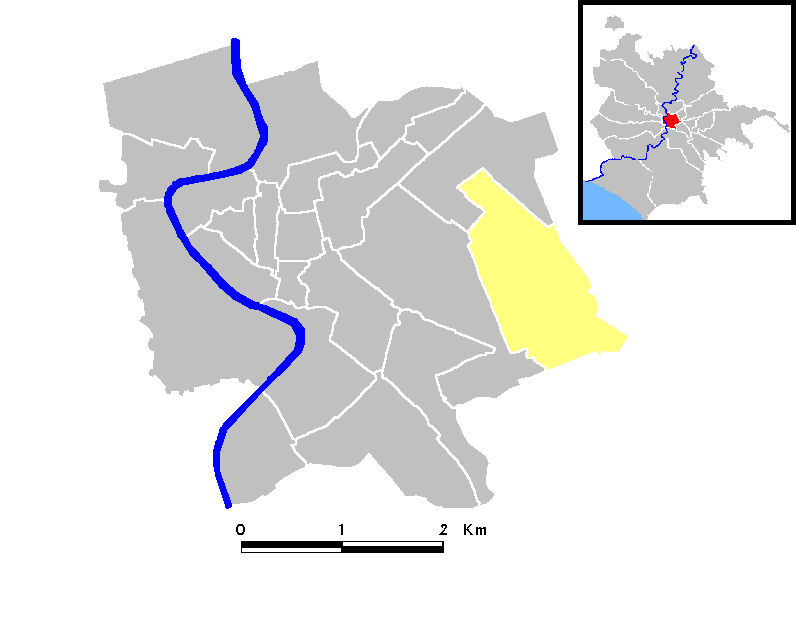
- Position of the rione within the center of the city
- Country: Italy
- Region: Lazio
- Province: Rome
- Comune: Rome
- Time zone: UTC+1 (CET)
  - Summer (DST): UTC+2 (CEST)

Esquilino (Italian: [eskwiˈliːno]) is the 15th rione, or administrative division, of Rome, Italy, identified by the initials R. XV, and is Located within the Municipio I. It is named after the Esquiline Hill, one of the Seven Hills of Rome.

Its coat of arms bears two figures: a tree and three green mountains, all on a silver background.

It is a cosmopolitan neighbourhood, with immigrants from Asia and North Africa.

== History ==
Esquilino is part of the historic center of Rome, where urbanization developed in ancient times. Along with Palatina, Collina and Suburana, the area was one of the four regiones established by Servius Tullius: until Emperor Augustus adopted a new administrative subdivision of the city, the region included the whole area that is part of the modern rione Monti.

The territory of the modern rione Esquilino, however, has always been regarded as the frontier of the inner city. Initially at the edge of the Servian Wall, whose agger was located in the area, during the Imperial age the borough was inserted inside the Aurelian Walls, though remaining marginal in the city context: indeed, according to a probable etymology, the name comes from the Latin word esquiliae, meaning "suburb".

Up until Augustan age, the area beyond the agger of the republican walls was a huge landfill, while another portion housed a cemetery for slaves and indigent people. Following the urban reform pursued by Emperor Augustus, the polluted and pestilent areas were interred and the embankment of the ancient walls became a footway. Also created in the area was a park, the Gardens of Maecenas, a complex of magnificent gardens which housed a tall tower where, according to Suetonius, Emperor Nero watched Rome burning. Until the late Imperial age, the borough became a favorite location of residential villas, called Horti.

During the Middle Ages, the area came into possession of several orders and convents seated near Santa Maria Maggiore. Starting from the 17th century, a number of aristocratic villas were built in the territory of the rione, such as Villa Palombara, that used to house the famous Porta Alchemica which currently stands out in the garden of Piazza Vittorio Emanuele II.

A relevant part of the ancient remains has been dismantled after the residential development of the area, starting from 1870, with the construction of new buildings destined to the clerical middle class.

== Geography ==
The rione is located in the eastern part of the center of Rome. It was established in 1921, detaching a portion of Monti.

=== Boundaries ===
Northward, Esquilino borders with Castro Pretorio (R. XVIII), the boundary being outlined by Via Gioberti, Via Giovanni Giolitti, Piazza dei Cinquecento, Viale Enrico De Nicola, Via Marsala and Piazzale Sisto V.

To the east, it borders with quartieri Tiburtino (Q. XII) (from which is separated by the portion of the Aurelian Walls beside Via di Porta Tiburtina, located between Piazzale Sisto V and Viale dello Scalo San Lorenzo) and Prenestino-Labicano (Q. VII), from which is separated by Piazzale Labicano (Porta Maggiore).

Southward, the rione borders with Quartiere Tuscolano (Q. VIII), whose boundary is marked by the portion of the Aurelian Walls between Piazzale Labicano and Piazzale Appio (Porta San Giovanni).

To the west, Esquilino borders with Monti (R. I): the boundary is marked by Piazza di Porta San Giovanni, Piazza di San Giovanni in Laterano, Via Merulana and Piazza di Santa Maria Maggiore.

== Places of interest ==
=== Archaeological sites ===
- Tomb of Eurysaces the Baker
- Porta Maggiore
- Porta Maggiore Basilica
- Ipogeo degli Aureli
- Amphitheatrum Castrense
- Temple of Minerva Medica
- Arch of Pope Sixtus V

=== Palaces and buildings ===
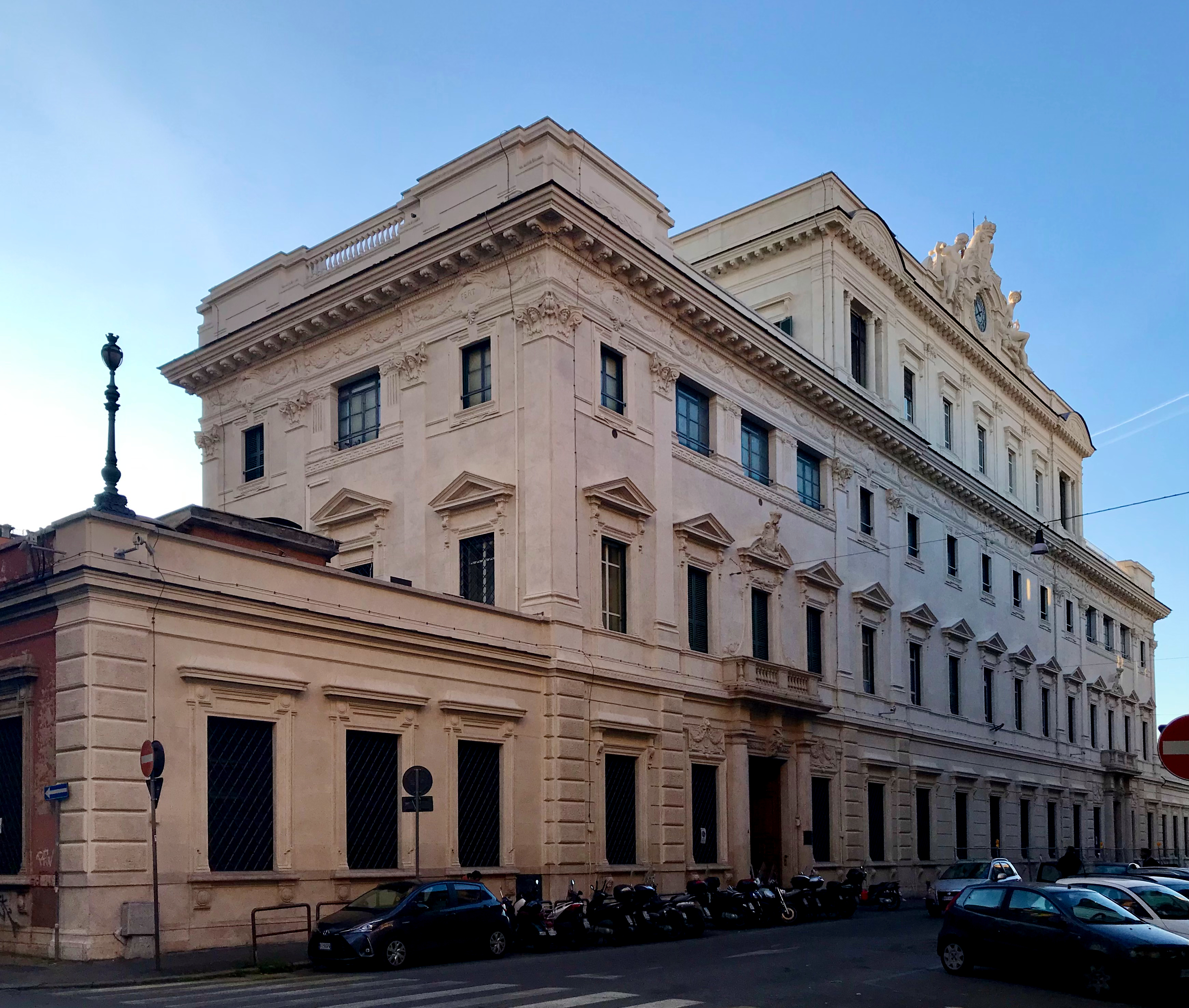
Palazzo della Zecca di Stato

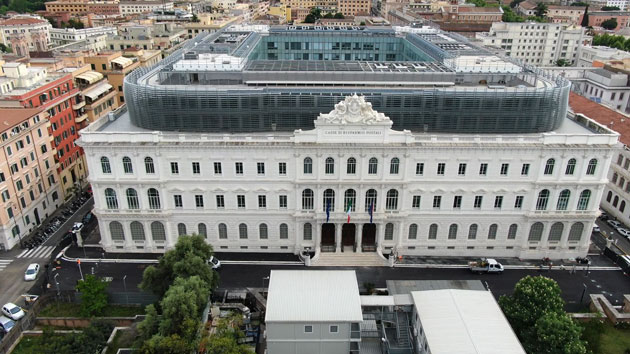
The headquarters of the Italian intelligence agencies

- Roma Termini railway station, in Piazza dei Cinquecento.
- Palazzo del Freddo Giovanni Fassi, in Via Principe Eugenio, an ice-cream parlour established in 1928 in a liberty building
- Acquario Romano, in Piazza Manfredo Fanti
- Palazzo della Zecca di Stato, in Via Principe Umberto, seat of the first national mint
- Villa Wolkonsky, in Via Ludovico di Savoia

=== Churches ===
- Santa Croce in Gerusalemme
- Sant'Antonio da Padova in Via Merulana
- Sant'Eusebio
- Santi Vito e Modesto
- Santa Bibiana
- Sant'Antonio Abate all'Esquilino
- Sant'Alfonso all'Esquilino
- Santa Maria del Buon Aiuto nell'Anfiteatro Castrense
- Santa Margherita Maria Alacoque
- Santa Maria Immacolata all'Esquilino
- Chapel of Sant'Elena
- Chapel of Santa Maria Addolorata all'Esquilino
- Santissimo Crocifisso alla Stazione Termini

=== Other ===
- Teatro Ambra Jovinelli
- Piazza Vittorio Emanuele II: commonly abbreviated to Piazza Vittorio, it is a square completely covered in porticoes in the Piedmontese style. In the centre there is a large garden and saved the remains of the so-called "Nymphaeum of Alexander (Trophies of Mario)": the name derives from two marble trophies later moved by Sixtus V to the Cordonata at the Campidoglio. A large Chinese community settled in the area since the 1960s and today the area is deeply multi-ethnic.
