= Hypogeum of the Aurelii =

The Hypogeum of the Aurelii or the Hypogeum of Aurelius Felicissimus is a privately run catacomb in Rome. It is sited at the junction of the modern viale Manzoni and via Luzzatti, behind the ancient via Labicana, in the Esquilino district. It is on two levels, the upper one originally being a semi-underground hall (only the bottom part of which survives) and the lower one consisting of two completely underground spaces.

It is named after one of its two underground areas, known as the Cubiculum of the Aurelii, in which was discovered a mosaic stating that an "Aurelius Felicissimus" dedicated the tomb to his siblings Aurelius Onesimus, Aurelius Papirius and Aurelia Prima. To one side of it is a marble inscription to a dead Aurelia Myrsina by her parents Aurelius Martinus and Iulia Lydia.

It was discovered during the construction of a garage in 1919 and admired by scholars for its rich c. 230 AD frescoes, whose interpretation is still uncertain. It was abandoned after the construction of the Aurelian Wall and the expansion of the pomerium and is not mentioned in any ancient, medieval or Renaissance literary sources.
