= Adrian von Mynsicht =

German alchemist

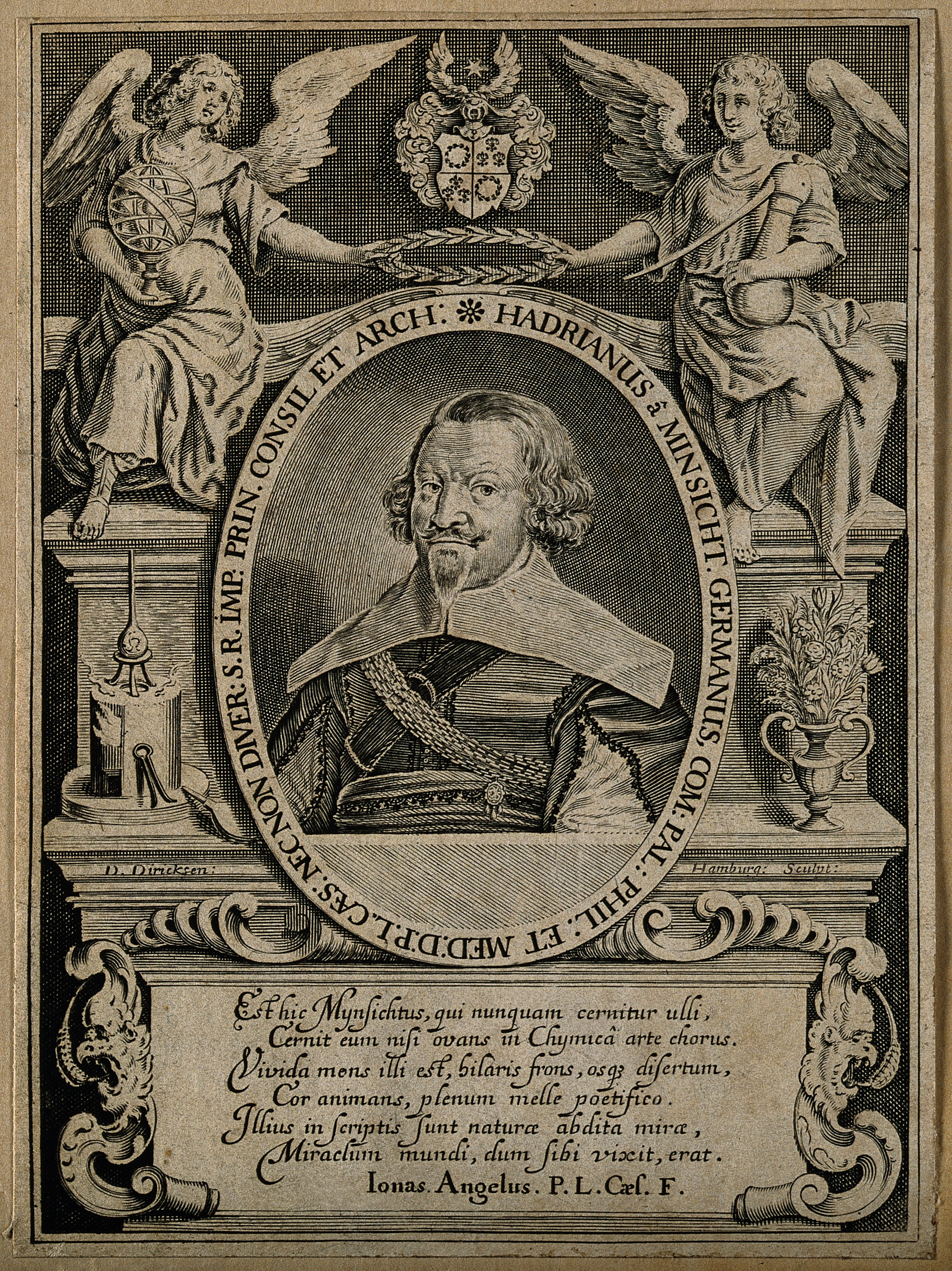
Credit:Wellcome Library

Adrian von Mynsicht (1603–1638) was a German alchemist. He is best known for the allegorical work Aureum Saeculum Redivivum (The Golden Age Restored), published under the pseudonym Henricus Madathanus, and usually dated to 1621/2. It was soon reprinted in collections, the Musaeum Hermeticum and the Dyas Chymica Tripartita, both 1625 (Frankfurt, same publisher).

He also wrote the Thesaurus et Armamentarium Medico-Chymicum (1631), a medical work which details remedies against certain diseases, concluding with a testaments on the philosopher's stone.

== Works ==
- Hadriani a Mynsicht Thesaurus et armamentarium medico-chymicum. - Lubecae : Schernwebel / Schmalherz, 1638. digital edition
- Hadriani a Mynsicht Thesaurus et armamentarium medico-chymicum : in quo selectissimorum contra quosuis morbos pharmacorum conficiendorum secretissima ratio aperitur, una cum eorundem virtute, usu, & dosi. - Lugduni : Huguetan, 1645 digital edition
- Hadriani a Mynsicht alias Tribudenii Thesaurus et armamentarium medico-chymicum. - Lubecae : Schernwebel, 1646. digital edition
- Hadriani a Mynsicht Thesaurus et armamentarium medico-chymicum. - Rothomagi : Berthelin, 1651. digital edition
- Hadriani a Mynsicht Thesaurus et armamentarium medico-chymicum. - Lubecae : A. J. Becker / Schmalherz, 1662. digital edition
- Hadriani a Mynsicht Thesaurus et armamentarium medico-chymicum : hoc est selectissimorum, contra quosvis morbos, pharmacorum conficiendorum secretissima ratio, propria laborum experientia, multiplici & felicissima praxi confirmata, & nunc una cum remediorum virtute, usu, & dosi, doctrinae, & sapietiae filiis fideliter revelata & communicata. - Francofurti : Wust, 1675. digital edition
- Adriani a Mynsicht Medicinisch-chymische Schatz- und Rüst-Kammer. - Stuttgart : Zubrodt / Lorber, 1686. digital edition
- Adriani a Mynsicht Medicinisch-chymische Schatz- und Rüst-Kammer [Adrian of Mynsicht's medical-chemical Treasury and Armoury]. - Offenbach a.M. : Brunn & Metzler, 1695. digital edition

== Gallery ==
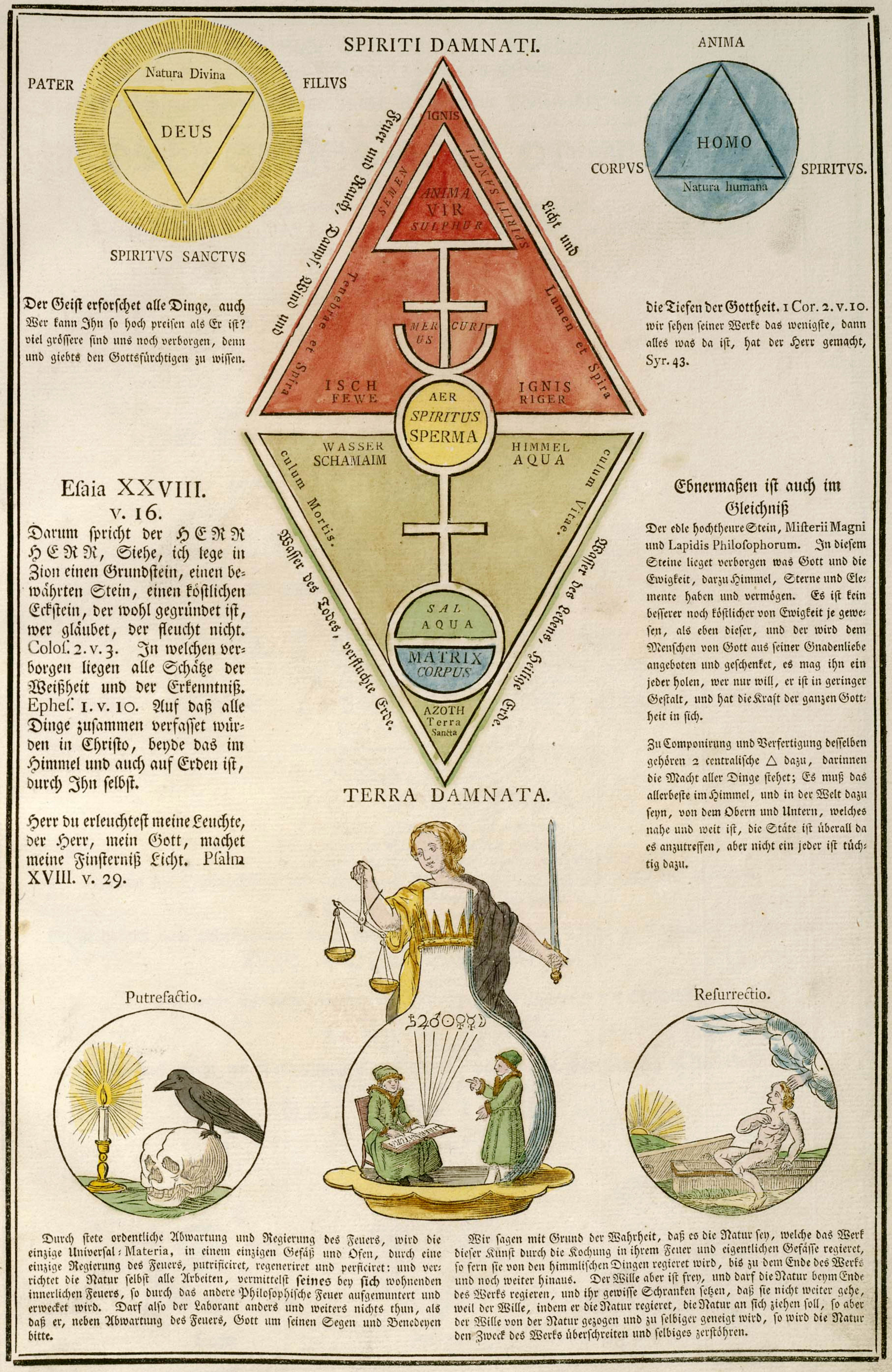
p16 Secret Symbols of the Rosicrucians, 1785

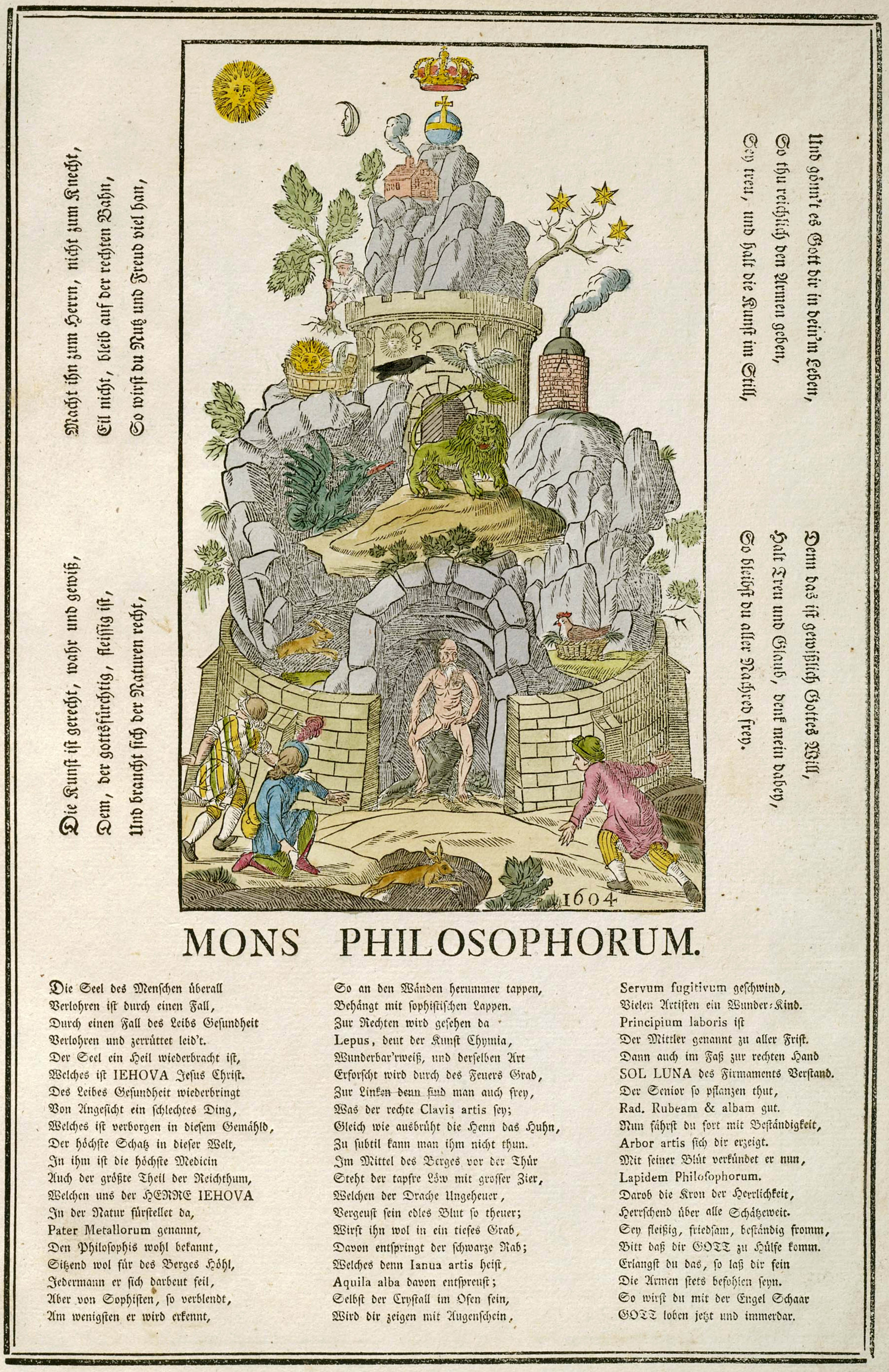
p50 Secret Symbols of the Rosicrucians, 1785

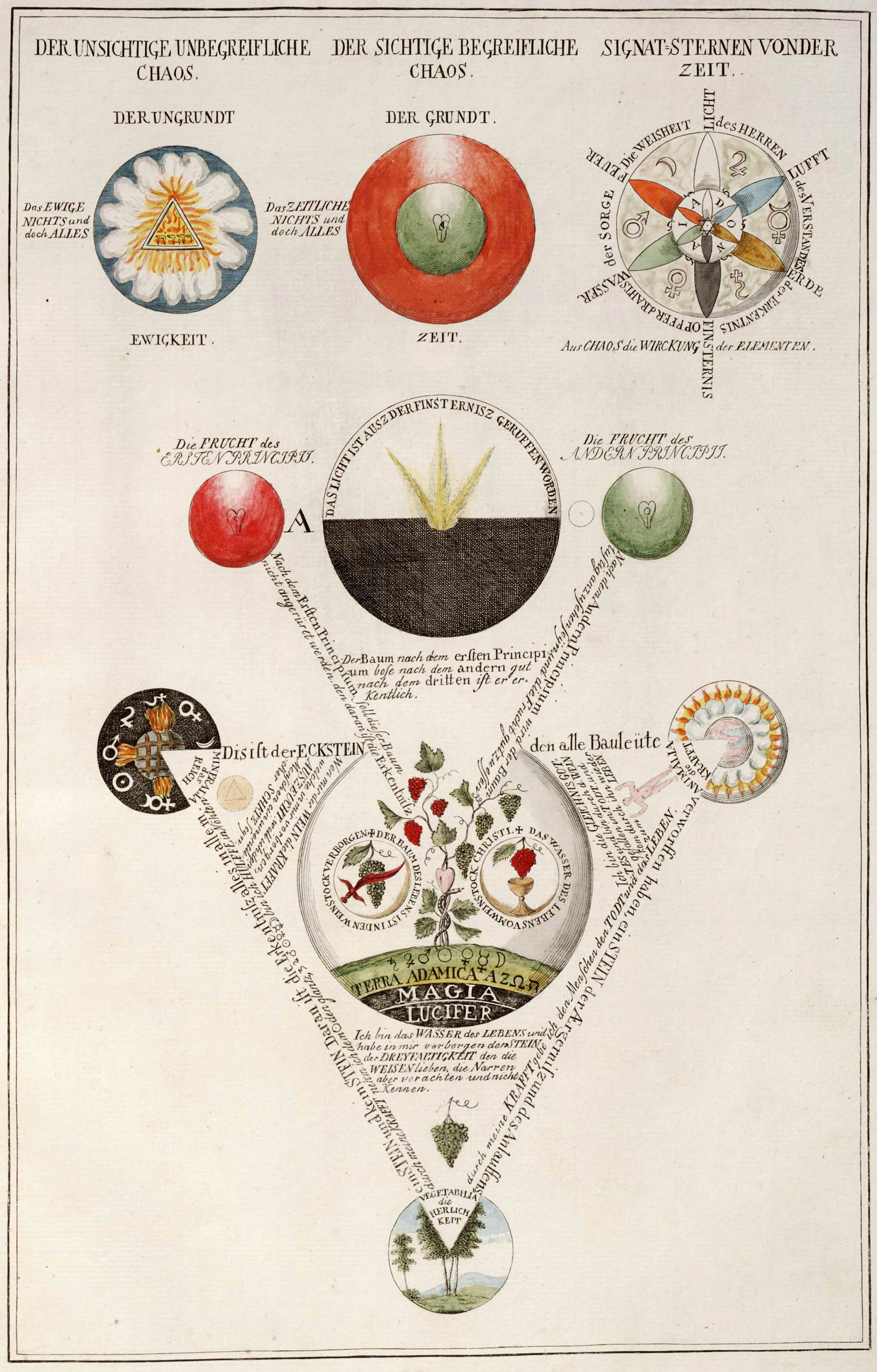
p18 Secret Symbols of the Rosicrucians, 1785
