= Massimiliano Palombara =

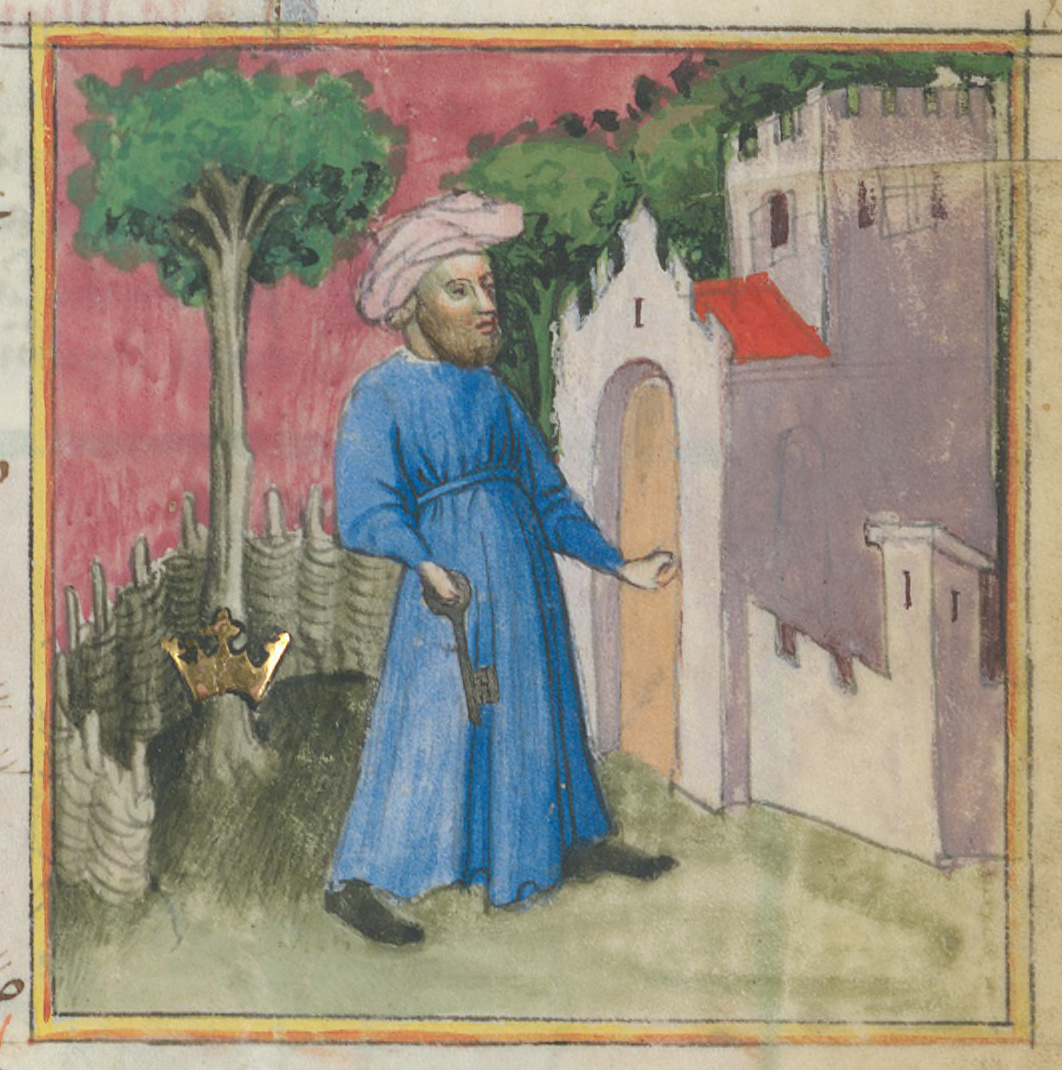
Ibn Umayl enters a magical portal like the one that Massimiliano Palombara had.

Massimiliano Palombara (1614 – 1680) was marquis of Pietraforte and Conservator of Rome between 1651 and 1677. He is the author of the La Bugia (the Candle), a book of verses, written in 1656 in Rome. He built the Villa Palombara which included five gates with occult inscriptions including the still-standing Porta Alchemica.

According to historians, his interest in the occult, Kabbalah and mysticism brought him into contact with Giuseppe Francesco Borri, Cardinal Decio Azzolino and his confidant, Queen Christina of Sweden (then living in Rome having converted to Catholicism).
