= Pelagians (Quietism) =

Catholic lay confraternity charged with heresy

The Pelagians (or Pelagini) were a lay confraternity founded in the church of Santa Pelagia in Milan by the seventeenth century Giacomo Filippo di Santa Pelagia, an Italian lay mystic. Although initially approved of by Catholic authorities, the group was later condemned for alleged heretical practices associated with Quietism.

== Giacomo Filippo di Santa Pelagia ==
Giacomo Filippo di Santa Pelagia, born Giacomo Casolo, was an illiterate beggar in Milan. He took the middle name "Filippo" in honor of the missionary Filippo de Neri. He formed a confraternity in the church of Santa Pelagia to teach piety and mental prayer to the laity. At the time, he was granted the approval of the local Jesuits. After establishing this confraternity, he proceeded to Venice on invitation from associates of the Jesuits.

After his time in Venice, he moved on to Brescia, visiting Valcamonica, a valley in this diocese, where he established an oratory dedicated to Saint Pelagia, after first obtaining permission from Marco Morosini, the Bishop of Brescia, to establish oratories there. Valcamonica became the center of the "Pelagian" movement.

== Church investigation ==
In a 1655 letter to the Holy Congregation of the Holy Office, Carlo Carafa, the nuncio in Venice (later a cardinal), described the Pelagians:

"[They] abhor association with others, asserting that those who do not follow them are in a state of damnation; they flee association even with their own wives, believing they can justifiably divorce them when they do not embrace their doctrine; they forbid listening to Mass, going to Confession and Communion and going to sermons by others; and they disseminate the notion that to be saved mental prayer is enough without the sacrements..."

After this letter was delivered, an investigation was launched by the Inquisitor of Brescia and Cardinal Pietro Ottoboni, bishop of Brescia (later Pope Alexander VIII). The inquiry detailed that the oratories established by Giacomo Filippo di Santa Pelagia in Valcamonica were at first "attended by a small number of lay men and women", but their numbers had increased to around six-hundred. This increase occurred after Marco Antonio Recaldini (also spelled Ricaldini), the Padua-trained archpriest of Pisogne, took direction of the group.

A report by Cardinal Francesco Degli Albizzi on Quietism described the growing role of the oratories:

"Although at the beginning they exercised some spiritual functions, these functions increased in the course of time so that the lay persons arrogated to themselves the practice of preaching, and the women began to assemble in some private houses to make discourses too, concerning material of religion, asserting that the apostles were also poor and ignorant fishermen but nonetheless were allowed to preach. There was also the report of some depraved opinions reigning among that multitude of the inhabitants of Valcamonica, which, from the fact that Giacomo Filippo, the Milanese, worked at converting whores and assembled them in the rooms of the oratory of St. Pelagia in Milan, took the name of Pelagians..."

== Condemnation ==
After Albizzi's report reached Church authorities, a resolution was passed on March 1, 1657 for the Pelagian oratories in Valcamonica to be destroyed and that Marc Antonio Recaldini and seven of his associates were to be banned from Valcamonica and "held in places far from the said valley." Cardinal Ottoboni was charged with the execution of these orders. Ottoboni's execution of these orders, however, did not prevent the continued popularity of "Quietist" circles of lay mystics in Italy.

Giacomo Filippo di Santa Pelagia does not appear to have ever have been condemned himself. He died in Milan in June 1656 before the trial was concluded. The Archpriest of Morbegno was found in 1686 to be "distributing relics of him and collecting materials for his life and miracles." He was forced to abandon this pursuit after receiving a summons from the Inquisitor of Como. Later, the Provost of Talamona was questioned regarding his motives in keeping a devotional picture of Giacomo.

== Aftermath ==
After the 1656 condemnation, leadership was continued by Francesco Catanei and Marc Antonio Ricaldini. Marc Antonio's brother, Agostino Recaldini, a "married layman", may have had even greater influence. He was imprisoned in 1656 and was tortured three times. On September 19, 1660, he was exiled from the Valcamonica to Treviso. He was tried again there, apparently having persisted in his heretical views, and was sentenced to perpetual imprisonment. A book of his was also publicly burnt.

The Church renewed its persecutions in the 1680s, the group having had "maintained a secret existence for over twenty years", spreading beyond its original location to include oratories promoting mental prayer "in Brescia, Verona, Vincenza, Treviso, Padua, Pesaro, Lucca and countless other places."

By 1680, Agosto was free from prison and living under the supervision of the vicar general. Later, he left Treviso for Chiuro in the Valtelline. Antonio Ceccotti, the Inquisitor of Brescia, unsuccessfully attempted to persuade local authorities to extradite Recaldini. Ceccotti's efforts ended when he learned in March 1685 that Recaldini had died on October 6 of the previous year, after having received full sacraments and possessing a reputation for piety.

In Brescia, a related group known as the Pellegrini practiced assiduous mental prayer. They had a membership of about six-hundred and were under the leadership of Bartolommeo Bona, a priest from Saint Rocco. In Verona, Giovanni Battista Bonioli led a group with similar aims, having about thirty members.
