= Francesco Cancellieri =

Italian writer and librarian (1751–1826)

Reverend Francesco Cancellieri
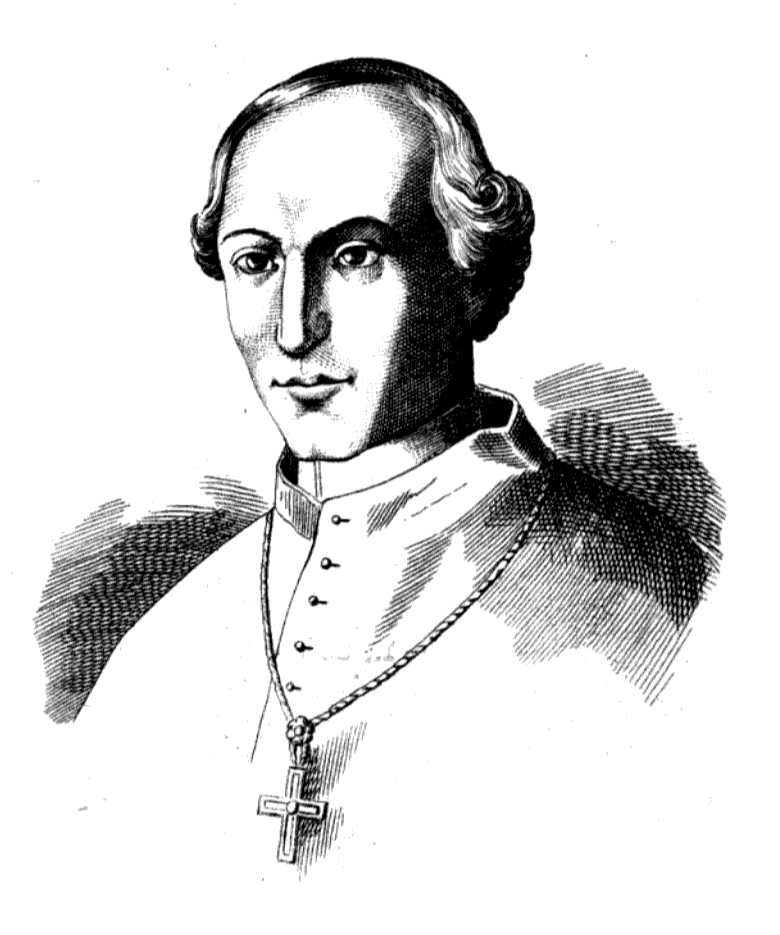
- Francesco Cancellieri
- Born: December 10, 1751; Rome, Papal States
- Died: 29 December 1826 (aged 75); Rome, Papal States
- Occupations: Catholic priest; Librarian; Antiquary

Academic background
- Education: Roman College

Academic work
- Discipline: Classical philology; Classical archaeology

Francesco Girolamo Cancellieri (10 October 1751 – 29 December 1826) was an Italian writer, librarian, and erudite bibliophile.

== Biography ==
Thomas Adolphus Trollope wrote a summary of his biography, which had been extracted were published by a Giuseppe Baraldi in a series called Memorie di religione, di morale, e di letteratura. Francesco's paternal family was from Pistoia originally; his father had been a secretary to Cardinal Paolucci. Francesco was dispatched to be educated by the Jesuits at the Roman College, though he never took vows as a priest. He was employed as secretary for various diplomats in Rome. However, in 1773, he lost important backers when the Suppression of the Jesuits was declared by Pope Clement XIV.

In 1775, Cancellieri was appointed librarian for Cardinal Antonelli, whose library was located in the Palazzo Pamphili in Piazza Navona; this post Cancellieri held till the latter's death in 1811. He lived on No. 63, Via del Mascherone, in a small house adjacent to the church of San Petronio dei Bolognesi. In addition to librarian position, Cancellieri was also Superintendent of the Propaganda printing press, and for a time, Prosigillatore for the Vatican, (Deputy Sealer of Briefs). But the income from these positions was paltry, and for years he was close to insolvency, specially after his protector, Antonelli, died. His publications rarely brought in income, and were often sponsored by those to whom they were dedicated.

In his position as secretary, Cancellieri proved prolific, writing nearly three hundred treatises or books. He was equally a prodigious epistolarian, he sent over 300 letters alone to the historian Tiraboschi. He was amiable and neat in person and language, but never terse; and his style in manners and writing were bountifully steeped with gushingly effusive, but also often grating, cordialities. The poet Leopardi complained that:

Cancellieri is insufferable from the outrageous laudations with which he overwhelms everybody who goes to see him, ... (and) which renders his conversation utterly uninteresting, since one cannot believe a word of it. ... Cancellieri—an old fool, a river of chatter, the most tiresome and insupportable bore on earth. He speaks of absolutely trivial matters with the utmost interest, and of things of high import with the coldest indifference. He smothers you with compliments, and utters them with such a cold indifference that to hear him one would think that it must be the most ordinary thing in the world to be an extraordinary man.

Leopardi in part shows impatience with the overcourteous past, dense with etiquette and flowery witticism, but also his attachment to minutiae unnerved the poet. Trollope states:

The old 18th century bookworm, whose mind, filled to overflowing with odds and ends of archaeological learning ...could never conceive, that his stores could be otherwise than profoundly interesting to all mankind, must necessarily have seemed an unprofitable cumberer of the earth to the young poet, whose brain was busy with meditations on the eternal destinies of man. The gentle old-world courtesies in 'issimo,' ... nauseated the younger man, whose provincial breeding had not taught him to understand that there was no more real insincerity in his aged host's compliments than in the obeisances of a minuet. ... But it may be affirmed, with the most perfect assurance, that Cancellieri's intention and object at the interview was to please and gratify his visitor, whereas the morbid, melancholy, discontented mind of the poet was wholly occupied by his own sensations.

== Legacy ==
His books reflect his style; and, speak generally on the traditions of papal Rome, but also he took time to comment on Tarantism and claims surrounding the origins and actions of Christopher Columbus, about the Catholic liturgy, the sacred and ancient topography of Rome and its surroundings. He wrote about ancient Roman pignora Imperii as well as about the events of Holy week at given chapels. His titles meander as much as his focus inside the books. His essays begin with short islands of statements, but rapidly these are surrounded by an ocean of footnotes, an erudite diluvium of quotations and citations, resembling the style of the modern novel The Mezzanine by Nicholson Baker. The arabesque embroidering of his Rococo eloquence was soon to clash with the terse artillery of the post-Napoleonic speech. Cancillieri was like Boucher in grammar, but the world had turned direct and crisp like Ingres. Cancillieri was educated and focused on the courtly atmosphere and world of the Roman Curia, replete with genuflection, cult, and ritual; and all this was nearly dissipated by the uncompromising grapeshot of post-Revolutionary Napoleonic France.

His memoirs includes the events of 1804, Napoleon forced Pope Pius VII to witness his crowning as emperor, a ceremony meant to recall, although differing in details, the crowning of Charlemagne as Holy Roman Emperor in the year 800. Cancellieri and Cardinal Antonelli, accompanied the papal entourage of carriages which took 22 days in November to reach Fontainbleau. Known as the Bel'Abate, it would not be surprising if he is one of the two courtiers behind the pope, one holding the infamous Napoleon tiara, in the painting on the Coronation of Napoleon by David. Cancellieri describes with great minuteness all the gorgeous ceremony. He accompanied the Pope on his visit to the Louvre, by then replete with looted works.

== Works ==
The manuscripts of Francesco Cancellieri, includes many volumes unpublished and conserved since 1840 in the Biblioteca Apostolica Vaticana. Other manuscripts are in the Biblioteca Nazionale Centrale di Roma (Mss. vari, nn. 902-913).

- Cancellieri, Francesco (1783). Vatican Sacristy erected by the reigning pontiff Pius VI is described by the Roman, Francesco Cancellieri. Rome: Arcangelo Casaletti, Palazzo Massimi.
- Cancellieri, Francesco (1790). Description of the Chapels of Pontiffs and Cardinals of all the ages and of the public and secret consistories.. Rome: Presso Luigi Perego Salvioni, Stampator Vaticano.
- Cancellieri, Francesco (1809). Dissertation of biographical letters of Francesco Cancellieri regarding Christopher Columbus: of Cuccaro in Monferrato, discoverer of America, and Giovanni Gersen of Cavaglia, abbot of San Stafano in Vercelli, author of the book Of Imitations of Christ, to the Signore Cavaliere Gianfrancesco Galeani. Rome.
- Dissertation of F. Cancellieri intorno agli uomini dotati di gran memoria, Rome, 1815.
- Cancellieri, Francesco (1817). Letters of Francesco Cancellieri to the ch. Signore Dottore Koreff, Professor of Medicine of the University of Berlin, about Tarantism, the airs of Roma, and of its countryside, and the Papal palaces inside, and outside, Rome: with the description of the Pontifical Castel Gandolfo, and surrounding countryside. Rome: Presso Francesco Bourlie.
- Cancellieri, Francesco (1818). Description of the functions of the Holy week in the Pontifical Chapel. Fourth Edition. Rome: Presso Francisco Bourlie.
- Cancellieri, Francesco (1821). Collected Biography by Francesco Cancellieri regarding the life and works of the painter cavaliere Giuseppe Errante of Trapani, who died in Rome on February 16, 1821.
- Prospetto delle memorie storiche della basilica ostiense di San Paolo (1823)
- Cancellieri, Francesco (1823). Historical Notices of the church of Santa Maria in Julia, of San Giovanni Calibita in Isola Licaoni, and of San Tommaso degli Spagnuoli o della Catena: called later Santi Giovanni e Petronio de'Bolognesi, with description of paintings by Domenichino and an appendix of documents and inscriptions of Bologna.
- Cancellieri, Francesco (1823). Historical Notices of the Stations and diverse sites in which are held the conclaves inside the city of Rome, with a description of the Great Loggia from which the new Pope is announced.
- Cancellieri, Francesco (1812). Le sette cose fatali di Roma antica (Seven things whose loss was Fatal for Ancient Rome, i.e. Pignora Imperii). Rome: L.P. Salvioni. OL 25091507M.
- Cancellieri, Francesco (1825). Cenotaphium Leonardi Antonelli Cardinalis. Rome.
- Cancellieri, Francesco (1826). Letters about copy in mosaic of the School of Athens by Raphael and the Membrane Codex of Ferdinando cordubense: De consultandi ratione . Rome.
- History of Solemn Possessions of the Head Pontiffs from Leo III to Pio VII (1802)
- Elegy of the clear memory of the most excellent and reverend Signore Cardinal Stefano Borgia, written in a letter by Signore Abate F. Cancellieri, Roma: Nella Stamperia Caetani al Colle Esquilino, 1805
- The Market, the lake of Acqua Vergine, and the Palazzo Pamfili in the Circus Agonale, known vulgarly as Piazza Navona (1811)

== Bibliography ==
- Serafino Siepi, Elogio del chiarissimo abbate Francesco Girolamo Cancellieri romano nato il di' 10 ottobre 1751 e morto il 29 decembre 1826, scritto da Serafino Siepi. In Perugia : dai torchi di Garbinesi e Santucci stampatori camerali, 1827
- Alessandro Moroni, Nuovo catalogo delle opere edite ed inedite dell'abate Francesco Cancellieri : con un ragionamento su la vita e gli scritti del medesimo, del conte Alessandro Moroni. Roma : Tipografia Artigianelli, 1881
- A. Petrucci, "CANCELLIERI, Francesco". In: Dizionario Biografico degli Italiani (on-line)
- Trollope, Thomas Adolphus (1886). A Biographical Notice of the Abate Francesco Cancellieri. Modena. 1828.. The British Quarterly Review, Volume 83 page 280. pp. 280–290.

== Links ==
- Owes in part to Italian Wikipedia entry
