= San Saba =

San Saba can refer to:

== Places ==
Italy

- San Saba, Rome, a church in Rome, Italy
- San Saba, Lazio, a rione in the City of Rome

United States

- San Saba, Texas, a town in Texas, USA
- San Saba County, Texas, a county in Texas, USA
- San Saba River, a river in Texas
- Mission Santa Cruz de San Sabá, one of the Spanish missions in Texas

== Other ==
- San Saba (film), a 2008 film starring Angus Macfadyen and Elisabeth Röhm
