= Ripa (rione of Rome) =

Coordinates: 42°16′N 13°34′E

- Rione of Rome
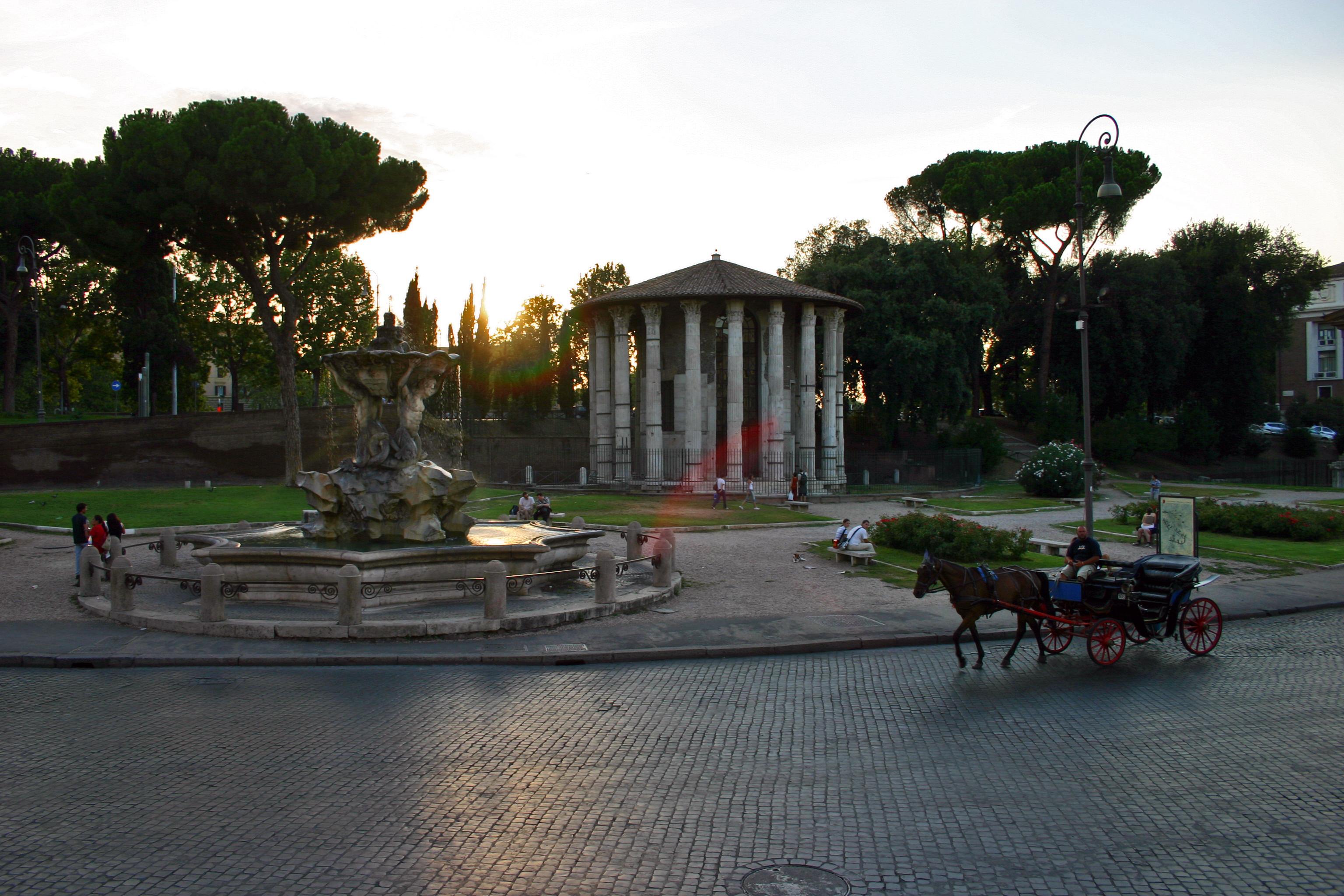
- Piazza Bocca della Verità and the Temple of Hercules

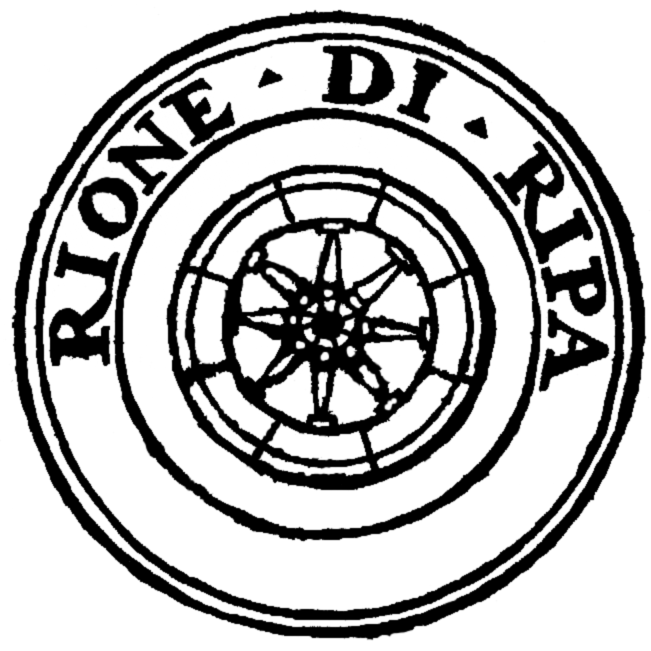
- Seal

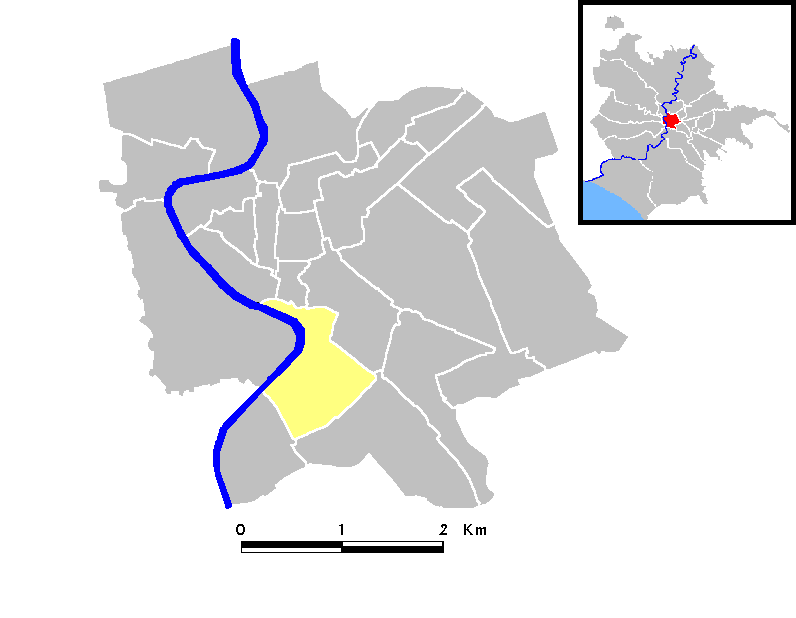
- Position of the rione within the center of the city
- Country: Italy
- Region: Lazio
- Province: Rome
- Comune: Rome
- Time zone: UTC+1 (CET)
  - Summer (DST): UTC+2 (CEST)

Ripa is the 12th rione of Rome, Italy, identified by the initials R. XII, and it is located in the Municipio I.

The coat of arms of the rione depicts a white rudder on a red background, to remind the port of Ripa Grande, that was placed in Trastevere, but faced the rione.

== History ==
The borough has always been urbanized, although not intensively, since the Ancient Rome: at that time, the area included three regiones, Circus Maximus, Piscina Publica and Aventinus.

As of the 4th century, the bank of the River Tiber in the rione was called Ripa Graeca, after a Greek community that settled there and increased during the following centuries, particularly in the 8th century, when the area was inhabited by Greek and Latin people escaped from the iconoclastic persecutions led by Leo III the Isaurian.

During the Middle Ages, the northern part of the rione remained unpopulated, with the only exceptions of some fortified monastery and a baronial castle, the Rocca Savella.

== Geography ==
Initially the rione was ampler and included other portions of the city, that were detached in 1921 in order to establish two more rioni, San Saba and Testaccio.

=== Boundaries ===
Ripa borders northward with Regola (R. VII), whose border is defined by a stretch of the Tiber near the Tiber Island, between Ponte Garibaldi and Ponte Fabricio; as well as with Sant'Angelo (R. XI), from which is separated by Ponte Fabricio itself, by Lungotevere dei Pierleoni and by Via del Foro Olitorio. To the northeast, it also borders with Campitelli (R. X), from which is separated by Vico Jugario, Piazza della Consolazione, Via dei Fienili, Via di San Teodoro, Via dei Cerchi and Piazza di Porta Capena.

Eastward, the rione shares a short border with Celio (R. XIX), from which is separated by Piazza di Porta Capena.

To the south, Ripa borders with San Saba (R. XXI), whose boundary is outlined by Viale Aventino, Piazza Albania, Viale Manlio Gelsomini and Largo Manlio Gelsomini; and with Testaccio (R. XX), from which is separated by Largo Manlio Gelsomini, Via Marmorata and Piazza dell'Emporio.

Westward, Ripa is separated from Trastevere (R. XIII) by the stretch of the Tiber between Ponte Sublicio and Ponte Garibaldi.

== Places of interest ==
=== Archaeological sites ===
- Remains of the Forum Boarium
- Circus Maximus
- Temple of Hercules Victor

=== Churches ===
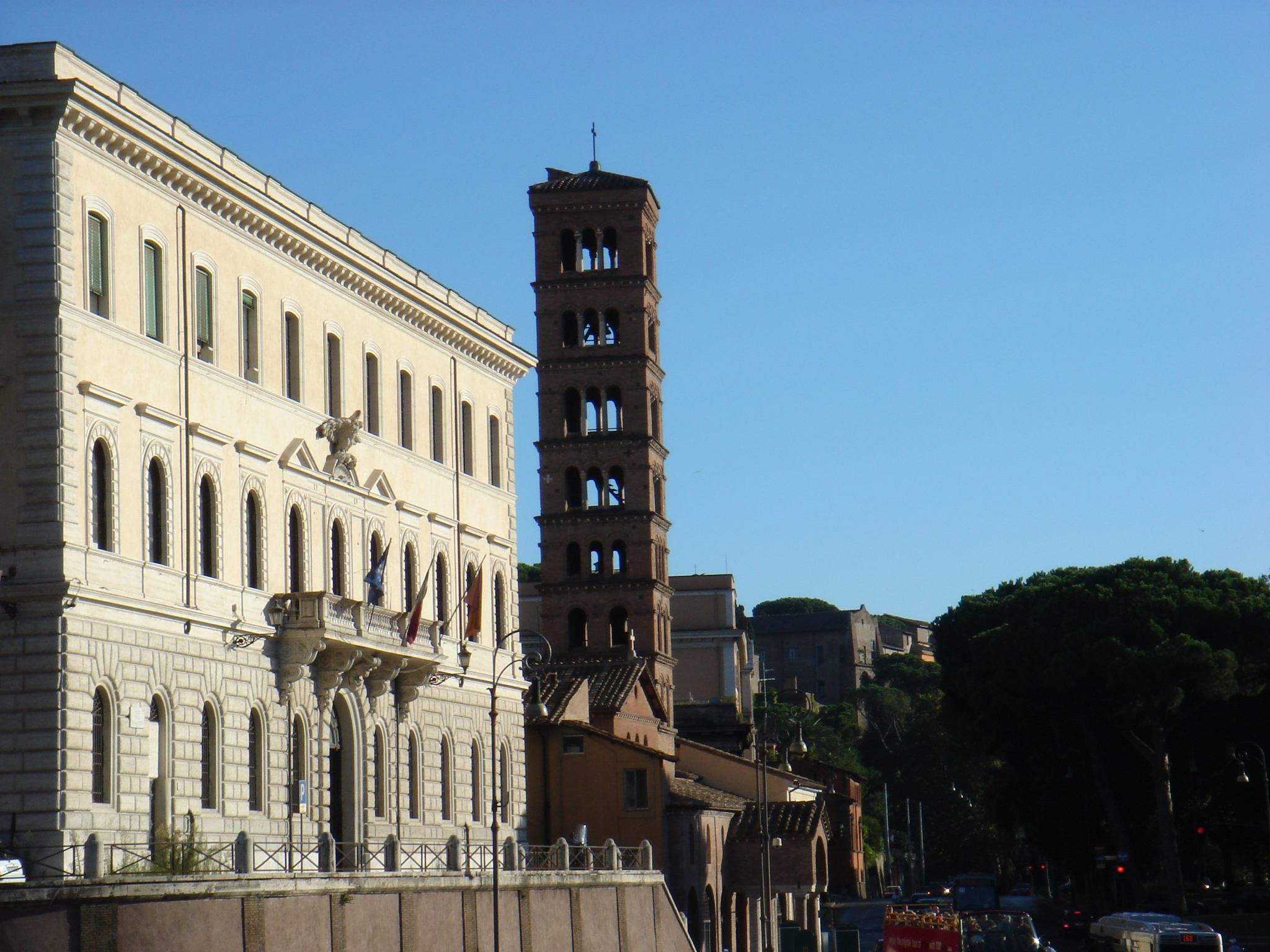
Palazzo Pantanella and the church of Santa Maria in Cosmedin

- San Vincenzo de Paoli all'Aventino
- Sant'Omobono
- Santa Prisca
- Santa Sabina
- Santi Bonifacio e Alessio
- Sant'Anselmo all'Aventino
- Santa Maria del Priorato
- San Giorgio in Velabro
- San Giovanni Battista Decollato
- Sant'Eligio dei Ferrari
- Santa Maria in Cosmedin
- San Bartolomeo all'Isola
- San Giovanni Calibita

=== Roads and squares ===
- Piazza Albania
- Piazza Bocca della Verità

=== Other ===
- Villa del Priorato di Malta
- Giardino degli Aranci
