= Lungotevere dei Pierleoni =

- Interactive map of Lungotevere dei Pierleoni
- Namesake: The Pierleoni family
- Type: Lungotevere
- Location: Rome, Italy
- Quarter: Ripa
- Coordinates: 41.8898°N 12.4806°E
- From: Piazza di Monte Savello
- To: Ponte Palatino

Construction
- Inauguration: July 20, 1887

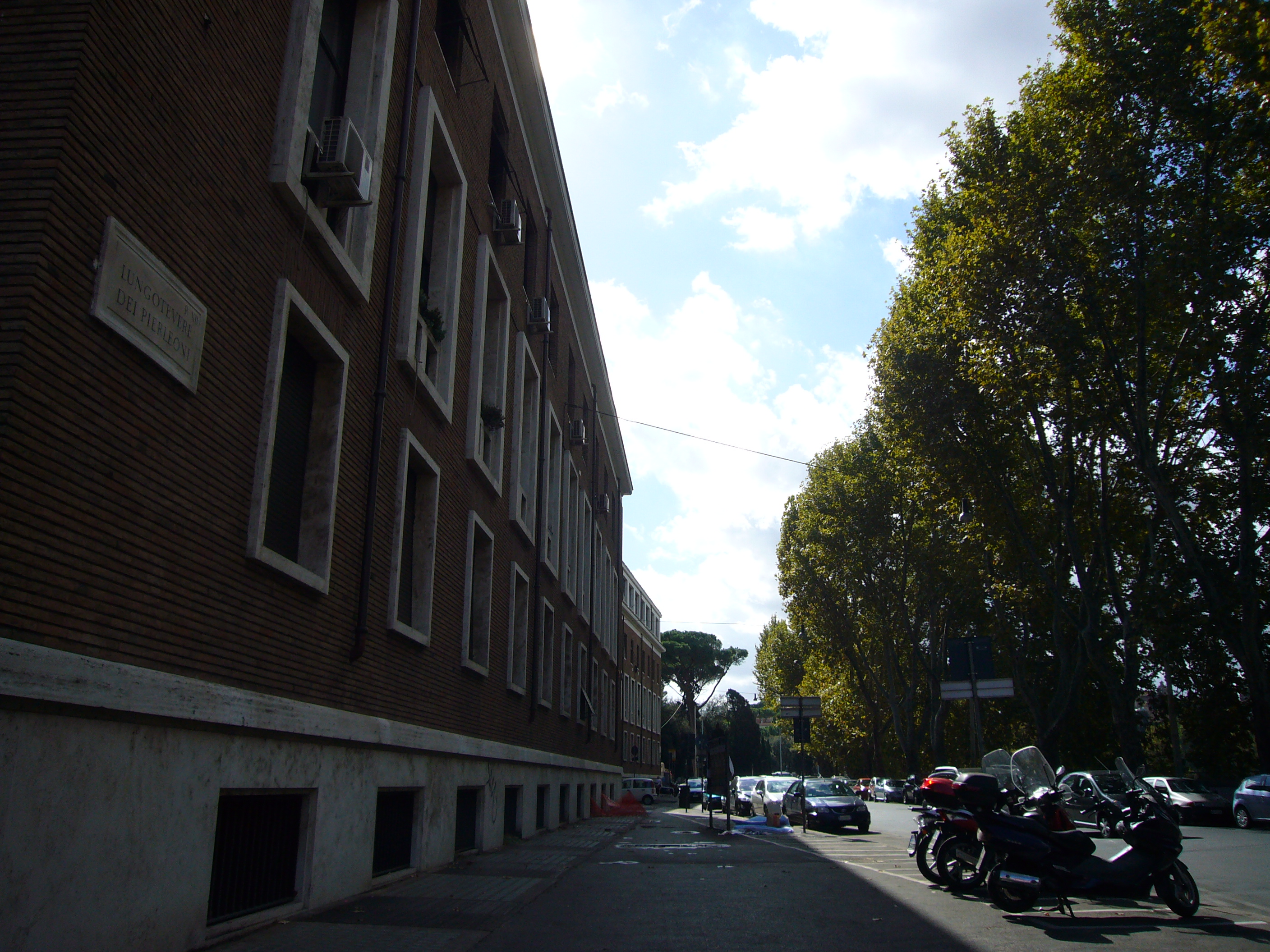
Lungotevere dei Pierleoni

Lungotevere dei Pierleoni is the stretch of lungotevere which links Piazza di Monte Savello to Ponte Palatino, in Rome, in rione Ripa.

This lungotevere is named after the ancient Roman family of the Pierleoni, which owned houses, towers and a fortress on the shore of the Tevere; it was instituted with law of 20 July 1887.

== Sources ==
- Rendina, Claudio; Paradisi, Donatella (2004). Le strade di Roma. 3rd volume P-Z. Newton Compton Editori, Rome. ISBN 88-541-0209-1.
