= Campitelli =

Coordinates: 41°53′17″N 12°29′11″E

- Rione of Rome
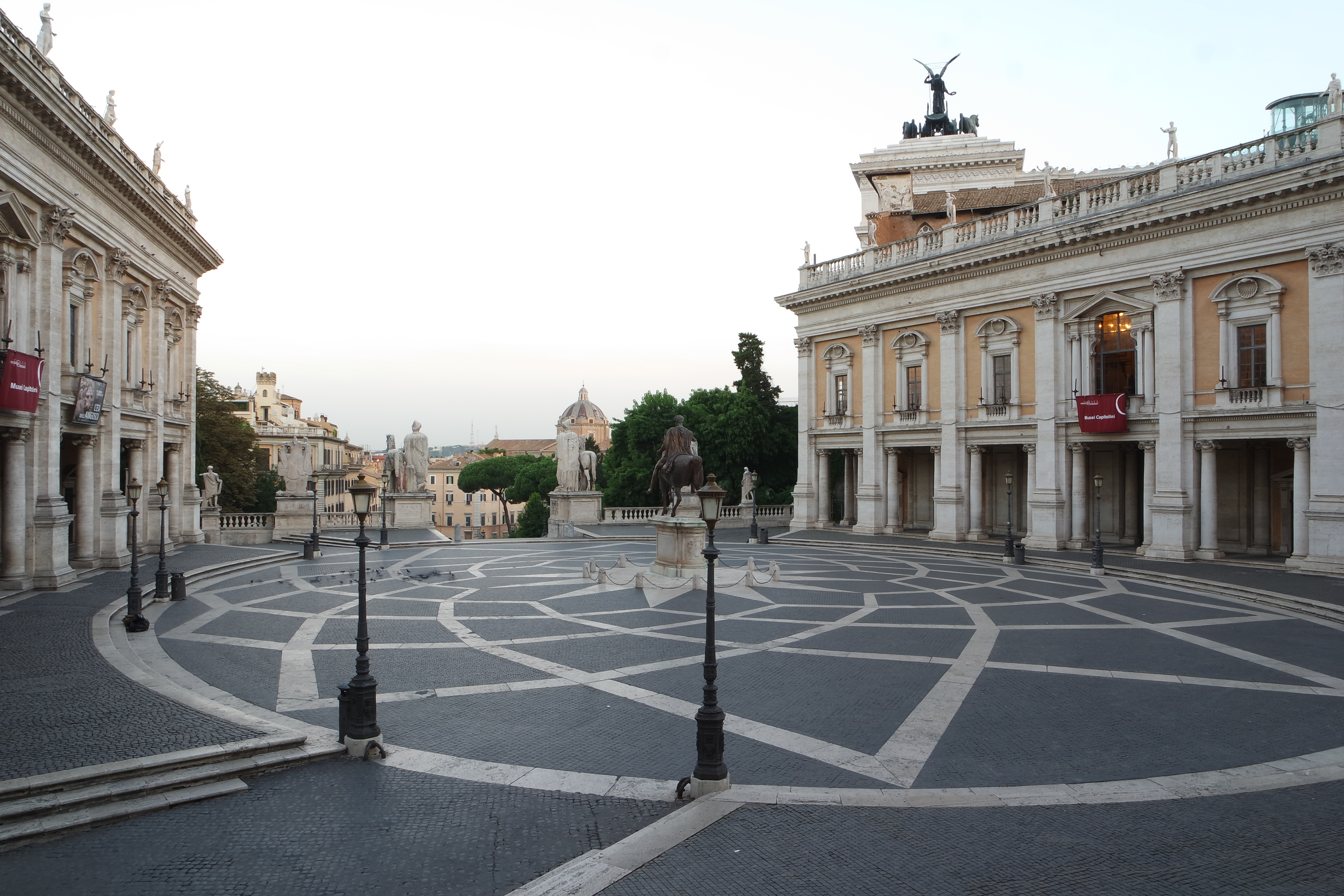
- Piazza del Campidoglio

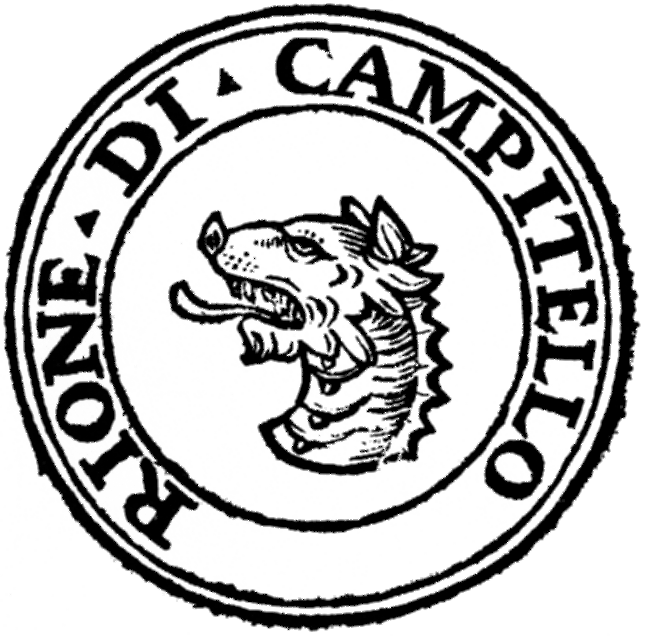
- Seal

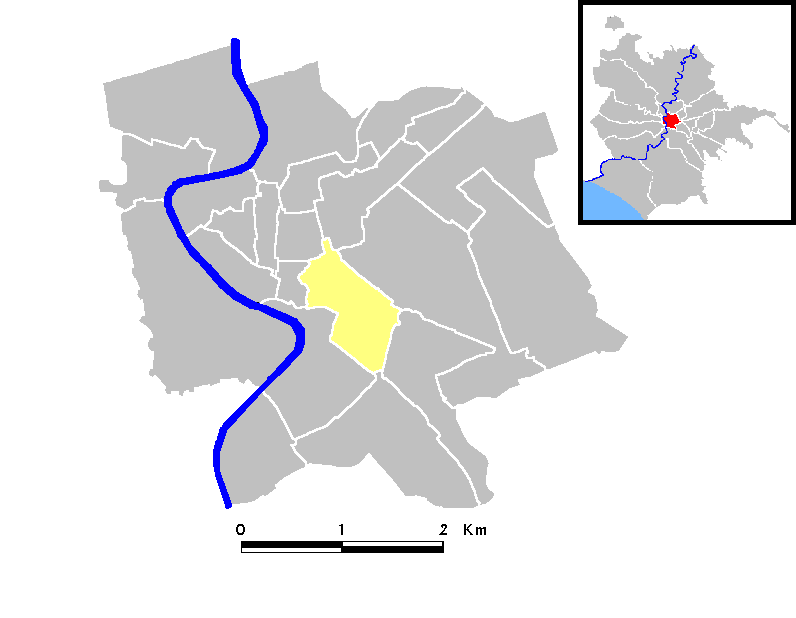
- Position of the rione within the center of the city
- Country: Italy
- Region: Lazio
- Province: Rome
- Comune: Rome
- Time zone: UTC+1 (CET)
  - Summer (DST): UTC+2 (CEST)

Campitelli is the 10th rione of Rome, Italy, identified by the initials R. X, and is located in the Municipio I.

Its emblem consists of a black dragon's head on a white background. This symbol comes from the legend that Pope Silvester I threw out a dragon staying in the Forum Romanum.

== History ==
Some of the major vestiges of the Ancient Rome are located in the area, such as the Palatine Hill, the Campidoglio and the Roman Forum.

When in the Middle Ages the new administrative subdivision of the city was adopted, Campitelli was the 12th and last rione. It was called Campitelli in Sancti Adriani, after the deconsecrated church of Sant'Adriano al Foro. Since the 12th century, the Palazzo Senatorio became the seat of the Senatore di Roma (lit. 'Senator of Rome'), the principal civic authority of the city in the Middle Ages. The Palazzo Senatorio and the basilica of Santa Maria in Ara Coeli are the only remaining features of the medieval construction industry in the rione.

The rione experienced relevant urban modifications between 1536 and 1546, after Pope Paul III commissioned to Michelangelo the refurbishment of the Campidoglio and of the nearby piazza, to receive Emperor Charles V. Michelangelo's project was brought to completion only in 18th century by Carlo Rainaldi, who built the baroque church of Santa Maria in Campitelli.

The appearance of the area changed relevantly between 19th and 20th century, after the construction of the Victor Emmanuel II Monument and after the massive demolitions performed by the Fascist government.

In 1921 a part of Campitelli was detached and merged into the newly created rione Celio.

== Geography ==
=== Boundaries ===
Northward, the rione borders with Pigna (R. IX), whose border is marked by Via di San Marco, Largo Enrico Berlinguer and Piazza Venezia, and also with Trevi (R. II), from which is separated by Piazza Venezia itself and Piazza della Madonna di Loreto.

Eastward, the rione borders with Monti (R. I), the boundary being marked by the whole Via dei Fori Imperiali, and with Celio (R. XIX), from which is separated by Piazza del Colosseo, Via di San Gregorio and Piazza di Porta Capena.

Southward, the border with Ripa (R. XII) is defined by Via dei Cerchi, Via di San Teodoro, Via dei Fienili, Piazza della Consolazione and Vico Jugario.

To the west, the rione borders with Sant'Angelo (R. XI), whose border is marked by Via del Teatro di Marcello, Via Montanara, Piazza di Campitelli, Via Cavalletti, Via dei Delfini, Piazza Margana, Via Margana and Via d'Aracoeli.

== Places of interest ==
=== Archaeological Sites ===
- Roman Forum
- Mamertine Prison
- Domus Augustana
- Domus Flavia
- Domus Severiana
- Insula Romana
- Curia, Roman Forum
- Palace of Domitian
- Temple of Antoninus and Faustina
- Temple of the Dioscuri
- Temple of Divine Julius
- Temple of Divine Romulus
- Temple of Venus and Rome
- Temple of Vesta
- Basilica of Maxentius
- Basilica Julia
- Arch of Septimus Severus
- Arch of Titus
- Column of Phocas

=== Palaces and other buildings ===
- Campidoglio
- Palazzo Albertoni Spinola
- Palazzo Astalli
- Palazzo Caffarelli al Campidoglio
- Palazzo Capizucchi
- Palazzo Senatorio
- Palazzo dei Conservatori
- Palazzo Massimo di Rignano
- Palazzo Muti Bussi

=== Museums ===
- Musei Capitolini
- Museo centrale del Risorgimento

=== Churches ===
- Santa Maria in Aracoeli
- Basilica of Santa Francesca Romana
- San Bonaventura al Palatino
- San Sebastiano al Palatino
- Santi Cosma e Damiano
- San Lorenzo in Miranda
- Santa Maria Antiqua
- Santi Luca e Martina
- San Giuseppe dei Falegnami
- Santa Maria Annunziata a Tor de' Specchi
- Santa Maria della Consolazione
- San Teodoro al Palatino
- Basilica of Sant'Anastasia al Palatino
- San Biagio de Mercato (deconsecrated)
- Sant'Adriano al Foro Romano (deconsecrated)
- Santa Maria Liberatrice al Foro Romano (dismantled)
- Santi Venanzio e Ansovino (dismantled)
- Santi Sergio e Bacco al Foro Romano (dismantled)

=== Roads and squares ===
- Piazza del Campidoglio
- Piazza Campitelli
- Piazza Venezia

=== Other ===
- Palatine Hill
