= Rioni (disambiguation) =

The Rioni is a river in Western Georgia, known to the ancient Greeks as the Phasis.

Rioni is also the plural form of Rione, an Italian entity of local government. E.g. Rioni of Rome
