= Celio (rione of Rome) =

Coordinates: 41°52′54″N 12°29′43″E

- Rione of Rome
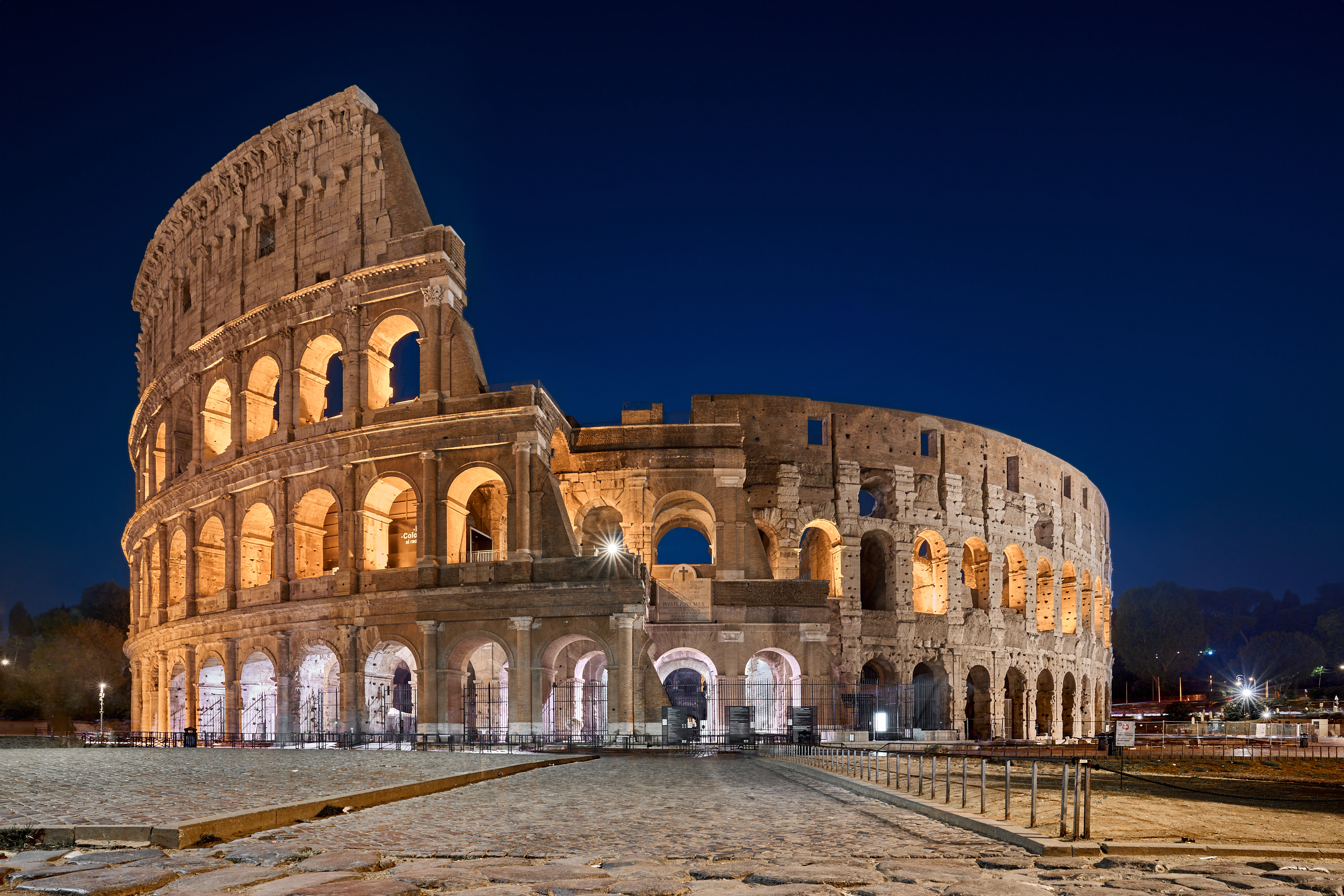
- A night view of the Colosseo

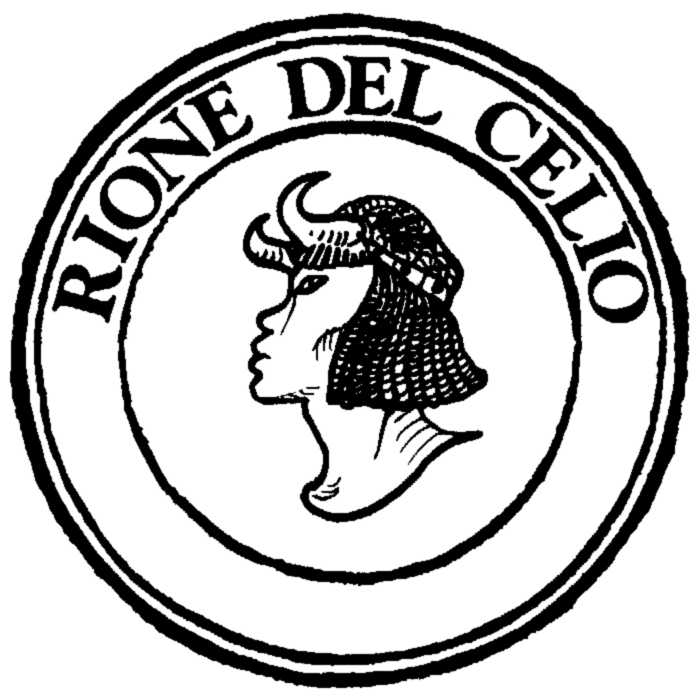
- Seal

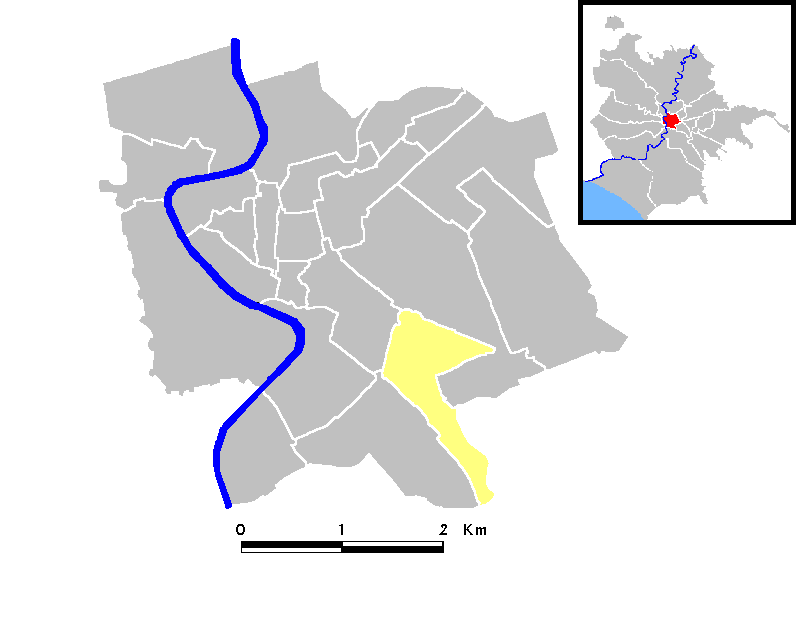
- Position of the rione within the center of the city
- Country: Italy
- Region: Lazio
- Province: Rome
- Comune: Rome
- Time zone: UTC+1 (CET)
  - Summer (DST): UTC+2 (CEST)

Celio (Italian: [ˈtʃɛːljo]) is the 19th rione of Rome, Italy, identified by the initials R. XIX, and is located within the Municipio I.

Its coat of arms depicts the bust of an African, with an elephant headdress with golden tusks on a silver background, in memory of an African bust that was found in Via Capo d'Africa.

== History ==
Up to 1870, the area was moderately inhabited, with some major religious building and many archaeological remains appearing in the vast filed and vineyards. Following to the unification of Italy, the district was among the first to be urbanized, between 1872 and 1873, with new service buildings and residences for the newcomers.

Particularly, a military hospital was built on the summit of the Caelian hill between 1885 and 1891, close to the medieval site of Santo Stefano in Formis, an ancient monastery with an annexed hospital.

Up until the postwar period, the road scheme has been reworked in the lower part of the rione, near the Colosseo, and in 1968 a big public housing complex, that was located among Piazza Celimontana, Via Claudia, Via Annia and Via dei Simmachi, was demolished: the plot, facing the military hospital, is now a public park (Parco della Pace).

== Geography ==
The rione was established in 1921, detaching portions of land from Monti and Campitelli. It is moderately inhabited and scarcely congested, and can be considered a working-class borough, if compared with more central rioni.

The rione is dense with hotels and B&Bs, restaurants, and bars for tourists, because of its position, very close to the Colosseo.

=== Boundaries ===
Northward, Celio borders with Monti (R. I), from which is separated by Piazza del Colosseo, Via di San Giovanni in Laterano, Via di Santo Stefano Rotondo, Via della Navicella and Piazza di Porta Metronia.

Eastward, it borders with Quartiere Appio-Latino (Q. IX), whose boundary is defined by the stretch of the Aurelian Walls between Porta Metronia and Porta San Sebastiano.

To the south, it borders with San Saba (R. XXI), from which is separated by Via di Porta San Sebastiano, Piazzale Numa Pompilio, Viale delle Terme di Caracalla, Via di Valle delle Camene.

Westward, Celio shares a short border with Ripa (R. XII), marked by Piazza di Porta Capena. It also borders with Campitelli (R. X), whose boundary is marked by Via di San Gregorio and Piazza del Colosseo.

=== Transportation ===
The Rome Metro's relatively new Line C cuts through Celio. As of 2026, Line C stations in Celio include Colosseo (Rome Metro) and Porta Metronia (Rome Metro).

== Places of interest ==
=== Archaeological sites ===
- Arch of Constantine
- Arch of Dolabella
- Colosseo
- Ludus Magnus
- Villa Celimontana

=== Churches ===
- San Giovanni a Porta Latina
- San Giovanni in Oleo
- San Gregorio Magno al Celio
- Santa Maria in Domnica (Santa Maria alla Navicella)
- Santo Stefano Rotondo
- Santi Giovanni e Paolo
- Santi Quattro Coronati

=== Other ===
- Fontana della Navicella
