= Felicior Augusto, melior Traiano =

Roman phrase

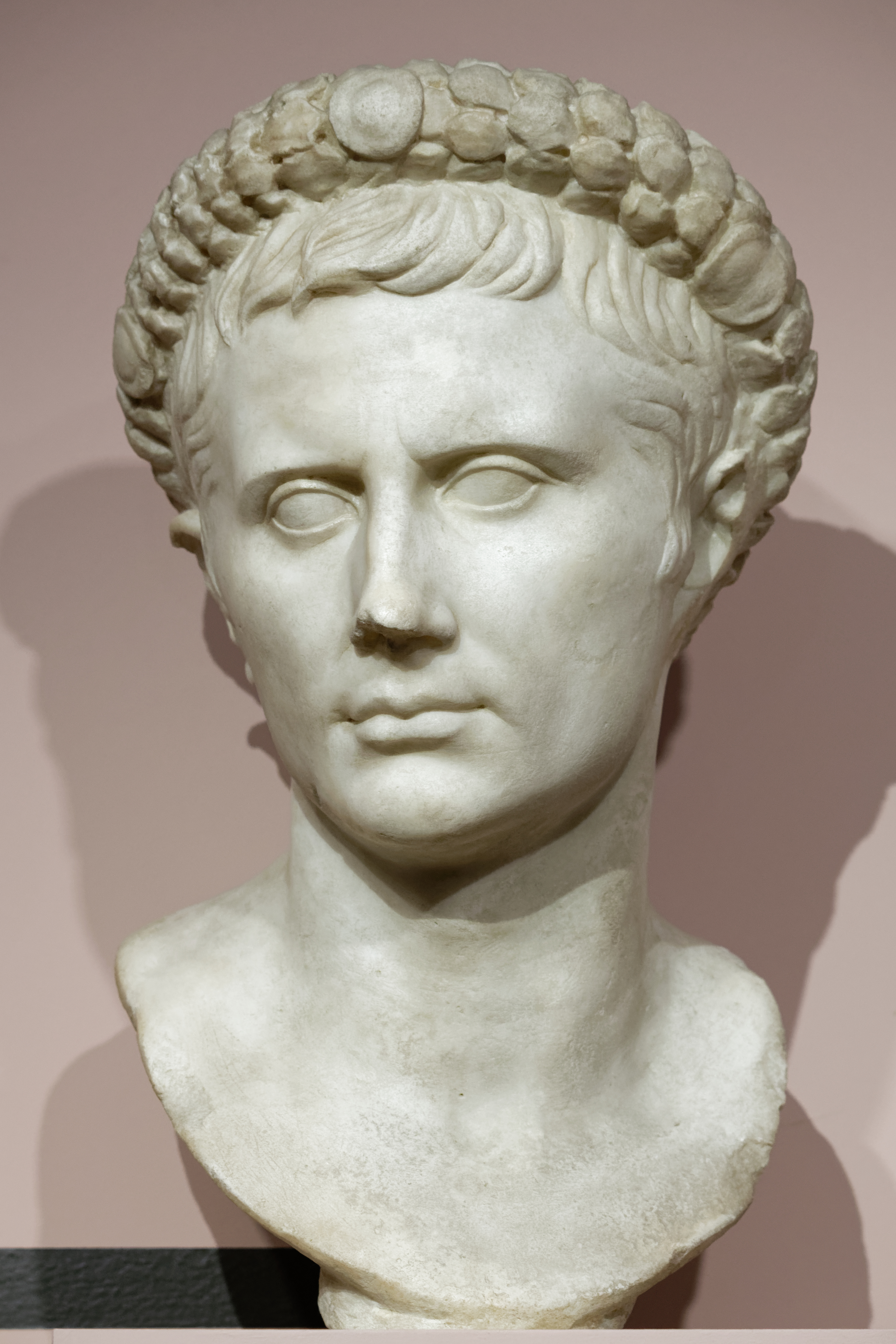
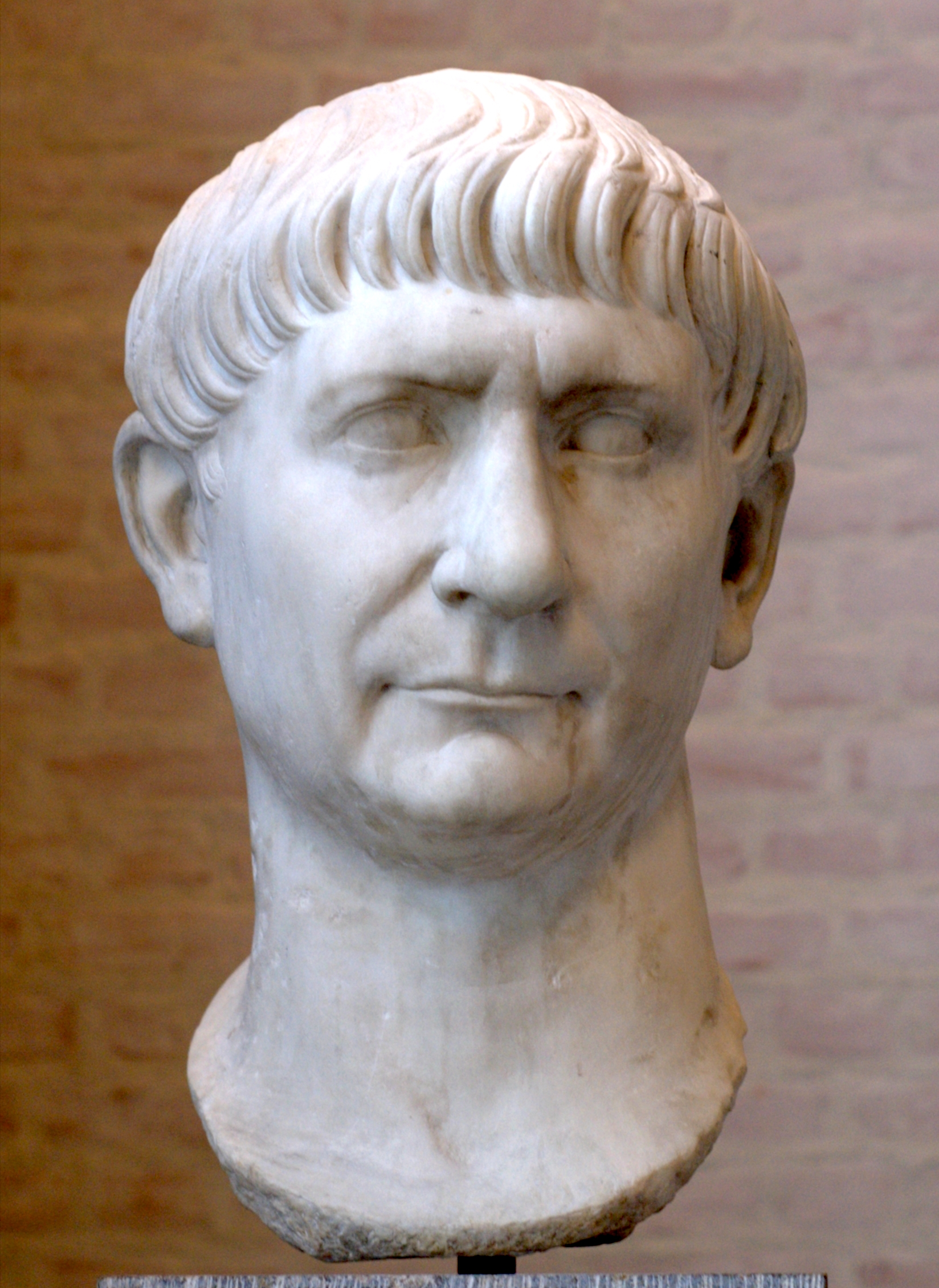
Augustus (left) and Trajan (right).

Felicior Augusto, melior Traiano or Sis felicior Augusto, melior Traiano (Latin: "be more fortunate than Augustus [and] better than Trajan) was the formula delivered in the Roman Senate at the inauguration of late Roman emperors. The phrase refers to the perceived well-being of the empire during the reigns of Augustus and Trajan. Particularly, it recalls the divine favour Augustus supposedly enjoyed, as well as Trajan's title Optimus, expressing the senatorial memory of Trajan as an exemplar of imperial modesty.

After the setbacks of the third century, Augustus and Trajan became in the Later Roman Empire the paragon of the most positive traits of the Imperial order. The phrase was in use until at least the 4th century AD, when the Roman Empire had dramatically changed in character from what it had been under Trajan's rule.
