= Viale Aventino =

Street in Rome, Italy

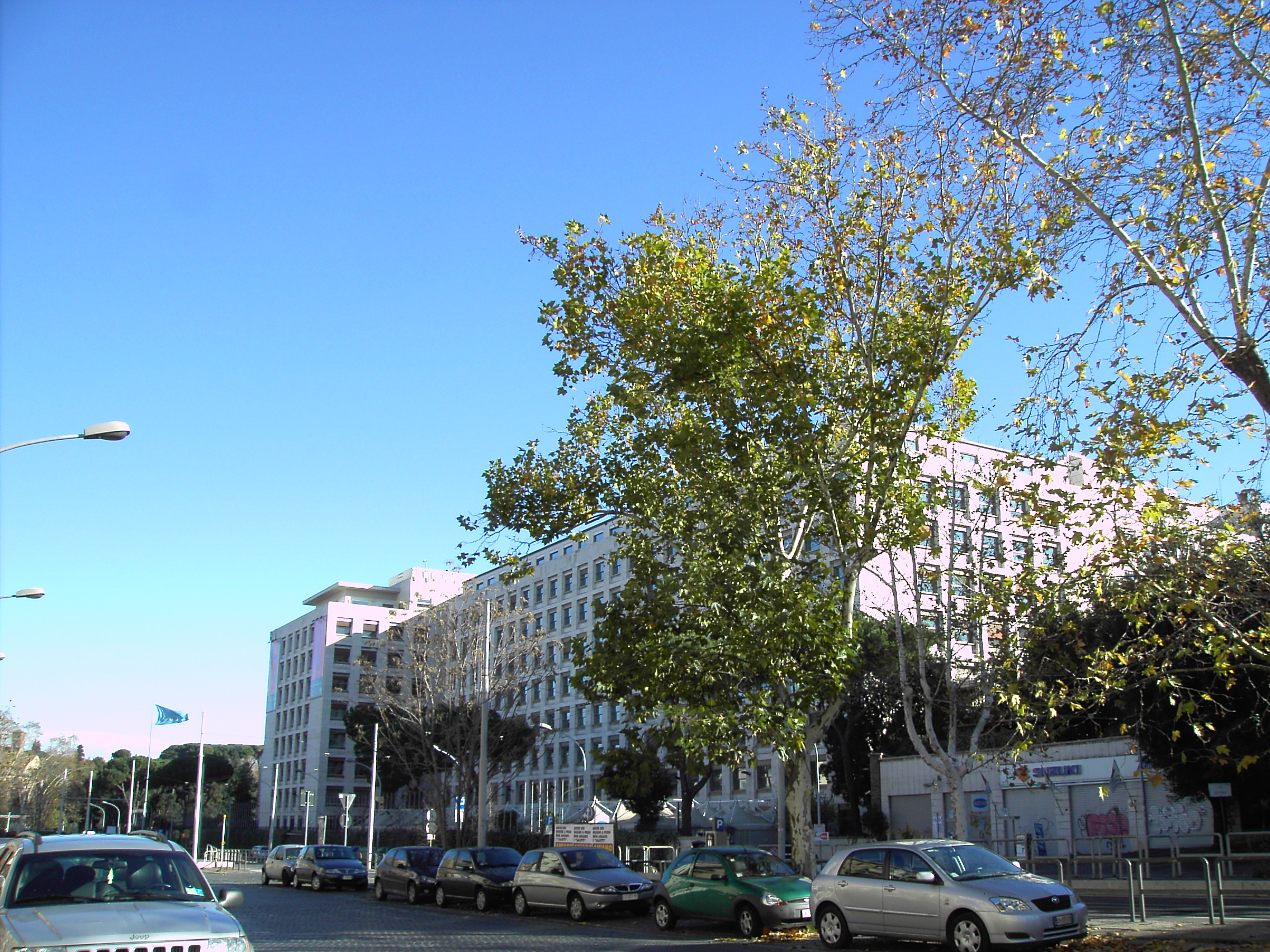
Viale Aventino and Palazzo FAO

Viale Aventino is a street that links Piazza di Porta Capena and Piazza Albania in Rome (Italy). It marks the boundary between the Rione Ripa (towards the Aventine Hill) and San Saba (towards the Baths of Caracalla).

The street was built in the 1930s as a major route intended for the linking between Via Ostiense, the station of the Rome–Lido railway at Porta San Paolo and the Roma Ostiense railway station: it started from Piazza del Circo Massimo (now Piazza di Porta Capena) and ended in Via Marmorata. The first stretch of the street – giving a view over the Circus Maximus – houses the palace of the Food and Agriculture Organization (FAO), formerly built as the seat of the Ministry of the Colonies; for this reason, the first name of the street, adopted in 1938, was Viale Africa. At that time the urbanization of the surrounding area was just at its first steps, so the street had been conceived as an urban promenade, with large sidewalks, four rows of buttonwoods and a tram-line in the middle.

The former denomination was suppressed in 1945 and replaced with the present one. In 1955 the name of the last stretch, between Piazza Albania and Via Marmorata, was changed into Viale Manlio Gelsomini. The buttonwoods, which in the 1990s were infected by ceratocystis fimbriata, have been replaced at the beginning of the 2000s with lime trees and oaks.

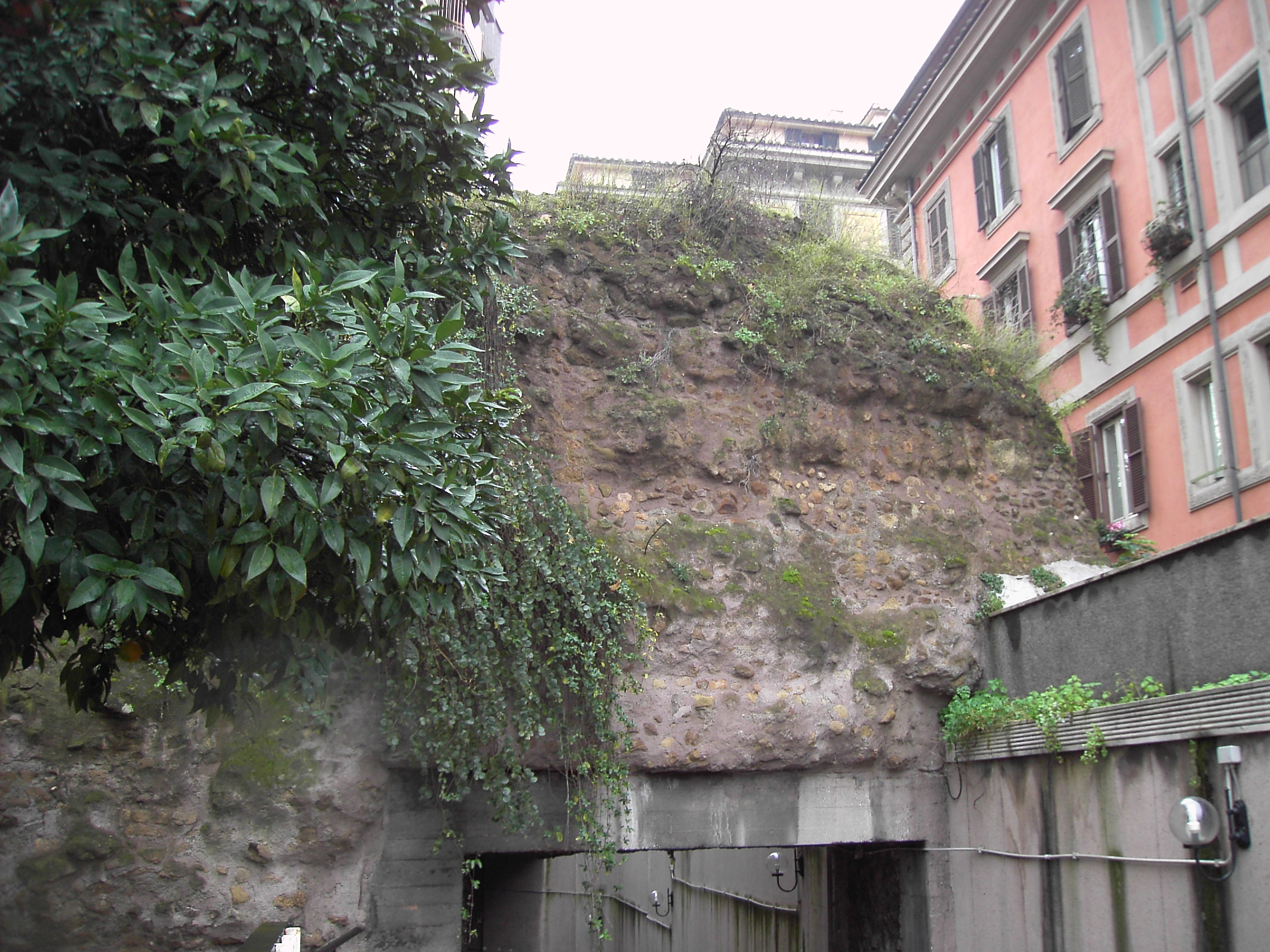
Remains of the Servian Wall facing on Viale Aventino.

Viale della Piramide Cestia, that lengthen the street from Piazza Albania to Piazza di Porta San Paolo, cuts the circle of the Servian Wall, built during the Roman Republic: some remains are still visible in the surroundings of Piazza Albania.

== Bibliography ==
- Rendina, Claudio; Paradisi, Donatella (2004). Le strade di Roma. 1st Volume A-D. Rome: Newton Compton Editori. ISBN 88-541-0208-3.
