= FAO Headquarters =

Coordinates: 41.8827°N 12.4886°E

FAO Building
- Palazzo FAO
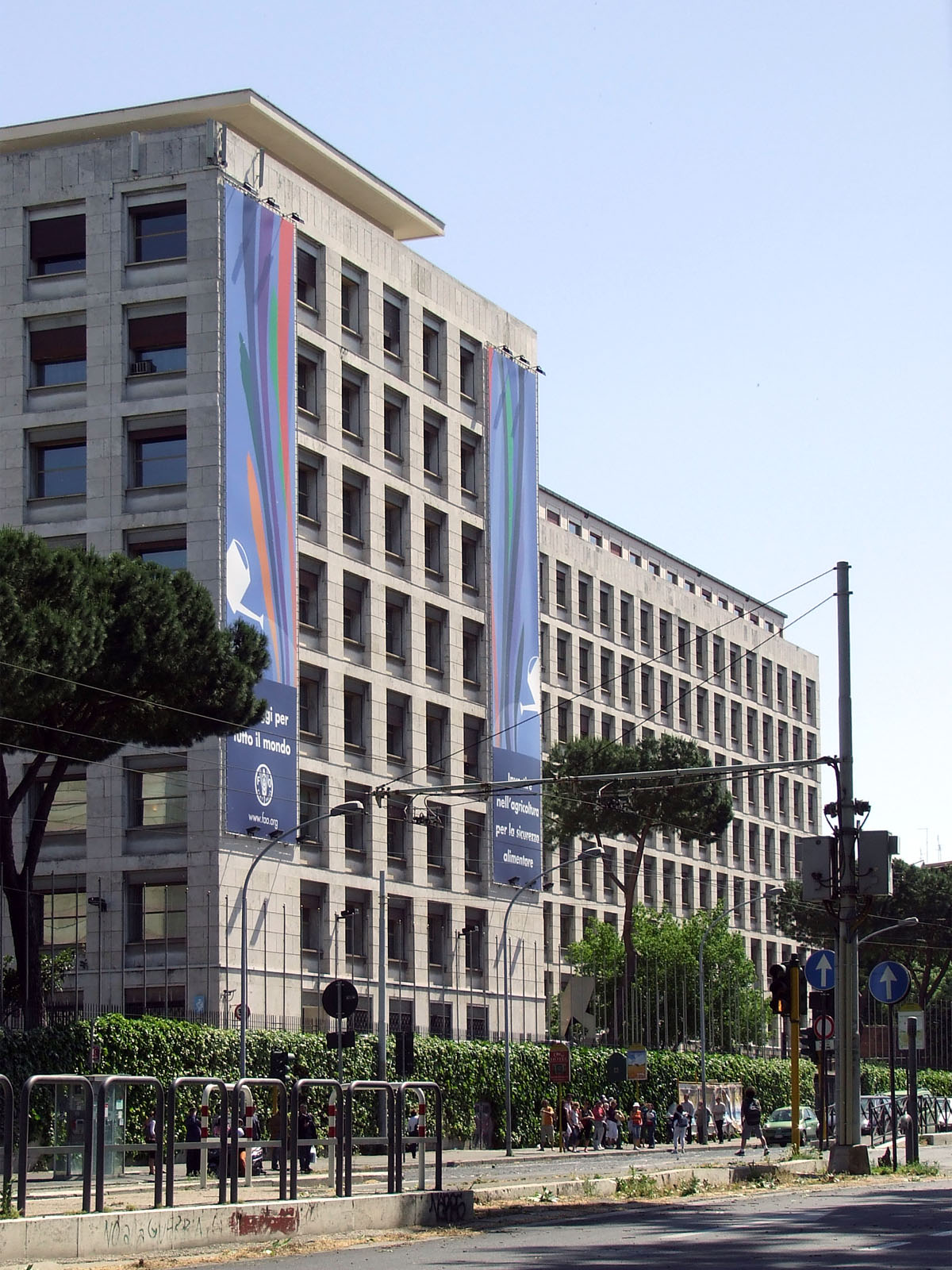
- Interactive map of the FAO Building area

General information
- Location: Rome, Viale delle Terme di Caracalla, Italy
- Construction started: 1938
- Completed: 1952
- Inaugurated: 1952
- Owner: Loaned to FAO by Italian State

Design and construction
- Architects: Vittorio Cafiero, Mario Ridolfi

The FAO Building (Italian: Palazzo FAO, literally "FAO Palace") is the international headquarters of the Food and Agriculture Organization (FAO), located in the San Saba rione of Rome, Italy. Originally built under the Fascist government of Italy in the 1930s to be the seat of the Ministry of Italian Africa, the building was repurposed after World War II to be the headquarters of the then-new United Nations' agricultural agency, the FAO. The building is located the in one of the most scenic parts of Rome, southeast of the Aventine Hill, and overlooking the Baths of Caracalla and the Circus Maximus.

== History ==
The building was designed in 1938 by Vittorio Cafiero, the designer of the city plan of Asmara, and Mario Ridolfi, one of the masters of Italian Rationalism, and was originally designated to be the seat of the Ministry of Italian Africa: this was named until 1937, the year of the Italian conquest of Ethiopia, the Ministry of the Colonies, and was abolished in 1953. In front of the enormous building a four lane avenue was opened; it was named "Viale Africa" after it, and renamed "Viale Aventino", after the hill which faces the building, in 1945. The palace was still unfinished when Italy surrendered to the allies in September 1943. The construction works, now directed only by Cafiero, started again in 1947, and the building was supposed to host the Ministry of Post and Telecommunication. After the decision to assign the edifice to FAO, the building was enlarged, and work was finished in 1952. The Italian State endowed to the building the right of extraterritoriality, and rented it to FAO for the symbolic rate of one US dollar, to be paid yearly in advance.

In 1937, after the invasion of Ethiopia, Italian army specialists had brought to Rome the second longest Stele among the many existing in Axum. The 4th-century monolith, which in Ethiopia lay for centuries on the ground and was broken in several pieces, was erected in front of the area designated to host the Ministry of Italian Africa building, in order to show the usage of the new complex. In 2005, after restoration, the stele was taken back to Ethiopia and erected in Axum by the Italian Government.
