= Via Merulana =

Street in the Rione Monti of Rome, Italy

Coordinates: 41.8897°N 12.5032°E

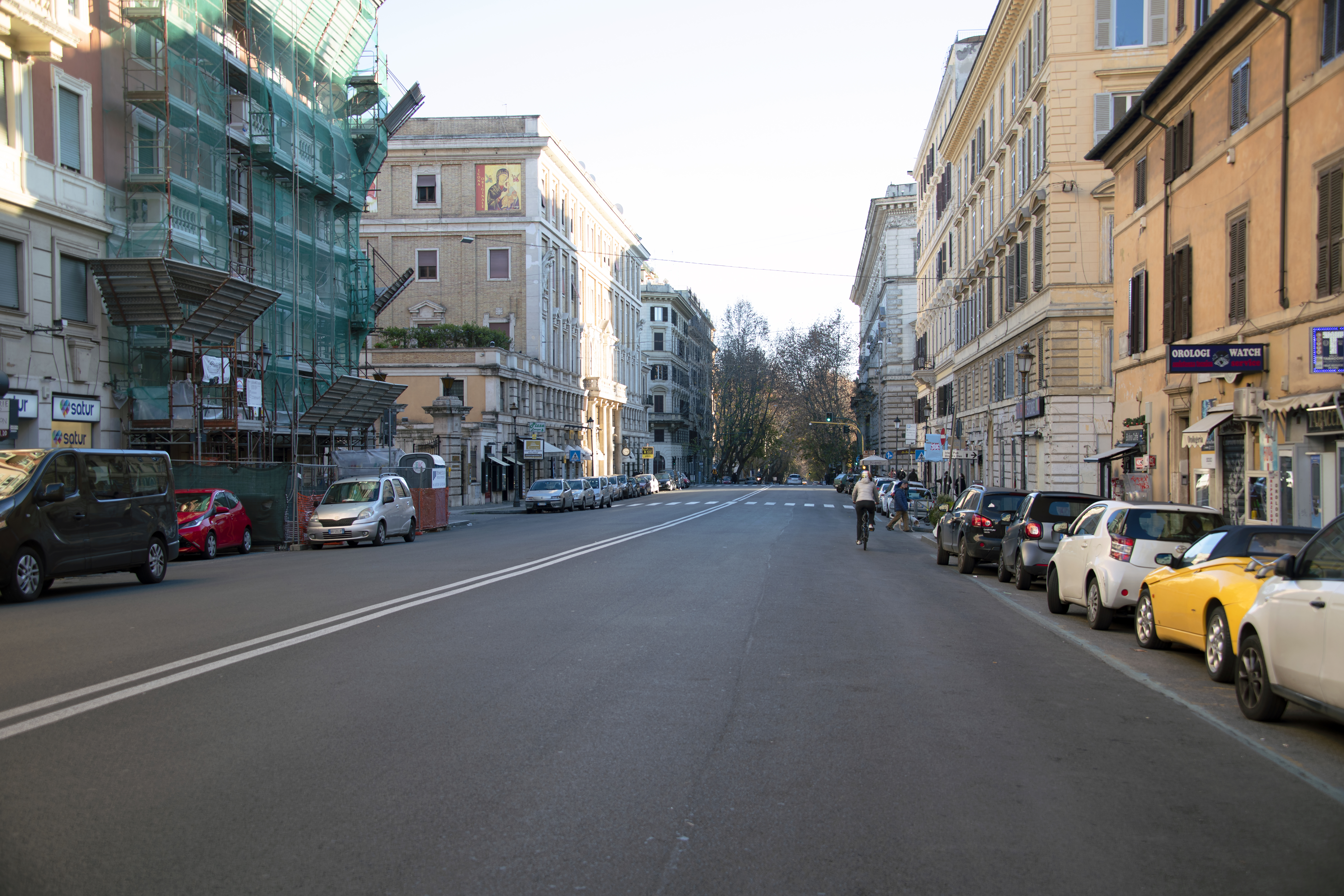
Via Merulana

Via Merulana is a street in the Rione Monti of Rome, Italy. It is south of the main train station (Stazioni Termini) of Rome, near the Oppian Hill. The street connects two major papal basilicas: the Santa Maria Maggiore to the St John Lateran. The name derives from family that owned the land during the medieval period. The present street was initiated by Pope Gregory XIII in the late 16th century and finished not long after by Pope Sixtus V.

On the route described above are the facades of the church of Sant'Antonio da Padova and the adjacent Franciscan convent. Previously the site was occupied by the Villa Giustiniani Massimo. At the intersection with the Roman Via Labicana is the facade of the ancient church of Santi Marcellino e Pietro al Laterano. On the intersection with via di San Vito is the church of Sant'Alfonso di Liguori all'Esquilino of the Order of the Redemptorist Priests. Instead, on the intersection with via Mecenate is the Auditorium of Maecenas, a nymphaeum part of the Gardens of Maecenas. Other institutions on the route include the Museo Nazionale d'Arte Orientale and the Pontifical University Antonianum. The ancient church of San Matteo in Via Merulana was destroyed in 1810.

The street is included in the crime novel That Awful Mess on Via Merulana by the Italian writer Carlo Emilio Gadda. The street is also included in the novel ‘’The Curse of Pietro Houdini’’ by the writer Derek B. Miller

== See also ==
- Bust of Augustus with Gemmed Crown
