= Jean Jérôme Hamer =

Belgian Catholic cardinal

His Eminence Jean Jérôme Hamer O.P.
- Prefect Emeritus of the Congregation for Institutes of Consecrated Life and Societies of Apostolic Life
- Church: Roman Catholic Church
- Appointed: 27 May 1985
- Term ended: 21 January 1992
- Predecessor: Eduardo Francisco Pironio
- Successor: Eduardo Martínez Somalo
- Other post: Cardinal-Priest of San Saba "pro hac vice" (1985–96) (Note: Held this church as a diaconate since 1985 and opted to become a Cardinal-Priest months before his death.)
- Previous posts: Adjunct Secretary of the Secretariat for Christian Unity (1966–69); Secretary of the Secretariat for Christian Unity (1969–73); Secretary of the Congregation for the Doctrine of the Faith (1973–84); Titular Archbishop of Lorium (1973–85); Pro-Prefect of the Congregation for the Religious and Secular Institutes (1984–85)

Orders
- Ordination: 3 August 1941
- Consecration: 29 June 1973 by Pope Paul VI
- Created cardinal: 25 May 1985 by Pope John Paul II
- Rank: Cardinal-Deacon (1985–96); Cardinal-Priest (1996)

Personal details
- Born: Jean Jérôme Hamer; 1 June 1916 Brussels, Belgium
- Died: 2 December 1996 (aged 80) Rome, Italy
- Education: University of Fribourg
- Motto: Fideliter et constanter

Styles of Jean Jérôme Hamer
- Reference style: His Eminence
- Spoken style: Your Eminence
- Informal style: Cardinal
- See: Lorium (titular see)

Jean Jérôme Hamer, O.P., S.T.D. (1 June 1916 – 2 December 1996) was a Belgian Cardinal who was Prefect of the Congregation for Institutes of Consecrated Life and Societies of Apostolic Life from 1985 until 1992.

== Biography ==
He was born in Brussels and joined the Dominican Order in 1934 taking the name of Jérôme. He received his religious training at La Sarte, a Dominican Study house near Huy (Belgium), and Louvain University. He did his military service and, during the Second World War, spent 3 months of 1940 as a prisoner. He was ordained on 3 August 1941. He continued his studies at the University of Fribourg, Switzerland, where he earned his doctorate in theology. He was on the teaching staff of the Pontificium Athenaeum Internationale Angelicum for the academic year of 1952–53. He had been a staff member at the University of Fribourg since 1944, where he then returned and taught until 1962.

== Episcopate ==
He was appointed secretary of the party in 1958 Secretariat for Promoting Christian Unity on 12 April 1969. Then, on 14 June 1973, he was appointed titular archbishop of Lorium and secretary of the Congregation for the Doctrine of the Faith.

He was consecrated on 29 June 1973 by Pope Paul VI. In 1974, the Congregation published a "declaration on procured abortion", re-asserting the Church's opposition to the controversial procedure since the publication of Humanae Vitae. He later helped in writing the document Persona humana on the topic of sexual ethics.

He remained at this position until Pope John Paul II appointed him Pro-Prefect of the Congregation for Institutes of Consecrated Life and Societies of Apostolic Life in 1984. At that time the title of Prefect was reserved for someone who was already a Cardinal.

== Cardinalate ==
He became Prefect of the Congregation when he was made Cardinal-Deacon of San Saba in the consistory of 25 May 1985, two days after which the full title was formally granted him. He resigned as the head of the Congregation on 21 January 1992. He opted for the order of Cardinal Priests after ten years and his deaconry was elevated pro hac vice to title on 29 January 1996. He lost the right to participate in a conclave when he turned 80 in 1996. He died on 2 December 1996 in Rome.

== Bibliography ==
- The Church Is A Communion. New York: Sheed and Ward, 1964.
- Karl Barth. Westminster, Md.: Newman Press, 1962.
- Karl Barth : l'occasionalisme théologique de Karl Barth : étude sur sa méthode dogmatique. Paris: Desclée de Brouwer, 1949.

Catholic Church titles
Preceded by Paul-Pierre Philippe	Secretary of the Congregation for the Doctrine of the Faith; 14 June 1973 – 8 April 1984	Succeeded by Alberto Bovone
Preceded by Eduardo Francisco Pironio	Prefect of the Congregation for Institutes of Consecrated Life and Societies of Apostolic Life; 27 May 1985 – 21 January 1992	Succeeded by Eduardo Martínez Somalo
