= San Saba (rione of Rome) =

Coordinates: 41°52′44″N 12°29′11″E

- Rione of Rome
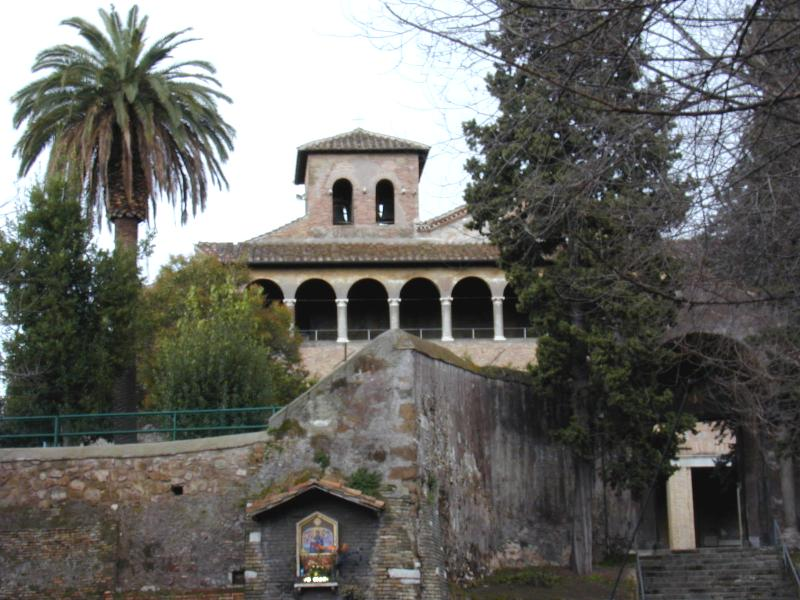
- The church of San Saba

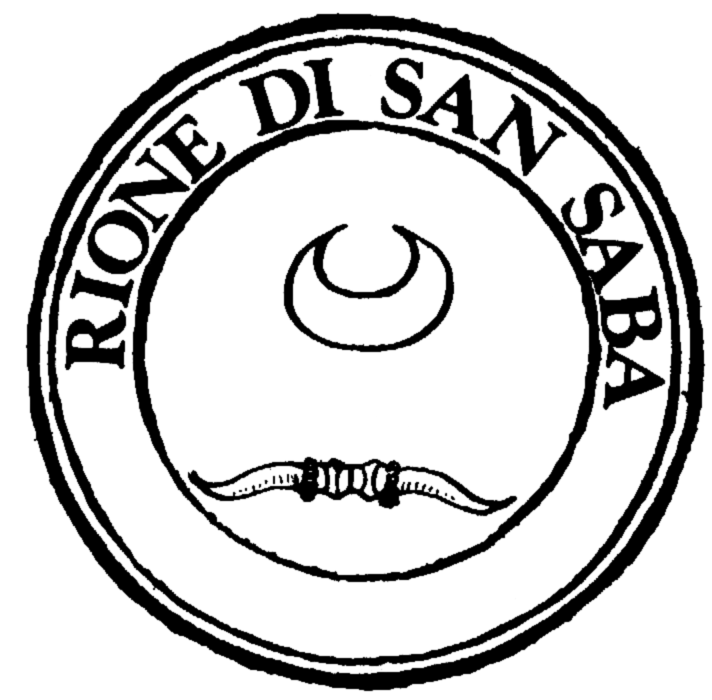
- Seal

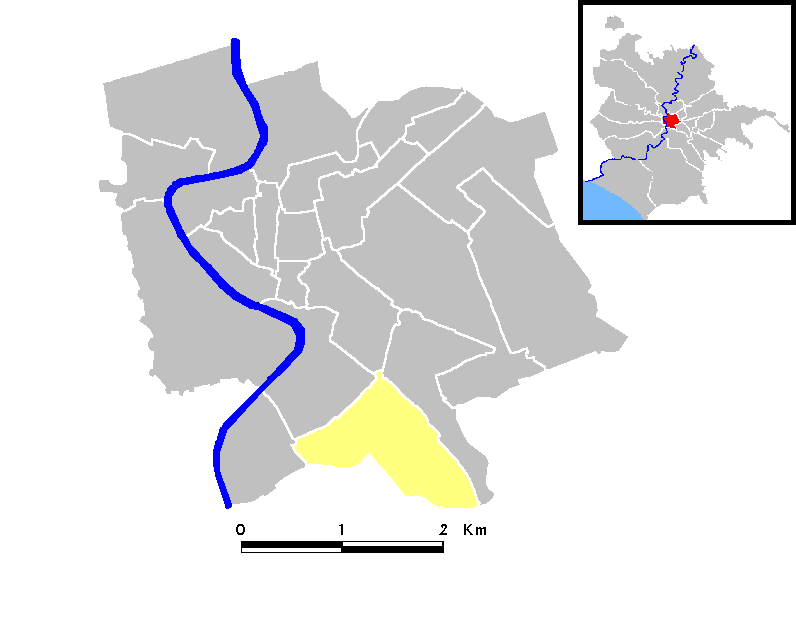
- Position of the rione within the center of the city
- Country: Italy
- Region: Lazio
- Province: Rome
- Comune: Rome
- Time zone: UTC+1 (CET)
  - Summer (DST): UTC+2 (CEST)

San Saba is the 21st rione of Rome, Italy, identified by the initials R. XXI. It is located within the Municipio I, and takes its name from the Basilica of San Saba, which is located there.

== History ==
The church of San Saba and the attached monastery, which after the fall of the Roman Empire have been for centuries the only populated settlement in the area, were built by some hermits between 7th and 9th century. The monastery soon became a powerful and lively institution, with many properties and an advanced diplomatic activity that made it influential in Constantinople and among the barbarians.

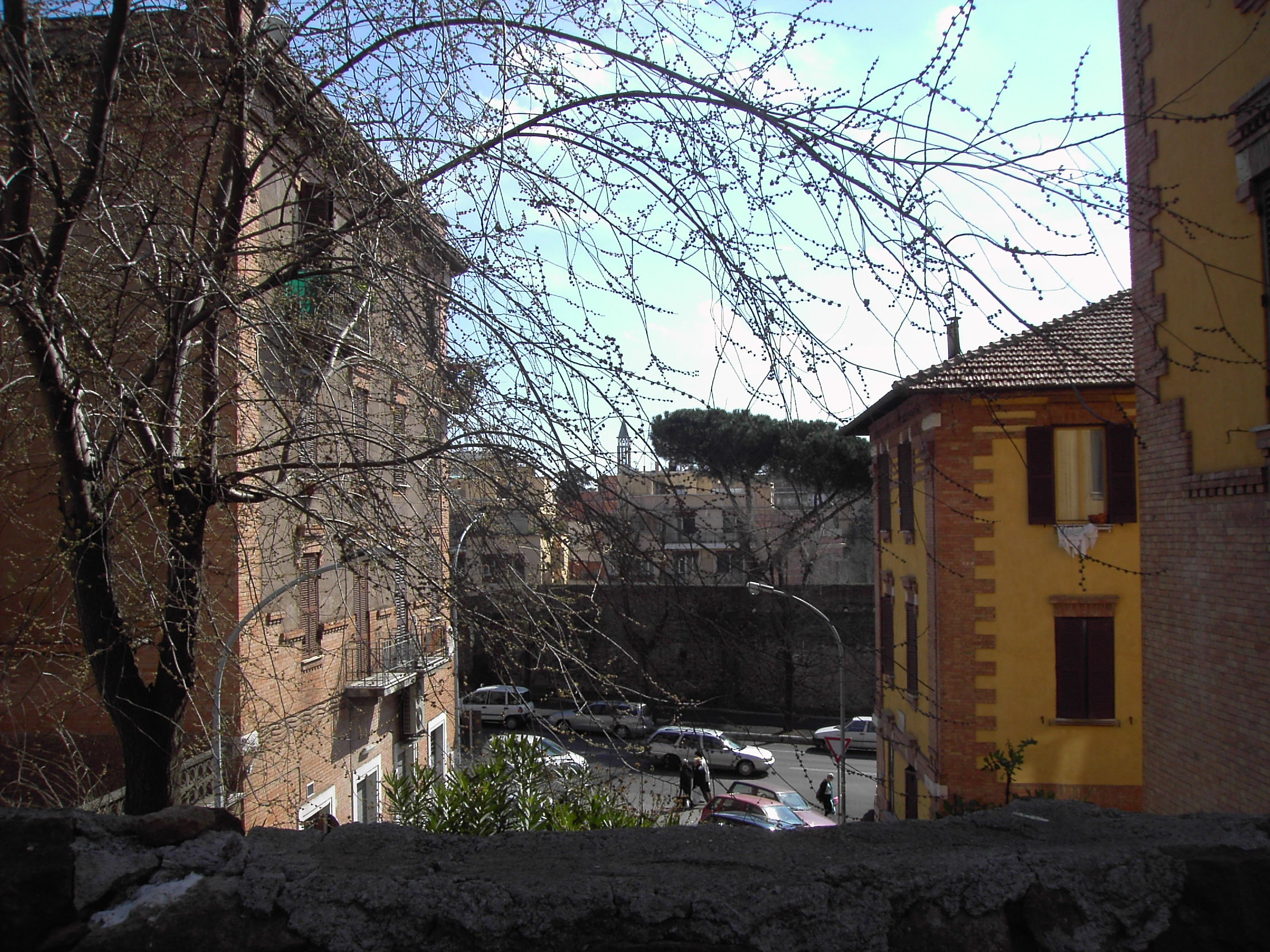
A view of some ICP houses

At the beginning of 20th century the church and the monastery were still surrounded by the countryside, and the 1909 town plan led to the urbanization of the area. Between 1907 and 1914 the Municipality commissioned the construction of a public housing complex for the clerical middle class, between the church and the Aurelian Walls to the Istituto Case Popolari. The planning was entrusted to the young architect Quadrio Pirani and the wide, tree-lined roads were named after prominent architects and artists. The public houses are semi-detached houses and little apartment blocks, with no more than 4 floors, each covered with bricks whose color evokes the ancient walls of the monastery.

Positioned on the level top of the Aventine Hill, the rione is crossed by rises and steps declining to the walls or to Testaccio.

== Geography ==
=== Boundaries ===
Northward, the rione borders with Ripa (R. XII), being delimited by Largo Manlio Gelsomini, Via Manlio Gelsomini, Piazza Albania, Viale Aventino and Piazza di Porta Capena.

Eastward, San Saba is separated from Celio (R. XIX) by Piazza di Porta Capena, Via Valle delle Camene, Viale delle Terme di Caracalla, Piazzale Numa Pompilio and Via di Porta San Sebastiano.

To the south, San Saba borders with quartieri Ardeatino (Q. XX) and Ostiense (Q. X): the boundary is marked by the Aurelian Walls, beside Viale di Porta Ardeatina, and by Piazzale Ostiense.

Westward, the rione is separated from Testaccio (R. XX) by the portion of Via Marmorata between Piazzale Ostiense and Largo Manlio Gelsomini.

=== Odonymy ===
The rione revolves around a principal square Piazza Gian Lorenzo Bernini, which gathers all the elements that characterise an autonomous village, e.g. the elementary school, named after Leopoldo Franchetti, a park, a recreation ground and the nearby church, the market, several stores and a little theatre.

One of the main roads of San Saba is Viale Guido Baccelli, passing through the archaeological zone: it was named after the great physician and politician because of his dedication to the promotion of the archaeological area.

Other roads and squares are mostly named after artists and architects. Street names of the rione can be categorised as follows:

- Local names, such as Via di San Saba, Via di Villa Pepoli and Viale Aventino;
- Names that recall Roman antiquity, e.g. Piazza Remuria, Via Antonina, Via Antoniniana (both named after Antoninus Caracalla), Via Annia Faustina, Via Lucio Fabio Cilone, Via delle Terme di Caracalla;
- Artists and architects, e.g. Leon Battista Alberti, Francesco Borromini, Bramante, Giacomo Della Porta, Giotto, Pirro Ligorio, Carlo Maderno, Andrea Palladio, Baldassarre Peruzzi, Bartolomeo Pinelli, Giovanni Battista Piranesi, Baccio Pontelli, Flaminio Ponzio, Ercole Rosa, Federico Zuccari;
- Fallen in the Battle for Rome in 1943, e.g. Largo Bruno Baldinotti and Largo Enzo Fioritto.

== Places of interest ==
=== Palaces and other buildings ===
- FAO Headquarters, in Viale delle Terme di Caracalla

=== Archaeological sites ===
- Baths of Caracalla

=== Churches ===
- San Saba
- Santa Balbina
- Santi Nereo e Achilleo
- San Cesareo de Appia
