= Monti (rione of Rome) =

Coordinates: 41°53′42″N 12°29′21″E

- Rione of Rome
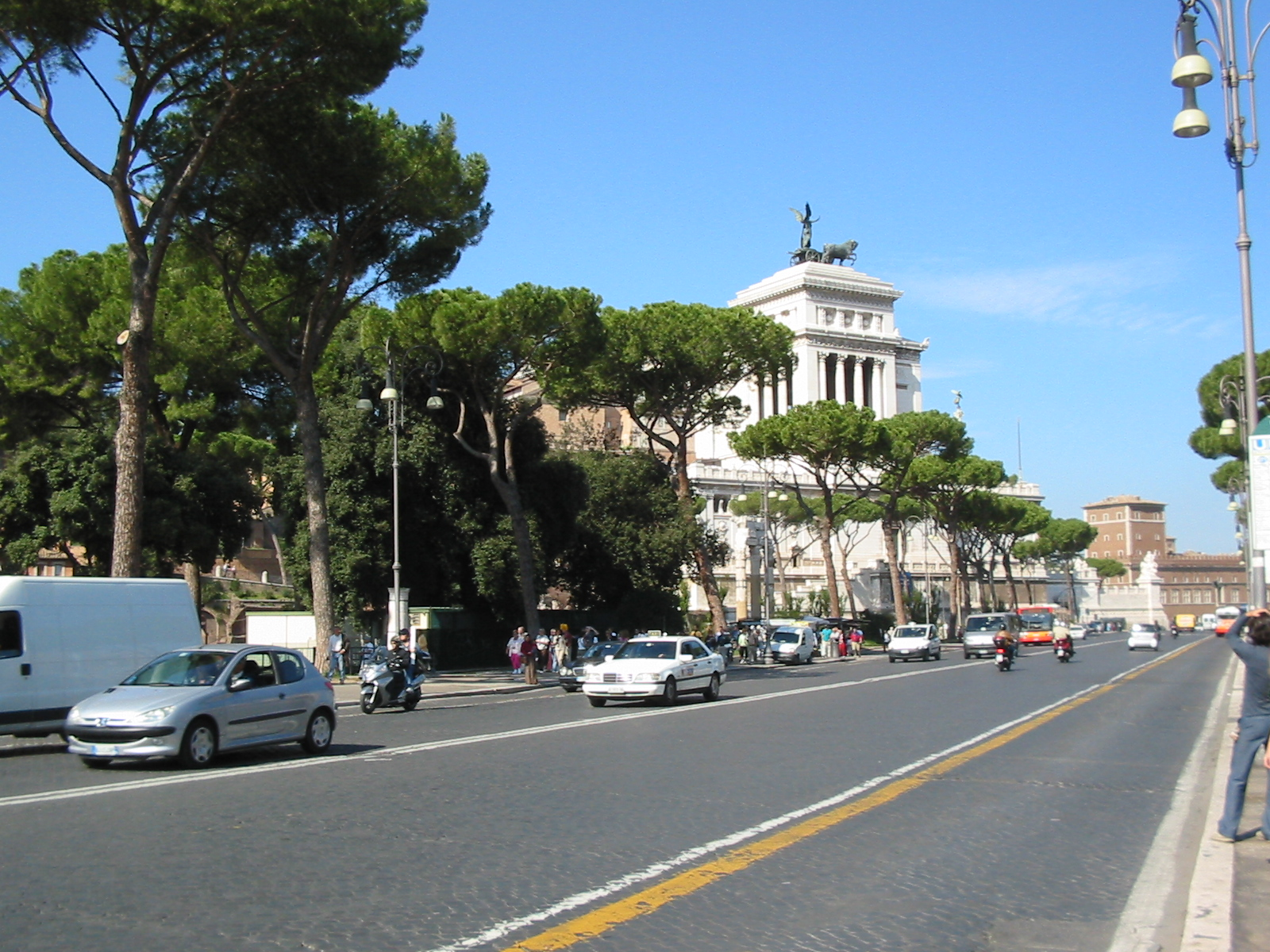
- Via dei Fori Imperiali

- Seal

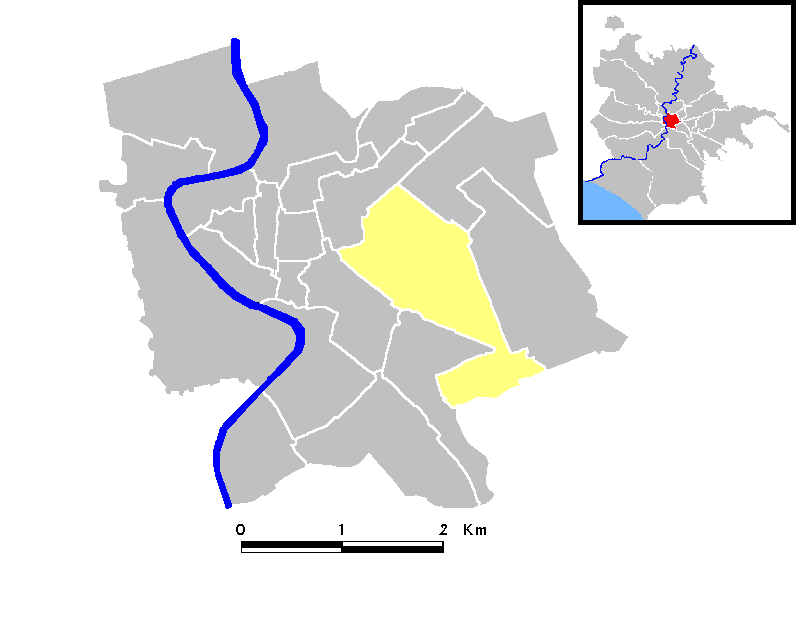
- Position of the rione within the center of the city
- Country: Italy
- Region: Lazio
- Province: Rome
- Comune: Rome
- Demonym: Monticiani
- Time zone: UTC+1 (CET)
  - Summer (DST): UTC+2 (CEST)

Monti is the 1st rione of Rome, Italy, identified by the initials R. I, located in Municipio I. The name literally means 'mountains' in Italian and comes from the fact that the Esquiline, the Viminal Hills, and parts of the Quirinal and the Caelian Hills belonged to this rione: currently, however, the Esquiline Hill belongs to the rione Esquilino.

The coat of arms consists of three green mountains with three tops on a silver background.

== History ==
In ancient times, the rione was densely populated; Monti was home to the Forum Romanum and the so-called Suburra, where poor people lived, full of disreputable locals and brothels.

In the Middle Ages the situation was completely different: the Roman aqueducts were damaged, and it was very difficult to bring water to Monti since it was on the hills. Hence many inhabitants moved to Campus Martius, a lower level part, where they could drink the water from the river Tiber.

From the Middle Ages to the beginning of the 19th century, the rione remained an area full of vineyards and vegetable gardens. Monti was not densely populated because of the lack of water and because it was quite far from the Vatican, the center of Christian culture. The area did not become abandoned thanks to the church of San Giovanni in Laterano and the constant high number of pilgrims.

Still in the Middle Ages the inhabitants of Monti, called monticiani, developed a strong identity: their Roman dialect was different from that spoken in the other rioni. Their main enemies were the people from the other rione with a strong identity, Trastevere, and they often used to fight with one another.

Then, with growing urbanization at the end of the 19th century after Rome had become the capital of a united Italy, the great changes of the Fascist period completely changed the appearance of the rione. In particular, between 1924 and 1936, a large part of the rione, consisting of small streets and popular houses, was destroyed to make way for the Via dei Fori Imperiali (the street artificially dividing the Roman Forum and most of the Imperial forums) and the archaeological buildings of the Forum Romanum were excavated.

Thanks to its position, Monti is full of archaeological sites such as:

- Colosseum
- Ludus Magnus (the gym for gladiators)
- Nero's Domus Aurea
- the Baths of Trajan
- the Baths of Titus
- part of the Forum Romanum
- Markets of Trajan

== Geography ==
=== Boundaries ===
To the north, the rione borders with Trevi (R. II), from which it is separated by the Foro Traiano, Via IV Novembre, Largo Magnanapoli, Via XXIV Maggio and Via del Quirinale; and with Castro Pretorio (R. XVIII), the boundary being defined by Via delle Quattro Fontane, Via Agostino Depretis, Piazza dell'Esquilino and Via dell'Esquilino.

To the east, the rione borders with Esquilino (R. XV): the boundary is marked by Piazza di Santa Maria Maggiore, Via Merulana, Piazza di San Giovanni in Laterano and Piazza di Porta San Giovanni.

To the south, it is separated from Quartiere Appio-Latino (Q. IX) by the stretch of the Aurelian Walls between Porta San Giovanni and Porta Metronia.

To the west, Monti borders with Celio (R. XIX), whose boundary is marked by Piazza di Porta Metronia, Via della Navicella, Via di Santo Stefano Rotondo, Via di San Giovanni in Laterano and Piazza del Colosseo; it also borders with Campitelli (R. X), whose boundary is marked by Via dei Fori Imperiali.

== Places of interest ==
=== Palaces and other buildings ===
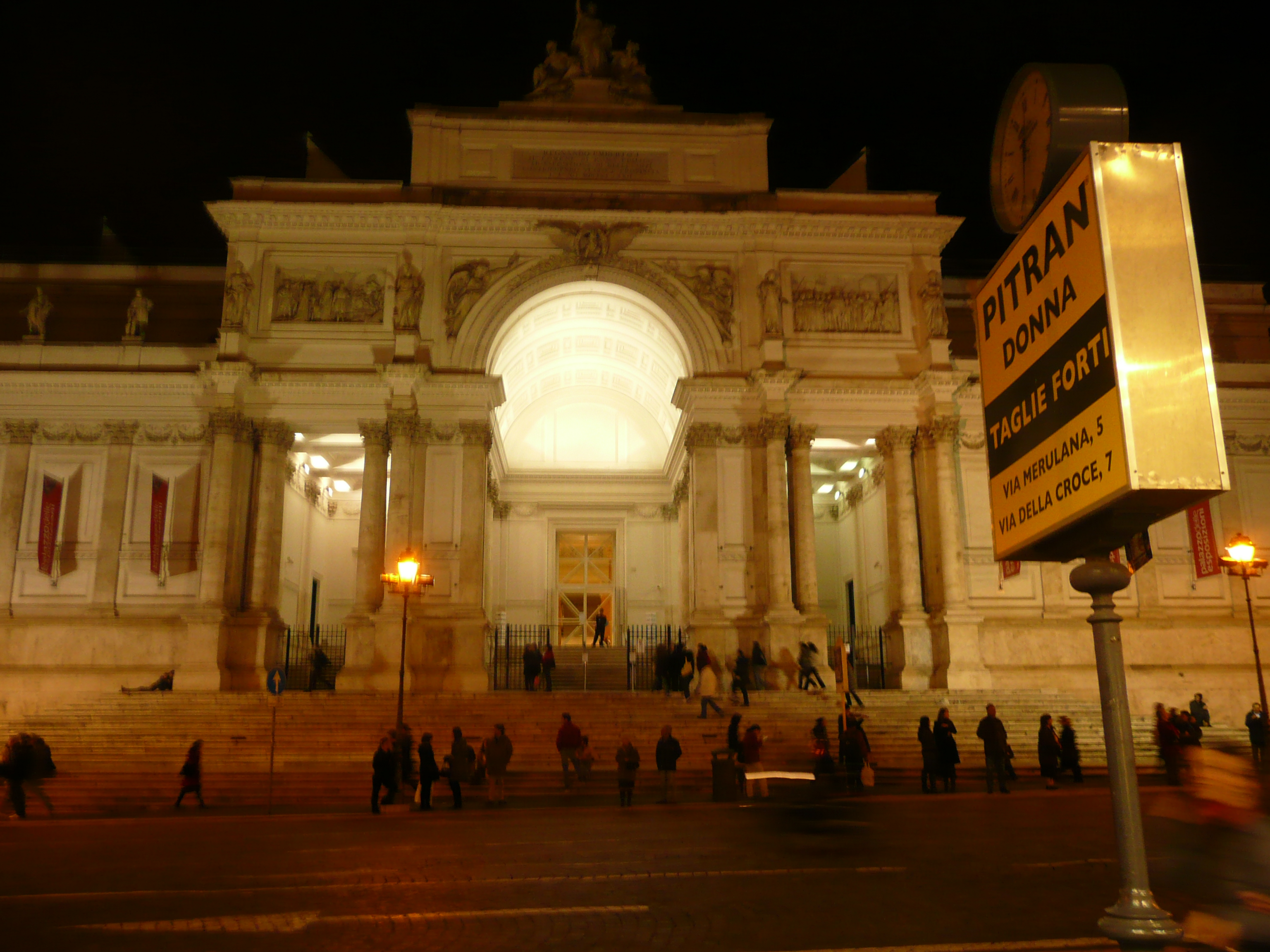
The Palazzo delle Esposizioni in Via Nazionale

- Casa dei Cavalieri di Rodi, in Via Campo Carleo.
- Palazzo Brancaccio, In Via Merulana.
- Palazzo della Consulta, in Piazza del Quirinale.
- Palazzo del Grillo, in Piazza del Grillo.
- Palazzo delle Esposizioni, in Via Nazionale.
- Palazzo Koch, seat of the Banca d'Italia, in Via Nazionale.
- Palazzo del Laterano, in Piazza di San Giovanni in Laterano.
- Palazzo Pallavicini-Rospigliosi, in Via XXIV Maggio.
- Palazzo del Viminale, in Piazza del Viminale.

=== Churches ===
- Sant'Agata dei Goti
- Sant'Andrea al Quirinale
- San Carlo alle Quattro Fontane
- San Clemente
- Santa Maria dei Monti
- Santa Maria Maggiore
- San Martino ai Monti
- Santa Prassede
- San Pietro in Vincoli
- Santa Pudenziana
- Santi Quirico e Giulitta
- Santi Domenico e Sisto
- Santo Stefano Rotondo
- San Vitale
- San Giovanni in Laterano
- Santi Marcellino e Pietro
- Santa Lucia in Selci

=== Archaeological sites ===
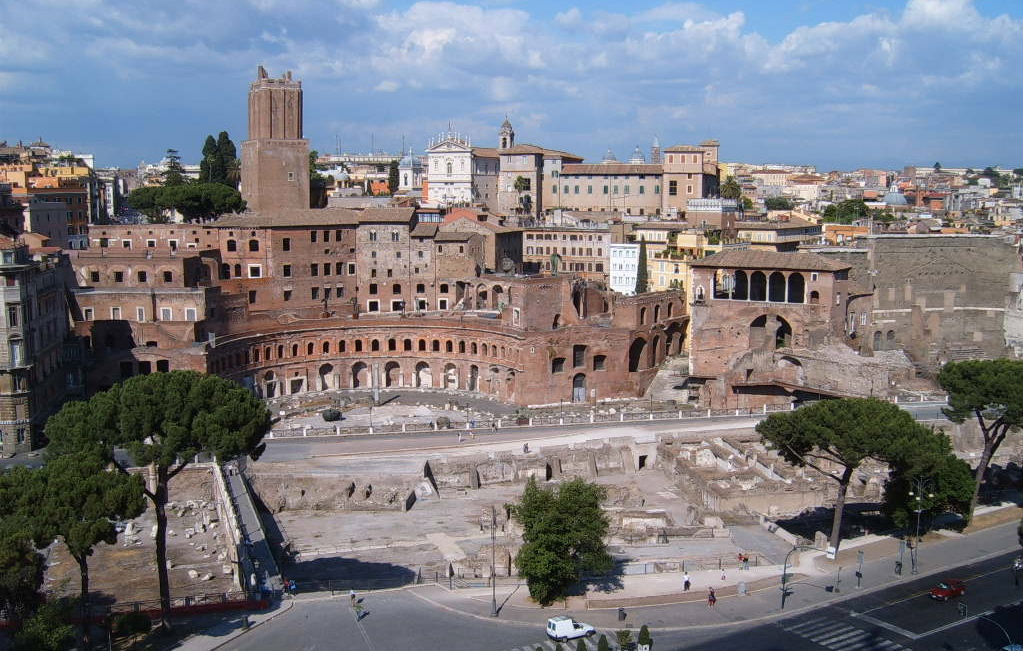
The Trajan's Forum and the Trajan's Market

- Forum of Augustus
- Forum of Caesar
- Forum of Nerva
- Trajan's Forum
- Trajan's Market
- Domus Aurea
- Baths of Trajan
- Baths of Titus
- Ludus Magnus

=== Education ===
The biblioteca federata Scaffale d'arte Palaexpo is located in Monti.

The Pontifical University of Saint Thomas Aquinas, Angelicum is located in Monti.
