= Mario Ridolfi =

- Born: 5 May 1904; Rome, Kingdom of Italy
- Died: 11 November 1984 (aged 80); Terni, Umbria, Italy
- Occupations: Architect, urban planner

Mario Ridolfi (5 May 1904 – 11 November 1984) was an Italian architect and urban planner associated with Italian rationalism and later with Neorealist architecture. He was one of the leading architects involved in the INA-Casa public housing programme after World War II, designing the Tiburtino district in Rome together with Ludovico Quaroni. He also contributed to the Manuale dell'architetto (Architect's Manual), published in 1945–46.

Among Ridolfi's best-known works are the Nomentano Post Office, the FAO Headquarters and the INA Towers in Rome, and several residential buildings in Terni. In 1953 he was awarded the Feltrinelli Prize by the Accademia Nazionale dei Lincei.

In the final years of his life, Ridolfi's health deteriorated significantly, with declining mobility and eyesight. Following the death of his son Fabio in Toronto in December 1982, he became increasingly withdrawn. He died by suicide in the Nera River near Terni on 11 November 1984.

== Sources ==
- Bellini, Federico. Gli architetti: Mario Ridolfi. Laterza.
- Moschini, Francesco; Rattazzi, Luciana, eds. (1997). Mario Ridolfi, la poetica del dettaglio. Rome: Edizioni Kappa / A.A.M. Architettura Arte Moderna.
