= Bust of Augustus with Gemmed Crown =

Ancient marble statue

- Ritratto di Augusto
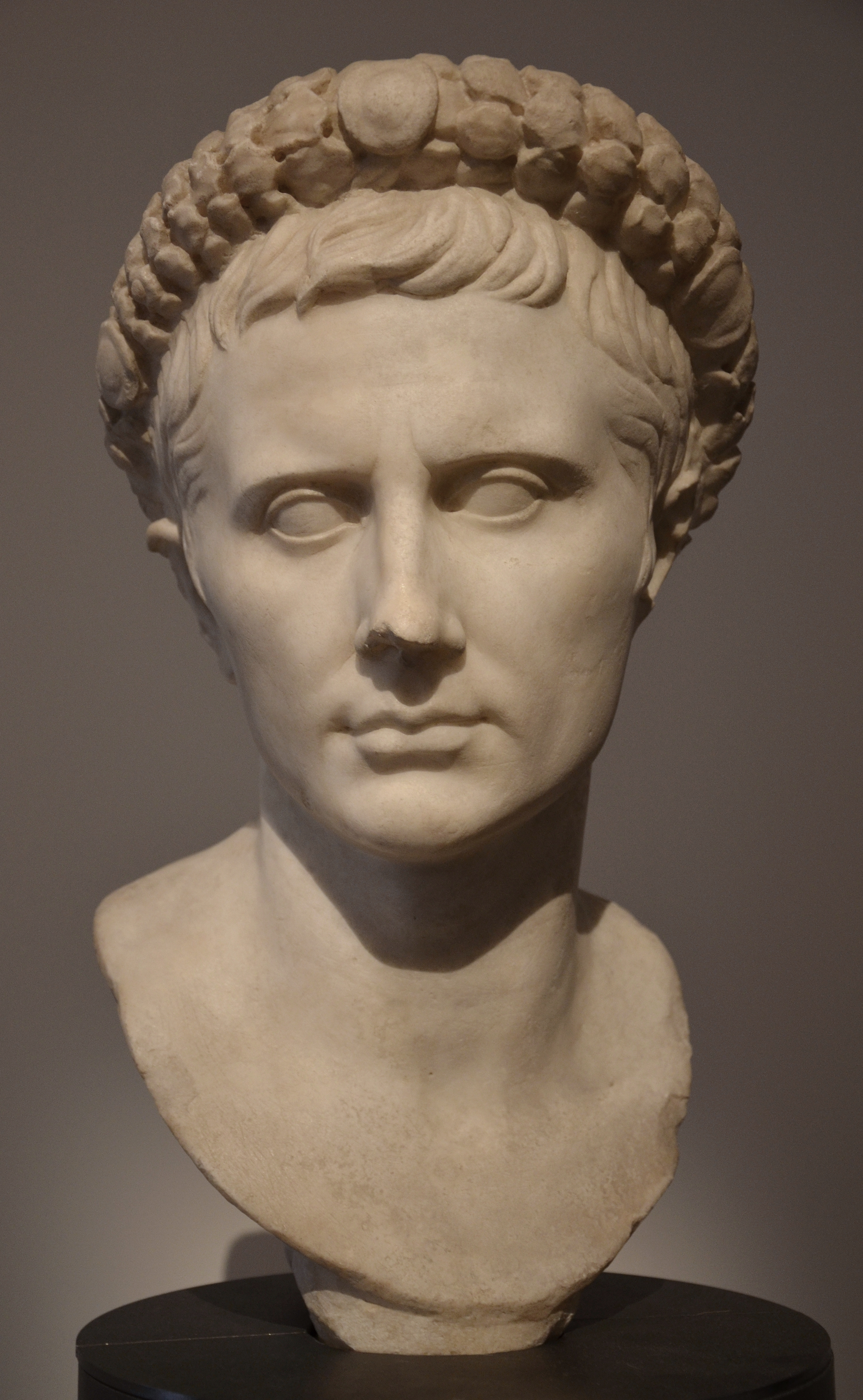
- Type: bust
- Material: marble
- Height: 43 cm
- Created: 27 BC – 14 AD
- Period/culture: Julio-Claudian Dynasty
- Discovered: 1889; Via Merulana, Rome
- Present location: Capitoline Museum
- Classification: Roman sculpture
- Identification: inv. MC0495
- Culture: Roman Empire

The Bust of Augustus with Gemmed Crown is a Roman Bust depicting the first emperor of the Roman Empire, Augustus.

Discovered in 1889, it is currently displayed at the Capitoline Museums, at the Capitoline Hill, in Rome, Italy. It is displayed in the Hall of the Emperors, first established in 1733 by Pope Clement XII, which features a gallery of imperial portraits of Roman emperors displayed in chronological order. It is designated as accession number inv. MC0495.

== Discovery ==
The bust was first discovered in the 1889 excavations at the Via Merulana, near the Santi Marcellino e Pietro al Laterano which served as filler for a medieval period wall. It was subsequently identified by Carlo Ludovico Visconti.

== Description ==
The crown of Augustus was considered a type of civic crown, commonly consisting of oak leaves, and is a classified as a military decoration given to Romans who save the lives of Roman citizens during warfare. Though subsequent analysis of the wreath indicates that the crown could be that of myrtle leaves or laurel, more indicative of triumphal crowns made to commemorate his victory at the Battle of Actium.

Augustus is portrayed at the height of his glory, with a calm expression, and head slightly tilted to the right with closed lips. It is done similar to the Augustus of Prima Porta, also held in the Capitoline's collection. A bust of a similar style is present in the collection of the Museum of Fine Arts, Boston, with a characteristic style called the "Forbes type", which maintains a motif of comma-shaped locks brushed to one side of the forehead. These sculptures are classified by classical archaeologist Dietrich Boschung as a "third chronological type" of the emperor.

== Exhibition ==
The sculpture has been exhibited abroad at:

- Auguste, Scuderie del Quirinale, Rome, 18 October 2013 - 9 February 2014
- Moi Auguste, Empereuer de Rome, Grand Palais, Paris, 17 March - 13 July 2014
- Claude, un Empereur au destin singulier, Museum of Fine Arts of Lyon, Lyon, December 2018 - March 2019
- Roma, the Eternal City, Masterpieces from the Capitoline Museums' Collection, Tokyo Metropolitan Art Museum, Ueno, Tokyo, 16 September - 10 December 2023
