= San Saba, Rome =

Basilica of San Saba
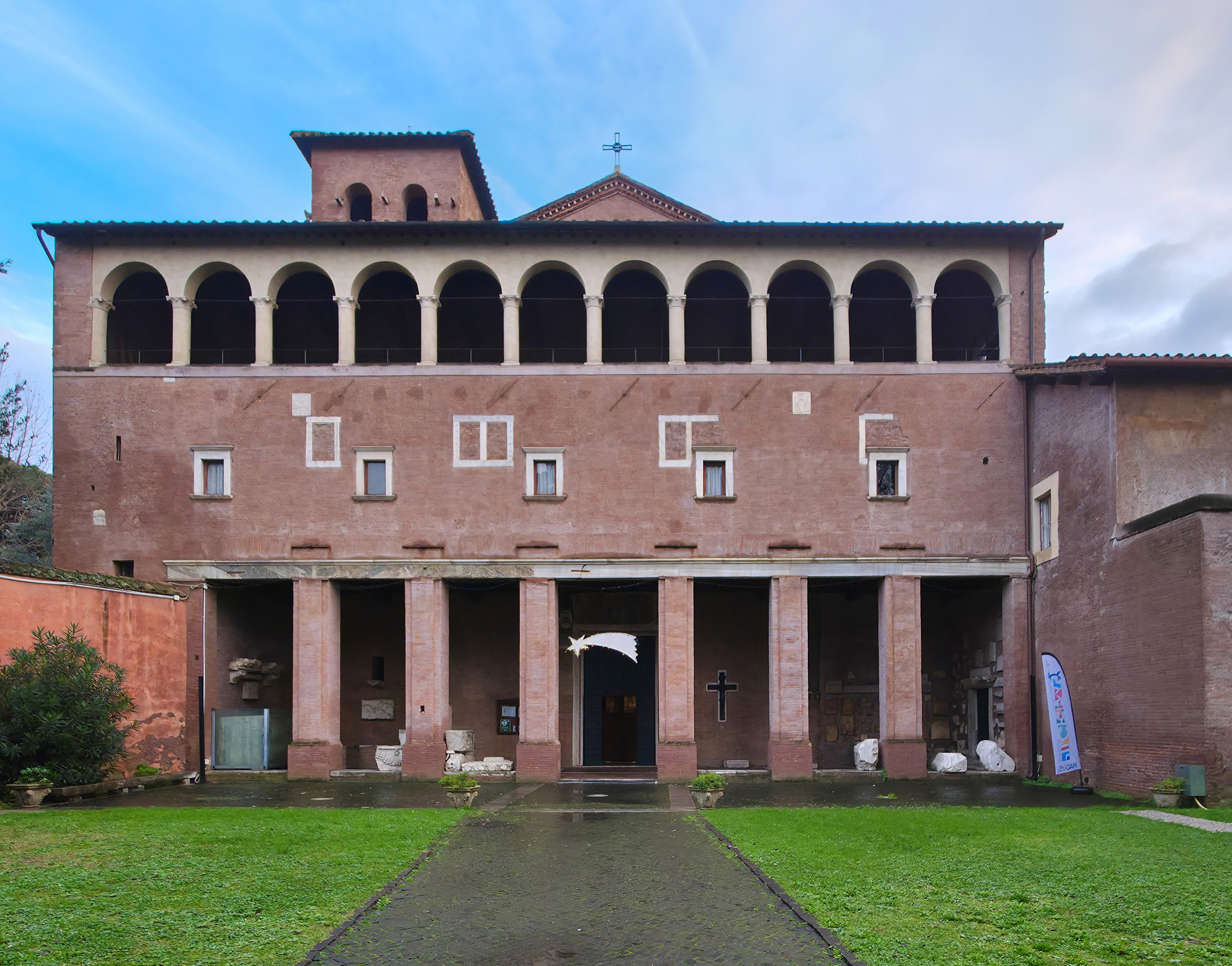
- Façade
- Click on the map for a fullscreen view
- 41°52′43″N 12°29′08″E
- Location: Piazza Gian Lorenzo Bernini 20; Rome
- Country: Italy
- Denomination: Catholic
- Religious institute: Jesuits
- Website: www.parrocchiasansaba.it

History
- Status: Minor basilica, titular church
- Dedication: Sabbas the Sanctified

Architecture
- Style: Romanesque
- Completed: 13th century

San Saba is an ancient basilica church in Rome, Italy. It lies on the so-called Lesser Aventine (Latin Aventinus Minor), which is an area close to the ancient Aurelian Walls next to the Aventine Hill and Caelian Hill.

The current Cardinal Deacon of the Titulus S. Sabae is Arthur Roche, succeeding Jorge Medina. Both served as prefects of the Dicastery of Divine Worship and the Discipline of the Sacraments at the time of their elevation. The church was made parochial in 1931 and entrusted to the care of the Society of Jesus. It was established as a titulus in 1959. The church gives its name to the modern Roman rione ("district").

== History ==
According to legend, St. Silvia, mother of Pope Gregory I, had an estate at the site. After her death, so legend reads, her estate was transformed into an affiliate monastery of St. Andreas, the monastery which Gregory I founded at the site of today's San Gregorio al Celio. This legend, however, can be traced back only to the 12th century, when in the context of Renovatio Romae and Church Reform, the monastery of San Saba was meant to be provided with a long and impressive local tradition.

An alternate theory suggests a connection with a hospice for pilgrims founded by Gregory on land that belonged to his family.

The historic origin of the religious site goes back to around 645. In this year, fugitive monks from the monastery of St. Sabas (Mar Saba, Palestine), who had fled their home country after the Islamic invasion, came to Rome to attend the Lateran Council. After the council, these Sabaite monks settled down in an old domus (=noble estate) on the "Piccolo Aventino" (the smaller crest of the Aventine hill, which at this time was deserted due to the big decrease in Rome's population. Here, they founded an eremitic cell. The Sabaites introduced veneration of St. Sabas to Rome. In ancient sources, their monastery however goes by the name cellas novas or cellaenovae, which refers to the cellae (=cells) of their mother abbey, Mar Saba.

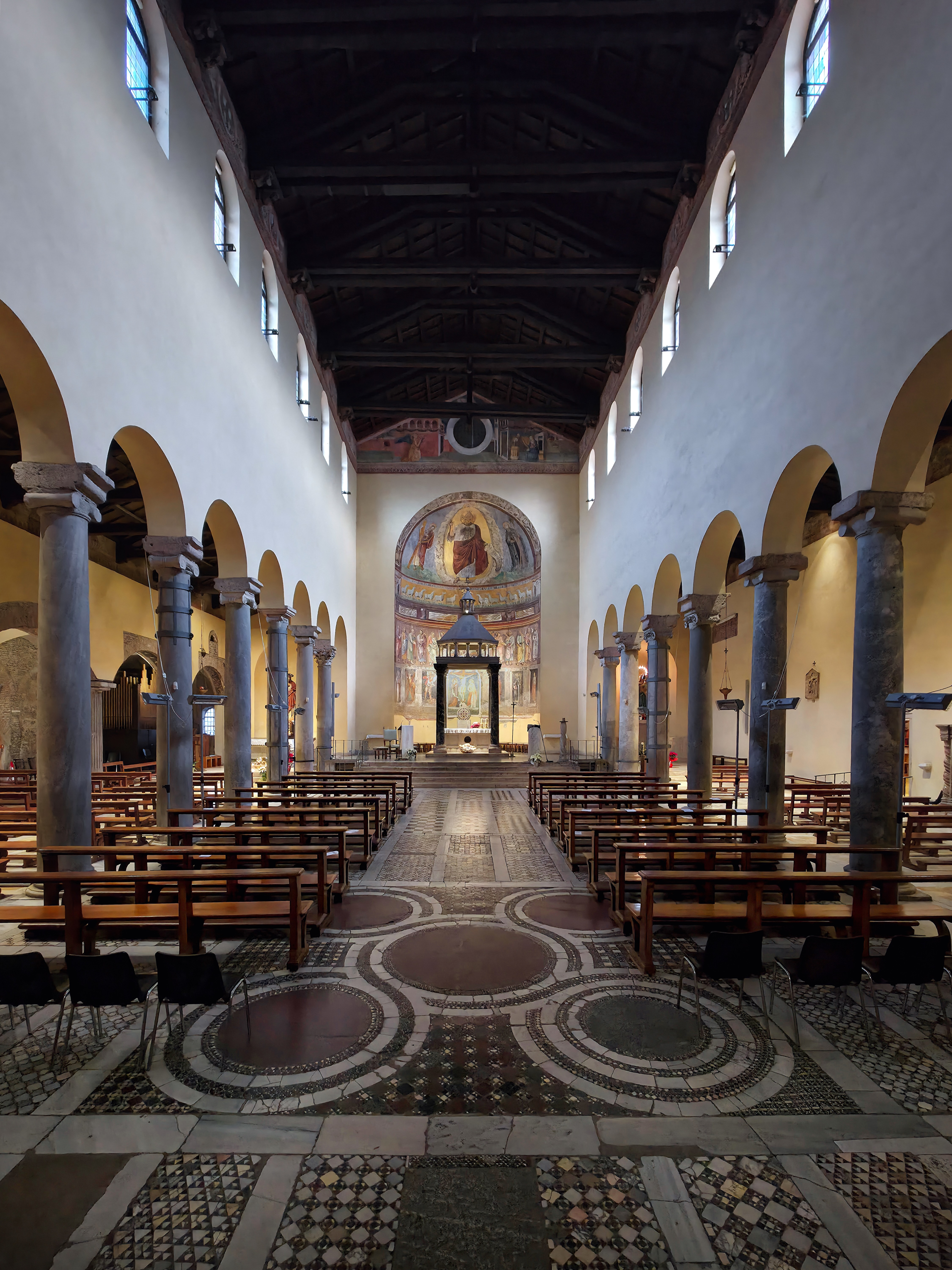
Nave

The Sabaite monastery prospered quickly and for a long time. In the 8th and 9th centuries, San Saba was one of the most prestigious of Rome and among the leading "Greek" monasteries. It received rich papal donations. Since 680, its abbots held important diplomatic roles in the relationships between Rome and Byzantium, and represented the Roman Church and Pope at several church councils in Constantinople.

In 768, Antipope Constantine II was held prisoner in this monastery, before being killed by the Lombards.

The Benedictine monks of Monte Cassino received the church after it was rebuilt in the 10th century. Anselm, the nephew of St Anselm, was one of its abbots before departing to England as a papal legate. After many years of decay, the basilica was completely renovated in the 13th century, after being ceded to Cluniac monks in 1144.

In 1463, Pope Pius II granted his nephew, Cardinal Francesco Todeschini the monastery of San Saba in commendam. The cardinal, who adopted his uncle's family name "Piccolomini", immediately began extensive restoration, construction, and decoration works on the ancient buildings. He added the loggia to the facade, and a fresco depicting the Annunciation.

In 1503 the Cistercians were entrusted with the church, which in 1573 was conveyed to the Jesuits (and their German seminary Collegium Germanicum et Hungaricum).

== Description ==
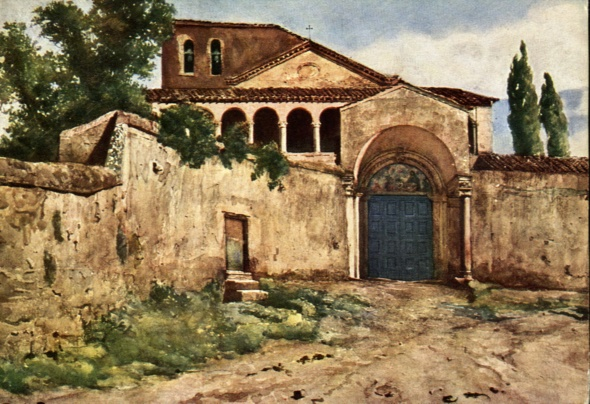
San Saba, Franz Roesler, c. 1880

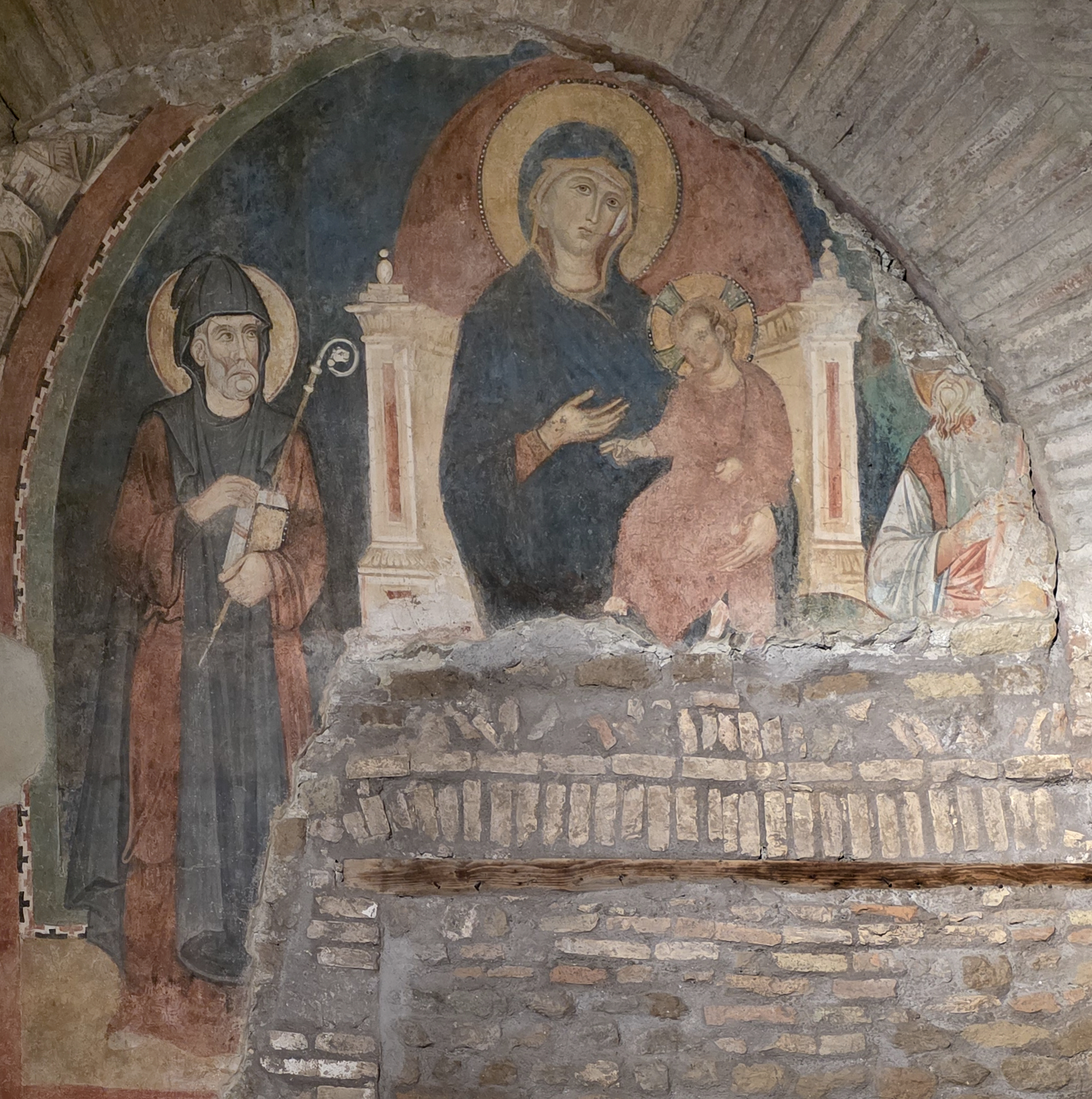
Fresco of the Madonna and Child

The church, preceded by a small porch from the 13th century, has a nave with two aisles. These end with three apses. The interior is characterized by numerous interventions from different ages. The columns are from ancient buildings, and the floor is an example of Cosmatesque marble art from the beginning of the 13th century.

The main artpieces are the notable frescoes that were discovered on the lower church which is close to the public. Fragments of those frescoes, most of which are very small, were detached and are now exhibited on the walls of the coridors leading to the church. On the left side of the lower church were depicted scenes from the life of Christ; on the right, scenes from the life of Mary. They represent the first instance of this Marian subject matter in any church in western Europe. The wall paintings were dated to the first half of the eighth century. Egyptian blue and lapis lazuli have been detected mixed together within the same pictorial layer. These are the oldest western paintings where lapis lazuli has been used as a blue pigment.

The crypt, built on the house of St. Silvia, holds the relics of St. Sabas. The sacristy houses a fragment of fresco from the first church (8th century).

== Cardinal-deacons ==
In 1959, San Saba was made a titular church, to be held by a cardinal-deacon.

- Augustin Bea (1959–1968)
- Jean Daniélou (1969–1974)
- Joseph Schröffer (1976–1983)
- Jean Jérôme Hamer (1985–1996)
- Jorge Medina (1998–2021)
- Arthur Roche (2022–present)

== Bibliography ==
- G. Bordi, Gli affreschi di San Saba sul piccolo Aventino: Dove e come erano (Milan, 2008).
- M. E. Cannizzaro, "L'antica chiesa di S. Saba sull'Aventino", in Atti del II Congresso Internazionale di Archeologia Cristiana, tenuto in Roma nell'aprile 1900 (Rome, 1902), pp. 241–248.
- M. E. Cannizzaro, "L'oratorio primitivo di S. Saba", in Atti del Congresso Internazionale di Scienze Storiche (Roma, 1–9 aprile 1903), vol. VII: Atti della sezione IV: Storia dell'Arte (Rome, 1905), pp. 177–192.
- Daniela Gallavotti Cavallero, S. Saba (Rome; Ist. Nazionale di Studi Romani, 1988).
- Richard Krautheimer, Corpus Basilicarum Christianarum Romae: The Early Christian Basilicas of Rome (IV-IX Cent.) Part IV (Rome: Pontificio istituto di archeologia cristiana, 1937), pp. 51 ff.

Preceded by Santi Quattro Coronati	Landmarks of Rome; San Saba, Rome	Succeeded by Santa Sabina
