= Piazza Albania =

Square in Rome

- City square
- {{{other_names}}}
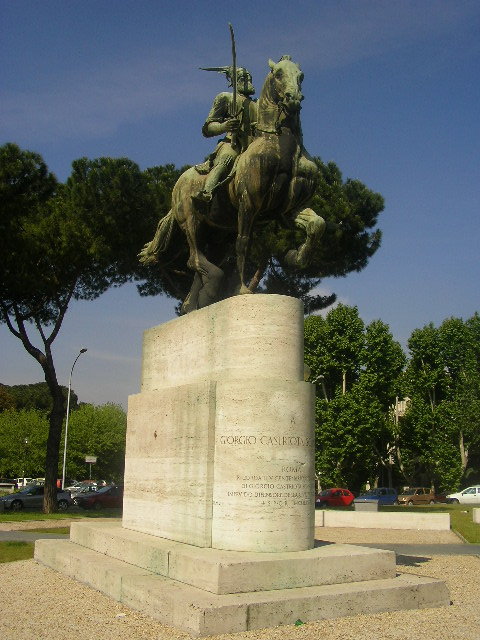
- Piazza Albania, Rome: the statue of George Kastrioti Skanderbeg, national hero of Albania
- Location: Rome, Italy
- Interactive map of Piazza Albania
- Coordinates: 41°52′49″N 12°29′01″E

Piazza Albania is a square of Rome (Italy), placed along Viale Aventino, not far from Porta San Paolo, at the footsteps of the Aventine Hill.

== History ==
The square was conceived together with the urban development plan of 1883, that, amongst other things, provided for the urbanization of the whole Aventine Hill, the enlargement of the urbanization in Testaccio towards Via Marmorata, and of San Saba. It was a district that, since then, had been left substantially rural and little inhabited: this allowed to trace the almost straight paths of the present Viale Aventino and Via della Piramide Cestia.

The square was initially called Piazza Raudusculana, as it is placed where the former Porta Raudusculana (no more existing) rose; it changed its name on July 4, 1940 and became Piazza Albania to commemorate the annexation of Albania to the Kingdom of Italy, that had taken place the previous year.

The square lies at the vertex of a vast green triangle (now called Parco della Resistenza dell'8 Settembre) and is surrounded by buildings erected between the 1930s and the 1960s. In the middle stands out the equestrian monument to George Kastrioti Skanderbeg, the 15th-century national hero of Albania, by the sculptor Romano Romanelli.
