= Porta Capena =

Gate in the Servian Wall in Rome, Italy

Coordinates: 41.884°N 12.491°E

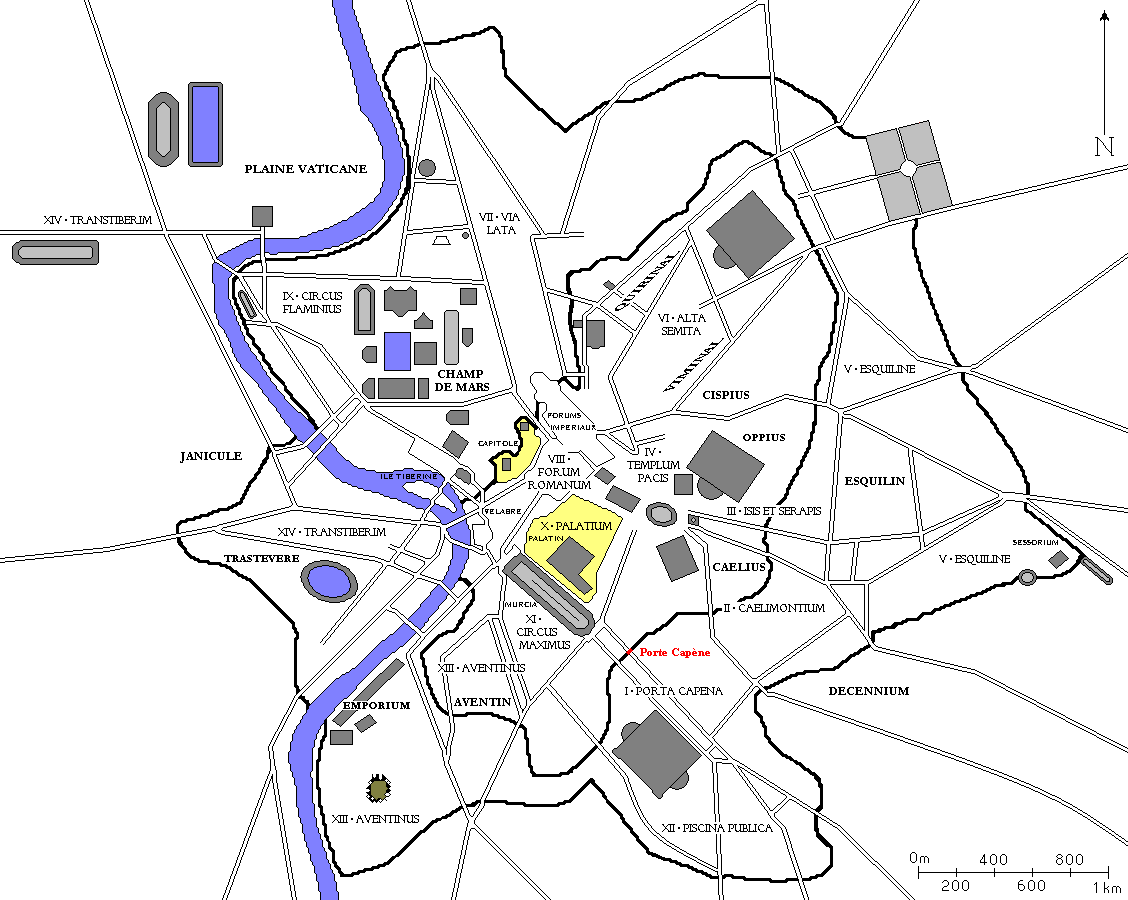
Location of the gate

The Porta Capena was a gate in the Servian Wall in Rome, Italy. The gate was located in the area of Piazza di Porta Capena, where the Caelian, Palatine and Aventine hills meet. Probably its exact position was between the entrance of Via di Valle delle Camene and the beginning of Via delle Terme di Caracalla (known as the "Archaeological Walk"), facing the curved side of the Circus Maximus.

Nowadays Piazza di Porta Capena hosts the FAO Headquarters. Between 1937 and 2004, it was home to the obelisk of Axum.

== History ==
The valley around what is now the avenue of the Baths of Caracalla was in ancient times covered with woods, caves, and freshwater springs. In this area (called the valley of the Camenae), considered sacred and mysterious, it is said (and Livy punctually reports) that the peaceful king Numa Pompilius, the first successor of Romulus, had his nocturnal encounters with the goddess (or nymph) Egeria, who on those occasions provided him with all the necessary information for the institution of the rites most pleasing to each divinity, as well as the related priestly functions. Whether he was in good or bad faith, with this expedient the king managed to keep calm for several years a rough and ignorant people, who could not let off steam in the war. Therefore, this area can be considered the cradle of the religion of ancient Rome.

Its location and some testimonies suggest that the gate was originally called Camena and that its construction may even be earlier than that of the Servian Wall. The first historical-legendary mention dates back to the time of King Tullus Hostilius (mid-7th century BC): it refers to the fact that the funerary monument to Horatia – the sister of the Horatii, killed because she was guilty of falling in love of one of the Curiatii – was erected close to the gate.

In 489 BC, it was from Porta Capena that a multitude of young Volsci was driven out of Rome, while they waited for the games, according to the project of Coriolanus to foment their animosity against Rome and prepare for the subsequent war.

In 312 BC the Appian Way was built, starting from the gate and having the city of Capua as its arrival point: for this reason, the name of the gate was changed into Capena and the whole area, already relevant for various reasons, assumed a very important role as a major point of transit and contact with southern Italy.

In literary evidence, the gate is also mentioned for another important event that deeply marked the history of Rome: as Livy reports, after the disastrous battle of Cannae, the Senate met to assess the situation "ad portam Capenam", which was one of the three meeting places of the assembly.

The procession that introduced in Rome the goddess Cybele (the "Magna Mater"), which was one of the first representatives of foreign cults and rites later culminated with the affirmation of Christianity, also passed through Porta Capena.

=== Decline and destruction ===
According to Juvenal, in the 1st century A.D., the area of Porta Capena had lost its historical and legendary importance and had become a meeting place for beggars, especially those of the Jewish religion. The last use of the gate was as a supporting arch for the passage of the Aqua Marcia aqueduct.

Porta Capena was destroyed and the entire area restructured by Emperor Caracalla; the access to Rome was later transferred a little further on, through the new Porta Appia which opened into the Aurelian Wall. Its remains, while no longer visible today, were traced during the excavations carried out in 1867.

== In popular culture ==
- Porta Capena was featured as a location visited by the Cornelii family in the popular Latin textbook series, Ecce Romani.

== Bibliography ==
- M. Modolo, "Il rudere anonimo del Parco di Porta Capena a Roma", in: D. Manacorda, R. Santangeli Valenzani (edited by), Il primo miglio della Via Appia a Roma, Croma, Rome 2010, pp. 24–38.
- L. G. Cozzi: Le porte di Roma. F. Spinosi Ed., Rome, 1968.
