= Rioni of Rome =

Traditional administrative division of the city of Rome

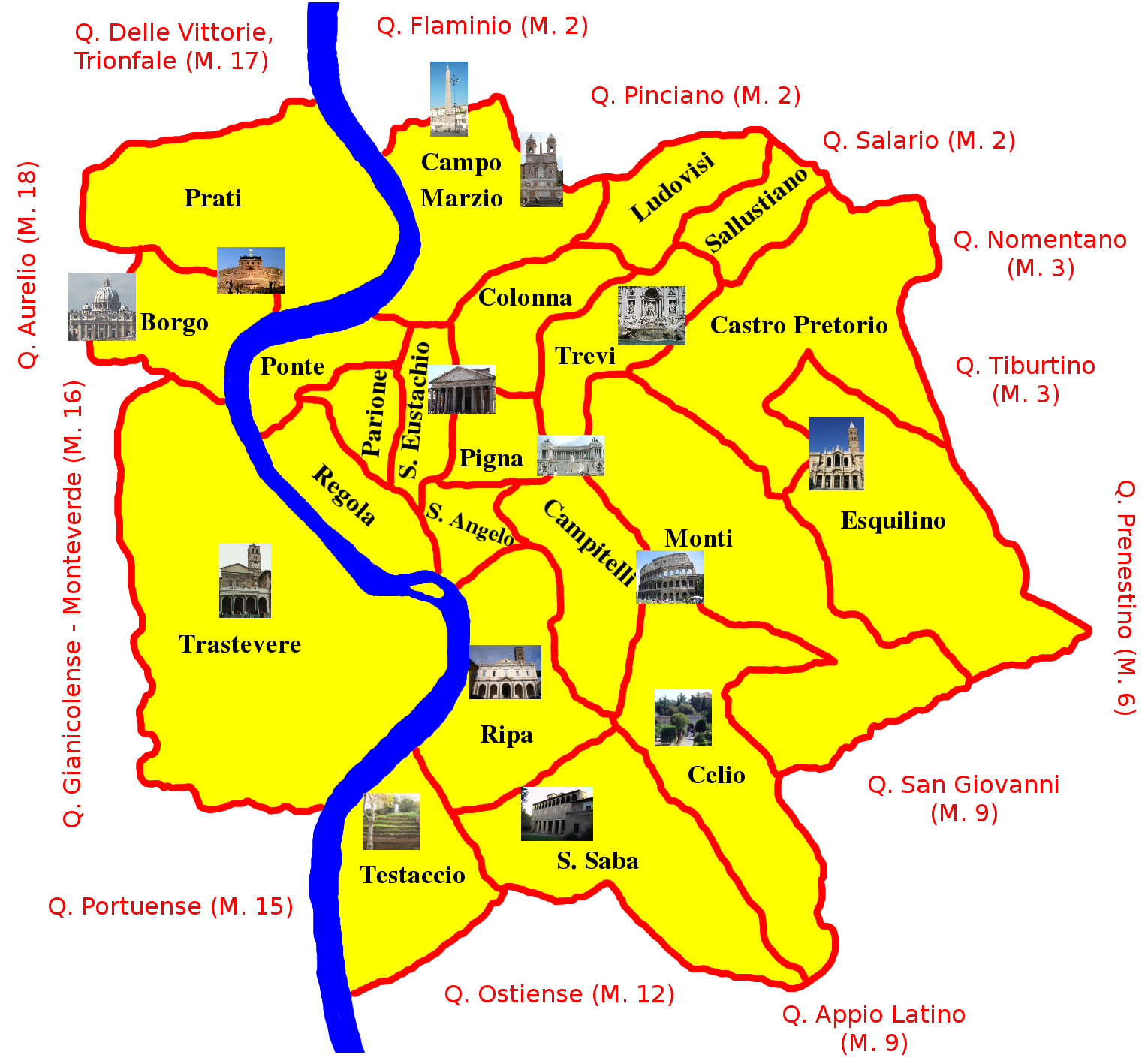
A map of the center of Rome (the centro storico, roughly corresponding to the walled city) with its rioni

A rione of Rome (Italian: [riˈoːne]; pl.: rioni of Rome) is a traditional administrative division of the city of Rome. Rione is an Italian term used since the 14th century to name a district of a town. The term was born in Rome, originating from the administrative divisions of the city. The word comes from the Latin word regio (pl.: regiones), 'region'; during the Middle Ages the Latin word became rejones, from which rione comes. Currently, all the rioni are located in Municipio I of Rome.

== Ancient Rome ==
According to tradition, Servius Tullius, sixth king of Rome, first divided the city into regiones, numbering four. During administrative reorganization after the Roman Republic collapsed, the first emperor Augustus created the 14 regiones of Rome that were to remain in effect throughout the Imperial era, as attested by the 4th-century Cataloghi regionari, that name them and provide data for each. All but Transtiberim (the modern Trastevere) were on the left bank of the River Tiber. The regions were:

1. Porta Capena
2. Caelimontium
3. Isis et Serapis
4. Templum Pacis
5. Esquiliae
6. Alta Semita
7. Via Lata
8. Forum Romanum
9. Circus Flaminius
10. Palatium
11. Circus Maximus
12. Piscina Publica
13. Aventinus
14. Transtiberim

== Middle Ages ==
After the fall of the Western Roman Empire and the decline of Rome, the population decreased and the division into regiones was lost. During the 12th century a division in 12 parts started being used, although not officially, but simply by the common use of the people. Even if the areas were different from the ancient ones, they still used the same name: regio in Latin and rione in the vulgar language.

The limits of the rioni became more definitive and official in the 13th century: their number increased to 13 and it remained the same until the 16th century. In this period, anyway, the limits were quite uncertain. The rione was not a political entity, but only an administrative one. The chief of a rione was the Caporione.

== Modern ages ==
During the Renaissance there was a deep reorganization and expansion of the city, so it became necessary to delimit the rioni exactly.

In 1586 Pope Sixtus V added to the 13 rioni another one: Borgo, which before had been administered separately from the city. This situation, thanks to the low population increase, did not change until the 19th century.

In 1744 Pope Benedict XIV, because of frequent misunderstanding, decided to replan the administrative division of Rome, giving the responsibility of it to Count Bernardini. The marble plates defining the borders of each rione, many of which still exist, were installed in that year on the facades of houses lying at each rione's border.

In 1798, during the Roman Republic, there was a rationalization of the administrative division of the city creating 12 rioni (with the modern rione in parentheses):

1. Terme (part of Monti)
2. Suburra (part of Monti)
3. Quirinale (Trevi)
4. Pincio (Colonna)
5. Marte (Campo Marzio)
6. Bruto (Ponte)
7. Pompeo (Regola and Parione)
8. Flaminio (Sant'Eustachio)
9. Pantheon (Pigna and Sant'Angelo)
10. Campidoglio (Campitelli e Ripa)
11. Gianicolo (Trastevere)
12. Vaticano (Borgo)

Soon after this, during the domination of Napoleon, Rome was split up in 8 parts, now called Giustizie ('justices'):

1. Monti
2. Trevi
3. Colonna e Campo Marzio
4. Ponte e Borgo
5. Parione e Regola
6. Sant'Eustachio e Pigna
7. Campitelli, Sant'Angelo e Ripa
8. Trastevere

So the smaller rioni were united to the large ones. At this time the French affixed in each street a plate with its name and the areas it belonged to.

== Today ==
After Napoleon lost his power there were no significant changes in the organization of the city until Rome became the capital of the newborn Italy. The needs of the new capital caused a great urbanization and an increase of the population, both within the Aurelian Walls and outside them. In 1874 the rioni became 15, with the addition of Esquilino, created by taking a portion from Monti. At the beginning of the 20th century, some rioni started being split up and the first parts outside the Aurelian Walls started being considered part of the city.

In 1921 the number of the rioni increased to 22. Prati was the last rione to be established and the only one outside the walls of Urbanus VIII.

The latest reform, which is still mostly valid, was made in 1972: Rome was divided in 20 circoscrizioni (later renamed municipi, one of which became later the independent municipality of Fiumicino) and 20 rioni (which together form the Centro Storico) constituted the first one, Municipio I. The two remaining, Borgo and Prati, belonged to Municipio XVII until 2013. Since then they belong with the rest of the rioni as part of Municipio I.

The complete list of the modern rioni, in order of number, is the following:

1. Monti, with the hills of Quirinal and Viminal
2. Trevi
3. Colonna
4. Campo Marzio
5. Ponte
6. Parione
7. Regola
8. Sant'Eustachio
9. Pigna
10. Campitelli, with the Capitol and Palatine Hills
11. Sant'Angelo
12. Ripa, with the Aventine Hill
13. Trastevere, with the so-called "eighth hill", Janiculum
14. Borgo, bordering Vatican City
15. Esquilino, with the eponymous hill
16. Ludovisi
17. Sallustiano
18. Castro Pretorio
19. Celio, with the eponymous hill
20. Testaccio
21. San Saba
22. Prati

== Coat of arms of the modern rioni ==
Media related to Coats of Arms of districts of Rome at Wikimedia Commons

I Monti

II Trevi

III Colonna

IV Campo Marzio

V Ponte

VI Parione

VII Regola

VIII Sant'Eustachio

IX Pigna

X Campitelli

XI Sant'Angelo

XII Ripa

XIII Trastevere

XIV Borgo

XV Esquilino

XVI Ludovisi

XVII Sallustiano

XVIII Castro Pretorio

XIX Celio

XX Testaccio

XXI San Saba

XXII Prati

== See also ==
Media related to Districts of Rome at Wikimedia Commons

- Administrative subdivision of Rome
- Circoscrizione
- Frazione
- Località
- Quartiere
- Rione
- Sestiere
- Terziere

== Sources ==
- Castagnoli, Ferdinando; Cecchelli, Carlo; Giovannoni, Gustavo; Zocca, Mario (1958). Topografia e urbanistica di Roma (in Italian). Bologna: Cappelli.
