= Historic district of Rome =

World heritage site

UNESCO World Heritage Site
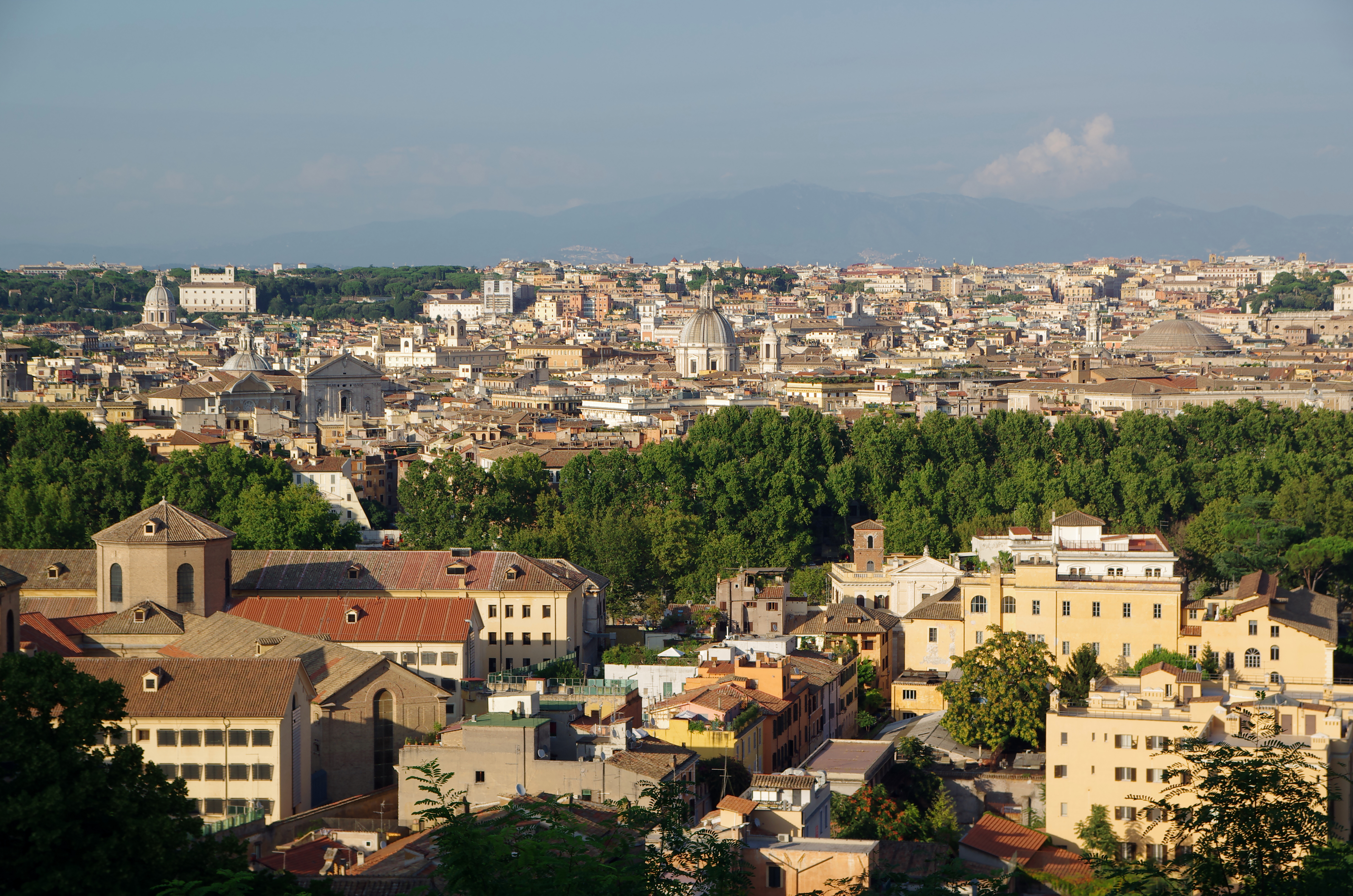

- Location within Rome Location within Italy
- Official name: Historic Centre of Rome, the Properties of the Holy See in that City Enjoying Extraterritorial Rights and San Paolo Fuori le Mura
- Includes: 22 rioni
- Inscription: 1980 (4th Session)
- Extensions: 19.91 km^{2} (7.69 mi^{2})
- Coordinates: 41°53′56″N 12°28′12″E

The historic district of Rome was declared a World Heritage Site by the United Nations Educational, Scientific and Cultural Organization (UNESCO) in 1980. It covers 19.91 square kilometers (7.69 mi^{2}) and is included in 22 rioni with 186,802 inhabitants. There are 25,000 important archaeological sites and locations.

== History ==
=== Foundation to modern times ===
Rome was built from prehistoric human settlements, but the city itself appears to have emerged gradually through synoecism in the mid-eighth century BCE, especially around the Palatine Hill. However, Roman tradition credits the legend of Romulus and Remus with the founding of Rome in 753 BCE. Rome evolved from a monarchy into a republic, and later an empire, becoming the political and cultural centre of the Mediterranean world. Over the course of centuries, Rome shifted from imperial to religious centrality as the seat of the papacy and eventually became a major hub of Renaissance and Baroque culture. In 1871, it became the capital of unified Italy following the Breach of Porta Pia, and expanded rapidly in the modern era.

=== UNESCO World Heritage Site ===
The historic centre of Rome came to be protected through both national conservation efforts and international recognition. The historic centre, meeting five of the ten criteria, was inscribed on the UNESCO World Heritage List in 1980, acknowledging the area's archaeological, artistic, and religious significance. The protected zone was then expanded in 1990 to include the walls of Urban VIII, certain extraterritorial properties of the Holy See, and the Basilica of Saint Paul Outside the Walls.

== Demographics ==
Rioni (1-11)	Population (2015)	Rioni (12-22)	Population (2015)
Monti	2,484	Ripa	2,447
Trevi	2,249	Trastevere	17,115
Colonna	1,467	Borgo	2,763
Campo Marzio	4,722	Esquilino	22,709
Ponte	2,981	Ludovisi	1,379
Parione	1,790	Sallustiano	1,365
Regola	3,148	Castro Pretorio	3,709
Sant'Eustachio	1,027	Celio	3,224
Pigna	4,784	Testaccio	6,536
Campitelli	4,195	San Saba	4,227
Sant'Angelo	2,578	Prati	14,759

=== Ethnic origins ===
The district of Rome saw large genetic shifts towards Eastern Mediterranean and Near East ancestry during the imperial era when Augustus Caesar took power as the first Emperor (27 BCE). During this period, Rome expanded to encompass the Mediterranean region; thus, the settlement and movement of individuals of Eastern origin into Rome was facilitated. Furthermore, archeological evidence shows that after Latin, inscriptions were often found in Greek, Hebrew, and Aramaic.

After 330 BCE, during the Antiquity period, the citizens of Rome were found to have a greater Central and Northern European background; however, the overall population makeup remained variable. During this period, Rome’s population shrunk and Constantinople became the international trading hub. This trend continued into the Modern era. The extreme variability can be explained by their prior status as a main trading point, slavery, and conquest.

=== Religion ===
The historic centre of Rome is associated with the origins of Christianity. Currently, within the historic district of Rome, 48% of residents identify as non-practicing religious, 18.5% practice a religion, and 31% identify as non-religious. Of those that identify as religious, 58% identify as Catholic, 2.7% identify as Protestant, 2.5% identify as Buddhist, 2.3% identify as Orthodox Christian, and less than 1% identify as Jewish or other. Historically, the Jewish population has resided in the 11th rione, Sant’Angelo, because of the Jewish Ghetto that was established by Pope Paul IV in 1555.

== Geography ==
=== Location ===
The historic district of Rome is situated in the Lazio region of central Italy, on the banks of the Tiber River. The city’s geography is defined by hills: the Aventine, Caelian, Capitoline, Esquiline, Palatine, Quirinial, and Viminal. These volcanic ridges provided strategic defensive advantages for the ancient city. The historic district lies primarily on the east bank of the Tiber, though it includes a portion of the Trastevere district on the west bank. The area is characterized by its Mediterranean climate and its location within the Roman Campagna, approximately 24 km inland from the Tyrrhenian Sea.

=== Ancient landmarks ===
The Colosseum, located in Piazza del Colosseo, is the largest amphitheatre in the world. Before damage by earthquakes, the structure had a capacity of 50,000 spectators. It was used for public spectacles such as executions and dramas inspired by Roman Mythology. Today, it is one of the most famous tourist attractions in the historic centre.

The Roman Forum is located between the Palatine and Capitoline Hills. The Forum houses government buildings and a marketplace. It served as a central space for daily activities in Roman society, as well as a venue for public announcements and legal proceedings. Today, the Forum consists of archeological remains of former structures and is visited annually by numerous tourists and archaeologists.

The Imperial Fora (Fori Imperiali) is located near the Roman Forum, between the Palatine and Capitoline Hills. The Imperial Fora consists of four forums: Forum of Caesar, Forum of Augustus, Forum of Nerva, and Forum of Trajan. The Fora also houses the Temple of Peace, which was not considered an official forum due to a lack of civil function.

=== Public squares and fountains ===
Piazza del Popolo is a public square situated inside the ancient Aurelian Walls at the northern entrance into Rome, originally known as Via Flaminia. The square, previously used for public executions, was linked to the Pincian Hill by Valadier. The hill serves as a lookout mainly as the Pincio Terrace.

Piazza Navona is a public square situated in the heart of the historic centre. Known to Ancient Romans as “Circus Agonalis” (“competition arena” in Italian). An example of Baroque architecture, Piazza Navona is home to three famous fountains: Fountain of the Four Rivers, Fontana Del Moro, and Fountain of Neptune.

Piazza della Rotonda is a public square known for its bird market in Ancient Rome. It is now most known for the Pantheon, a temple built to honour the gods. Since the 7th century, it has been used as a church dedicated to St. Mary.

Piazza di Spagna is a public square named after the Palazzo di Spagna. The square is connected to Trinita dei Monti via the Spanish Steps, consisting of 135 steps in total, which were funded by the French diplomat Holy See Étienne Gueffier after his death in 1660.

The Trevi Fountain, located in the Trevi district, is the largest Baroque fountain in the city. The fountain is traditionally filled with coins thrown over the shoulder by visitors, in accordance with a custom believed to ensure a return to Rome or the prospect of finding love.

=== Palaces and modern monuments ===
The Victor Emmanuelle II Monument is located in between the Piazza Venezia and Capitoline Hill, built to honour the first king of a unified Italy, Victor Emmanuelle II. The monument is referred to as “The Typewriter” or “Wedding Cake” due to its size and colour. It can also be referred to as Altare della Patria, after the altar the monument preserves. The altar is home to the Tomb of the Unknown Soldier.

Palazzo Senatorio located on the Capitoline Hill and designed by Michelangelo, houses the Roman City Hall.

Palazzo Nuovo located on the Capitoline Hill was built across from and in the exact image of Palazzo dei Conservatori to ensure symmetry of the Campidoglio.

Castel Sant’Angelo is a mausoleum commissioned by the Roman Empire Hadrian for himself and his family. Once the tallest structure in Rome with decorations, it now functions as a museum, with much of its original ornamentation lost over time.

== Tourism ==
The historic district of Rome has undergone several redevelopments in the 20th and 21st centuries to commercialize the rioni for tourism. Introduction of guided tours, development of shopping complexes and artisan markets, gentrification of vintage shops, and emergence of bars and modern nightlife have occurred in many rioni like Campo Marzio, Monti, Pigna, and Trastevere.

Restoration and urbanization in Celio and Borgo has further aided tourism in these rioni. Celio’s Parco archeologico del Celio underwent significant renovations as part of the Municipality of Rome’s broader CArMe (Monumental Archaeological Center) project. It reopened in January 2024 with new museums, architectural structures, and environmental spaces. In late 2024, Borgo’s Piazza Pia was significantly redeveloped to a major pedestrian-only plaza for the 2025 Jubilee, such that it connected Castel Sant’Angelo to St. Peter’s Square. It featured upgraded street lighting and green spaces, improved accessibility pathways, and new architecture, like fountains and stairs.
