= Palazzo Borromeo =

Palazzo Borromeo may refer to:

- Palazzo Borromeo (Isola Bella)
- Palazzo Borromeo (Milan)
- Palazzo Borromeo d'Adda
- Palazzo Arese Borromeo (Cesano Maderno)
- Palazzo Gabrielli-Borromeo (Rome)
