= Archingeay =

- Commune
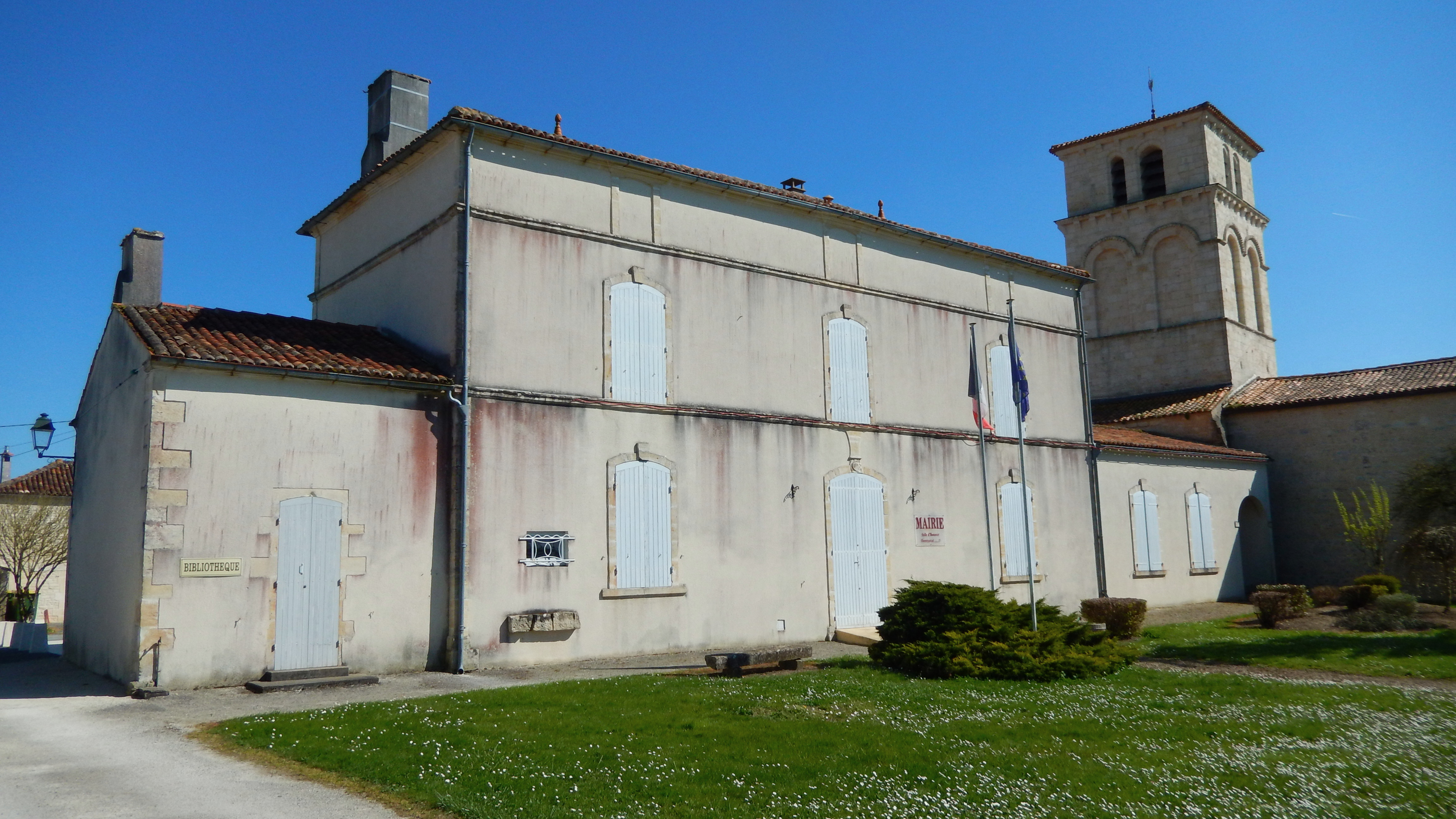
- The town hall in Archingeay
- Location of Archingeay
- Location within France Location within Nouvelle-Aquitaine
- Coordinates: 45°55′54″N 0°42′17″W
- Country: France
- Region: Nouvelle-Aquitaine
- Department: Charente-Maritime
- Arrondissement: Saint-Jean-d'Angély
- Canton: Saint-Jean-d'Angély
- Intercommunality: Vals de Saintonge

Government
  - Mayor (2020–2026): Rémi Lamare
- Area^{1}: 16.61 km^{2} (6.41 sq mi)
- Elevation: 24 m (79 ft)
- Highest elevation: 47 m (154 ft)
- Lowest elevation: 2 m (6.6 ft)
- Population (2023): 765
  - Density: 46.1/km^{2} (119/sq mi)
- Time zone: UTC+01:00 (CET)
  - Summer (DST): UTC+02:00 (CEST)
- INSEE/Postal code: 17017 /17380
- ^{1} French Land Register data, which excludes lakes, ponds, glaciers > 1 km^{2} (0.386 sq mi or 247 acres) and river estuaries.

Archingeay (French pronunciation: [aʁʃɛ̃ʒɛ]) is a commune in the Charente-Maritime department in the Nouvelle-Aquitaine region of southwestern France.

== Geography ==
Archingeay is located some 32 km south of Surgeres and 30 km east of Rochefort. Access to the commune is by the D114 road which branches off the D739E south of Tonnay-Boutonne and continues south through the commune and village to Saint-Savinien. The D122 also goes south-west from the village to join the D124 which continues to Bords. The D122E1 also goes east from the village to Beaujouet. Apart from the village there are also the hamlets of:

- Charnais
- Cheniers
- Chez Bayeau
- Chez Brandeau
- Chez Brard
- Chez Pepin
- Chez Trancard
- Coulon
- Fontaudet
- L'Aiguille
- Le Mouton
- Le Tricholet
- Les Pavageauds
- Port L'Aubier

The commune is mixed forest and farmland.

The Boutonne river forms much of the north-western border of the commune with a network of irrigation canals covering the western part of the commune. Le Pepin stream rises south of the village and flows west into the Boutonne.

== Toponymy ==
The name may come from the name of the Roman general Arcantius.

== History ==
This commune had an Abbey which has completely disappeared.

In the past, Archingeay enjoyed a flourishing period, mainly due to a hot spring near the Chateau of the Valley to the west of Archingeay and renowned for its therapeutic properties (digestive diseases, skin etc.). Among other famous spa guests, the Roman general Arcantius took its waters.

Until the attack of phylloxera there was manufacturing of pottery, bricks and tiles, and wine production.

== Administration ==
List of Successive Mayors

From	To	Name
2001	2009	Jean-Pierre Jacques
2009	2014	Jean-Claude Denner
2014	2026	Rémi Lamare

== Demography ==
The inhabitants of the commune are known as Arcantois or Arcantoises in French.

Historical population

Year	Pop.	±% p.a.
1793	829	—
1800	1,012	+2.89%
1806	1,023	+0.18%
1821	1,005	−0.12%
1831	1,085	+0.77%
1836	1,130	+0.82%
1841	1,168	+0.66%
1846	1,162	−0.10%
1851	1,075	−1.54%
1856	1,067	−0.15%
1861	1,103	+0.67%
1866	1,142	+0.70%
1872	1,101	−0.61%
1876	1,083	−0.41%
1881	1,034	−0.92%
1886	1,012	−0.43%
1891	978	−0.68%
1896	932	−0.96%
1901	919	−0.28%

Year	Pop.	±% p.a.
1906	871	−1.07%
1911	852	−0.44%
1921	763	−1.10%
1926	750	−0.34%
1931	668	−2.29%
1936	647	−0.64%
1946	608	−0.62%
1954	627	+0.39%
1962	603	−0.49%
1968	536	−1.94%
1975	504	−0.88%
1982	527	+0.64%
1990	539	+0.28%
1999	519	−0.42%
2007	608	+2.00%
2012	682	+2.32%
2017	671	−0.32%
2023	765	+2.21%

Source: EHESS and INSEE

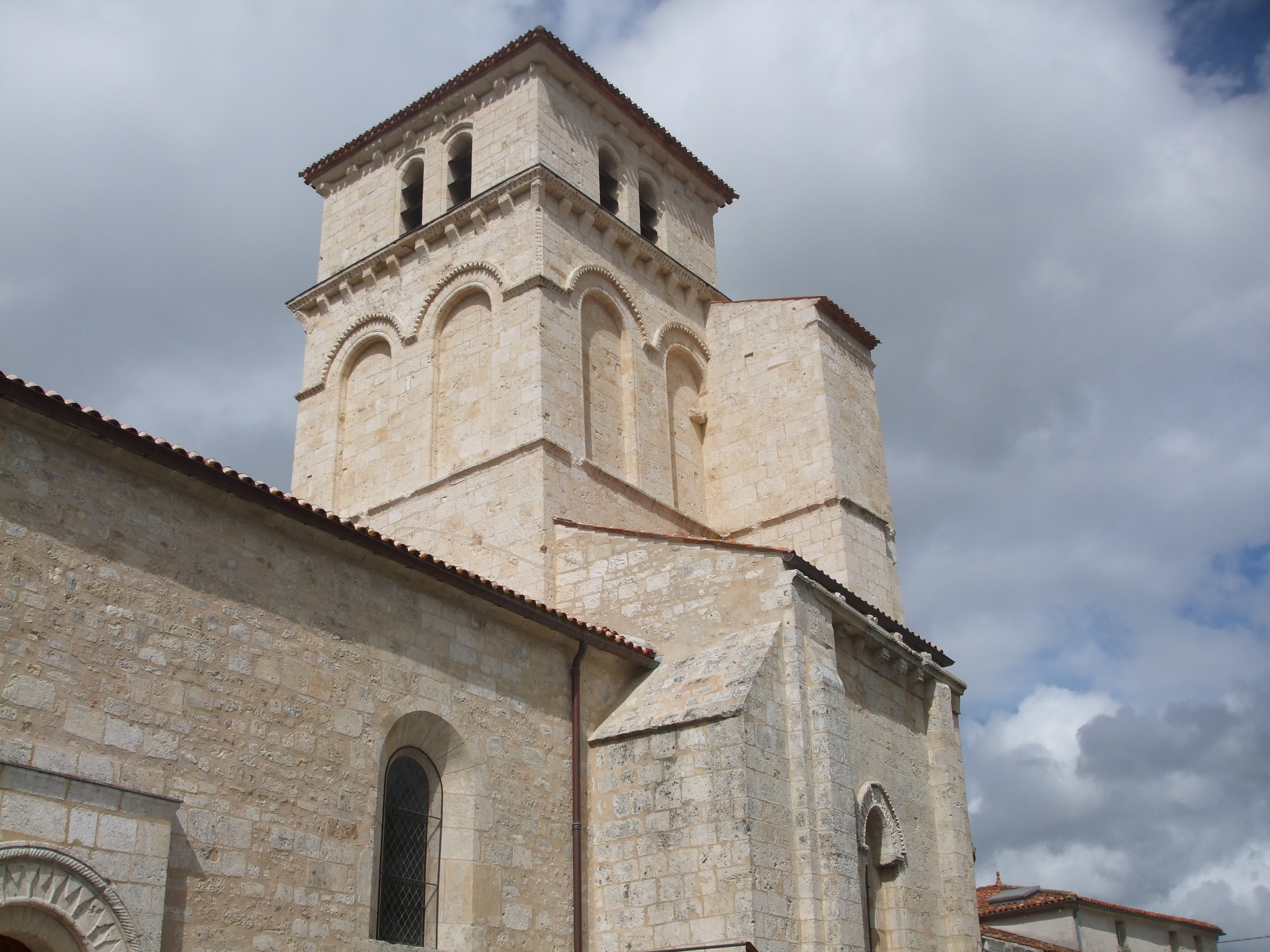
Church of Saint Martin

== Sites and Monuments ==
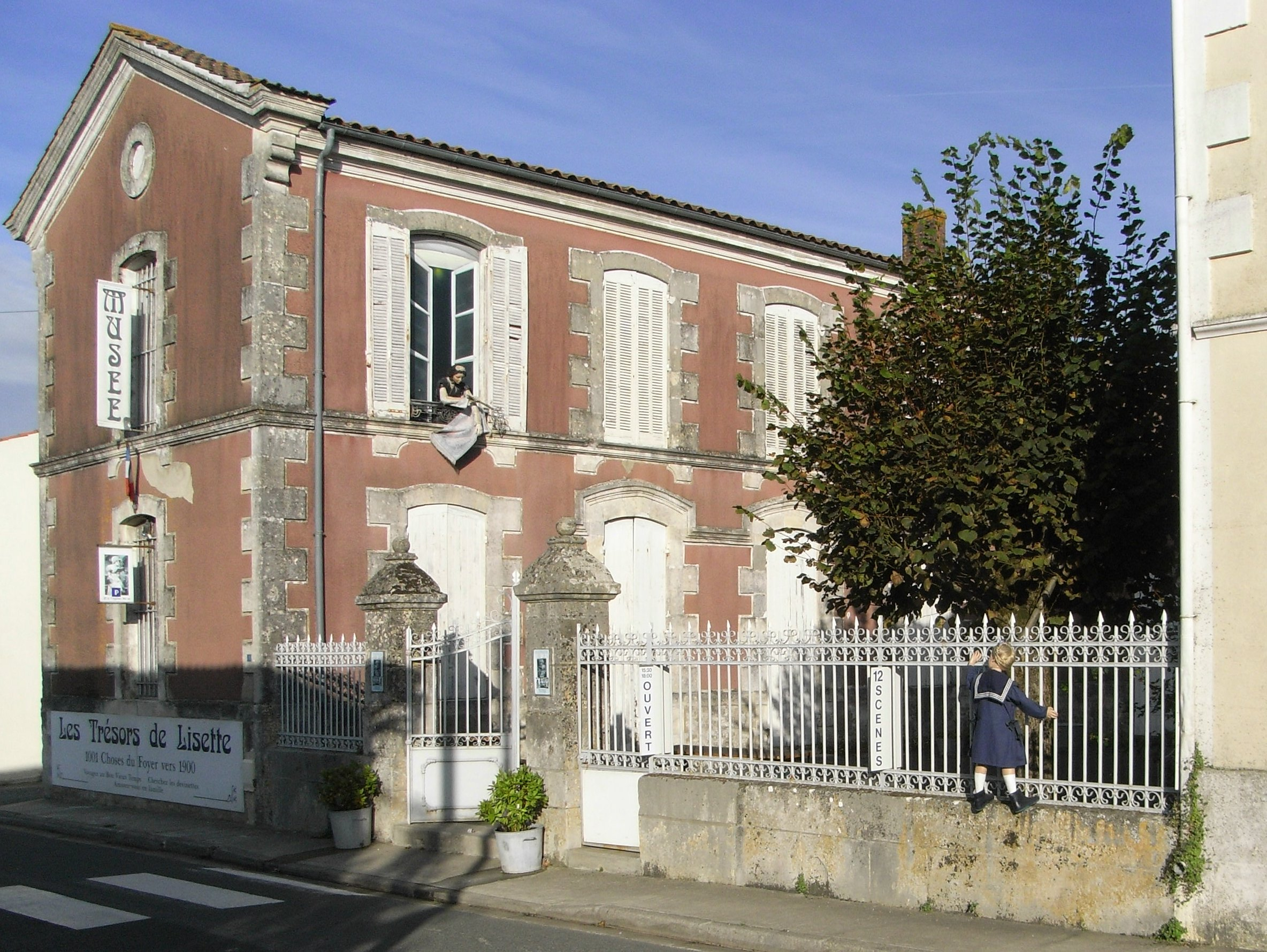
The Trésors de Lisette Museum

- The Romanesque Church of Saint Martin (12th century) is registered as an historical monument. It has sculptures at the south door and both interior and exterior corbels depicting life at the time. the main Altar and Tabernacle (18th century) are registered as an historical object.
- A Ferruginous Fountain known by the Romans for healing properties (skin diseases). In the Gallo-Roman period, the Roman general Arcantius spent time at the spa.
- A Lavoir (Public Laundry) dating from Roman times.
- The Trésors de Lisette Museum which presents family life in the early 20th century with one of the largest exhibitions of old culinary objects in Europe. It opens during June, July and August from 3 p.m. (15:00) to 7 p.m. (19:00).

== Notable People linked to the commune ==
- Saint Malo, who founded the city of Saint-Malo, died at Archingeay.
- Arcantius, a Roman general who took the waters of a thermal spring at La Vallée which was renowned for its therapeutic properties
- The Montaigne Family who lived in the Chateau of the Valley.

== See also ==
- Communes of the Charente-Maritime department
