= Malo (saint) =

Founder of Saint-Malo, Brittany (d. 621)

Saint Malo of Aleth
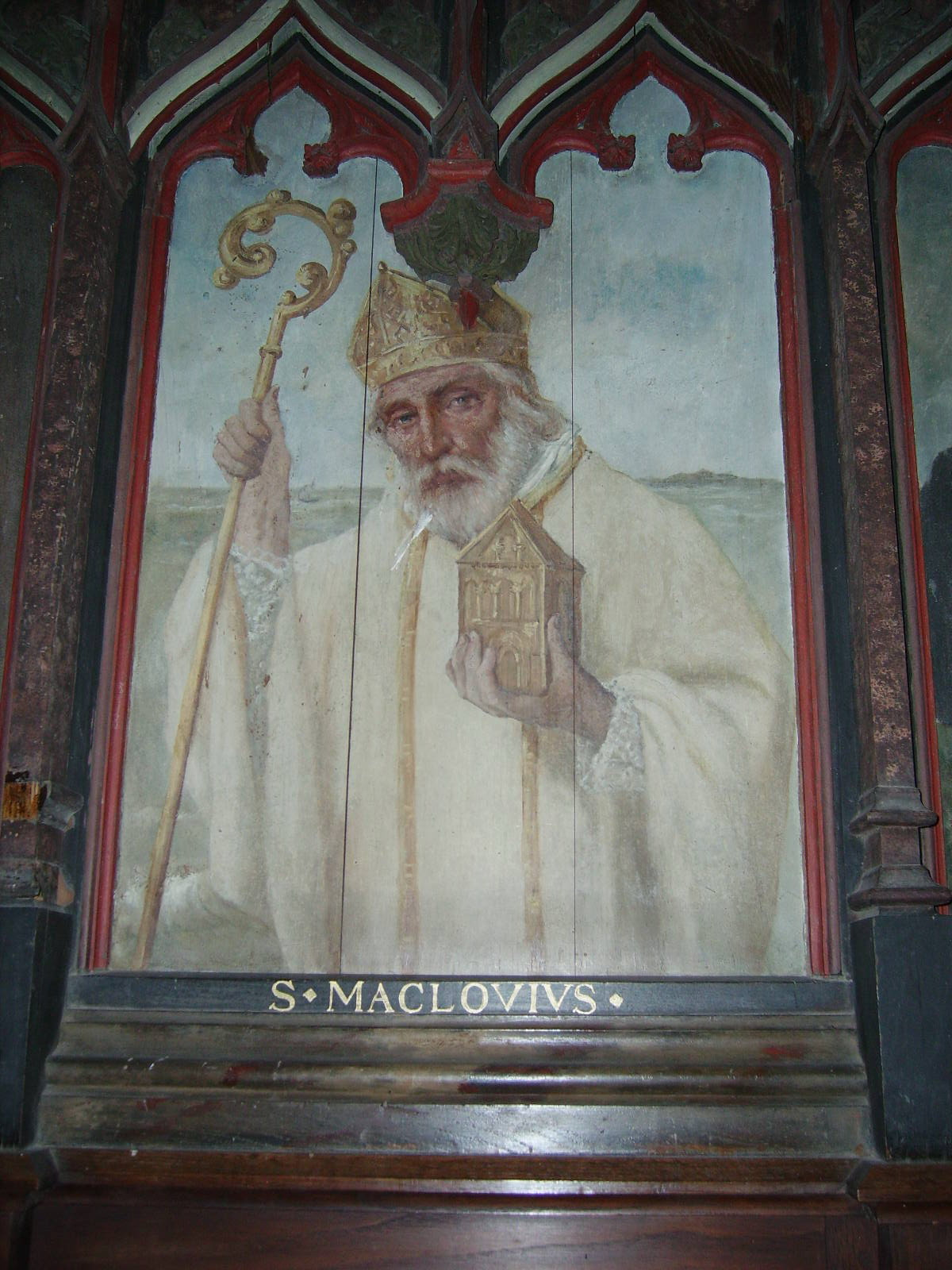
- Saint Malo
- Born: 27 March 520 AD; Traditionally Llancarfan, Glywysing
- Died: 15 November 621 AD (Note: This may have been the death date of another Saint, Marcoult.); Archambiac, Duchy of Aquitaine
- Venerated in: Anglican Communion; Roman Catholic Church; Eastern Orthodox Church
- Major shrine: Saint-Malo Cathedral
- Feast: 15 November
- Attributes: Depicted as an abbot and a bishop
- Patronage: Saint-Malo, pig-keepers, lost items

Saint Malo (French pronunciation: [sɛ̃.ma.lo]; also known as Maclou, Maloù, or in Latin as Maclovius or Machutus, c. 27 March 520 AD – 15 November 621 AD) was a Welsh mid-sixth century founder of Saint-Malo, a commune in Brittany, France. He was one of the seven founding saints of Brittany.

== Life ==
Malo's name may derive from the Old Breton machlou, a compound of mach "warrant, hostage" and lou (or loh) "brilliant, bright, beautiful".

Malo was probably born in Llancarfan (Wales) in approximately 520. He was the son of Dervel, sister of Amwn Ddu, and therefore cousin to St. Samson. He was placed in the abbot's care at a young age, and grew up at the abbey, where he was ordained priest and assigned the office of preacher.

== Voyages with Brendan ==
As a monk at Llancarfan Abbey in Wales, Malo was known for his participation in the voyage of Brendan the Navigator. Malo became Brendan's favourite disciple.

A number of legendary tales of the adventures of Brendan and Malo survive. According to the Voyage of Saint Brendan the Abbot, they and their companions discovered the "Island of the Blest". Another story tells of an encounter with Maclovius, a dead giant whom Brendan temporarily revives and baptizes.

On a second voyage, Brendan and Malo are said to have visited and evangelized locations including Cézembre, the Orkney Islands, and the northern isles of Scotland.

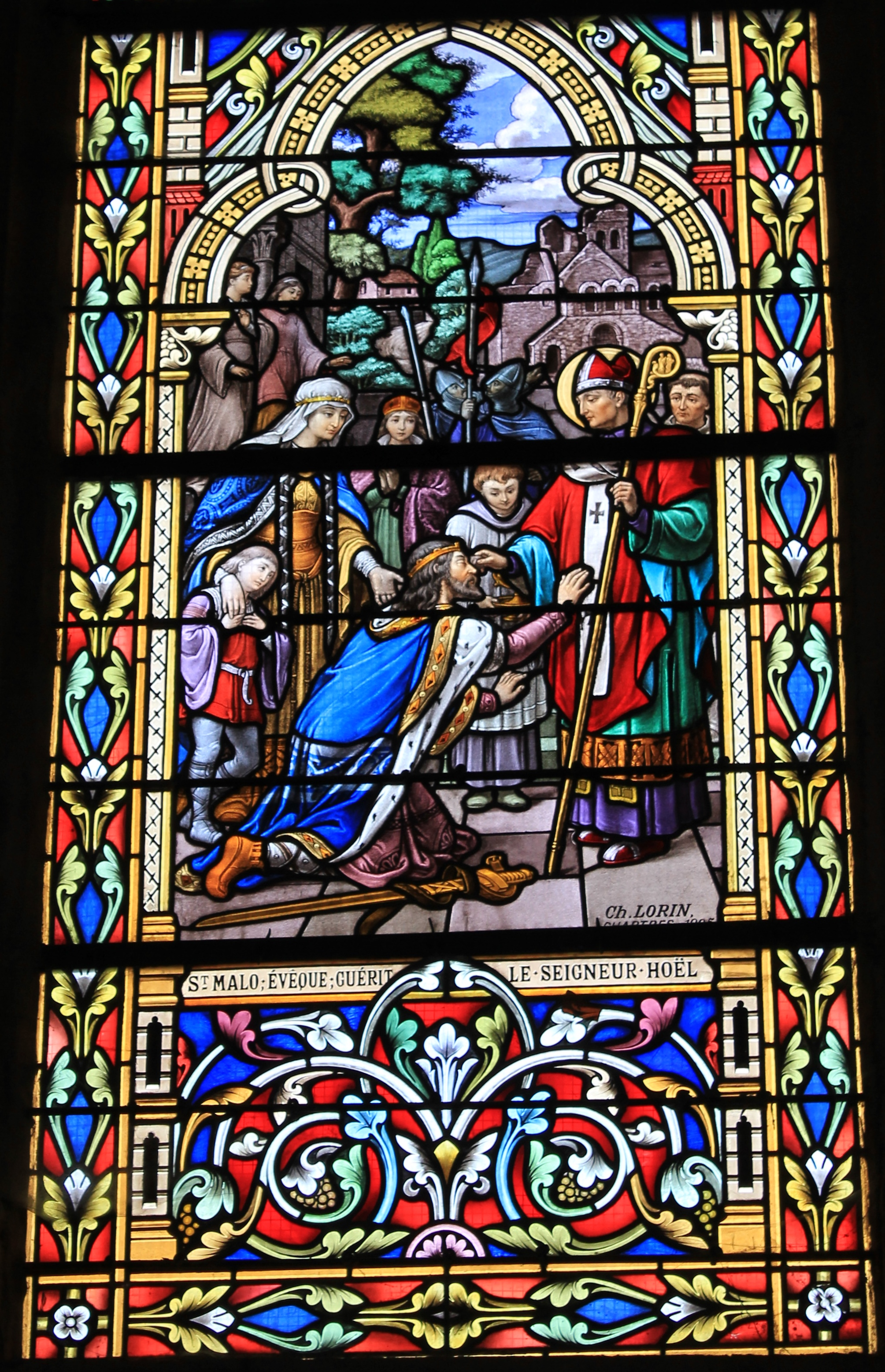
Malo and Hoel in a stained-glass window in Réguiny in Brittany, northern France.

== Breton evangelist ==
At Aleth, Malo served under a venerable hermit named Aaron. Upon Aaron's death in 544, Malo continued the spiritual rule of the district subsequently known as Saint-Malo and was consecrated as the first Bishop of Aleth (now Saint Servan). Many miracles are related of him there.

In old age, the disorder on the island compelled Malo to leave, but the people soon begged him to return. He obliged his people and returned to restore order. Feeling at the end of his life, Malo was determined to spend his last days in solitary penance. He died at an advanced age during a voyage from Aleth to Archambiac (near Archingeay) in the province of Saintonge. Malo might have died on 15 November 621 (although this may be the death date of Saint Marcoult).

== Veneration ==
The city of Saint-Malo is one of the seven stages in the Tro Breizh ("Tour of Brittany", in Breton), a pilgrimage celebrating the seven founding saints of Brittany.

Indirectly, the Spanish name of the Falkland Islands, Islas Malvinas, can be traced to Malo, as it is derived from the French, Îles Malouines and named by Louis Antoine de Bougainville in 1764 after the first known settlers: mariners, and fishermen from the port of Saint-Malo.

Pontoise Cathedral is dedicated to Saint Malo. Lesmahagow Priory in South Lanarkshire is also dedicated to him in the Latin form of his name, Machutus. He is the patron saint of the churches of St. Maughans and Llanfaenor in Monmouthshire and Llanfechell in Anglesey.

The place-name Saint-Maclou also refers to him.

There is a church in Rome dedicated to him as San Macuto, Rome, on Piazza di San Macuto.

== See also ==
- Blessed Julian Maunoir, "Apostle of Brittany"

== Sources ==
- Baring-Gould, S.; Fisher, J. (1911). Lives of the British Saints. Vol. 3. pp. 411–434.
