= San Macuto, Rome =

Coordinates: 41.8993°N 12.4792°E

San Macuto
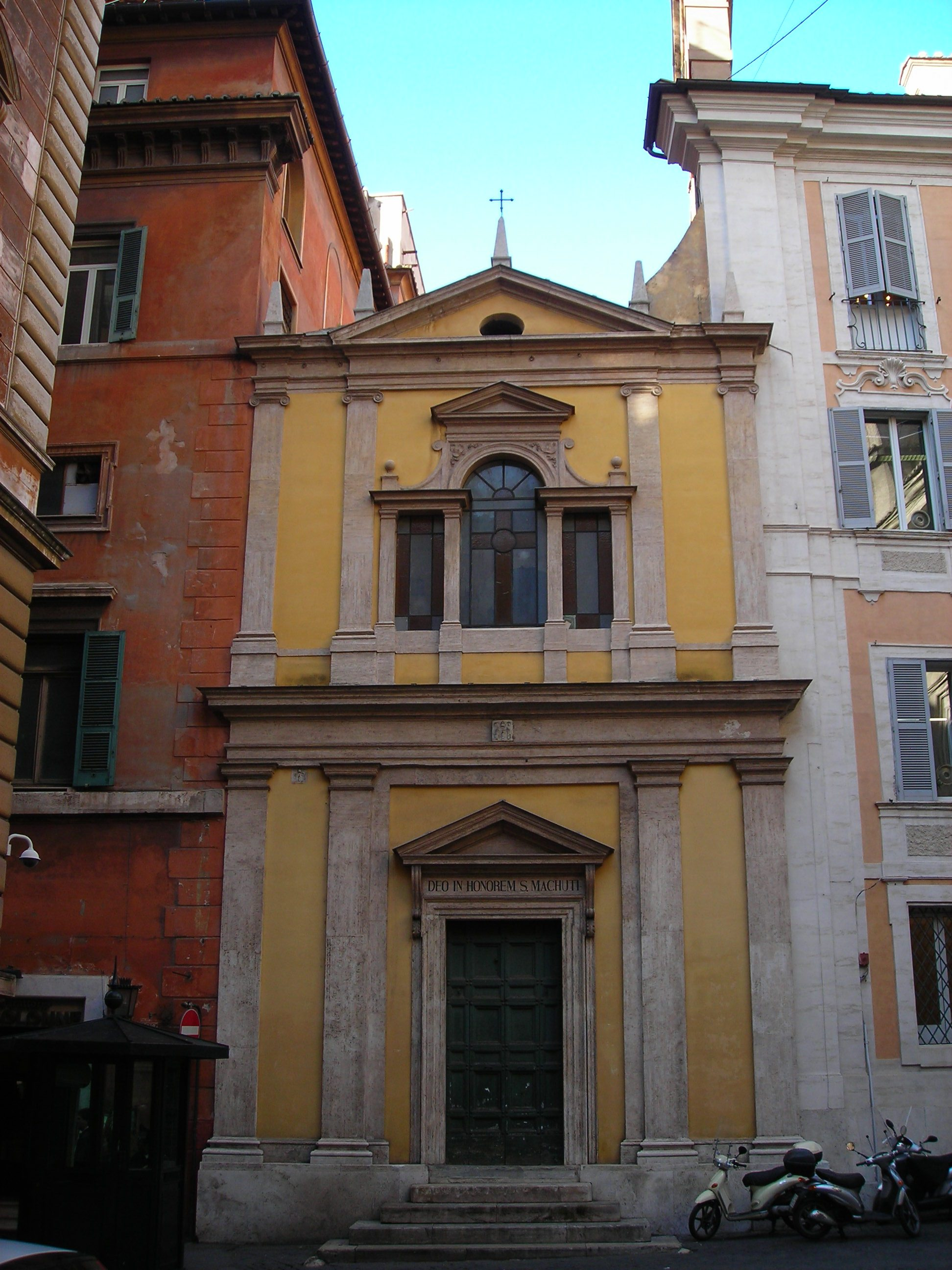
- Church of San Macuto.
- Click on the map for a fullscreen view
- Location: Piazza di San Macuto,Rome
- Country: Italy
- Denomination: Roman Catholic

History
- Dedication: Malo

Architecture
- Architectural type: Church

San Macuto is a Catholic church located on Piazza di San Macuto in the Colonna rione of Rome, Italy. Located next to the Jesuit Collegio di San Roberto Bellarmino in the Palazzo Gabrielli-Borromeo, it is the only church in Italy dedicated to the 7th century Breton saint Malo (Latin: Maclovius or Machutus, hence the vulgarized Macuto).

== History ==
First recorded in 1192, the church of San Macuto has had several owners at different times. In the second half of the 13th century it was dependent on San Marcello al Corso, then later it belonged to the Dominicans from the neighbouring Santa Maria sopra Minerva (confirmed by Pope Nicholas III in 1279). In the year 1422 it was described as a parish church. Pope Leo X joined the parish with that of St. Peter's Basilica in 1516, giving it to the Fraternity of Bergamo in 1539.

The Bergamo monks changed the saint it was dedicated to from Bartholemew to Alexander of Bergamo and the church got a new façade around 1560. The façade was a project of the Ferraran architect Giovanni Alberto Galvani and it was partially reconstructed 1577−1585 to the design of Francesco da Volterra.

Following a decision by Pope Benedict XIII, the Bergamo monks bequeathed their church to the Jesuits from the neighbouring palazzo in 1725−1726. They moved to a church then called Santa Maria della Pietà instead, and changed its name to Santi Bartolomeo ed Alessandro dei Bergamaschi (on the Piazza Colonna). The Jesuits rededicated the church to Saint Malo, following the vicissitudes of history together with the adjacent palazzo (later called Palazzo Gabrielli-Borromeo), which had longer been known as belonging to the Jesuits. It served as the church for the Pontifical Roman Seminary, the Board of Ecclesiastical Nobles, the Collegium Germanicum et Hungaricum, and the Pontifical Gregorian University (1873−1930). Since 1942 it has been part of the Collegio Bellarmino, formerly belonging to the Roman Province of Jesuits, now an international home for the religious order.

== Architecture ==
The single nave church has a façade constructed in the 15th century, initially designed by Galvani. The entryway was further elaborated by Francesco da Volterra around 1575. The interior underwent modifications in 1819 by the architect Benedetto Piernicoli, replacing the original wooden ceiling.

== Interior decoration ==
The Bergamo monks who left the church to the Jesuits took all the furniture to their new home on the Piazza Colonna. The new owners decided to decorate the interior of the church using the three fifteenth-century altars that remained.

The altar of the left wall was built around 1575 by Francesco da Volterra. It has an elegant aedicula with two pilasters with grooved sides and a triangular tympanum made of pavonazzetto-marble. The opposite altar is similar but complementary and is made of stucco. The main altar is decorated with a pair of columns made from African marble. It is crowned with a tympanum with a lunette.

The left altar has a painting (1730s) by Michelangelo Cerruti, depicting The Sacred Heart adored by the Saints John Nepomuk and Aloysius Gonzaga. Cerruti was commissioned by the Jesuits to complete paintings for all the altars. These included The Virgin appears to San Macuto for the main altar, and a Glory of Saint Joseph for the right altar. The San Macuto painting depicts the church of San Macuto and the city of Saint Malo. Previously the church had paintings by Girolamo Muziano, Giuseppe Peruzzini, and Durante Alberti.

== See also ==
- List of Jesuit sites
