= Michelangelo Cerruti =

Italian painter (1663–1749)

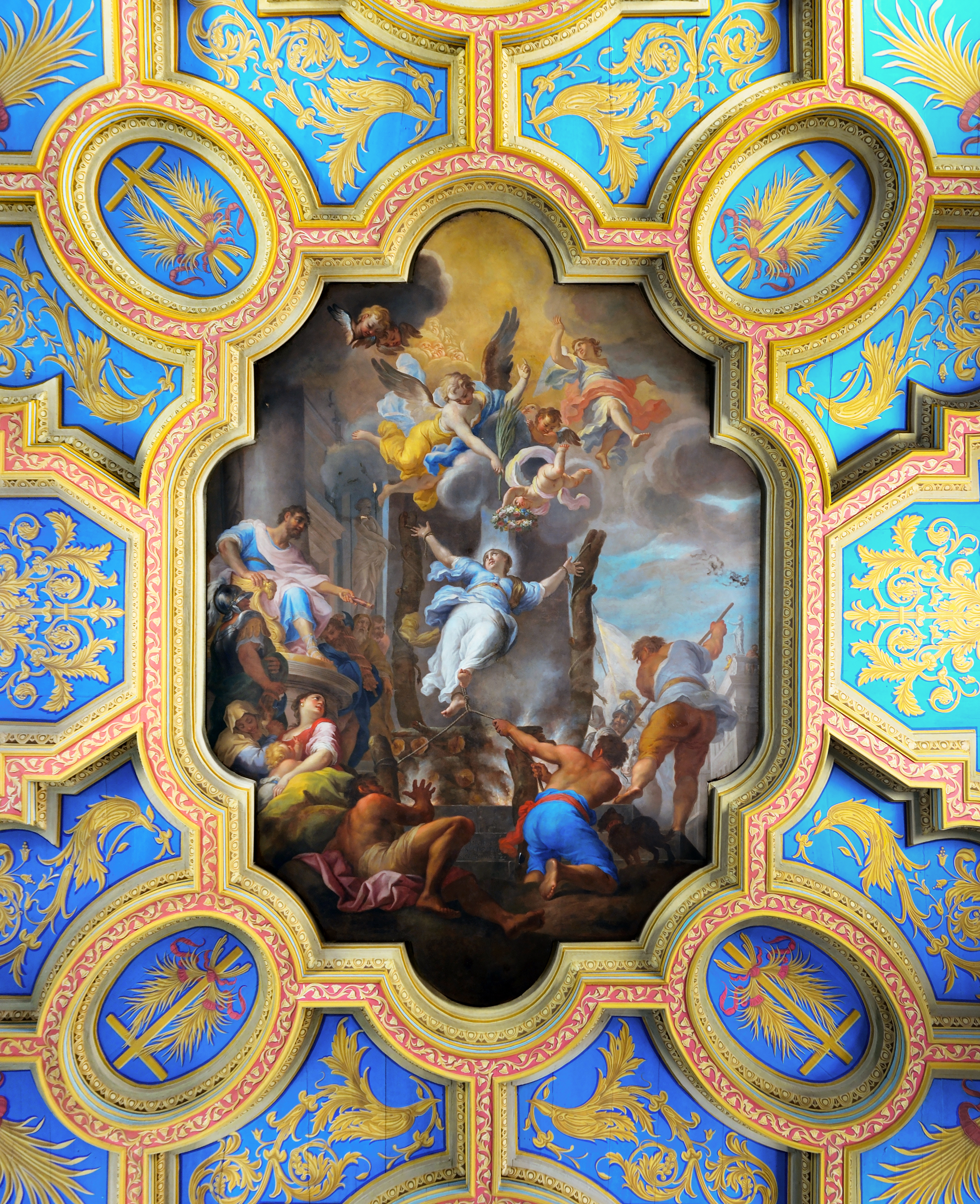
Ceiling of the Santa Anastasia, with his martyrdom of the saints

Michelangelo or Michelangiolo Cerruti (1663 – 24 December 1749) was an Italian painter of the Baroque period, active mainly in Rome.

At a young age, he was a pupil of Giuseppe Passeri in Rome and afterwards lived for a decade in northern Italy, especially in Turin. After returning to Rome, he worked with Andrea Pozzo and became an expert fresco artist. His painterly decorations cover vaults in many Roman churches, including Santa Anastasia and San Macuto. His name is sometimes spelt Cerrutti.
