= Pantheon obelisk =

Egyptian obelisk in Rome

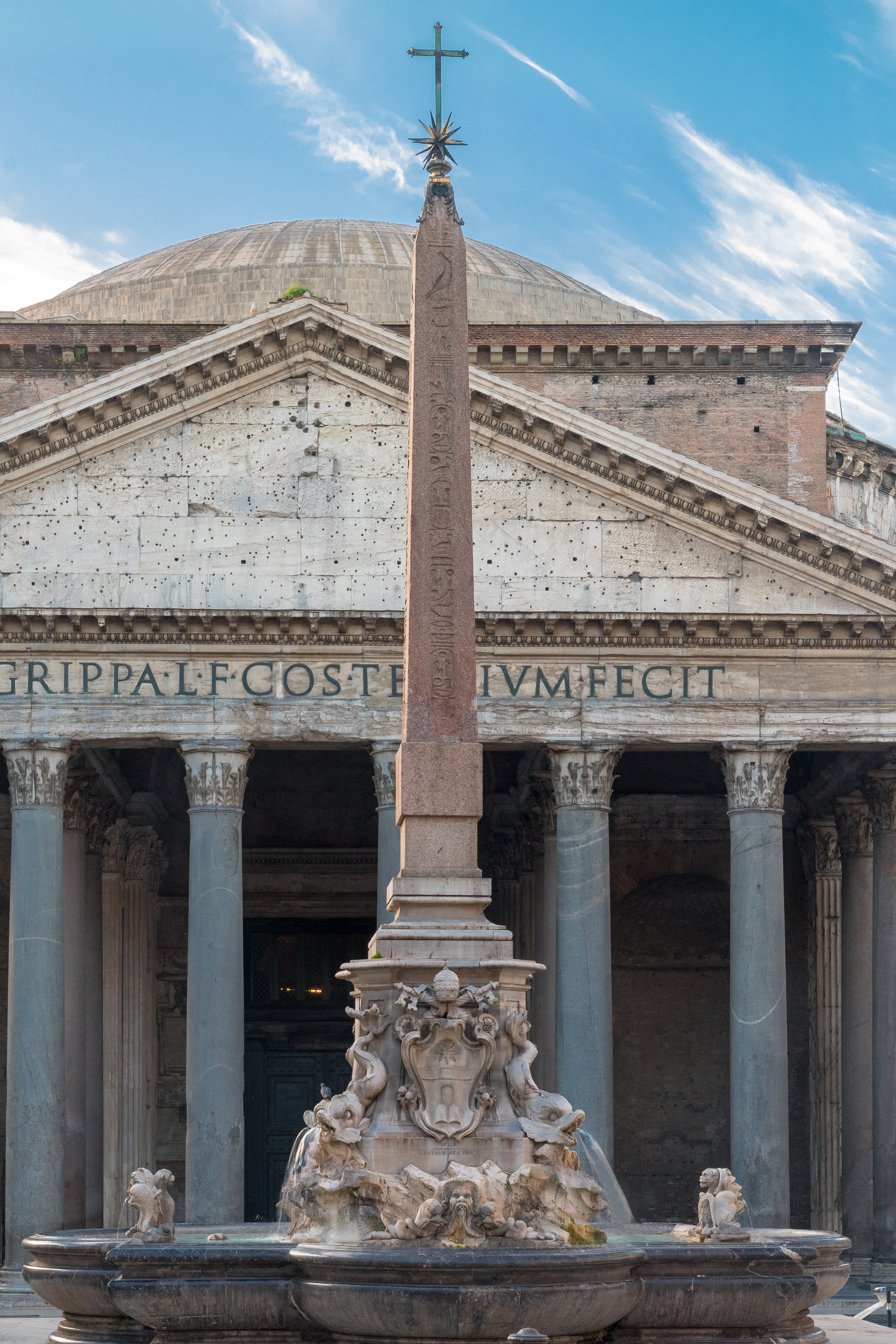
The Pantheon obelisk

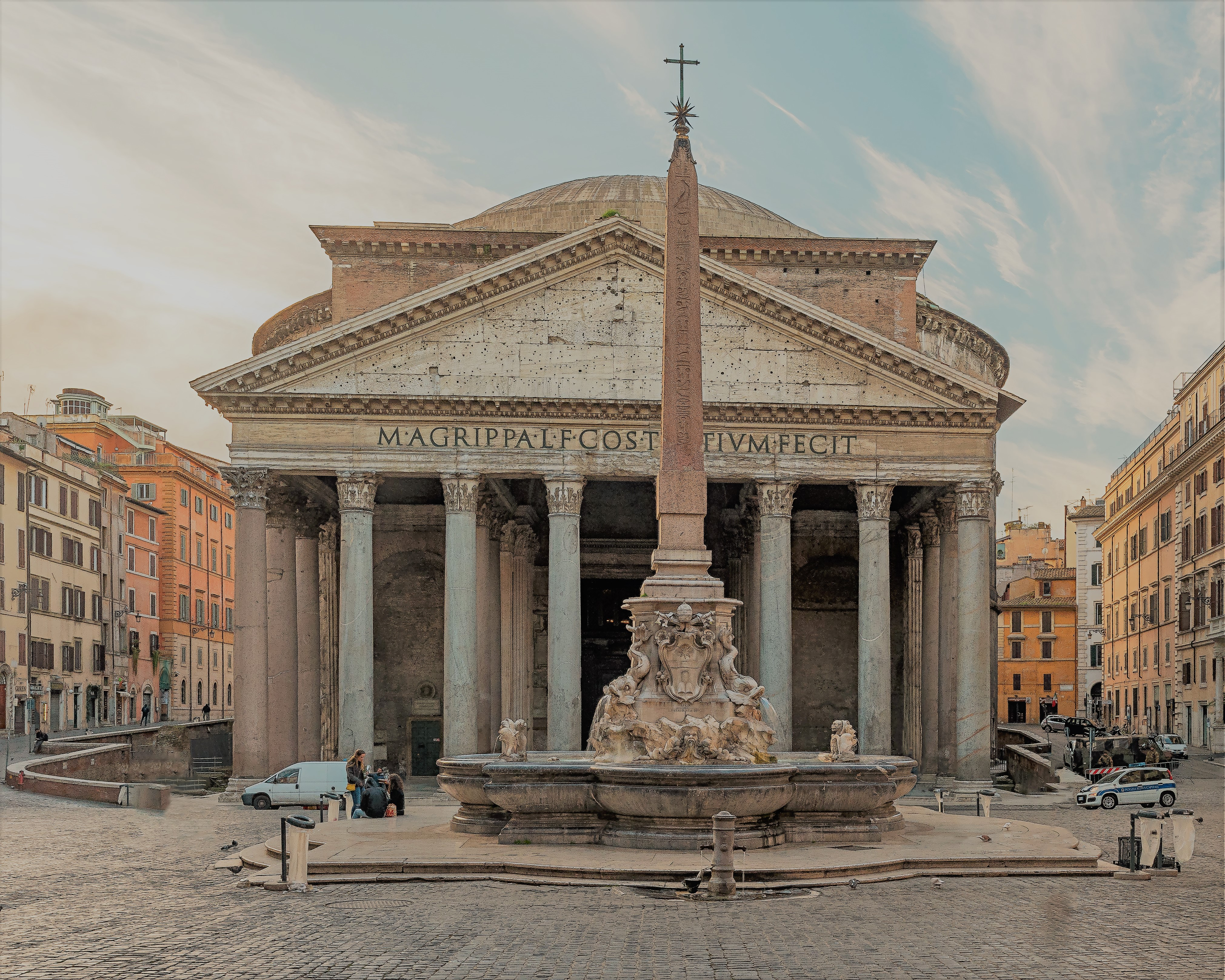
The obelisk in front of the Pantheon

The Pantheon obelisk or Obelisco Macuteo is an Egyptian obelisk in Rome in Piazza della Rotonda in front of the Pantheon and erected over a fountain. It is one of the 13 obelisks in Rome and one of relatively few ancient monoliths. It is 6.34 metres (20.8 ft) high, 14.52 metres (47.6 ft) including its base.

== Description ==
In the pyramidion—the tip of the obelisk—there are two name cartouches of Pharaoh Ramses II. However, the 6.34-metre-high (20.8 ft) obelisk was also considered a work of the Roman period such as the obelisk in Piazza Navona. It stood in antiquity in Emperor Domitian's sanctuary of Isis; that is, in the immediate vicinity of the Pantheon.

The obelisk forms a pair with the granite stump Obelisco Matteiano in the Villa Celimontana; together, they once stood in the sanctuary of Amun-Re in Heliopolis.^{[1]}

== Modern history ==
It was excavated in 1373 or 1575, and first placed in the Piazza di San Macuto, adjacent to Sant'Ignazio.

In 1711 Pope Clement XI had it set up on a late Baroque fountain in front of the Pantheon. This is recalled by an inscription on the basis of the obelisk: "Clemens XI pont(ifex) max(imus) fontis et fori ornamento anno sal(utis) MDCCXI pontif(icatus) XI" ("Pope Clement XI. to the fountain and the square ornaments in the year of salvation 1711, his pontificate 11.").

== Gallery ==
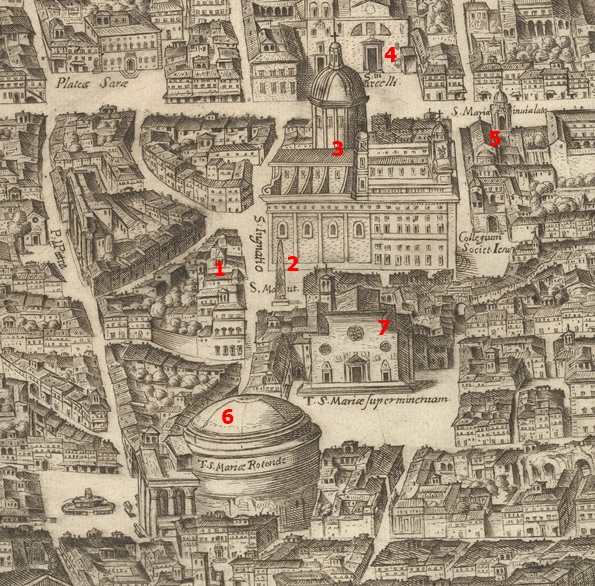
The obelisk in 1593

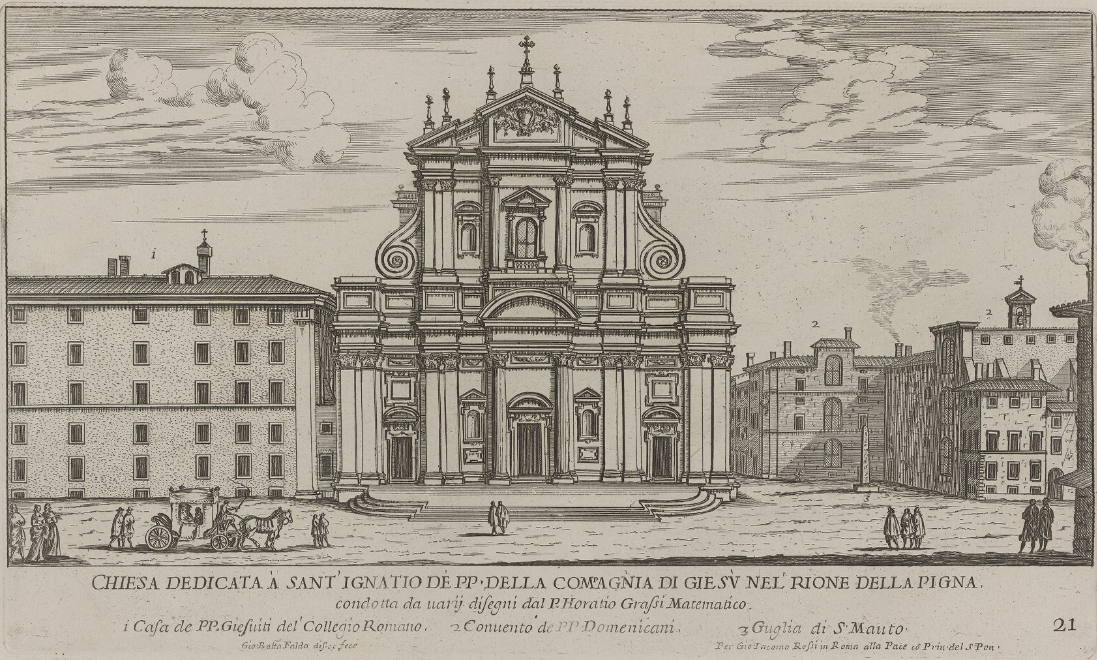
The obelisk in 1667–1669

== Literature ==
- Ernst Batta: Obelisken. Ägyptische Obelisken und ihre Geschichte in Rom. Insel, Frankfurt a. M. 1986, ISBN 3-458-32465-8 (Insel-Taschenbuch, 765).
- Richard Hillinger, Christian E. Loeben: Obelisken. Heliopolis, Luxor, Kairo, Byblos, Rom, Benevento, Istanbul, Urbino, Florenz, Kingston Lacy, München, Paris, Durham, London, New York, Berlin. Ausstellung im italienischen Saal der Landshuter Stadtresidenz vom 23. Mai bis 2. Juni 1992. Stadt Landshut, Landshut 1992, ISBN 3-927612-06-5.
- Reinhard Raffalt: Concerto Romano. Prestel, München 1955; 14. Ausg. 1999, ISBN 3-7913-2236-2.
- Eckart Peterich: Rom. 2. Auflage, Prestel, München 1998, ISBN 3-7913-2043-2.
- Samuel Ball Platner, Thomas Ashby: A Topographical Dictionary of Ancient Rome. Oxford University Press, London 1929, S. 366–371 (online).
- Cesare D’Onofrio: Gli obelischi di Roma. Storia e Urbanistica di una Città dall’Età antica al XX Secolo. 3. Auflage, Romana Societa Editrice, Rom 1992.
