= Colonna (rione of Rome) =

Coordinates: 41°50′N 12°45′E

- Rione of Rome
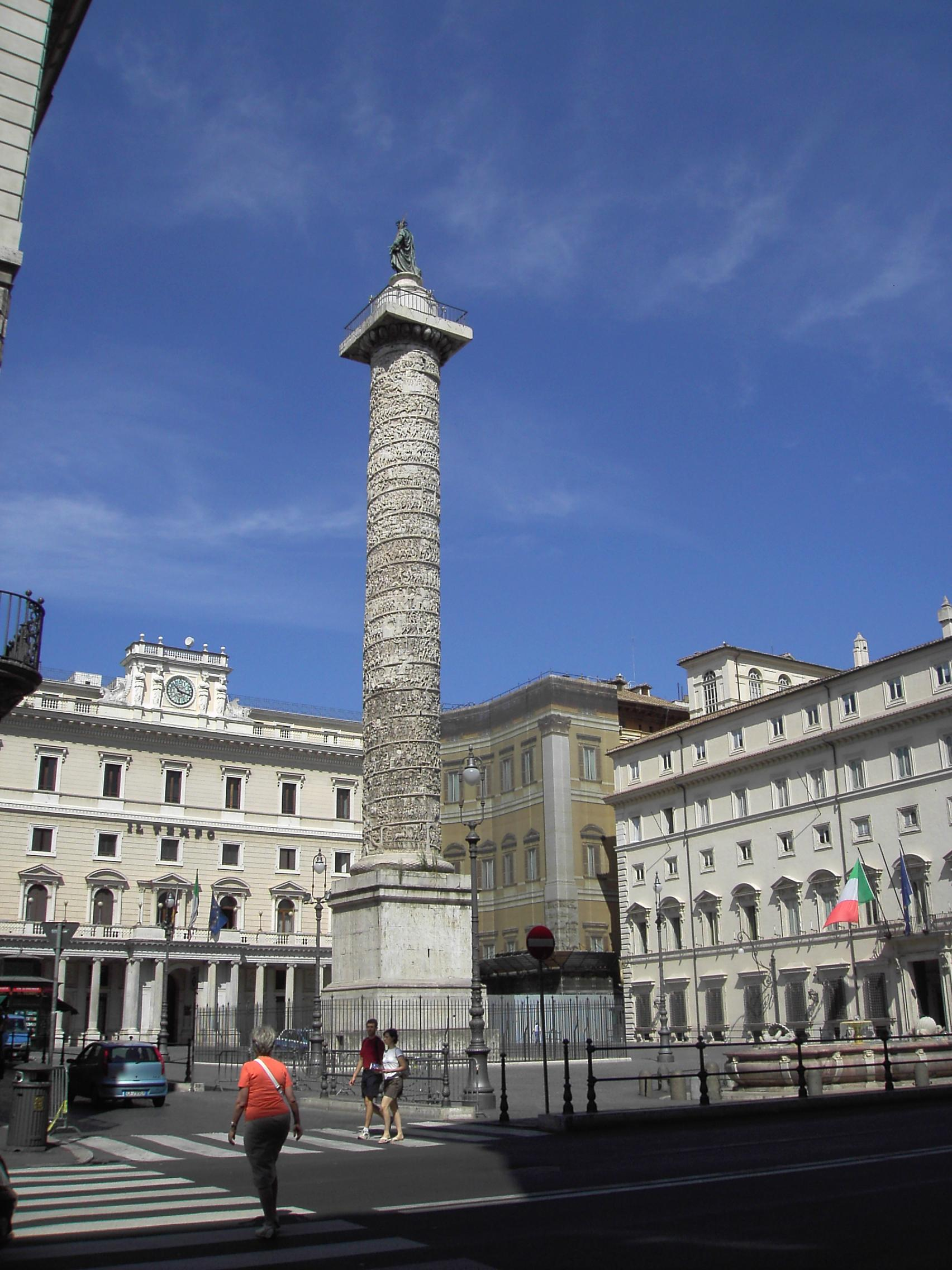
- Piazza Colonna and the Column of Marcus Aurelius, from which the rione takes its name

- Seal

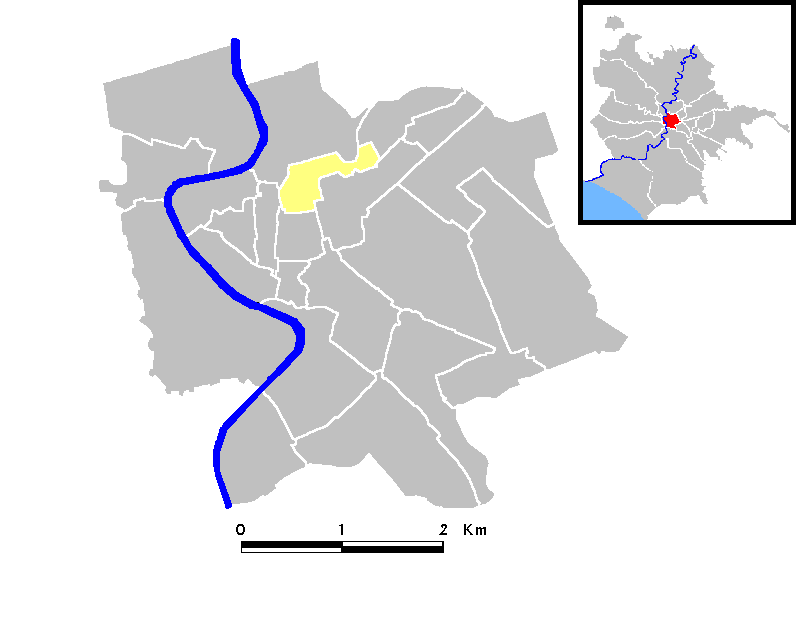
- Position of the rione within the center of the city
- Country: Italy
- Region: Lazio
- Province: Rome
- Comune: Rome
- Time zone: UTC+1 (CET)
  - Summer (DST): UTC+2 (CEST)

Colonna is the 3rd rione of Rome, Italy, identified by the initials R. III and located at the city's historic center in Municipio I. It takes its name from the Column of Marcus Aurelius in the Piazza Colonna, the rione's main square.

The rione's coat of arms is a now a silver column, representing the Column of Marcus Aurelius, on a red background. However, the insignia originally consisted of three azure bands against a silver background.

== History ==
The area of the rione is split up in two parts, divided by Via del Corso, a western flat part and an eastern hilly part, that reaches to one side of the Pincian Hill. During the short-lived Roman Republic of 1798 it also included the hill itself and was called Pincio rather than Colonna.

In ancient Rome, in the hilly part the richest patricians had their sumptuous domus, while the flat region used to belong to the Campus Martius and was studded with monuments: in addition to the Column of Marcus Aurelius, from which the rione takes its name, also the Temple of Hadrian and the Solarium Augusti were located in the area.

In the 16th century the rione experienced a remarkable development, as Pope Alexander VII refurbished Piazza Colonna and his family bought from the Aldobrandini family the palace that overlooked it. The relevance of Colonna increased further in 1696, after the Palazzo Montecitorio was chosen as the headquarter of the pontifical police and as the seat of the papal courthouse and of the customs house.

Following the unification of Italy and the proclamation of Rome as the capital of the new State, the northwestern part of the rione – hilly and packed with villas and parks – experienced a real "construction fever" as a huge number of new buildings were constructed to satisfy the demands related to the new role of the city. Eventually, in 1921 this area was detached from Colonna to constitute a new rione, Ludovisi.

Today the rione covers an area of 0.2689 km^{2} (0.1038 mi^{2}) and as of 2011 had 2,547 inhabitants.

== Geography ==
The rione borders to the north with Campo Marzio (R. IV), from which is separated by Via di Campo Marzio, Piazza di San Lorenzo in Lucina, Via Frattina, Via dei Due Macelli, Via Capo le Case and Via Francesco Crispi; and with Ludovisi (R. XVI), with Via degli Artisti, Via di Sant'Isidoro and Via Vittorio Veneto marking the boundary.

To the east, the rione borders with Trevi (R. II), whose boundary is marked by Piazza Barberini, Via del Tritone, Via del Nazareno, Largo del Nazareno, Via del Bufalo, Via del Pozzetto, Largo San Claudio, Via di Santa Maria in Via, Via delle Muratte and Via del Corso.

Southward, Colonna borders with Pigna (R. IX), which is separated by Via del Caravita, Piazza di Sant'Ignazio, Via del Seminario and Piazza della Rotonda.

Westward, the rione borders with Sant'Eustachio (R. VIII), whose boundary is defined by Piazza della Rotonda, Via del Pantheon, Piazza della Maddalena and Via della Maddalena.

== Places of interest ==
=== Churches ===
- Sant'Andrea delle Fratte
- San Lorenzo in Lucina
- Santa Maria in Aquiro
- San Macuto

=== Palaces and other buildings ===
- Almo Collegio Capranica
- Galleria Alberto Sordi (previously called the Galleria Colonna)
- Palazzo Chigi
- Palazzo Gabrielli-Borromeo
- Palazzo Montecitorio
- Palazzo Wedekind
- Temple of Hadrian (now the site of the Rome Stock Exchange)
- Teatro Capranica

=== Piazzas ===
- Piazza Colonna
- Piazza della Rotonda
- Piazza di Montecitorio
- Piazza del Parlamento
- Piazza San Silvestro

=== Roads ===
- Via del Corso
- Via Vittorio Veneto
- Via Frattina
- Via Sistina
