= Saint-Maclou =

- Commune
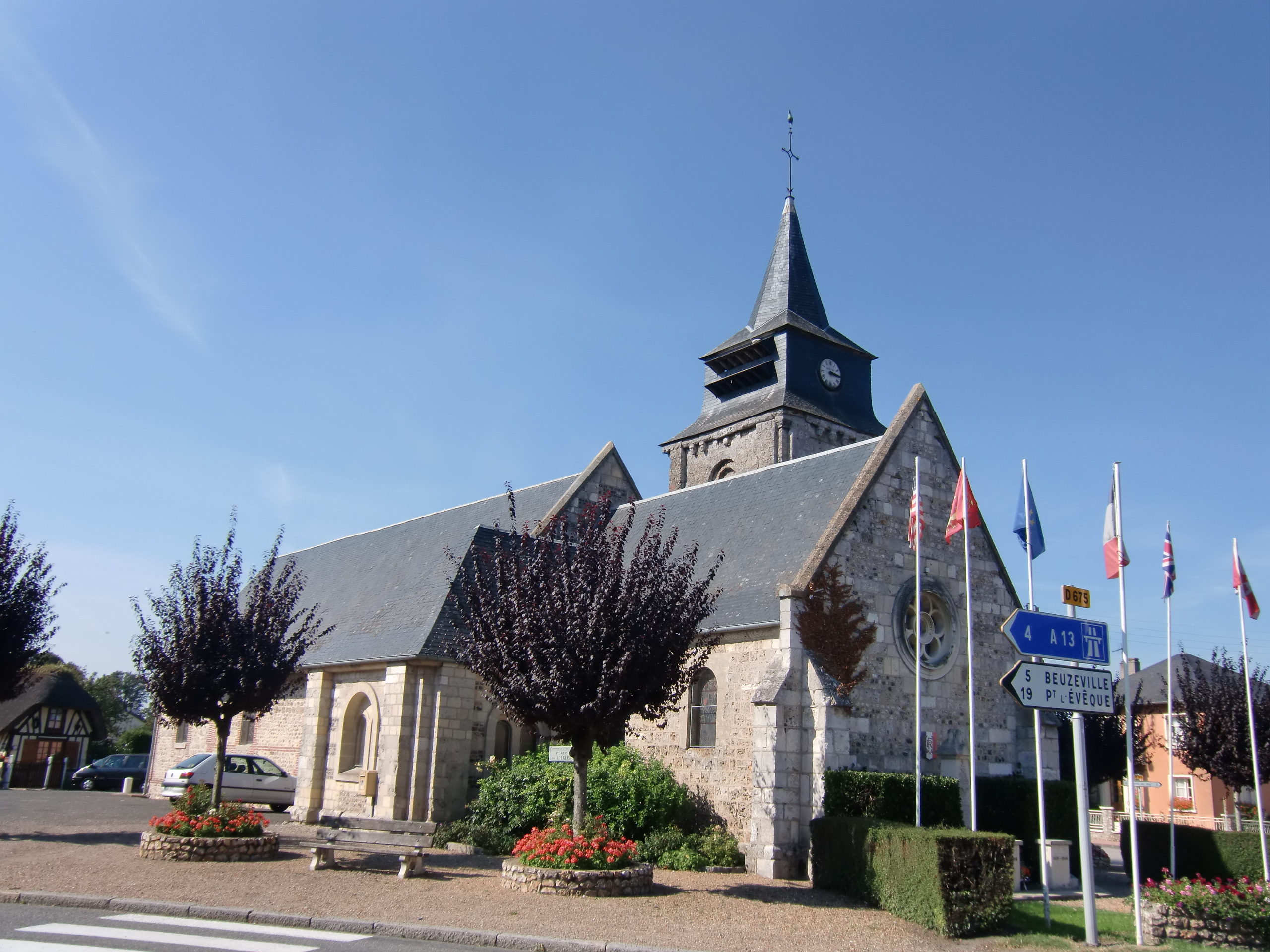
- The church in Saint-Maclou
- Location of Saint-Maclou
- Location within France Location within Normandy
- Coordinates: 49°21′56″N 0°24′40″E
- Country: France
- Region: Normandy
- Department: Eure
- Arrondissement: Bernay
- Canton: Beuzeville

Government
  - Mayor (2020–2026): Gérard Douvenou
- Area^{1}: 5.56 km^{2} (2.15 sq mi)
- Elevation: 114 m (374 ft)
- Highest elevation: 127 m (417 ft)
- Lowest elevation: 32 m (105 ft)
- Population (2023): 680
  - Density: 120/km^{2} (320/sq mi)
- Time zone: UTC+01:00 (CET)
  - Summer (DST): UTC+02:00 (CEST)
- INSEE/Postal code: 27561 /27210
- ^{1} French Land Register data, which excludes lakes, ponds, glaciers > 1 km^{2} (0.386 sq mi or 247 acres) and river estuaries.

Saint-Maclou is a commune in the Eure department in Normandy in northern France.

It has two chateaux within its boundaries: the chateau de St Maclou-la-Campagne just outside the village, and the Chateau du Mont. The name comes from Maclovius, the Latin name for a monk of Welsh origin who also gave his name to Saint-Malo, a much larger city in Brittany.

== Population ==
Historical population
Year	Pop.	±% p.a.
1968	276	—
1975	295	+0.96%
1982	416	+5.03%
1990	458	+1.21%
1999	463	+0.12%
2007	542	+1.99%
2012	581	+1.40%
2017	627	+1.54%
2023	680	+1.36%
Source: INSEE

== See also ==
- Communes of the Eure department
