= Palazzo Borromeo d'Adda =

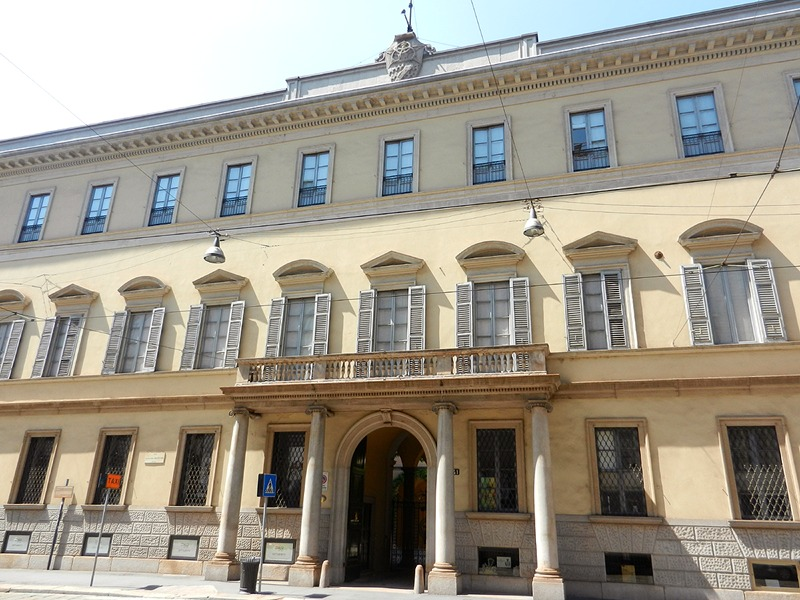
- The building's long façade on Via Manzoni
- Interactive map of the Palazzo Borromeo d'Adda area

General information
- Status: In use
- Type: Palace
- Architectural style: Neoclassical
- Location: Milan, Italy, 39/41, via Manzoni
- Coordinates: 45.471437°N 9.19373°E
- Construction started: 18th century
- Renovated: 19th century

Design and construction
- Architect: Girolamo Arganini (remake)

Palazzo Borromeo D’Adda, is an 18th-century palace in Milan, Italy. Historically belonging to the sestiere di Porta Nuova, it is located at via Manzoni no. 39/41.

== History and description ==
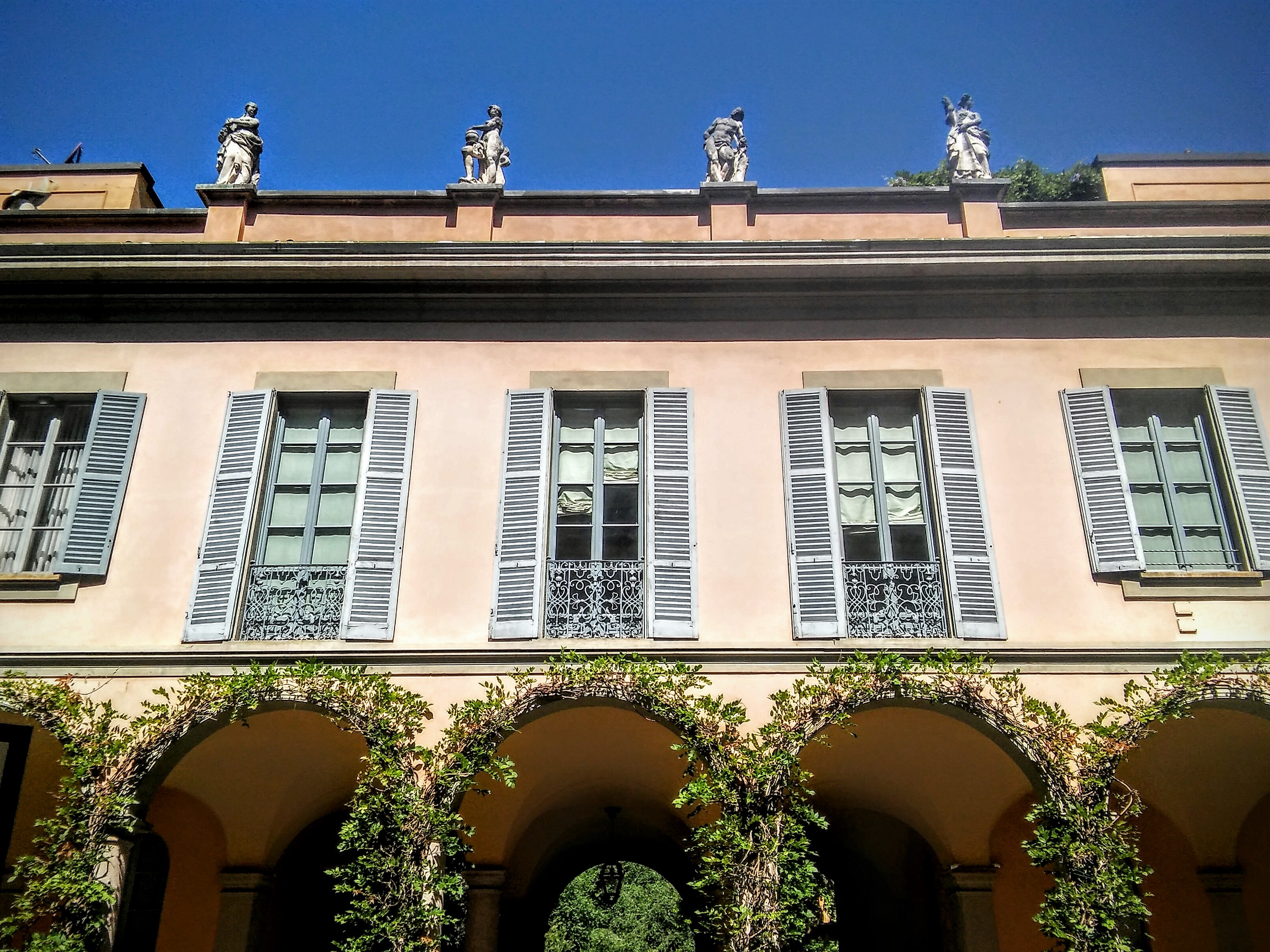
Courtyard

The palace that already existed in the 18th century was rebuilt in Neoclassical forms from 1820 on commission of Marquis Febo d’Adda, a well-known patron of the times, who entrusted the project to Girolamo Arganini. The architect chose a late Neoclassical look for the façade and set it up with three portals, of which the central major one is decorated with double columns in Ionic Order style in Ionic Order in pink granite, supporting the balcony on the piano nobile.

The twenty-five windows of the piano nobile are decorated with alternating triangular and curvilinear tympanums; the palace ends vertically with a cornice with corbels, surmounted by an attic at the centre of which is the family coat of arms. The interior of the palace has two courtyards, one of which is laid out as a garden; finally, worthy of note is the monumental staircase marked by barrel vault and pilasters ionic order architravate.

The palace is accurately described in his chronicles by Stendhal, who was fascinated by it and had his first 'thunderbolt' with the architecture: 'I entered a magnificent court. I got off my horse in amazement and admiring everything. I went up a superb flight of steps [...]. I was fascinated, it was the first time architecture had this effect on me'.
