= Palazzo Gabrielli-Borromeo =

Coordinates: 41°53′57″N 12°28′44″E

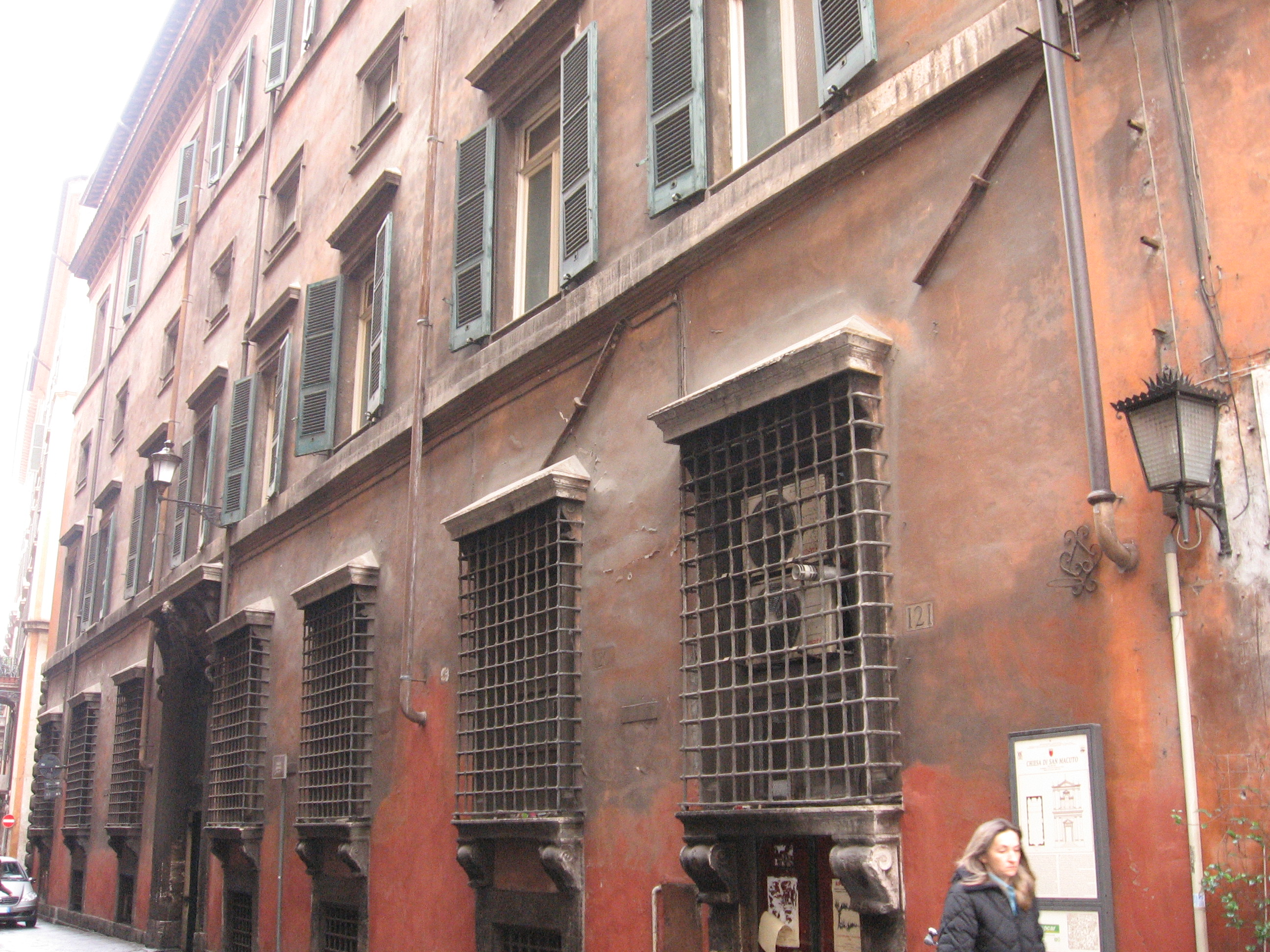
- Palazzo Gabrielli-Borromeo
- Interactive map of the Palazzo Gabrielli-Borromeo area

General information
- Location: Rome, Italy

The Palazzo Gabrielli-Borromeo is a palazzo in Rome, Italy. It is located in Via del Seminario, between Piazza di Sant'Ignazio and the Pantheon in the ancient Campus Martius and in the second sector of the present-day Colonna rione, not far from Via del Corso.

The first palazzo on the site was built by the Gabrielli family, counts of Gubbio, while its second name derives from its rebuilding and redecoration by Cardinal Vitaliano Borromeo for use by the Jesuits. In 1605 the Jesuits paid 20,000 scudi for the palace to use it as a seminary. The Jesuit order was suppressed during the papacy of Clement XIV. In 1774 the Monte di Pietà of Rome purchased the palace for 32,000 scudi. In 1796 it was given to the Fabbrica di San Pietro; however, by 1824 it had been returned to the Jesuit order.

During the 19th century the palace changed hands a number of times. Since 1853 it has been attached to Roman Catholic colleges in the city; since 1930 it has been the site of the postgraduate institution for Jesuits, the Collegio Bellarmino. The church of San Macuto is accessed from the courtyard.

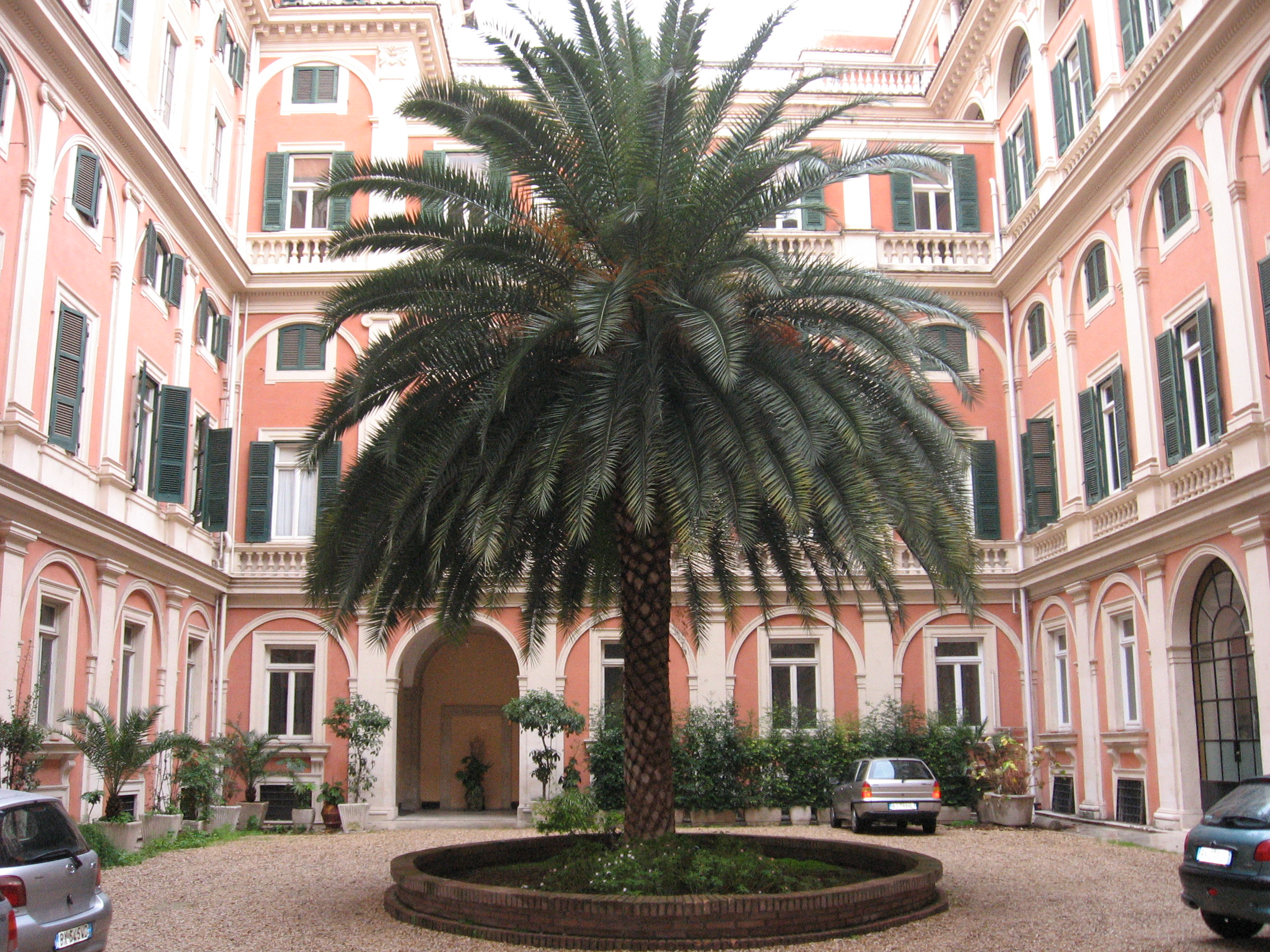
Courtyard

== See also ==
- List of Jesuit sites

== Bibliography ==
- Guide rionali di Roma. Rione III- Colonna. Parte II., a cura di Carlo Pietrangeli, Fratelli Palombi Editori, Rome, 1982.
- L'inaugurazione della nuova sede, Pontificia Università Gregoriana, Rome, 1930.
- L'Università Gregoriana del Collegio romano nel primo secolo dalla restituzione. Tipografia Cuggiani, Rome.
- Derived from Italian Wikipedia entry.
