= Pigna (rione of Rome) =

Administrative district of Rome, Italy

Coordinates: 41°54′N 12°29′E

- Rione of Rome
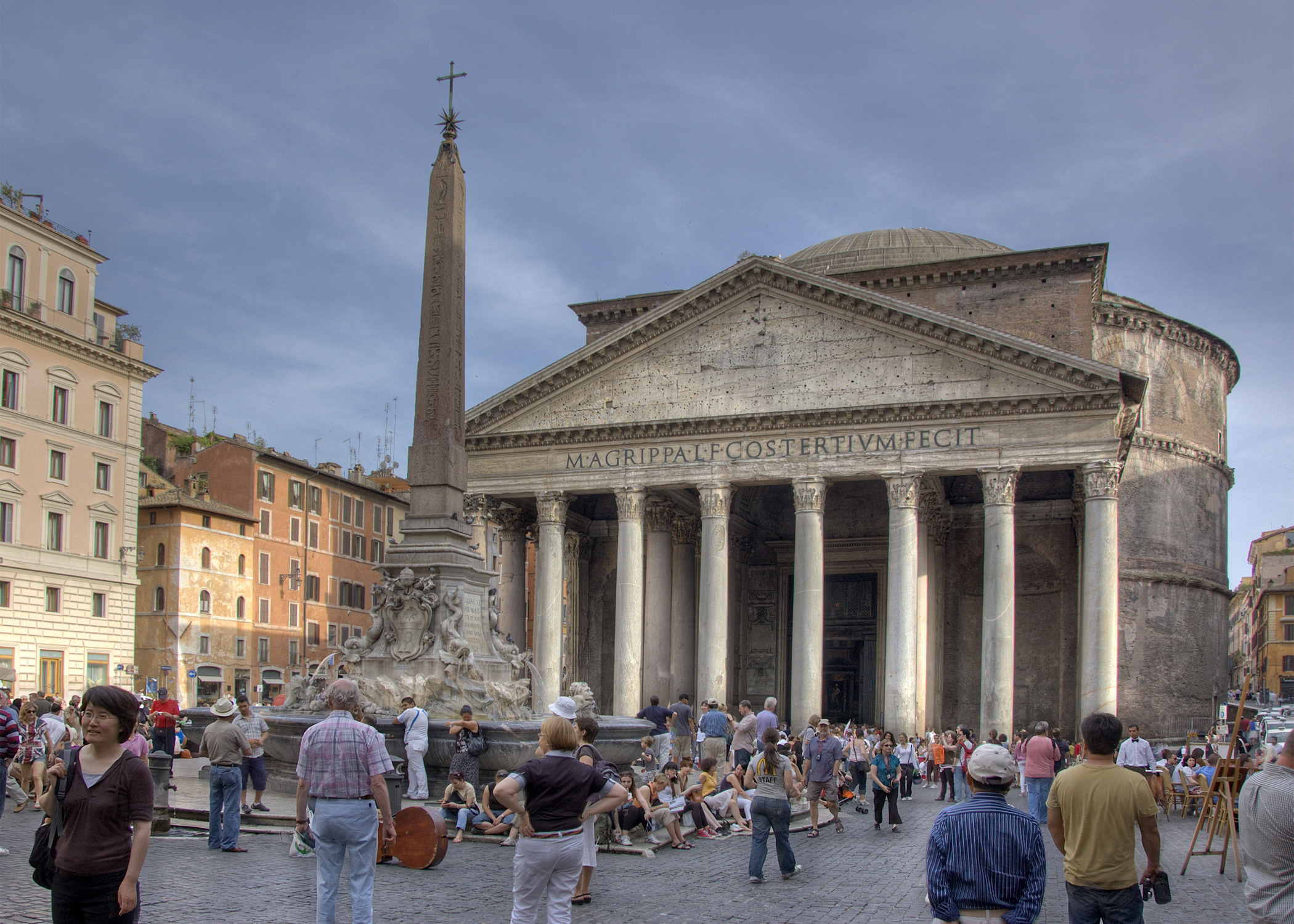
- The Pantheon

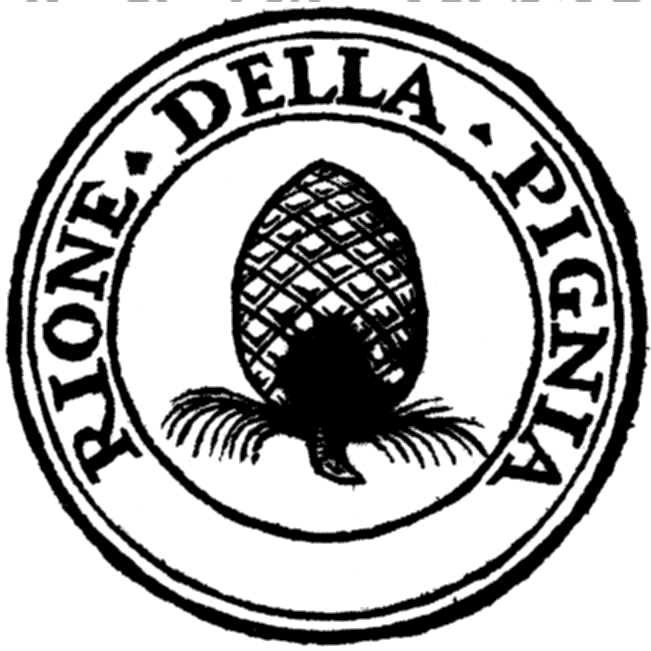
- Seal

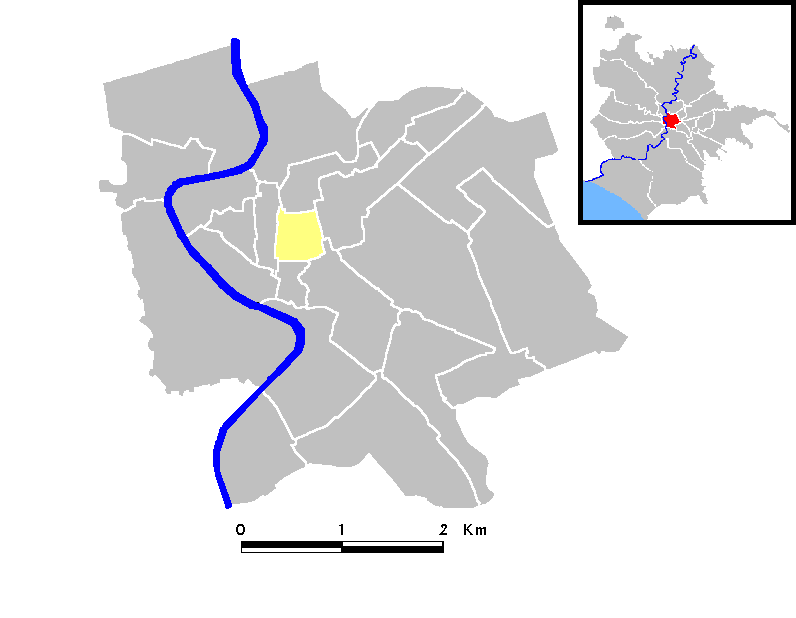
- Position of the rione within the center of the city
- Country: Italy
- Region: Lazio
- Province: Rome
- Comune: Rome
- Time zone: UTC+1 (CET)
  - Summer (DST): UTC+2 (CEST)

Pigna (Italian: [ˈpiɲɲa]) is the 9th rione (traditional administrative area) of Rome, Italy, identified as "R. IX", and belongs to Municipio I. The name means "pine cone" in Italian, and the symbol of the rione is the colossal bronze pine cone standing in the middle of the homonymous fountain. The fountain, which was initially located in the Baths of Agrippa, now decorates a vast niche in the wall of the Vatican facing the Cortile della Pigna, located in Vatican City.

== History ==
In the Roman period, the giant bronze pigna that gives the name to the rione once decorated a fountain and the water flowed copiously from the top of the pine cone.

The Pigna was moved first to the Old Basilica of Saint Peter, where Dante saw it and employed it in the Divina Commedia as a simile for the giant proportions of the face of Nimrod. In the 15th century it was moved to its current location, the upper end of Bramante's Cortile del Belvedere, which is now usually called in its honour the Cortile della Pigna, linking the Vatican and the Palazzo del Belvedere. There it stands today under Pirro Ligorio's vast niche at the far end, flanked by a pair of Roman bronze peacocks brought from Hadrian's mausoleum, the Castel Sant'Angelo.

Currently, a fountain with a travertine pine cone stands in front of San Marco Evangelista al Campidoglio: the fountain was commissioned by the Municipality to the architect Pietro Lombardi in order to reinstate the emblem of the rione.

== Geography ==
=== Boundaries ===
To the north, the rione borders with Colonna (R. III), whose border is outlined by Piazza della Rotonda, Via del Seminario, Piazza di Sant'Ignazio and Via del Caravita.

Eastward, it borders with Trevi (R. II), from which is separated by Via del Corso and Piazza Venezia.

To the south, Pigna it is separated from Campitelli (R. X) by Piazza Venezia, Largo Enrico Berlinguer and Via di San Marco; it is separated from Sant'Angelo (R. XI) by Via delle Botteghe Oscure and Via Florida.

Westward, the rione borders with Sant'Eustachio (R. VIII), the border being marked by Via di Torre Argentina, Largo di Santa Chiara and Via della Rotonda.

== Places of interest ==
=== Palaces and other buildings ===
- Collegio Romano, in Via del Collegio Romano.
- Palazzo Altieri, in Piazza del Gesù.
- Palazzo Besso, in Largo di Torre Argentina.
- Palazzo De Carolis, in Via del Corso.
- Palazzo Ginnasi, in Largo Santa Lucia Filippini.
- Palazzo Grazioli, in Via del Plebiscito.
- Palazzo Bonaparte, in Pigna.
- Palazzo Maffei Marescotti, in Via dei Cestari.
- Palazzo San Macuto, in Piazza di San Macuto.
- Palazzo Venezia, between Piazza Venezia and Via del Plebiscito.
- Palazzo Verospi Vitelleschi, in Via del Corso.

=== Churches ===
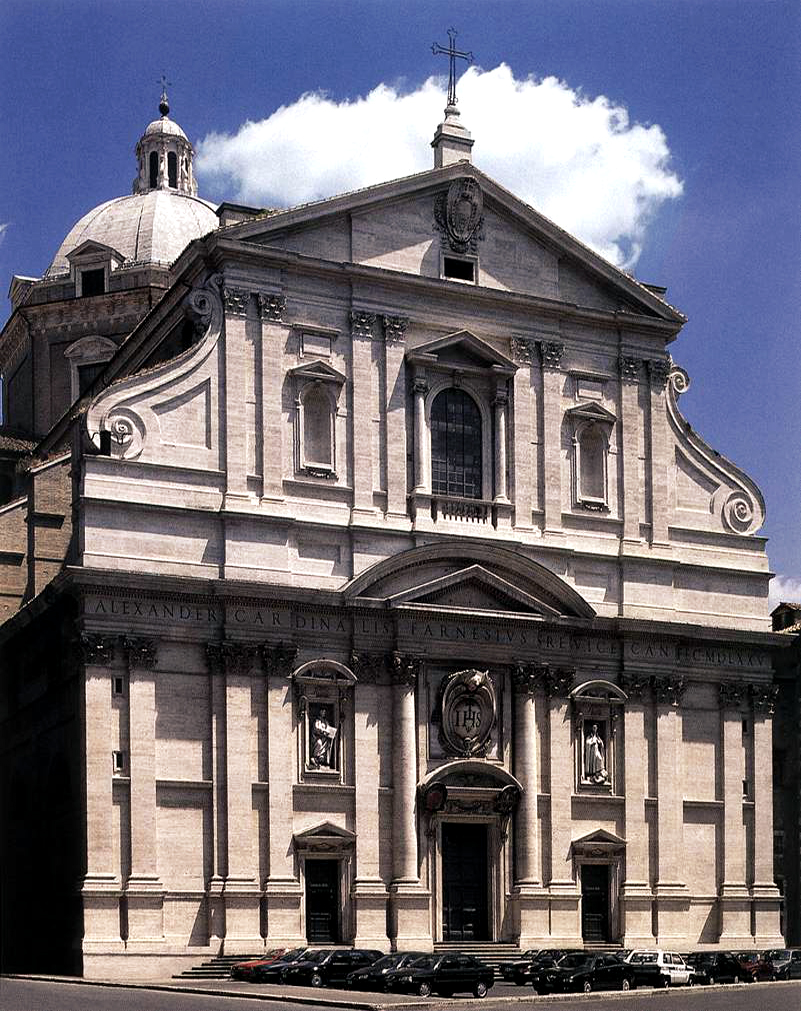
The Church of the Gesù

- Pantheon (Santa Maria ad Martyres), in Piazza della Rotonda.
- Church of the Gesù, in Piazza del Gesù.
- Sant'Ignazio di Loyola in Campo Marzio, in Via del Caravita.
- San Marco Evangelista al Campidoglio, in Piazza Venezia.
- Santo Stefano del Cacco, in Via Santo Stefano del Cacco.
- Santa Chiara, in Piazza Santa Chiara.
- San Giovanni della Pigna, in Piazza della Pigna.
- Santa Maria in Via Lata, in Via del Corso.
- Santa Maria sopra Minerva, in Piazza della Minerva.
- Santissime Stimmate di San Francesco, in Via dei Cestari.
- Oratory of San Francesco Saverio del Caravita, in Via del Caravita.

=== Squares ===
- Piazza della Minerva
- Piazza della Rotonda
- Largo di Torre Argentina
- Piazza Venezia

== See also ==
- Fontana della Pigna
