= Saint-Savinien =

- Commune
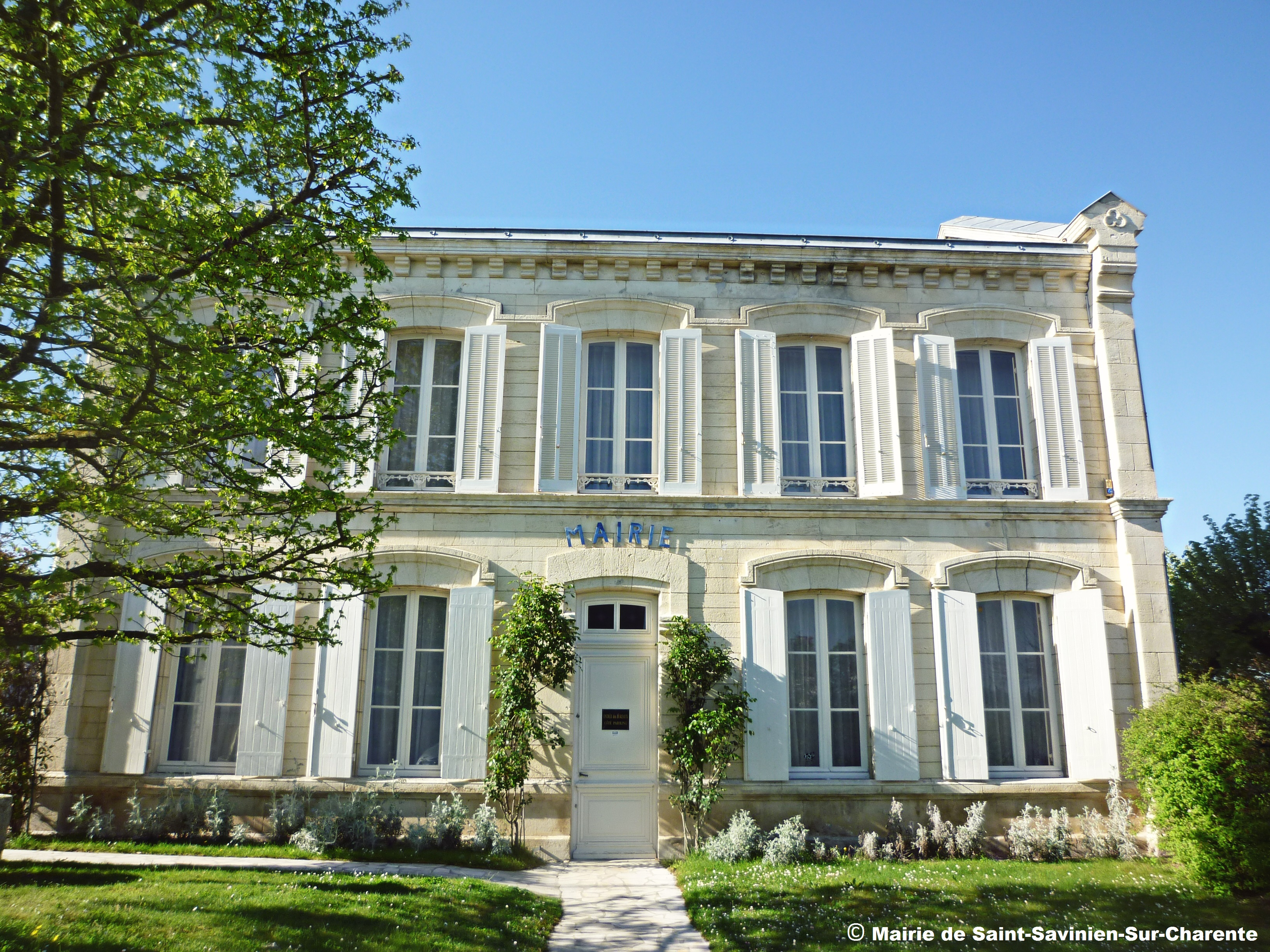
- The town hall in Saint-Savinien

- Coat of arms
- Location of Saint-Savinien
- Location within France Location within Nouvelle-Aquitaine
- Coordinates: 45°53′55″N 0°47′13″W
- Country: France
- Region: Nouvelle-Aquitaine
- Department: Charente-Maritime
- Arrondissement: Saint-Jean-d'Angély
- Canton: Saint-Jean-d'Angély

Government
  - Mayor (2020–2026): Jean-Claude Godineau
- Area^{1}: 47 km^{2} (18 sq mi)
- Elevation: 6 m (20 ft)
- Highest elevation: 68 m (223 ft)
- Lowest elevation: 0 m (0 ft)
- Population (2023): 2,460
  - Density: 52/km^{2} (140/sq mi)
- Time zone: UTC+01:00 (CET)
  - Summer (DST): UTC+02:00 (CEST)
- INSEE/Postal code: 17397 /17350
- ^{1} French Land Register data, which excludes lakes, ponds, glaciers > 1 km^{2} (0.386 sq mi or 247 acres) and river estuaries.

Saint-Savinien (French pronunciation: [sɛ̃ savinjɛ̃]) is a commune in the Charente-Maritime department in the Nouvelle-Aquitaine region in southwestern France.

== Population ==
Historical population
Year	Pop.	±% p.a.
1968	2,377	—
1975	2,342	−0.21%
1982	2,336	−0.04%
1990	2,340	+0.02%
1999	2,359	+0.09%
2007	2,372	+0.07%
2012	2,456	+0.70%
2017	2,433	−0.19%
2023	2,460	+0.18%
Source: INSEE

== History ==
Saint-Savinien-sur-Charente is one of the most picturesque communes in Roman Saintonge. It dates back to the Roman times.

Following the Edict of Fontainebleau in 1685, numerous Protestants stayed in Saint-Savinien. In 1717, Claude Masse reported "There is considerable commerce in this place, the large barques constantly coming up as far as Saint-Savinien. There are also many good merchants, but they are for the most part Protestants.”

== Sights ==
- Château de la Cave

== See also ==
- Communes of the Charente-Maritime department
