= Piazza di San Macuto =

Piazza in Rome

Coordinates: 41.8990°N 12.4794°E

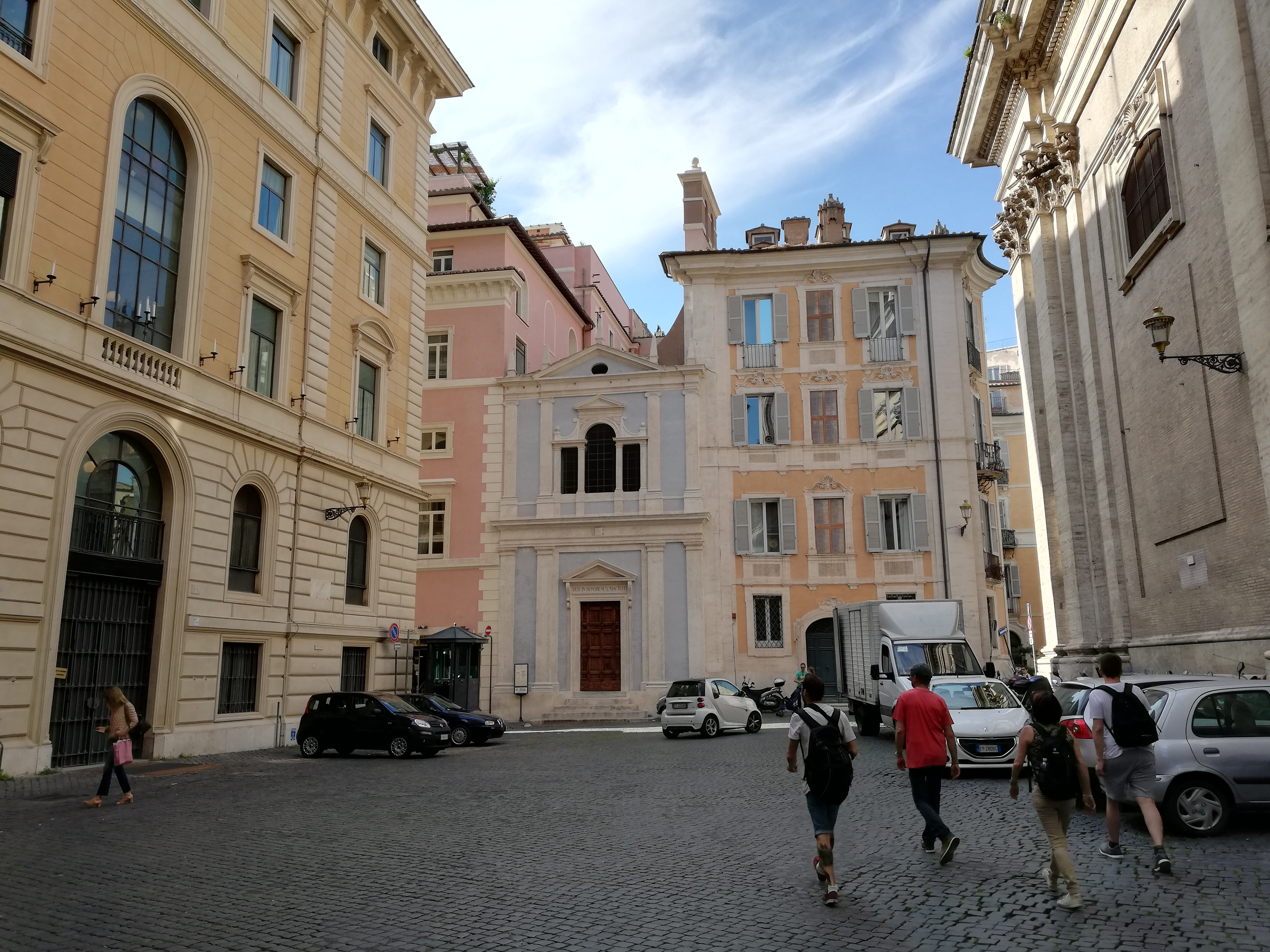
Piazza di San Macuto in 2018

Piazza di San Macuto is a small piazza in the Pigna rione of Rome, adjacent to the Sant'Ignazio, Rome. It contains the church of San Macuto. The Pantheon obelisk stood here for two centuries.
