= Piazza Pia =

- Piazza Pia in 2002, before its 2024 renovation

- Location within Italy
- Area: 7,200 m²
- Location: Rome, Italy
- Postal code: 00193
- Coordinates: 41.902398°N 12.464398°E

Other
- Known for: Near St. Peter's Basilica and Castel Sant'Angelo

Piazza Pia is a historic square located in the Borgo district of Rome, located between Castel Sant'Angelo and Via della Conciliazione. The square was renovated in 2024 as part of improvements relating to the 2025 Jubilee, with renovations completing on December 23, 2024.

== See also ==
- Castel Sant’Angelo
- Via della Conciliazione
- St. Peter’s Basilica
- Santa Maria Annunziata in Borgo
