= Bords =

- Commune
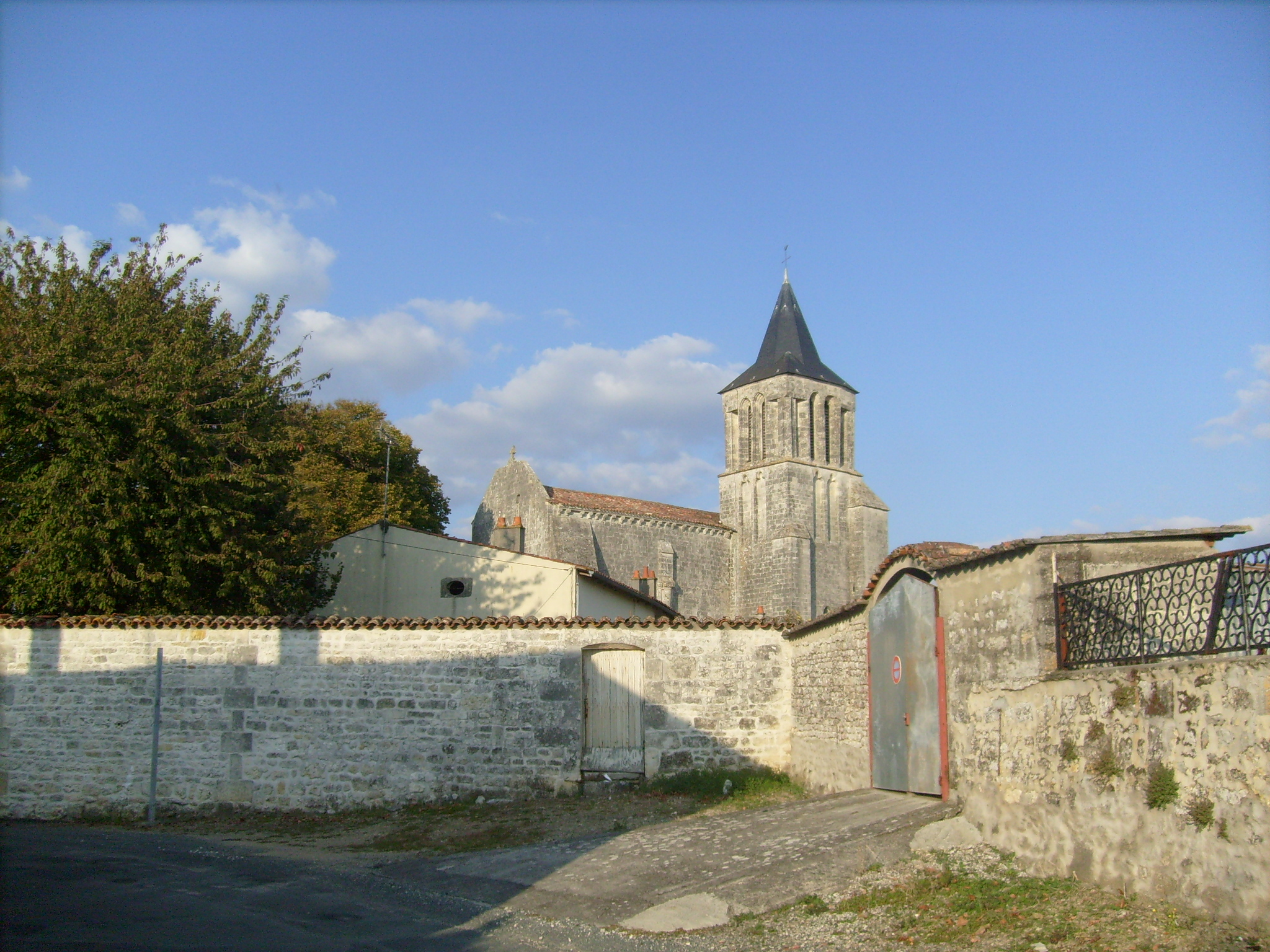
- The church in Bords
- Location of Bords
- Location within France Location within Nouvelle-Aquitaine
- Coordinates: 45°53′52″N 0°47′36″W
- Country: France
- Region: Nouvelle-Aquitaine
- Department: Charente-Maritime
- Arrondissement: Saint-Jean-d'Angély
- Canton: Saint-Jean-d'Angély

Government
  - Mayor (2023–2026): Bruno Boulestin
- Area^{1}: 15.47 km^{2} (5.97 sq mi)
- Elevation: 6 m (20 ft)
- Highest elevation: 57 m (187 ft)
- Lowest elevation: 0 m (0 ft)
- Population (2023): 1,375
  - Density: 88.88/km^{2} (230.2/sq mi)
- Time zone: UTC+01:00 (CET)
  - Summer (DST): UTC+02:00 (CEST)
- INSEE/Postal code: 17053 /17430
- ^{1} French Land Register data, which excludes lakes, ponds, glaciers > 1 km^{2} (0.386 sq mi or 247 acres) and river estuaries.

Bords (French pronunciation: [bɔʁ]) is a commune in the Charente-Maritime department in the Nouvelle-Aquitaine region in southwestern France.

== Population ==
Historical population
| Year | Pop. | ±% p.a. |
|---|---|---|
| 1968 | 1,007 | — |
| 1975 | 976 | −0.45% |
| 1982 | 1,111 | +1.87% |
| 1990 | 1,109 | −0.02% |
| 1999 | 1,122 | +0.13% |
| 2007 | 1,242 | +1.28% |
| 2012 | 1,318 | +1.19% |
| 2017 | 1,347 | +0.44% |
| 2023 | 1,375 | +0.34% |
Source: INSEE

== See also ==
- Communes of the Charente-Maritime department
