= Piazza della Rotonda =

Square in Rome

- City square
- {{{other_names}}}
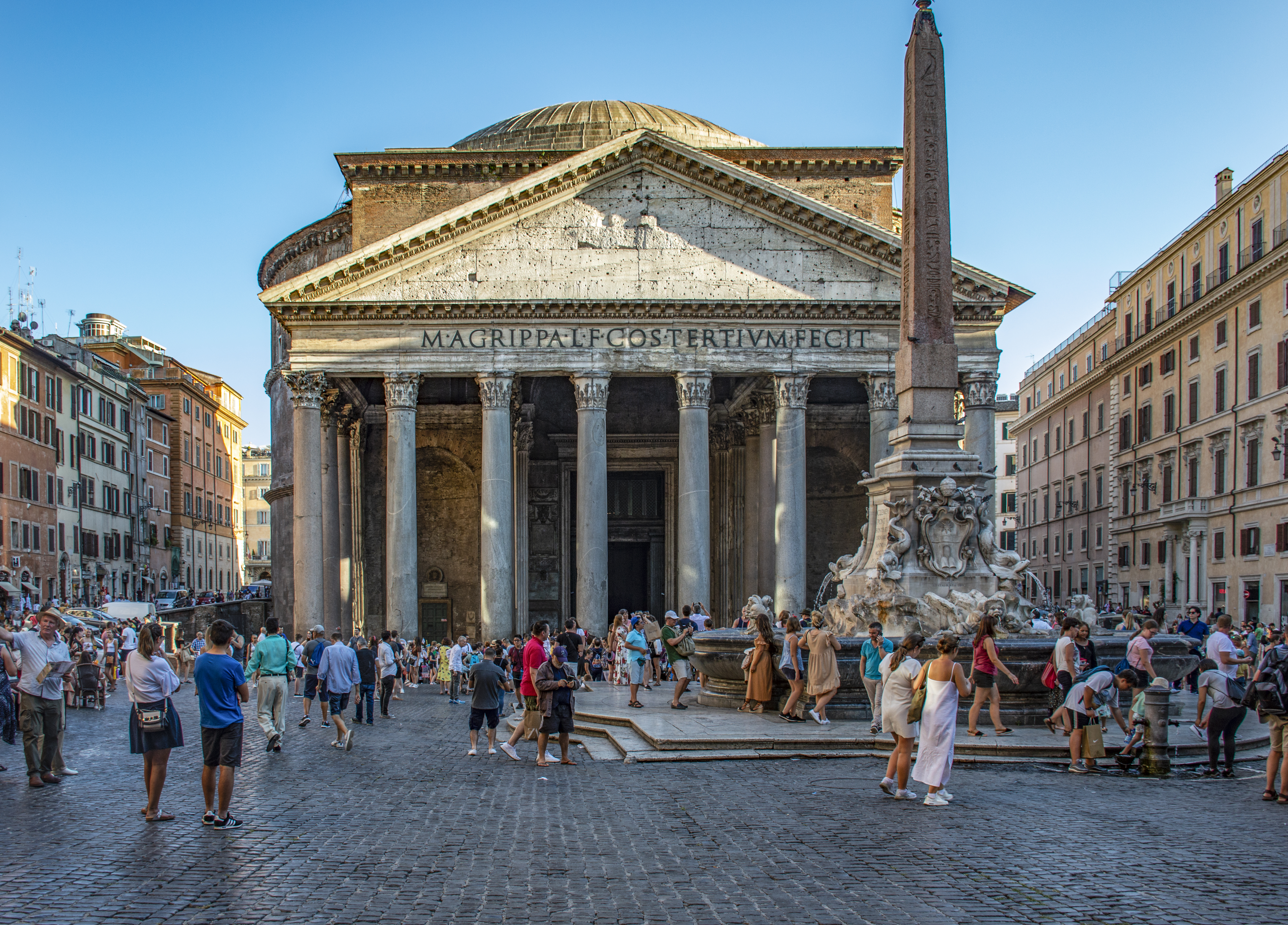
- Piazza della Rotonda seen from the north, showing the Pantheon and fountain with the Pantheon obelisk.
- Location: Rome, Italy
- Interactive map of Piazza della Rotonda
- Coordinates: 41°53′58″N 12°28′36″E

The Piazza della Rotonda is a piazza (city square) in Rome, Italy, on the south side of which is located the Pantheon. The square gets its name from the Pantheon's informal title as the church of Santa Maria Rotonda.

== History ==
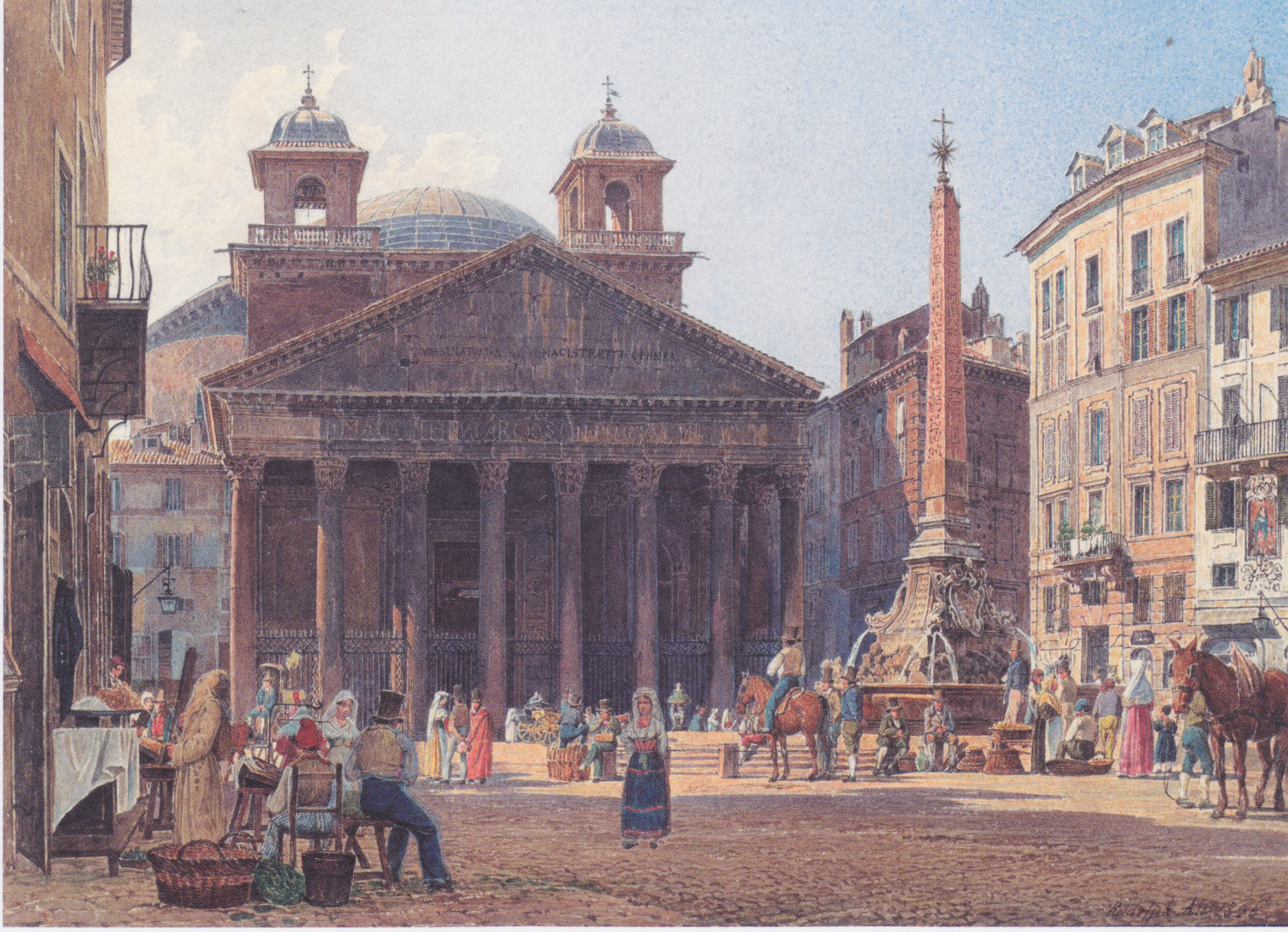
The piazza with obelisk and Pantheon's bell-towers in an 1835 watercolor by Rudolf von Alt.

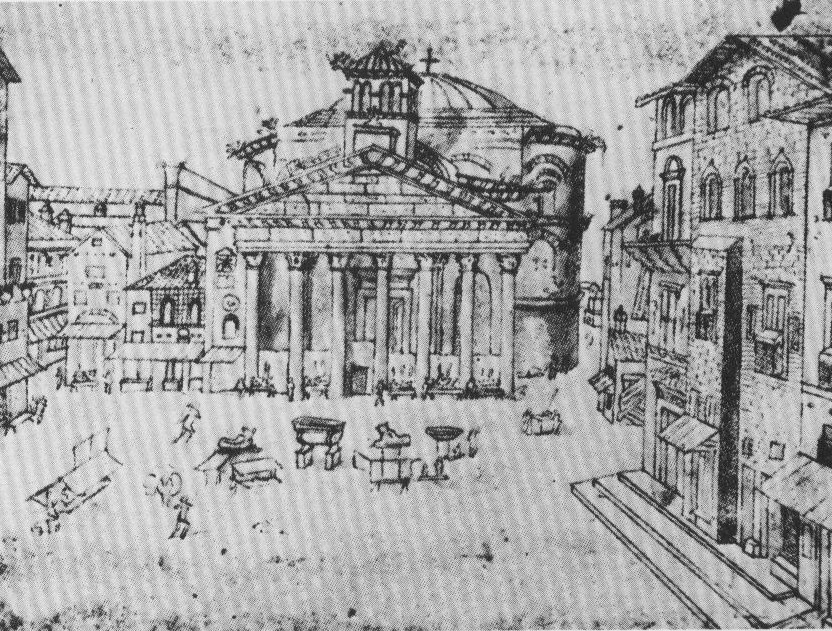
The piazza, fountain absent and houses built against the Pantheon, in a 15th-century ink manuscript illumination.

Although the Pantheon has stood from antiquity, the area in front of it had over the centuries become choked with a maze of sheds and small shops that had grown up around its columns. These medieval accretions were cleared by order of Pope Eugenius IV (1431–39) and the piazza was laid out and paved. It took its name from the Pantheon, which had been converted in the 7th century AD into a Christian church dedicated to "St. Mary and the Martyrs" but informally known as Santa Maria Rotonda. The piazza is roughly rectangular, approximately 60 meters north to south and 40 meters east to west, with a fountain and obelisk in the center and the Pantheon on the south side.

During the 19th century, the piazza was especially noted for its market of bird-sellers, who brought their cages with live parrots, nightingales, owls, and other birds into the piazza. A traveler in 1819 remarked that during Twelfth Night celebrations in Rome the Piazza della Rotonda was "in particular distinguished by the gay appearance of the fruit and cake-stalls, dressed with flowers and lighted with paper lanterns."

Charlotte Anne Eaton, an English traveller who visited in 1820, was much less impressed with the piazza and deplored how a visitor would find himself "surrounded by all that is most revolting to the senses, distracted by incessant uproar, pestered with a crowd of clamorous beggars, and stuck fast in the congregated filth of every description that covers the slippery pavement ... Nothing resembling such a hole as this could exist in England; nor is it possible that an English imagination can conceive a combination of such disgusting dirt, such filthy odours and foul puddles, such as that which fills the vegetable market in the Piazza della Rotonda at Rome." An 1879 Baedeker guidebook noted that the "busy scene" of the piazza "affords the stranger opportunities of observing the characteristics of the peasantry."

Its present appearance was threatened with destruction under the French administration of 1809–1814, when Napoleon signed decrees calling for the demolition of the buildings around the Pantheon. The short life of French rule in Rome meant that the scheme never went ahead but it re-emerged in an altered form in the urban plan of 1873. This scheme proposed that the piazza should be enlarged and made into the focus of new boulevards converging on it from the direction of Piazza Borghese and Largo Magnanapoli. In the event, this did not happen, though several structures adjoining the north end of the square and the Pantheon were demolished under Popes Pius VII and Pius IX.

== The fountain and obelisk ==
In the center of the piazza is a fountain, the Fontana del Pantheon, surmounted by an Egyptian obelisk. The fountain was constructed by Giacomo della Porta under Pope Gregory XIII in 1575, and the Pantheon obelisk was added to it in 1711 under Pope Clement XI.

The Aqua Virgo, one of the eleven aqueducts that supplied ancient Rome with drinking water, served the area of the Campus Martius, but had fallen into disrepair and disuse by the late Middle Ages. It was reconstructed under Pope Nicholas V and consecrated in 1453 as the Acqua Vergine. In 1570, Giacomo della Porta was commissioned under Pope Gregory XIII to oversee a major project to extend the distribution of water from the Vergine to eighteen new public fountains.

Construction of the fountain in the Piazza della Rotonda was authorized on September 25, together with a fountain for Piazza Colonna, and two more for Piazza Navona; the fountain for the Rotonda, completed in 1575, was of a chalice-type design, around 3.5 to 4 meters in height, and fed with the Vergine water through a terracotta conduit. Della Porta designed the fountain, and Leonardo Sormani executed it. Due to the slope of the piazza, the fountain is approached by five steps on the south side, and only two on the north.

Under the pontificate of Alexander VII Chigi, projects were set afoot to systematize the piazza and its setting, grading and enlarging it and widening the incident streets, in which Gian Lorenzo Bernini participated. An engraving by Giovanni Battista Falda records the work that had been completed at the time of Alexander's death in 1667.

In 1711, the fountain was given its current appearance when Pope Clement XI had the Late Baroque sculptor Filippo Barigioni top it with a 20-foot red marble Egyptian obelisk. The obelisk, originally constructed by Pharaoh Ramses II for the Temple of Ra in Heliopolis, had been brought to Rome in ancient times where it was reused in the Iseum Campense, a shrine to the Egyptian god Isis that stood to the southeast of the Pantheon. It was rediscovered in 1374 underneath the apse of the nearby Basilica of Santa Maria sopra Minerva. In the mid-15th century, the obelisk had been erected in the small Piazza di San Macuto some 200 meters east of the Pantheon, where it remained until its 1711 move to the Piazza della Rotonda. It is still called the Obelisco Macuteo after its previous location.

== See also ==
- List of fountains in Rome
- List of obelisks in Rome
