= Lungotevere Testaccio =

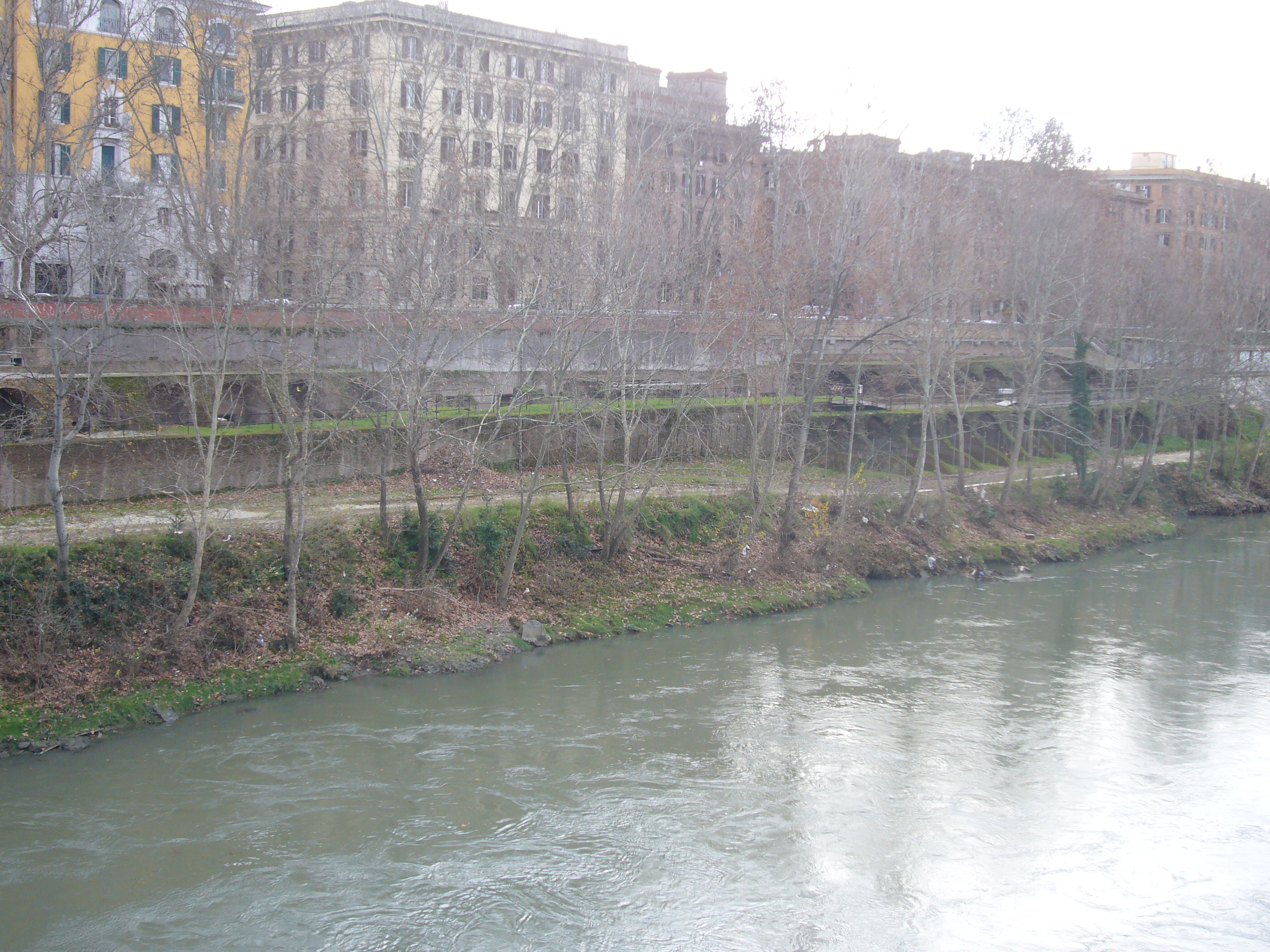
- Lungotevere Testaccio and excavations of Emporium
- Interactive map of Lungotevere Testaccio
- Namesake: Monte Testaccio
- Type: Lungotevere
- Location: Rome, Italy
- Quarter: Testaccio
- Coordinates: 41.8798°N 12.4735°E
- From: Piazza dell'Emporio (Ponte Sublicio)
- To: Largo Giovanni Battista Marzi (Ponte Testaccio)

Construction
- Inauguration: July 20, 1887

Lungotevere Testaccio is the stretch of lungotevere that connects piazza dell'Emporio with Largo Giovanni Battista Marzi (that is, between the ponte Sublicio and the ponte Testaccio), in Rome, in the Rione of the same name.

== History ==
The Lungotevere is named after the Monte Testaccio, a relief formed in ancient times by the accumulation of debris and shards (testae in Latin) from the nearby Emporium; it was established by resolution of 20 July 1887.

Below the current retaining wall there are the remains of the walls of the Emporium, which were, in the nineteenth century, excavated and paved and stripped of the marbles that had remained for centuries to under the mud of the Tiber.

To remember the excavations carried out by Pietro Ercole Visconti in this area, which allowed among other things to recover (and reuse) many ancient marbles, was erected by Pope Pius IX in 1869 a fountain made of a Roman sarcophagus used as a bath on which stands the memorial inscription:

PIUS IX PONT MAX EMPORII GRADIBUS / AD TIBERIM REPERTIS / MARMORUM EX ASIAE ET AFRICAE LAPIDICINIS / INGENTI COPIA QUAE DIU LATUERAT RECUPERATA / ET SACRAE URBIS SUAE ORNAMENTO REDDITA / RIPAM HANC / IN LONG PMM IN LAT PPM / XL MURO DUCTO TERMINAVIT PUBLICAVITQUE / ANNO S.P. XXIIII
Pius IX Pontifex Maximus, found tiers of marbles of Asia and Africa at the Emporio near the Tiber in large quantities, which had remained hidden for a long time, having them retrieved and returned to adorn his sacred city, built a wall palms 2000 long and 1,040 feet wide, delimited this bank and made it public. In the XXIII year of his pontificate.

With the construction of the last section of walls on the Tiber, in the 1920s, the fountain was reassembled by inserting it in the wall towards the river.

== Sources ==
- Rendina, Claudio; Paradisi, Donatella (2004). Le strade di Roma. Third volume P-Z. Rome: Newton Compton Editori. ISBN 88-541-0210-5.
