= Emporium (Rome) =

River port of the ancient Rome

- Emporium
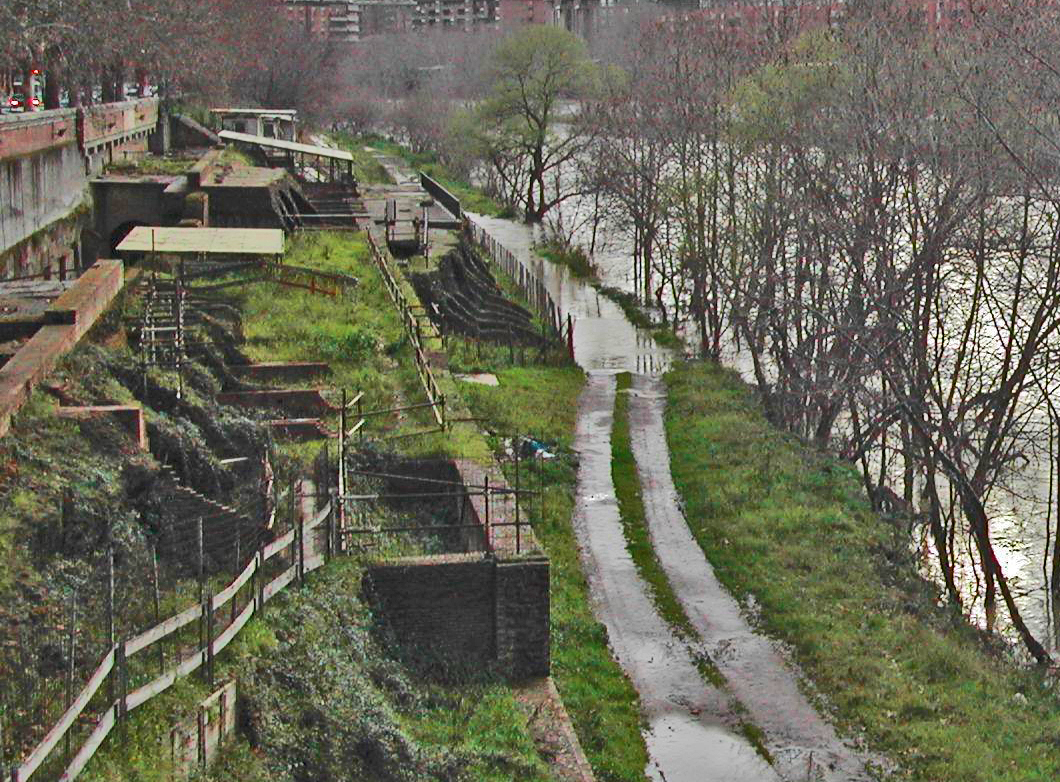
- Remains of the structures of the Emporium along the Tiber

- Location within Rome
- 41°52′27″N 12°28′18″E
- Type: River port
- Periods: Ancient Rome
- Location: Rome (Italy)

History
- Built: 2nd century BC

Site notes
- Excavation dates: 1868–1870

The Emporium was the river port of the ancient Rome, that rose approximately between the Aventine Hill and the Rione Testaccio (the Rione takes its name from the hill made of broken amphorae, originated by the wastes from the trade activities of the port).

== History ==
Since the beginning of the 2nd century BC, the impetuous economic and demographic development had made the former river port in the Forum Boarium totally inadequate: moreover, it could not be enlarged due to its vicinity to the hills. Therefore, in 193 BC the censors Lucius Aemilius Lepidus and Lucius Aemilius Paulus established to face the problem by building a new port within a free area on the border of the town, south of the Aventine Hill. On that occasion the Porticus Aemilia was also erected.

In 174 BC the Emporium was paved with stones and divided with walls and ladders descending to the Tiber. Here there was the docking place of the wares and raw materials (especially marbles, wheat, wine, oil); they reached the harbor of Ostia by sea and went up the river on barges pulled by buffaloes (towpath). During the centuries, the fragments of the amphorae (then used as containers for the handling of liquid foods), were clumped until they created the still-existing hill of shards: the ancient name of Mons Testaceum ("Hill of Shards") derived from it. The number of stacked-up amphorae is estimated to be about 25 million.

During the reign of Trajan, new opus mixtum structures were erected, while the plain of Testaccio was gradually filled with warehouses, especially for foodstuffs, with a huge hike when free distributions of wheat and other foodstuffs to citizens began to take place, starting from the age of Tiberius and Gaius Gracchus (Horrea Sempronia, Galbana, Lolliana, Seiana, Aniciana).

The port was first excavated in 1868–1870, during the damming works, and then in 1952. Now there are few visible stretches, bricked in the wall of Lungotevere Testaccio: a quay 500 metres (1,600 ft) long and 90 metres (300 ft) deep, with steps and ramps toward the river, with bulging travertine blocks having holes for ships mooring, very similar – though not so well preserved – to the one in the Roman port of Aquileia. During the building of modern Testaccio quarter, several remains of warehouses have come to light: among them, the tomb of the consul Servius Sulpicius Galba, one of the most ancient known individual sepulchres.
