= Nicola Zabaglia =

Italian engineer

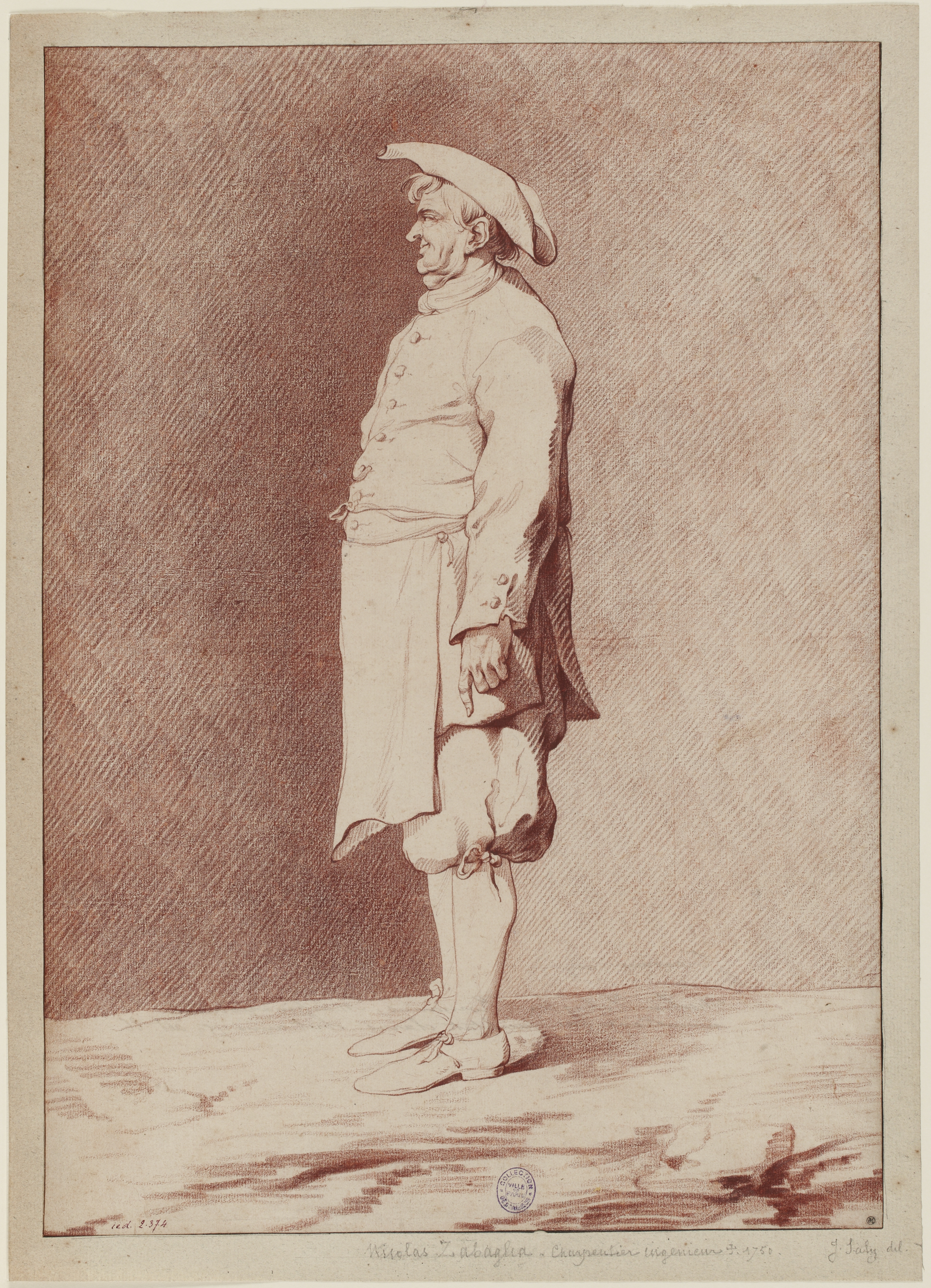
Portrait of Nicola Zabaglia

Nicola Zabaglia or Zaballi (January 1667 – 27 January 1750) was an Italian builder and engineer associated with the Fabric of Saint Peter. Despite having no formal education, he became known for developing machinery and efficient scaffolding systems for the maintenance and decoration of St. Peter's Basilica and St. Peter's Square in Rome. He is regarded as an important figure in the formation of the sanpietrini, the specialized workforce responsible for the maintenance of the basilica.

== Early life and career ==
Zabaglia was born in Buda of the Cascia comune, probably in January 1667, the son of Alessandro, a capomastro (master builder) at St. Peter's, and Geltrude Baldini. His obituary instead gave his year of birth as 1664.

In 1686, Zabaglia began working for the St. Peter's Fabbrica, the institution responsible for the construction and maintenance of St. Peter's Basilica, as a day labourer. He entered its permanent workforce in 1691. Although he lacked formal training and was reportedly unable to read, he displayed considerable ability in statics, mechanics and the movement of heavy loads. He was given a private workshop in which he developed prototypes and scale models of construction machinery and scaffolding systems.

Zabaglia specialized in devising machines and temporary structures for the unusually complex maintenance and decorative work undertaken within the basilica. His systems used ropes, hoists, winches, pulleys and relatively simple wooden components, permitting work at great heights and the movement of heavy objects while reducing the time and expense of erecting conventional scaffolding.

Zabaglia played an important role in the development of the specialized body of workers later known as the sanpietrini. He has been described by the Fabric of Saint Peter as a paradigmatic figure and a kind of founder of the group. His technical experiments and working methods contributed to the emergence of a more permanent and specialized maintenance workforce within the Fabric. The number of workers under his direction increased from 10 in 1703 to 42 in 1735.

== Castelli e ponti ==
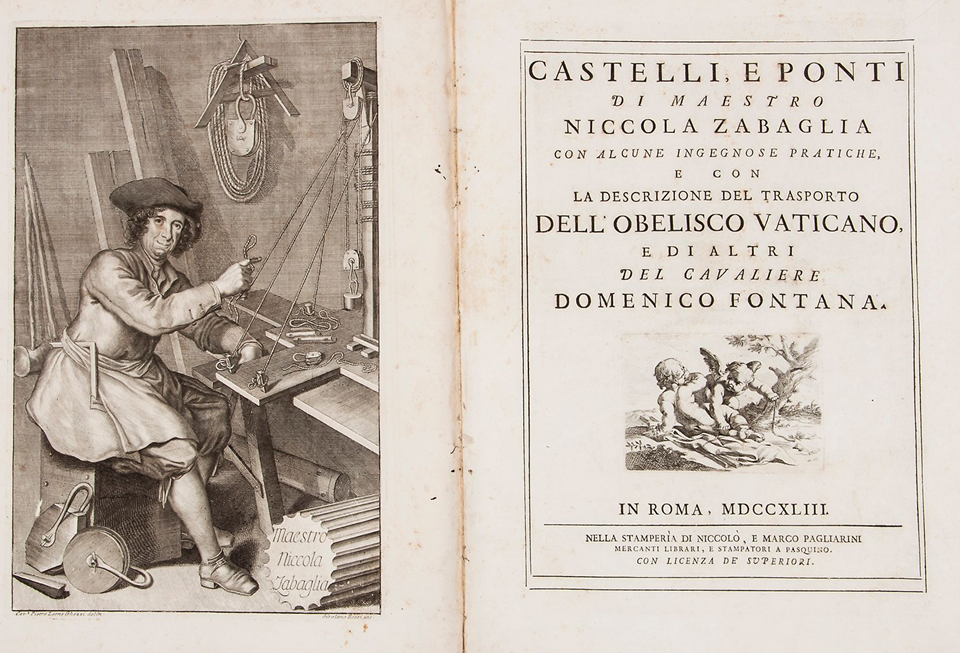
Engraving of Zabaglia (left)

Zabaglia's inventions and engineering works were illustrated in Castelli e Ponti di Maestro Niccola Zabaglia. The publication project, encouraged by Pope Clement XI, was interrupted in 1722. It was revived during the pontificate of Benedict XIV and published in Rome in 1743. The explanatory texts accompanying the plates were written by Lelio Cosatti.

The work recorded Zabaglia's scaffolds, lifting apparatus and other devices and helped disseminate his construction methods beyond St. Peter's. It was republished in 1824, with numerous plates and a detailed biography edited by Filippo Maria Renazzi.

== Death and legacy ==
Zabaglia died in Rome on 27 January 1750. In his will he left to his son-in-law, also a mason, "all his models made by him and caused to be made for the use of his profession". The models are no longer known to survive. He was buried in the Chapel of Saint Canute in Santa Maria in Traspontina. His tomb has been lost, along with its epigraph, which described him as literarum plane rudis, sed ingenii acumine adeo praestans ("entirely without literary education, but so outstanding in the acuity of his intellect").

Zabaglia's work also contributed to the development of a strong identity among the sanpietrini. In 1757, several years after his death, the workers requested an official uniform to distinguish them from pilgrims in the basilica, reflecting their increasing identification as a distinct specialist body.

The Municipality of Rome named the Nicola Zabaglia School of Arts and Crafts after him. Via Nicola Zabaglia in the Testaccio district of Rome also bears his name.
