= Votum =

Ancient Roman religious vow

In ancient Roman religion, a votum (plural vota; from Latin voveo, vovere 'vow, promise') is a vow or promise made to a deity. As the result of this verbal action, a votum is also that which fulfills a vow, that is, the thing promised, such as offerings, a statue, or even a temple building. The votum is thus an aspect of the contractual nature of Roman religion, a bargaining expressed by do ut des, "I give that you might give."

== Private vota ==
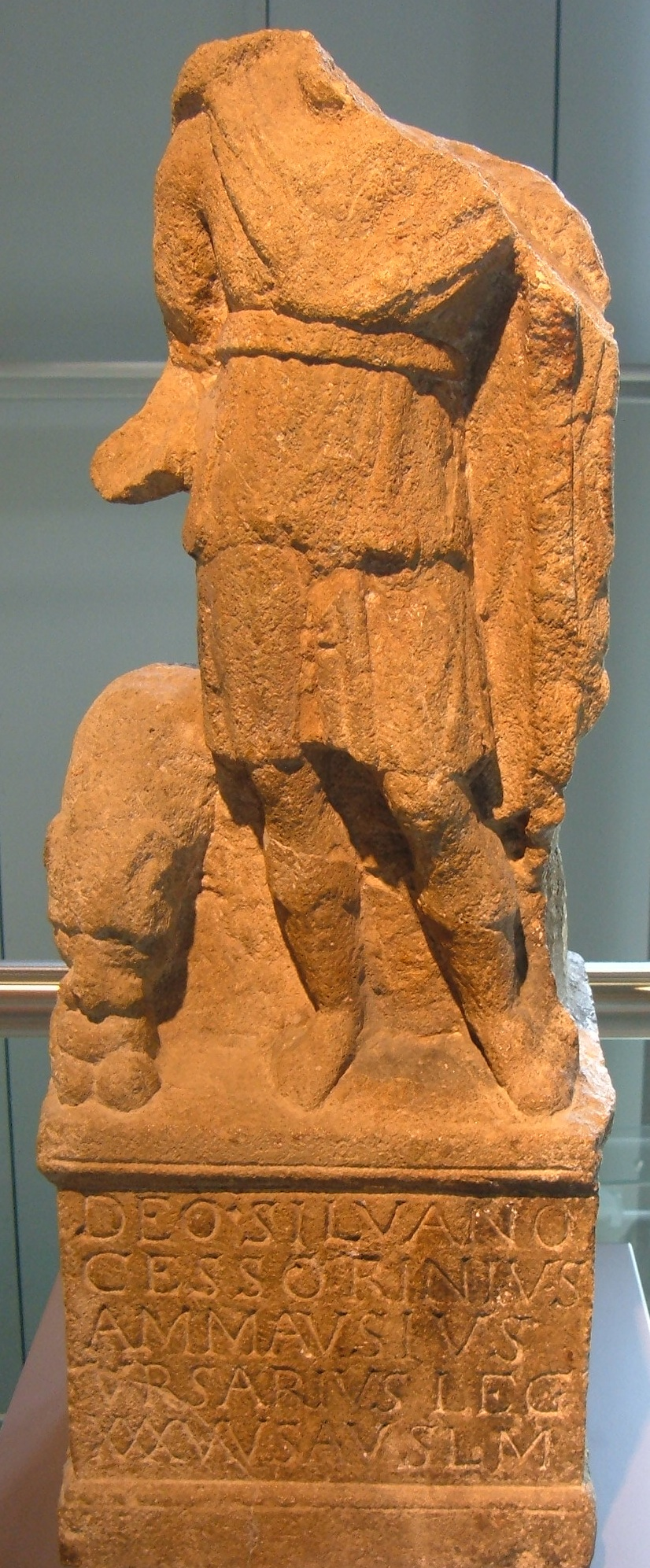
Votive statue for the god Silvanus; the inscription ends with the abbreviation V.S.L.M. (votum solvit libens merito)

In everyday life, individuals might make votive offerings to a deity for private concerns. Vota privata are attested in abundance by inscriptions, particularly for the later Imperial era. These are regularly marked with the letters V.S.L.M., votum solvit libens merito, noting that the person making the dedication "has fulfilled the vow willingly, as deserved." William Warde Fowler found in these offerings "expressions of … religious feeling" and a gratitude for blessings received that go deeper than contractual formalism.

== Military vota ==
During the Republican era, the votum was a regular part of ceremonies conducted at the Capitoline by a general holding imperium before deploying. The triumph with its dedication of spoils and animal sacrifices at the Capitol was in part a fulfillment of such a vow. A general who faced an uncertain outcome in battle might make a votum in the field promising to build a temple out of gratitude for divine aid in a victory. In 311 BC, Junius Bubulcus became the first plebeian general to vow and oversee the building of a temple; he honored the goddess Salus, "Salvation". A vow would also be made in connection with the ritual of evocatio, negotiations with the enemy's tutelary deity to offer superior cult. An extreme form of votum was the devotio, the ritual by which a general sacrificed himself in battle and asked the chthonic deities to take the enemy as offerings along with him.

== Public vota ==
In the Republic, public vota (vota publica) or vota pro salute rei publicae ("vows for the well-being of the republic") were offered on the day the consuls took office, eventually fixed on 1 January (Kal. Ian.). These were joined by vota for Caesar (vota pro Caesare or pro salute Caesaris) in 44 BC.

Under the Empire, the Senate decreed vota on behalf of Octavian (later Augustus) as princeps in 30 BC. These vows for the well-being of the emperor (vota pro salute imperatoris, principis, or Augusti) were moved to 3 January—the usual date of the Compitalia—under Caligula in AD 38. Vota for the state continued to be held on January 1st, while the vows for the emperor came to include his family as well.

During these public vows, offerings were made to Jupiter, Juno, Salus, and sometimes other deities. In Rome, these ceremonies were conducted by the consuls and pontiffs, and in the provinces probably by governors and local priests and officials. For the vota for the emperor and his family, the people of the capital were assembled to offer collective vows; it was refusal to take part in these events and similar rituals that sometimes led to persecution of Christians.

Subsequently, the anniversary day of each emperor's acclamation (dies imperii) were celebrated with similar rituals; larger rituals marked the 5 year (quinquennalia) and 10 year anniversaries (decennalia). Incomplete records have led scholars to debate whether particular quinquennalia and decennalia were celebrated at the beginning of the year, on the dies imperii, or at some other time for specific reasons in each case.

Vota publica continued in Rome even after Christianity had become the official religion of the Empire, possibly as late as the 6th century. Because the vows were as much affirmations of political loyalty as religious expressions, they were difficult to abolish without undermining the sacral aura of the emperor's authority.

In the Eastern Roman Empire, this festival was known as the Vóta (Βότα). The emperors Arcadius and Honorius banned the sacrifices associated with the festival. In 692 the Quinisext Council forbade Christians from celebrating, but it remained on the court calendar at least until the reign of Constantine VII Porphyrogenitus (r, 905–959).

== See also ==
- Ex-voto
