= Portico (disambiguation) =

A portico is a porch leading to the entrance of a building with a roof structure over a walkway.

Buildings named after their porticos include:

- Santa Maria in Campitelli, in Rome, called Santa Maria in Portico
- Porticus Aemilia, in Rome, is an ancient structure near the river Tiber
- Porticus Octaviae, in Rome, is an ancient structure near the old Roman Jewish Ghetto

Portico may also refer to:

- Portico, an imprint of Anova Books
- Portico Library, in England
- The Portico, a literary journal
- Portico (band), a jazz group from London, formerly named Portico Quartet
- Portico (service), a digital archive by Ithaka Harbors
- Portico, a deep water cargo terminal located within Portsmouth International Port, UK
- Portico (video game)
