= Pietro Lombardi (architect) =

Italian architect (1894–1984)

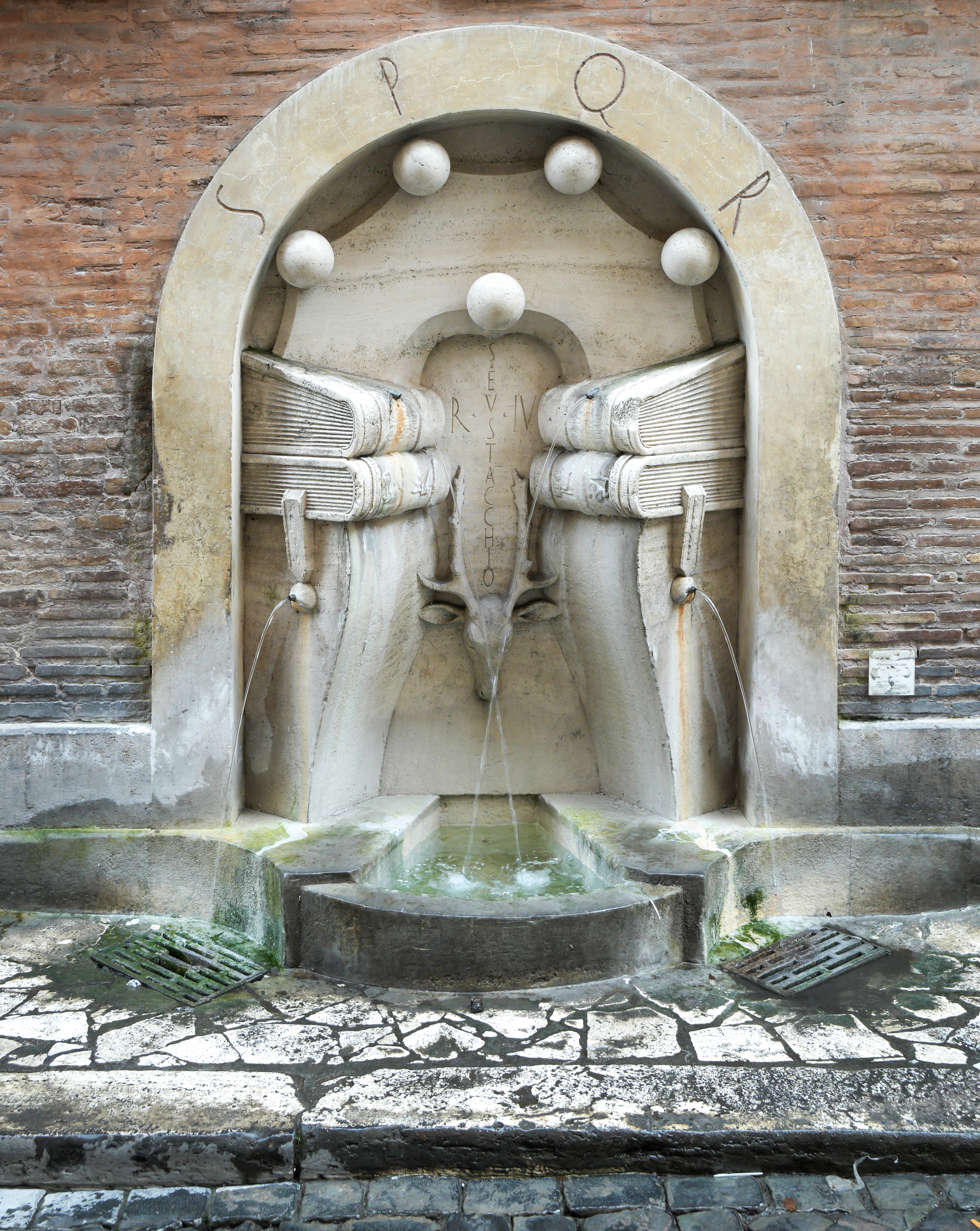
- Fontana dei Libri
- Born: 30 July 1894; Rome, Kingdom of Italy
- Died: 5 February 1984 (aged 89); Rome, Italy
- Education: Accademia di Belle Arti di Roma
- Occupation: Architect

Pietro Lombardi (30 July 1894 – 5 February 1984) was an Italian architect.

At the beginning of his career, Lombardi worked in the studios of Armando Brasini and Marcello Piacentini. With his design for the Fontana delle Anfore, a fountain in Testaccio, he won a national competition in 1925 for designing nine fountains in seven of the traditional quarters (rioni) of Rome.
