= Fontana dei Libri =

Fountain in Rome, Italy

- Fountain
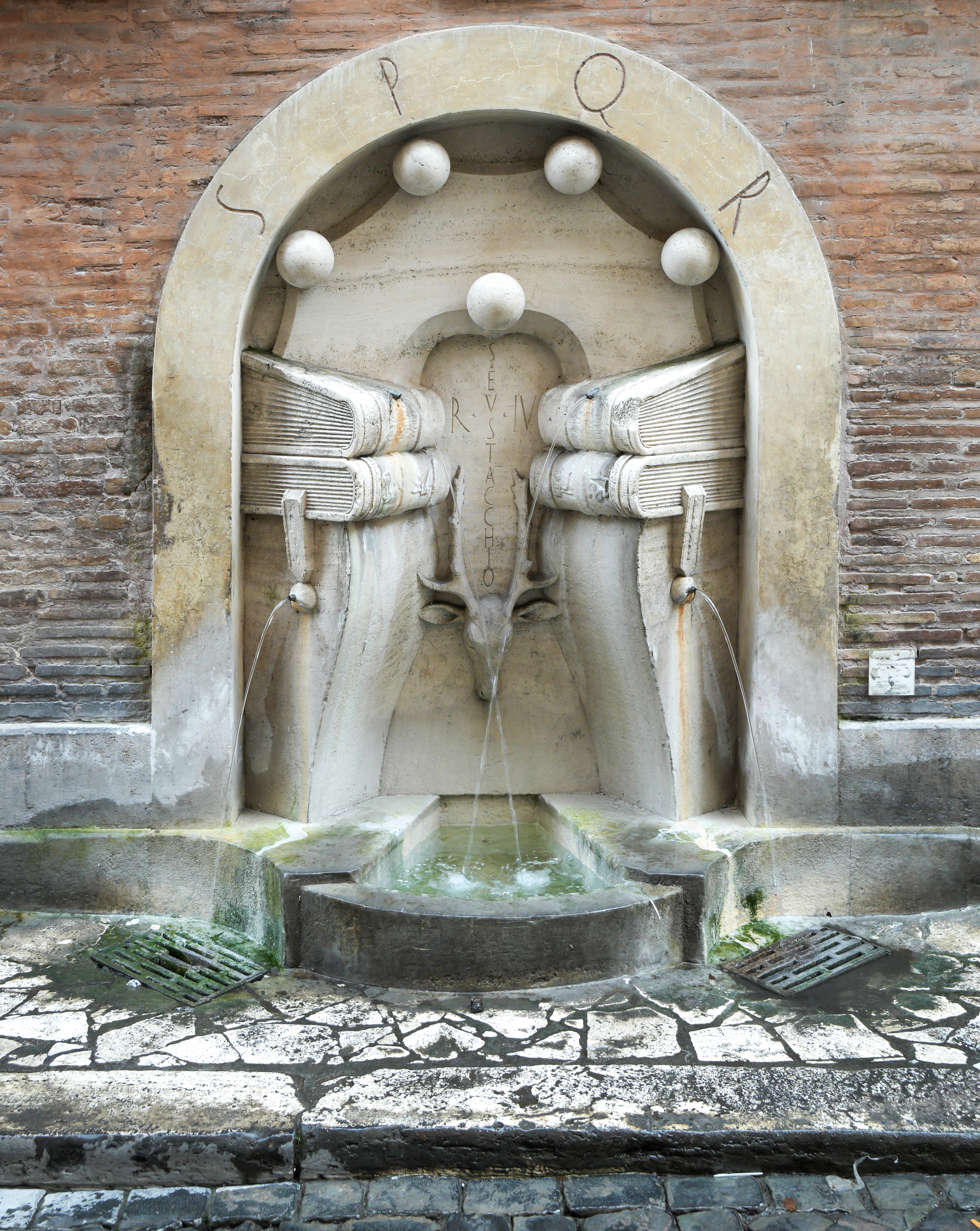
- The fountain in 2023
- Builder: Pietro Lombardi
- Completed: 1927
- Address: Via degli Staderari, 00186 Roma RM, Italy
- Location within Rome Location within Lazio Location within Italy
- Coordinates: 41.8984°N 12.4741°E

The Fontana dei Libri (Fountain of the Books) is a fountain in Rome, Italy. It is located on the site of the Palazzo della Sapienza, where the Roman State Archives are. The fountain is known for its unique design.

== History ==
The fountain is the last of the ten fountains built by Pietro Lombardi starting in 1925, with the Fontana dei Libri being completed in 1927. He was commissioned by the city's Antiquities and Fine Arts Office to replace the iron nasone that they felt was displeasing to the eye. The fountains show characteristics of what rione they are located in, with the Fontana dei Libri displaying the deer from the coat of arms of the rione it is in, Sant'Eustachio. The two large stacks of two books each adjacent to the deer symbolize the Sapienza University of Rome. The bookmarks on the bottom books formerly displayed fasces, as the fountains were designed during Fascist Italy, but they were chiseled away after the republic was formed. The engraving between the deer's horns in the fountain's center displays the name of the rione and its number. On it, Sant'Eustachio is erroneously numbered as IV, when it is instead VIII.

The fountain was restored in 1998, to remove limestone deposits. Another restoration occurred in 2018 after Dutch hooligans damaged the Fontana della Barcaccia after a football game in 2015. The Dutch association Wij Zijn Romeinen wanted to finance another restoration in addition to the Barcaccia fountain to show their love for Rome.
