= Five-Columns Monument =

4th-century Roman Forum monument

Five-Columns monument
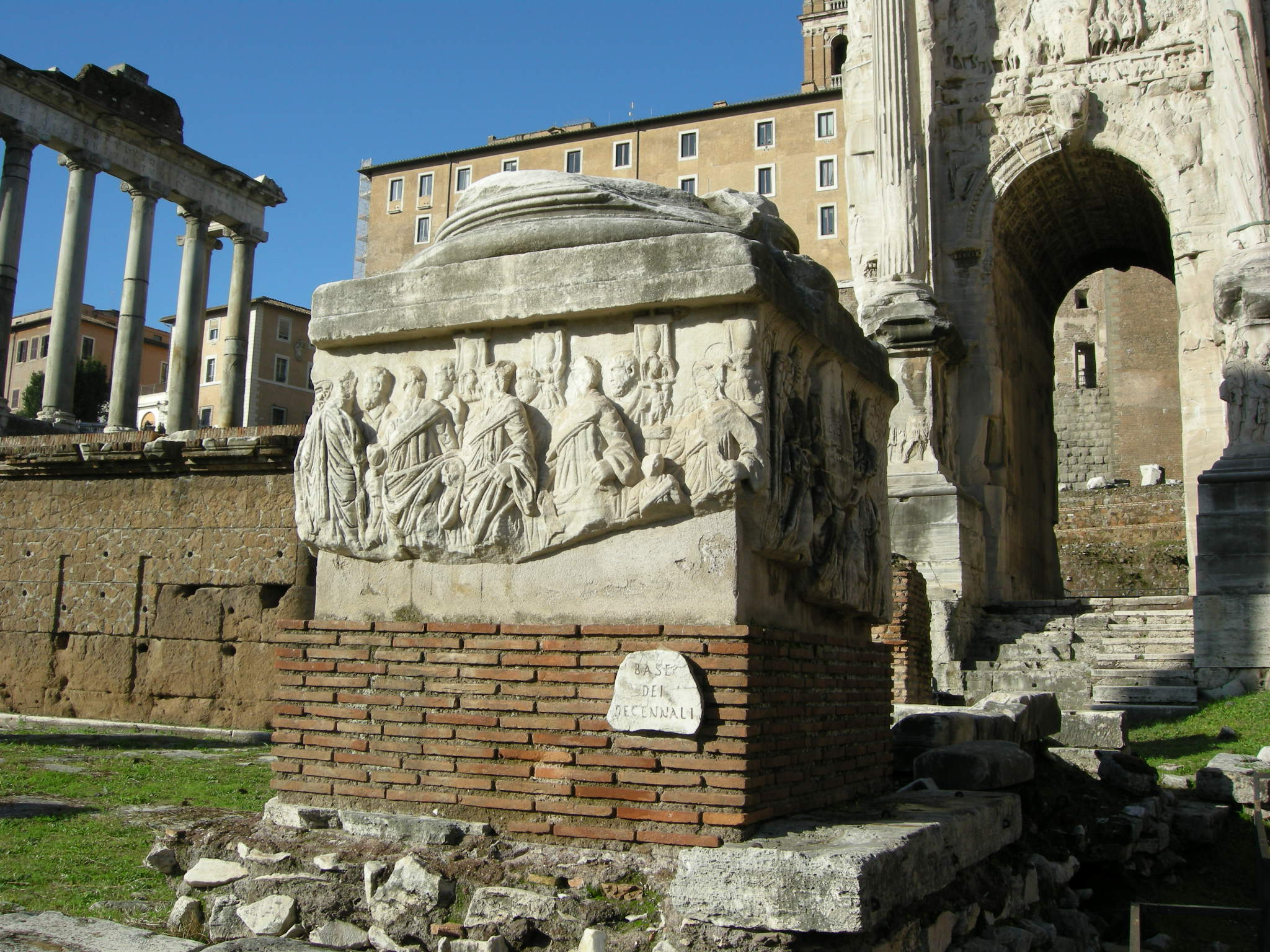
- Remains of the Five-Columns Monument in the Roman Forum

- Location within Rome
- Interactive map of Five-Columns monument
- 41°53′33.5″N 12°29′04.6″E

The Five-Columns monument is a dedicatory addition to the Rostra in the Roman Forum dating to the early fourth century CE. This monument was part of the Tetrarchy's expansion of the Forum and is connected to the tenth anniversary of the Caesares within the four-ruler system. It is also referred to as the Fünfsäulendenkmal as well as the four-column monument, depending on Jupiter's inclusion.

== History ==
Rebuilding the Roman Forum following the fire of 284 CE became an important task for the early reign of Diocletian and Maximian. They repaired the Basilica Iulia, the Curia, and the Augustan Rostra. Among these projects was a northern extension of Augustus' Rostra, located at the western side of the Roman Forum. This rebuilding also included additional support for five large columns topped with porphyry statues of the two Augusti, the two Caesares, and Jupiter. On the eastern side of the Forum, the Tetrarchs constructed a second Rostra that likely consisted of five column monuments as well. According to Gregor Kalas, the main proponent of mirrored Five-Columns monuments, the two speaker's platforms framed a visual link at opposite ends of the Forum that may have served to legitimize the Tetrarchic transformation of the principate created by Augustus.

This monument was dedicated during Diocletian's first visit to Rome in 303 CE during his twentieth year as emperor, in celebration of the tenth anniversary of the younger Caesares of the Tetrarchy who would ultimately succeed him. The rescheduling of Caesares Constantius and Galerius' celebration from 302, the end of their ninth year as was customary, to 303 reiterates the importance of synchronicity for the Tetrarchic anniversaries. Epigraphic evidence does not identify senatorial sponsorship of the monument, instead reinforcing the message of the imperial anniversary.

== Location and architecture ==
After Pietro Rosa's excavations in the Forum between 1872 and 1874, only some brickwork from the southeast corner of the eastern Rostra survives, bearing remnants of fittings for ship's prows. Although dual Five-Columns Monuments could have existed on both the western and eastern Rostra, the evidence that remains is located at the Augustan western Rostra. At present, the sole surviving column base has been placed on a repurposed brick plinth not far from its original location, near the Arch of Septimius Severus to the left of the Via Sacra. The monument's specific location on the Rostra has been debated. Some speculate that the columns were placed behind the speaker's platform, while others maintain that the columns were located on the Rostra.

The columns would have had white marble bases with carved relief on all four sides. Fragments of columns that are presumed to have belonged to this monument suggest undecorated monoliths of pink Aswan granite topped with porphyry statues. All of the statues would have been more than life-sized, at 2.5 to 2.8 meters each, with the four rulers atop columns 36 Roman Feet-tall, and Jupiter's column at the center would have been 40 RF high. Approximate measurements have been calculated based on the surviving marble plinth, with the tops of the columns reaching 13 meters above the Rostra floor, excluding the statue heights. Although insufficient evidence remains to make similar conjectures about the columns at the eastern Rostra, it is reasonable to suppose that the eastern monument would have been of similar proportions.

== Decennalia base ==
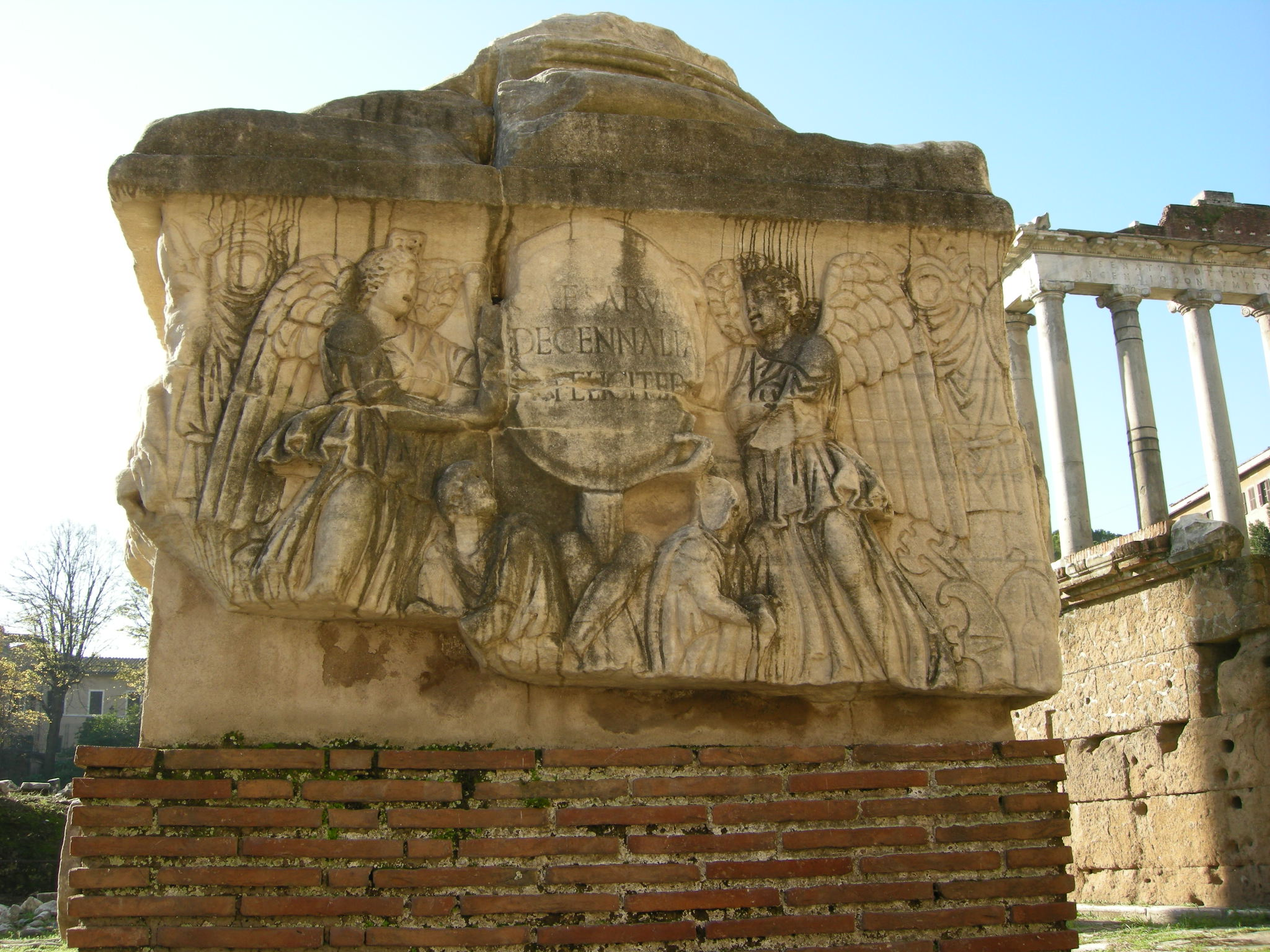
Decennalia inscription

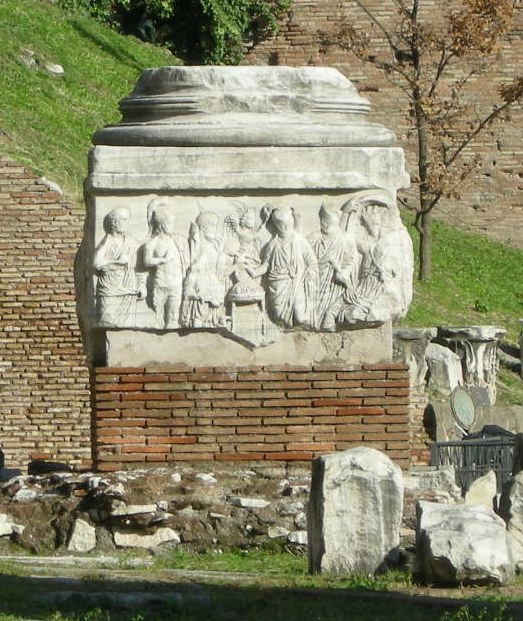
Imperial sacrifice relief

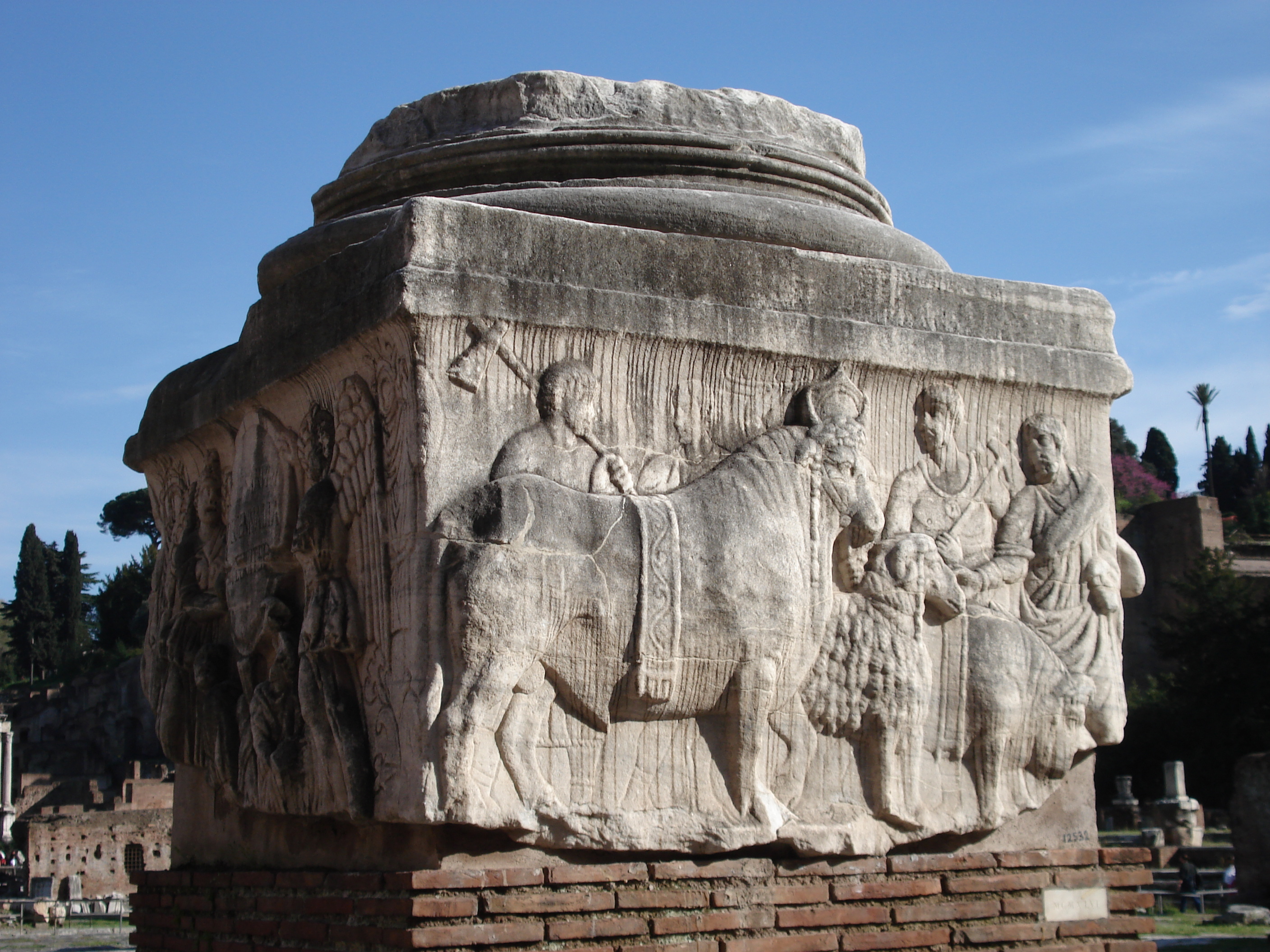
Suovetaurilia relief

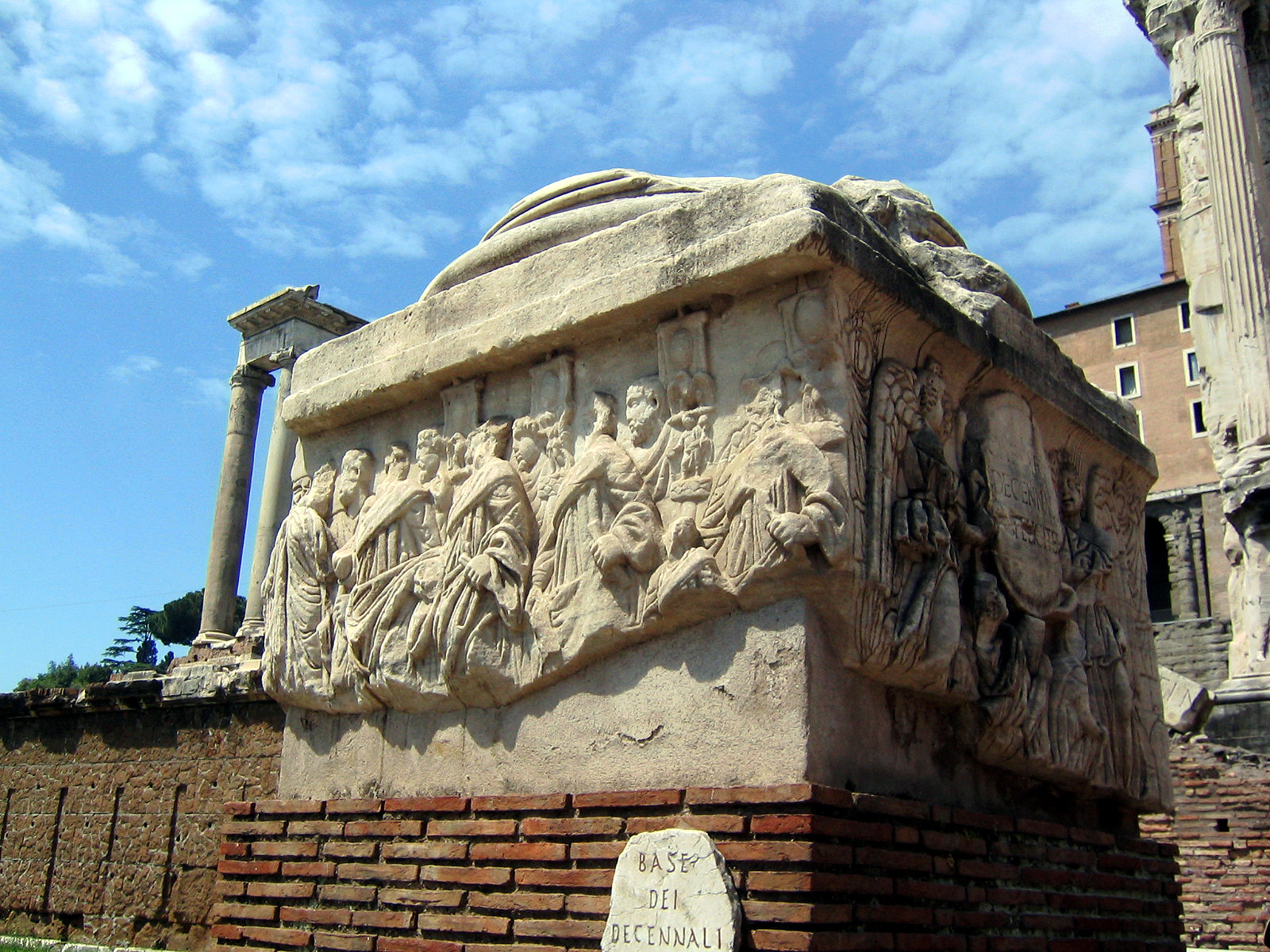
Senatorial procession relief

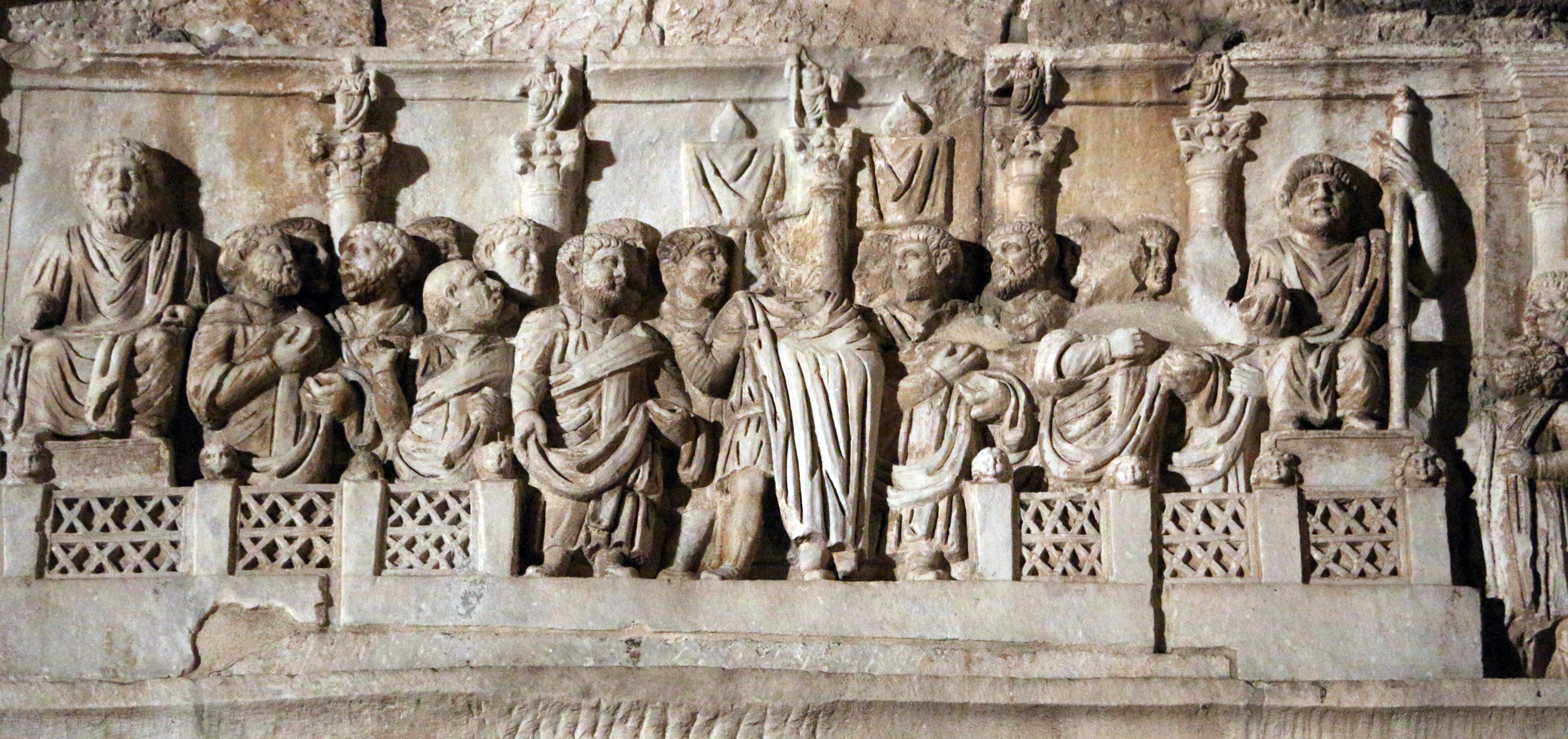
Arch of Constantine relief, featuring Constantine in front of the Five-Columns Monument

The Five-Columns monument is most widely recognized for its only preserved marble plinth, called the decennalia base. With relief carvings of ceremonial and ritual scenes on all four sides, this column base was uncovered in 1547 and now stands close to the findspot. The side with the decennalia inscription, from which the base name derives, is agreed to have been the most prominent side of the plinth. As for the other three sides, scholars vary in the order of their descriptions. Together, these reliefs represent the rites involved with taking vows for another decade of Tetrarchic reign. Some scholars have observed a sequence among the panel reliefs in which the animals are being led toward the sacrificial altar, with the imperial procession also heading for the altar scene.

=== The inscribed side ===
This northern side faces the via Sacra, and in its center, two winged Victories hold a shield with the inscription “Caesarum decennalia feliciter,” celebrating the tenth anniversary of the Caesares. However, neither emperor is identified specifically, a fact which Kalas believes “anticipated the continuity of joint rulership beyond the first Tetrarchy”.

=== Imperial sacrifice side ===
This southern side shows a small Victory crowning emperor, though unclear which one, making a libation at the altar of Mars. The god himself watches over the event from the left. The flamen Martialis priest, as identified by his pointed cap, stands between Mars and Victory. Positioned in front of the flamen is one child bearing the incense box and another playing flutes or pipes. To the emperor's right is a toga-clad personification of the Senate, genius senatus, with another senator on the far left of the scene. On the far right of the sacrifice are a headless seated Roma and a radiant Sol Invictus, who as a pair symbolize eternal Rome. Together with Mars and Victory, the emperor's offering unites military victory with the eternal glory of Rome.

=== Suovetaurilia side ===
This western side depicts a scene of preparations of a bull, sheep, and pig for sacrificial offering, in a ritual called the suovetaurilia. With the animals are attendants and a priest to perform the sacrifice, as part of the Tetrarchic decennial vows.

=== Senatorial procession side ===
This eastern side, facing the rest of the Forum, shows a procession of Roman senators. Four of them are carrying banners, which may be representative of honors for all four Tetrarchs.

== Other fragments ==
A few inscribed marble bases believed to come from this monument were uncovered in the area during the Renaissance. Although they have since been lost, one of them is recorded to have said, “Augustorum vicennalia feliciter” celebrating the twentieth jubilee of the Augusti, and another stated, “vicennalia Imperatorum” likewise for the twentieth anniversary of the emperors. These additional inscriptions would seem to indicate unity in the commemoration of the four Tetrarchs.

== Reconstruction of the monument ==
The events carved on the decennalia base represent ceremonies that the emperor would have performed in commemoration of the tenth jubilee. Although we have epigraphic evidence for other bases from this monument, it is difficult to determine what any of the other four column plinths would have depicted or how the decennalia base would have fit specifically within its monumental context. A symmetrical organization has been proposed, with the columnar statues of the Augusti immediately flanking that of Jupiter, and metaphorically introducing the exterior Caesares, in what Kalas believes could represent a peaceful transition of power from senior to junior successors.

The Arch of Constantine aids in our understanding of how the Five-Columns monument functioned in the Forum. The relief from the north facade depicts Constantine speaking at the Rostra, with five columns behind him. The emperor himself stands in front of the column of Jupiter, flanked by columns topped with statues of the Augusti Diocletian and Maximian and column statues of Caesares Galerius and Constantius Chlorus to their sides. Kalas does not view the portraits of the four rulers to be individualized, nor would they likely have been individualized in the real monument, in keeping with the Tetrarchic tenet of shared power. In this way, the Five-Columns Monument exhibited the Tetrarchs as a uniform divinized body, under Jupiter's sanction.

| Preceded by Trajan's Column | Landmarks of Rome; Five-Columns Monument | Succeeded by Porticus Aemilia |
