= Fontana delle Anfore =

- Fountain
- {{{other_names}}}
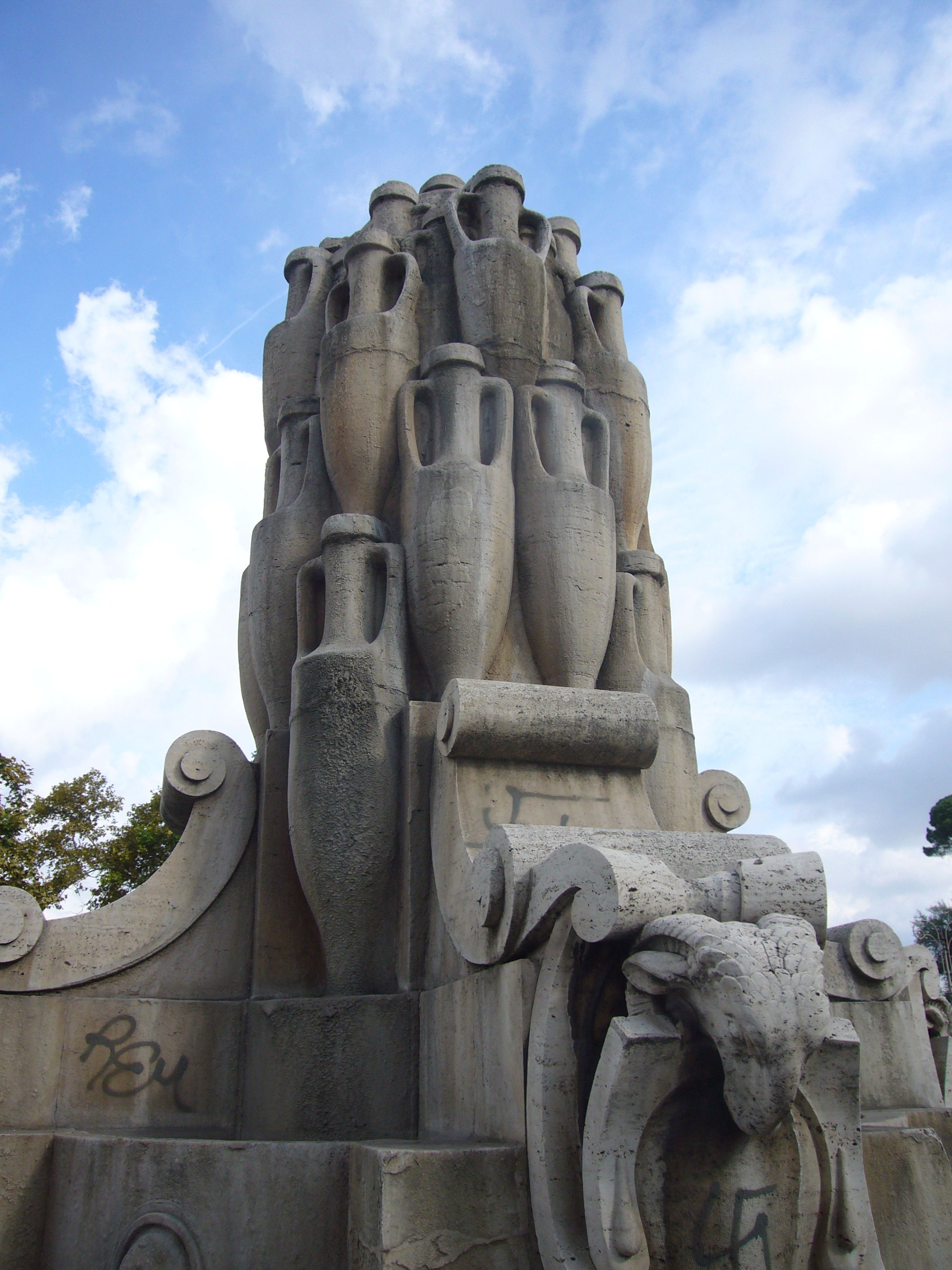
- Fontana delle Anfore
- Design: Pietro Lombardi
- Location: Testaccio, Rome
- Interactive map of Fontana delle Anfore
- Coordinates: 41°52′46″N 12°28′37″E

The Fontana delle Anfore (English: Fountain of the Amphorae), located in Testaccio, a quarter of Rome, Italy. It was completed in 1927 by Pietro Lombardi after he won a competition for new local fountains held in 1924 by the municipality of Rome. The motive of the amphorae refers to the Monte Testaccio and to the symbol of the whole quarter.

It was initially in Piazza Testaccio (at that time it was called Piazza Mastro Giorgio), but was moved to Piazza dell'Emporio in the mid-1930s. After the closure of the old Testaccio market in 2012, Piazza Testaccio was converted to an open space, reopening in January 2015, with the restored fountain again at its centre.
