= San Michele a Ripa =

Monumental complex of San Michele a Ripa Grande
- Complesso monumentale di San Michele a Ripa Grande
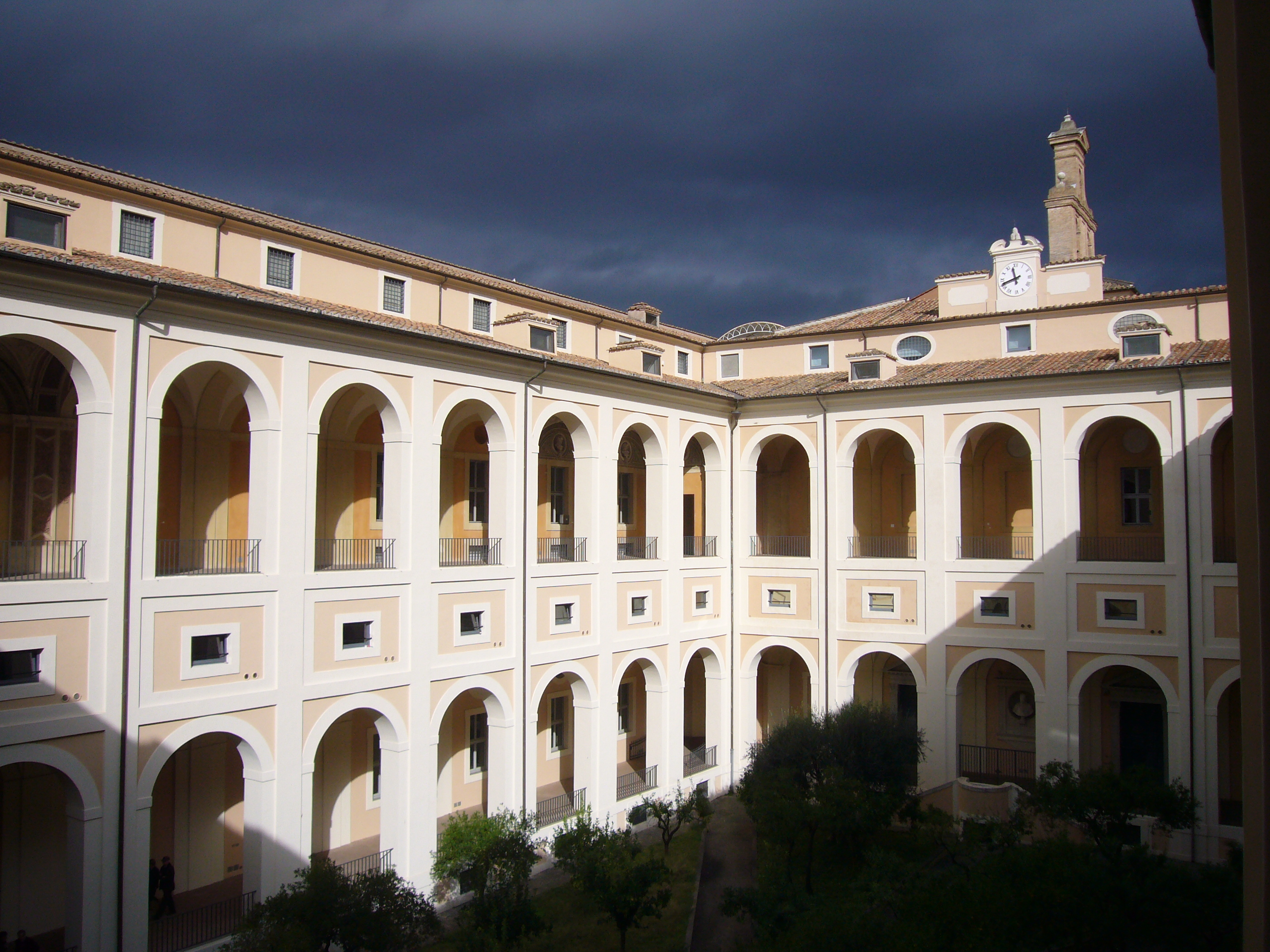
- The Courtyard of the Old Men
- Click on the map for a fullscreen view

General information
- Location: Rome, Italy
- Coordinates: 41°53′06″N 12°28′31″E
- Current tenants: Ministry of Cultural Heritage and Activities
- Construction started: 1686
- Completed: 1834
- Owner: State ownership

Design and construction
- Architects: Carlo Fontana, Mattia De Rossi, Giacomo Recalcati, Nicola Michetti, Ferdinando Fuga, Nicolò Forti, Luigi Poletti

The Ospizio di San Michele a Ripa Grande (Hospice of St Michael) or Ospizio Apostolico di San Michele in Rome is a complex represented by a series of buildings in the south end of the Rione Trastevere, facing the Tiber River and extending from the bank of Ponte Sublicio for nearly 500 meters. It stands across the river from the Rione Ripa and the area known as the Porto di Ripetta, once in the Aventine Hill neighborhood of Rome. The Porto di Ripa Grande was the river port that served those coming up from the Mediterranean port of Ostia. This area was once a main port of Rome. While large seafaring ships could not forge easily up the Tiber river to Rome; smaller boats frequently brought supplies from the coast to the city and offloaded at the Porta.

== History ==
The buildings of the Ospizio di San Michele were built during the 17th and 18th centuries and served a number of purposes including an orphanage, a hospice for abandoned elderly, and jails for minors and women. In 1679, a nephew of the new Pope Innocent XI (reigned 1676–1689), Monsignor Carlo Tommaso Odescalchi commissioned architect Mattia de Rossi to design, and within five years had built an hospice to house and train orphan children to manufacture of woven carpets and tapestries. To this building were added in 1693, the Ospizio dei Poveri Inabilito (disabled poor), and in 1709, Pope Clement XI commissioned the architect Carlo Fontana to extend the complex even further and transferred the elderly residents here from the Ospedale dei Mendicanti, located where the Via Giulia reached the Ponte Sisto. Later additions to the building were the prison for minors and an art school. In 1735, Pope Clement XII commissioned architect Ferdinando Fuga to design a woman's prison and a barracks for customs officers.

The Chiesa Grande, also known as the San Salvatore degli Invalidi, follows a design (1706) of Carlo Fontana, but construction was completed only in 1834 by Luigi Poletti. It has been reconsecrated. The church has an aedicula with a statue of the Saviour by Adamo Tadolini.

The smaller ancient church of Santa Maria del Buon Viaggio, on the south east end of the complex, was dedicated to sailors, who were embarking from here to travel down the Tiber. Initially, the church incorporated part of the walls of the city, then was incorporated by the complex. It remains closed.

== Decline and remodeling ==
The complex was most active as a charitable institution in the early 19th century. The factory manufacturing tapestries, the Arazzeria Albani, existed for centuries until 1910.

After the unification of Italy, the property was confiscated and given to the city of Rome. The buildings fell in great decay. During the Second World War, it was used for barracks by both German and Allied armies. In 1969, the complex was bought by the state, and offices of the Ministero dei Beni Culturali were housed there. The complex now houses the Ministry of Cultural Assets and the Environment, which uses the large rooms once belonging to the tapestry factory for restoration of artworks.
