= Ponte Sublicio =

Bridge in Rome

Ponte Sublicio Ponte Sublicio
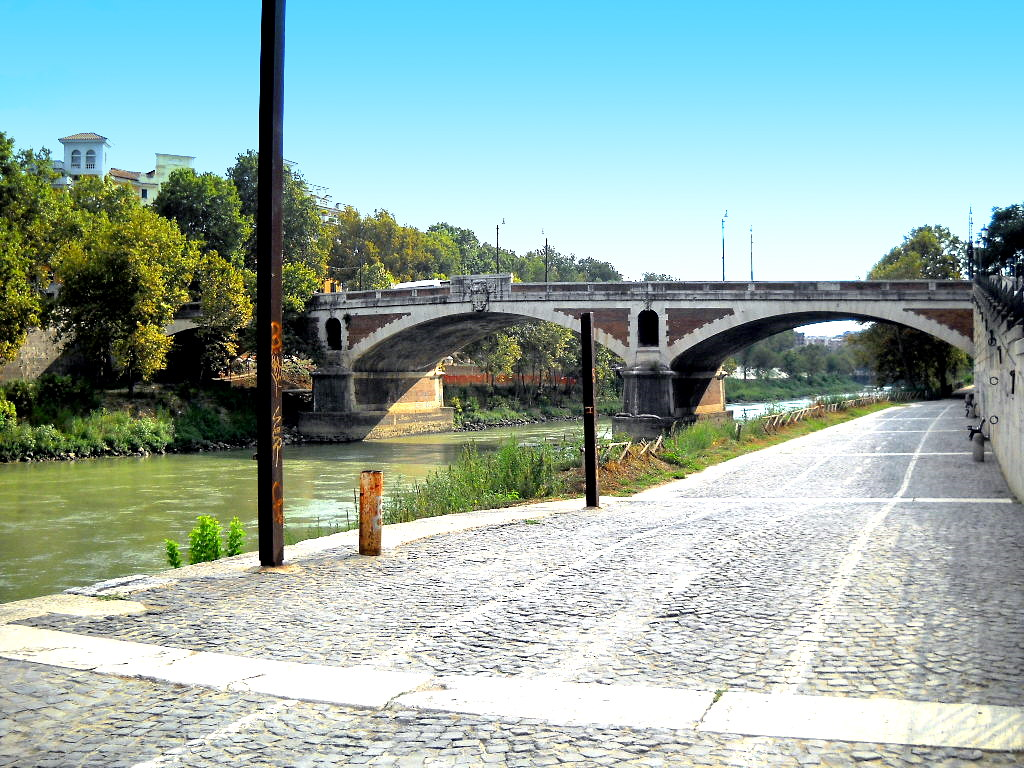
- Coordinates: 41.883261°N 12.475233°E
- Crosses: Tiber
- Locale: Rome (Italy)

Characteristics
- Total length: 105.55 metres (346.3 ft)
- Width: 20 metres (66 ft)

History
- Construction end: rebuilt in 1918

Location
- Interactive map of Ponte Sublicio

Ponte Sublicio, also known as Ponte Aventino or Ponte Marmoreo, is a bridge in Rome, Italy, over and linking the two banks of the river Tiber, connecting the Aventine Hill and Testaccio on one side (Piazza dell'Emporio, in the rione of Ripa) with Trastevere on the other side (Piazza di Porta Portese, in the quartiere of Portuense).

The most ancient bridge in Rome crossed river Tiber just downstream of the Tiber Island, in correspondence with the former ford that, during the protohistoric age, was a required stop along the north-south way, at the feet of the Aventine Hill. Its building has been ascribed to King Ancus Marcius (642–617 BCE) by Livy and Dionysius of Halicarnassus. No traces of the old bridge can be seen.

== Etymology ==
The current bridge takes its name from the oldest bridge of Rome, whose construction is attributed to the king Ancus Marcius in the 7th century BC. No trace of that structure remains today, but it stood further upstream, just downstream of Tiber Island, at the location of the ancient ford along the north–south route in protohistoric times.

The name comes from the Volscian word sublica, meaning "wood planks". In effect the bridge had been entirely built with wood.

== History ==
=== Ancient bridge ===
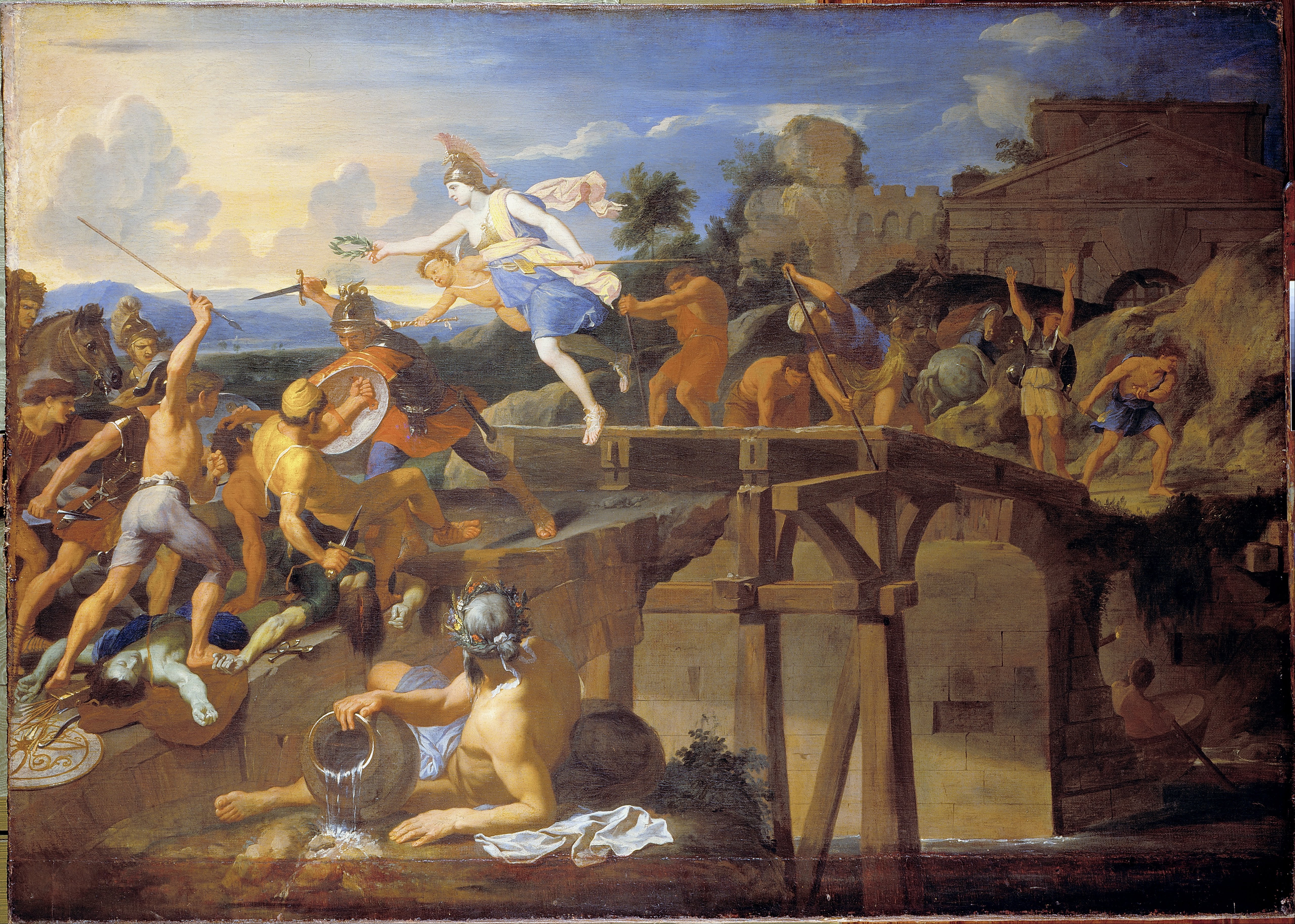
Painting showing Horatius Cocles defending the ancient bridge

Its construction has been attributed to King Ancus Marcius (642–617 BCE) by Livy and Dionysius of Halicarnassus. No remains are left of the ancient bridge, but it rose in correspondence to the present Via del Porto, at the north end of the monumental complex of San Michele a Ripa Grande.

The religious tradition (originated by the necessity to easily disassemble the bridge for defense purposes) prescribed that no other material than wood could be used. The bridge was held sacred (the designation "pontiff" or pontifex derives from the term pons) and archaic ceremonies were played on it, among which the throwing into the river of the Argei, or straw puppets (maybe a recollection of more ancient human sacrifices) during the ceremony called Lemuria.

Legend recounts that in the 6th century BC, during the war against the Etruscans of Porsena at the beginning of the Roman Republic, at the pons Sublicius Horatius Cocles held back the enemy alone while the Romans destroyed the bridge behind him.

The bridge withstood several restorations and reconstructions (during the 60 BC, 32 BC, 23 BC, 5 AD, 69 AD, under Antoninus Pius, and maybe under Emperors Trajan, Marcus Aurelius and Septimius Severus). On its imperial-age depictions in coins, the far ends of the bridge show arches with statues.

Remarkable remains of the bridge had been visible in the bed of Tiber until 1890 or so, when they were completely demolished during the works for the adaptation of the urban stretch of the river, as a preventive measure against floods.

=== Present bridge ===
The present bridge, bearing the same name of the ancient one, was built in 1918, after a design by Marcello Piacentini. Consisting of three arches and built in masonry, the bridge is 105m long and 20m wide.

== See also ==
- Bridges in Rome
