= Decennalia =

Ancient Roman festival

Decennalia or Decennia (Latin for "10th Anniversary") were Ancient Roman festivals celebrated with games every ten years by the Roman emperors.

The festival owed its origin to the fact that in 27 BC, Augustus refused the supreme power offered to him for life but would consent to accepting power only for ten years. During the festival, he would surrender all of his authority to the hands of the people, who were filled with joy and, charmed with the goodness of Augustus, immediately delivered it back to him again. The memory was preserved to the last ages of the empire by Decennalia, which was solemnised by subsequent emperors every tenth year of their reign, although they had received the imperium for life, not for the limited period of ten years.

During the festival, the people offered up vows to the emperor, vota decennalia, for the success and perpetuity of his empire. Roman coinage was specially modified during this time to indicate the undertaking of these vows, such as with the inscription VOTA SUSCEPTA DECENNALIA, or VOTIS X. From the time of Antoninus Pius, we find these ceremonies marked on medals: PRIMI DECENNALES; SECVNDI DECENNALES; VOTA SOL. DECEN. II; VOTA SVSCEP. DECEN. III. These vows must have been made at the beginning of every tenth year, since on the medal of Pertinax, who only reigned for 4 months in 193, there are the inscriptions VOTA DECENN. and VOTIS DECENNALIBVS.

Burkhard Gotthelf Struve (1671–1738), in his Antiquitatum romanarum syntagma cap. IV, is of the opinion that these vows took the place of those the censors used to make in the times of the Republic for the prosperity and preservation thereof. In effect, they were not only made for the ruler, but also for the state, as may be observed from Cassius Dio, and Pliny the Younger.

Quinquennalia ("5th Anniversary") were celebrated every five years. Vicennalia ("20th Anniversary") were celebrated every 20th year and—in the case of Constantine the Great—a tricennalia ("30th Anniversary") was celebrated during his 30th year of rule.

== Decennalia base ==
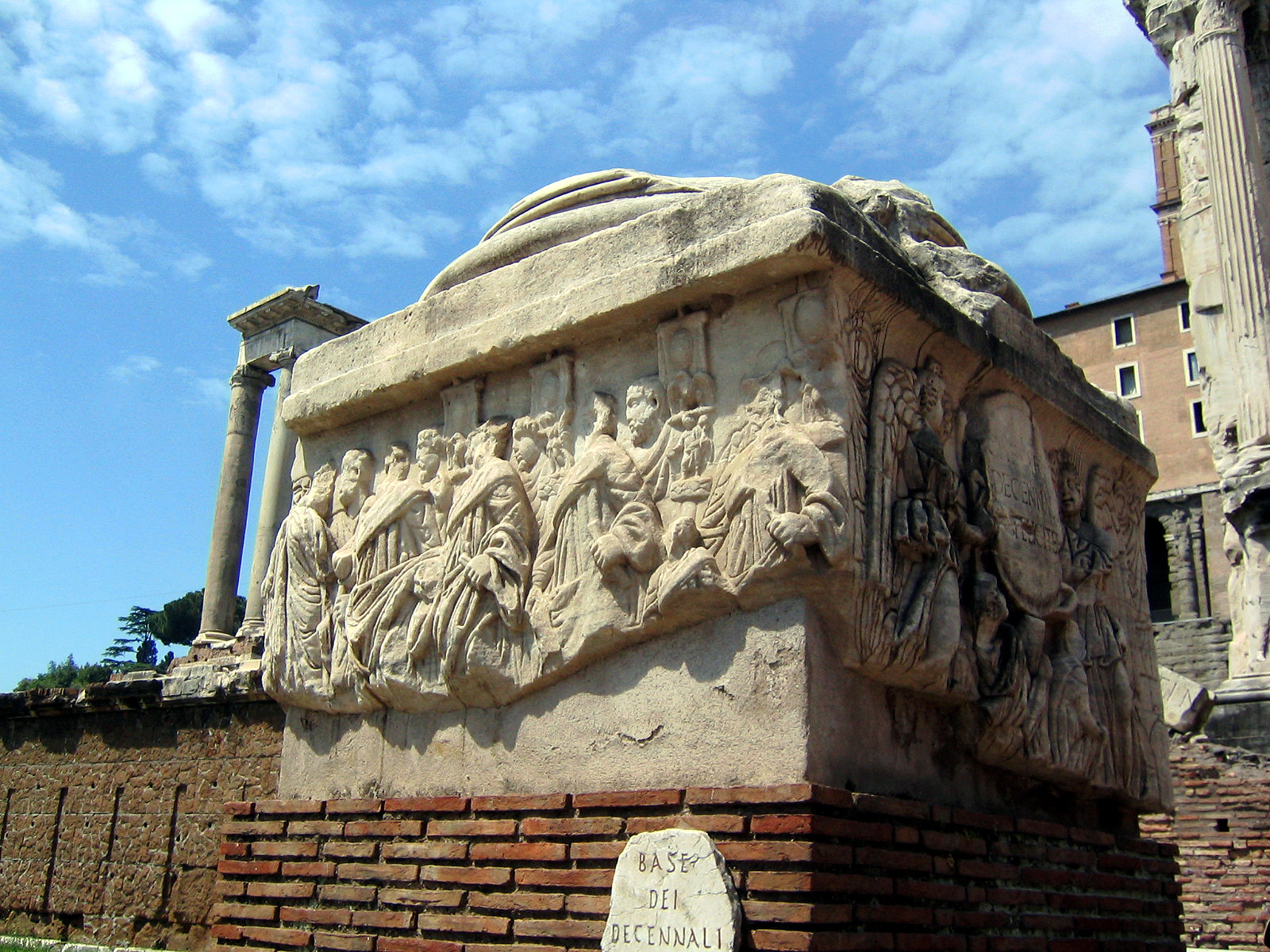
The Decennalia base

A Five-Columns Monument was constructed behind the Rostra in early 4th century and dedicated during Diocletian's visit to Rome in 303. This was one of the first major monuments to be erected in the Roman Forum since the reign of Septimius Severus, which then ensued the celebration of the tenth anniversary of the Tetrarchy (the rule of four emperors), instituted by Diocletian around 293 CE to 313.

In 1547, a marble pedestal located near the Via Sacra was discovered . On this pedestal there are two chiseled winged victories who hold a shield on with an inscription that states CAESARUM DECENNALIA FELICITER, which translates to "Happy Tenth Anniversary of the Caesars." The other side of the marble base includes the sculpting of a sheep, bull, and pig, as well as other attendants. These animals were significant due to the fact that they were traditionally sacrificed to Mars. Another face of the monument depicts a procession of senators, as well as another side of the base which depicts a winged Victory flying to crown Caesar.

== Other significant ancient Roman holidays ==
- Lupercalia – Ancient pastoral annual festival celebrated in the city of Rome on February 15th
- Parilia – Ancient Roman festival
- Saturnalia – Ancient Roman festival in December
