= Filippo Maria Renazzi =

Italian writer

- Born: 4 July 1745; Rome
- Died: 29 June 1808 (aged 62); Rome
- Writing career
- Period: Illuminism
- Genres: Criminal law, History
- Notable works: Elementa juris criminalis; Storia dell’Università degli Studi di Roma detta comunemente la Sapienza

Filippo Maria Renazzi (4 July 1745 – 29 June 1808) was an Italian Jurist and historian active in the Papal States of the eighteen century. During his life he was a well known scholar of criminal law, and nowadays he is mainly remembered for his history of the University of Rome.

== Biography ==
He was born in Rome on 4 July 1745 to his Bolognese parents, Ercole Maria and Barbara Montacheti. As soon as he graduated in Law, as early as 1768, at the age of 21, he became a professor at the Archiginnasio Romano (as it was called at the time La Sapienza University of Rome). The following year he was entrusted with the Chair of criminal Law, which he held for 34 years. He was the author of Elements of Criminal Law (Elementa juris criminalis), adopted in many Italian universities as a textbook. In the four volumes that make up this work was the first to attempt a concise critical history of the discipline of criminal law.

His criminal doctrine spread throughout Italy and also in France. At the end of the eighteenth century it was among the most representative Italian penalists together with Luigi Cremani and Cesare Beccaria.

He was offered the chair of Jurisprudence of the University of Pavia, and in 1803 that of Criminal Law of the University of Bologna, but he refused to stay in Rome. He was called by Empress Catherine II of Russia in St. Petersburg to collaborate in the laborious reform of the Criminal Code, which began in 1767 and lasted for many years.

He participated in the government of the 1798-99 Roman Republic, and for this reason at the restoration of the Papal States, he was dismissed from teaching. He was shortly restored as professor at the Sapienza University in 1801 up to 1803, when he had to retire. In 1803, he was ascribed to Roman Nobility.

Renazzi dedicated the last years of his life to studies and publications, and in particular to his history of the University of Rome (La Sapienza University) published between 1803 and 1806.

He died in Rome on 29 June 1808, after 18 days of illness. His funeral monument is located in the entrance portico of the Basilica of Sant'Eustachio in Rome.

== Works ==
Renazzi's main book related to Criminal Law is Elementa juris criminalis (Elements of criminal Law) in four volumes published in 1773, 1775, 1781, 1786. Renazzi in his book took a stand against the formalist and strict methods of the previous scholarship of criminal Laws, typical of authors such as Prospero Farinacci, moving towards a new, clear and structured approach typical of the Enlightenment, retaining however deep roots in the Roman Law, in the Catholic moral theology and in the classical studies. He cautiously opposed the death penalty and fiercely disapproved the use of torture in trials. He supported the separation of powers and a reduction in the judicial discretion. He slightly supported the inquisitorial system over the adversarial system.

Other juridical works of him are: De sortilegio et magia liber singularis (Venice: 1782), where he supports the decriminalization of witchcraft; De ordine seu forma judiciorum criminalium diatriba (Rome: 1777), an outline of the history of criminal Law; and Synopsis elementorum juris criminalis (Rome: 1803), a summary of his Elementa juris criminalis.

In his work on the Sapienza University of Rome (Storia dell’Università degli Studi di Roma detta comunemente la Sapienza, Rome: 1803-1806), he not only researches on the history of the university but also outlines the history of Roman culture from the middle ages to his time.

He wrote also a history of the Apostolic Palace (Notizie storiche degli antichi vicedomini del patriarchio lateranense e de’ moderni prefetti del sagro Palazzo Apostolico ovvero maggiordomi pontifizi, Rome: 1797).

Renazzi wrote three essays in polemic with the thought of Jean-Jacques Rousseau, stating that classical studies and poetry have a positive impact on civilization when supported by morality.
