= Testaccio =

20th rione of Rome

Coordinates: 41°52′34″N 12°28′30″E

- Rione of Rome
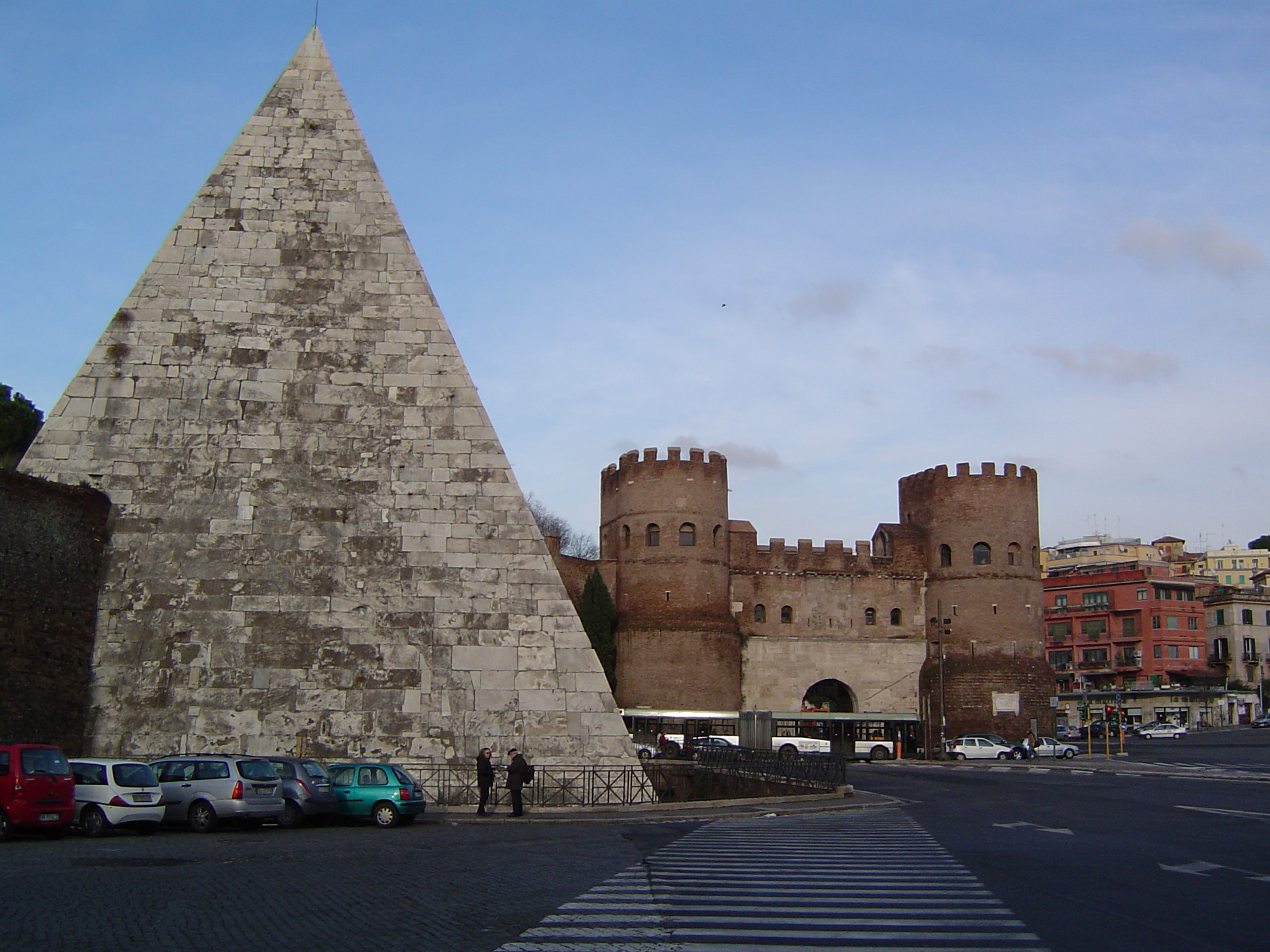
- The Pyramid of Cestius and Porta San Paolo

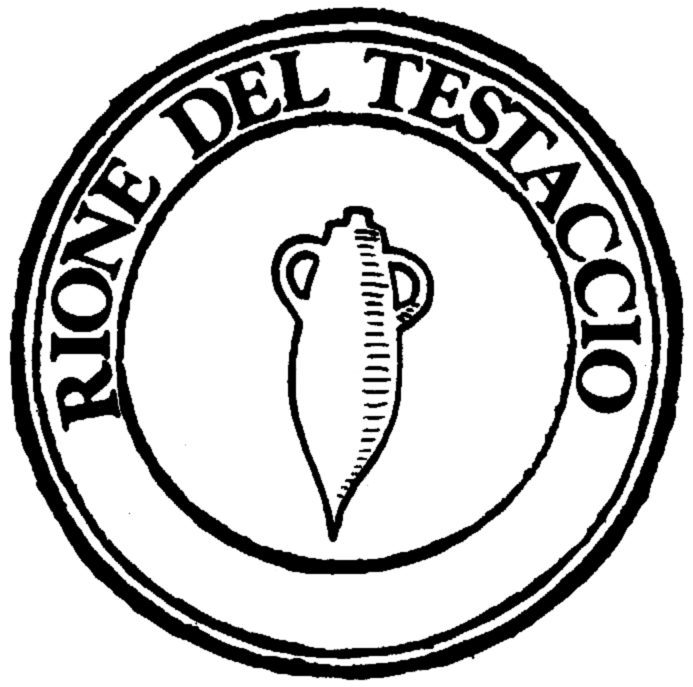
- Seal

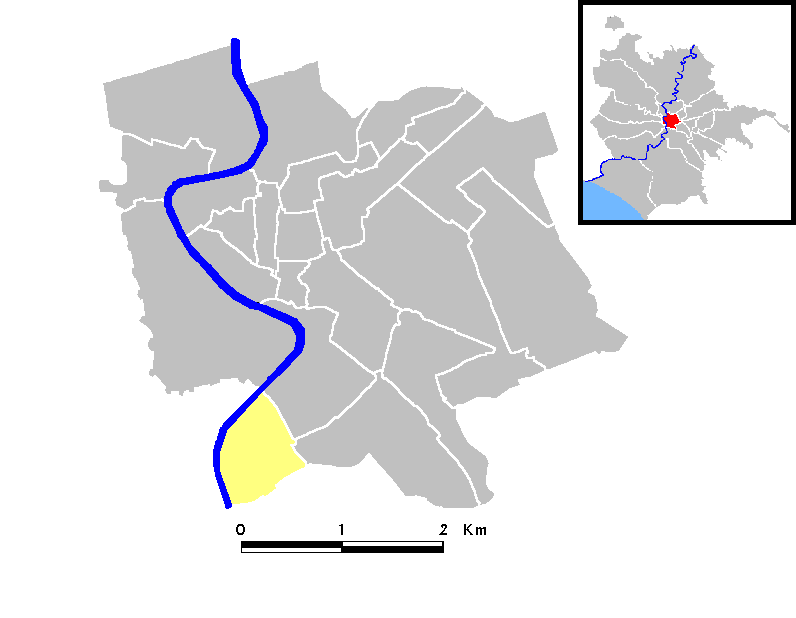
- Position of the rione within the center of the city
- Country: Italy
- Region: Lazio
- Province: Rome
- Comune: Rome
- Demonym: Testaccini
- Time zone: UTC+1 (CET)
  - Summer (DST): UTC+2 (CEST)

Testaccio (Italian: [teˈstattʃo]) is the 20th rione of Rome, Italy, identified by the initials R. XX, deriving its name from Monte Testaccio. It is located within the Municipio I. Its coat of arms depicts an amphora, referencing to the broken vessels that Monte Testaccio is made of.

== History ==
In antiquity, much of the Tiber trade took place here, and the remains of broken clay vessels (amphorae) were stacked creating the artificial Testaccio hill, which today is a source of much archaeological evidence as to the history of ancient everyday Roman life.

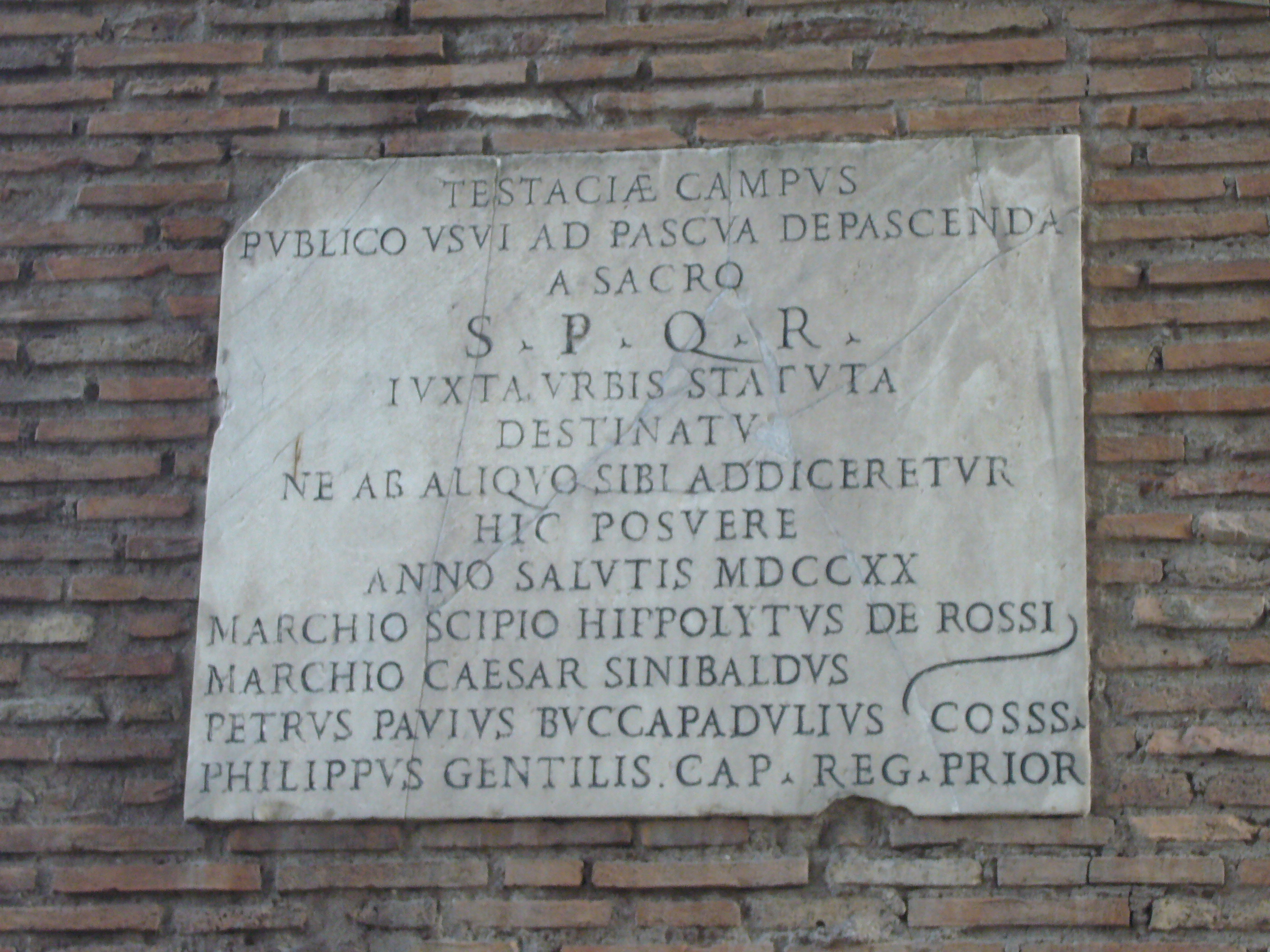
A 1720 plaque remembering the public use of Prati di Testaccio

Until the urban recovery that took place after 1870, which destined a huge area to industrial and manufacturing purposes, the borough was chiefly inhabited by poor farmers and shepherds, it was vulnerable to the Tiber floods and infested by malaria. The zone between Monte Testaccio and the city walls (Prati di Testaccio) was public and commonly used by the citizens as a recreation ground, traditional destination of holiday trips and of the typical ottobrate, hence the name prati del popolo romano (lit. 'Rome people's meadows').

The portion of the rione, inside the Aurelian Walls, is born as a residential extension of the productive area, housing the laborers of the several industries that arose at the end of the 19th century by the side of Via Ostiense. The first town plan, in 1873, designated the area for the industrial expansion of Rome because of the level terrain and of the several communication routes with the city, such as Via Ostiense, the river and the new railway.

Albeit until 1921 the rione was administratively a portion of Ripa, Testaccio has always had a strong identity, even if it had often a bad reputation, especially due to the countless traffics that took place in the harbor. In 1884 an inquiry launched by the municipality bestowed on Testaccio the national record in alcohol usage, while between the 1980s and the 90s it was the stronghold of the so-called Testaccini, a branch of the Banda della Magliana.

Testaccio is considered the cradle of A.S. Roma, as the Campo Testaccio has been the home stadium of the football club between 1929 and 1940.

In modern times, the area became a center of activity for butchers. Testaccio was one of Rome's traditional working-class neighbourhoods, but the recent process of gentrification has made it increasingly attractive to tourists. The neighbourhood is home to several of Rome's culinary highlights. Testaccio's reputation among tourists is expanding.

== Geography ==
Initially a part of Ripa, the rione was established in 1921.

Testaccio has two principal squares:

- Piazza Testaccio, the core of the rione, location of the local market until 2012, when it was moved to Via Luigi Galvani;
- Piazza Santa Maria Liberatrice, the social kernel of the borough, where the church and the theatre are: the square has an ample park in the middle, which is named after the Di Consiglio family, fallen in the Ardeatine massacre.

=== Boundaries ===
Eastward, the rione is separated from San Saba (R. XXI) by the portion of Via Marmorata between Piazzale Ostiense and Largo Manlio Gelsomini, while the boundary with Ripa (R. XII) is marked by the remaining stretch of Via Marmorata, up to Piazza dell'Emporio.

To the west and to the north, Testaccio borders with quartiere Portuense (Q. XI), from which it is separated by the stretch of the River Tiber between Ponte Sublicio and Ponte San Paolo.

Southward, the rione borders with quartiere Ostiense (Q. X): the border is defined by the Aurelian Walls beside Viale del Campo Boario, between Ponte San Paolo and Piazzale Ostiense.

=== Odonymy ===
Roads and squares of Testaccio are mostly named after explorers, scientists and engineers. Odonyms of the rione can be categorised as follows:

- Local names, such as Lungotevere Testaccio, Via Marmorata (named after the countless marbles and stones arriving at the harbour in the past centuries), Via Caio Cestio (named after the Roman magistrate for whom the namesake pyramid was built) and Piazza dell'Emporio (after the Emporium);
- Explorers and seamen, e.g. Ludovico di Vartemà, Orazio Antinori, Gustavo Bianchi, Antonio Cecchi, Romolo Gessi, Pietro Querini, Amerigo Vespucci;
- Entrepreneurs and ship owners, e.g. Florio, Ginori and Raffaele Rubattino;
- Scientists and engineers, like Giovanni Branca, Galileo Ferraris, Beniamino Franklin, Luigi Galvani, Alessandro Volta, Nicola Zabaglia;
- Typographers, such as Giovanni Battista Bodoni and Aldo Manuzio;
- Artists, e.g. Luca della Robbia, Paolo Caselli, Lorenzo Ghiberti, Mastro Giorgio and Ottavio Leoni;
- Roman dialect poets, e.g. Orazio Giustiniani.

== Places of interest ==
=== Palaces and other buildings ===
- Ex Mattatoio
- Porta San Paolo

=== Archaeological sites ===
- Pyramid of Cestius
- Porticus Aemilia

=== Churches and religious features ===
- Santa Maria Liberatrice
- Santa Maria della Divina Provvidenza
- Protestant Cemetery

=== Other ===
- Fontana delle Anfore

=== Education ===
Testaccio has a public library, named after Enzo Tortora, and a biblioteca federata, Biblioteca della Scuola popolare di musica Testaccio.

== Famous residents ==
- Elsa Morante, writer
- Luigi Di Biagio, Serie A footballer
- Claudio Ranieri, Series A coach
- Enrico Letta, Italian politician
- Giuliano Ferrara, journalist and opinion maker
- Rachel Roddy, writer
