= Porticus Aemilia =

Portico in ancient Rome

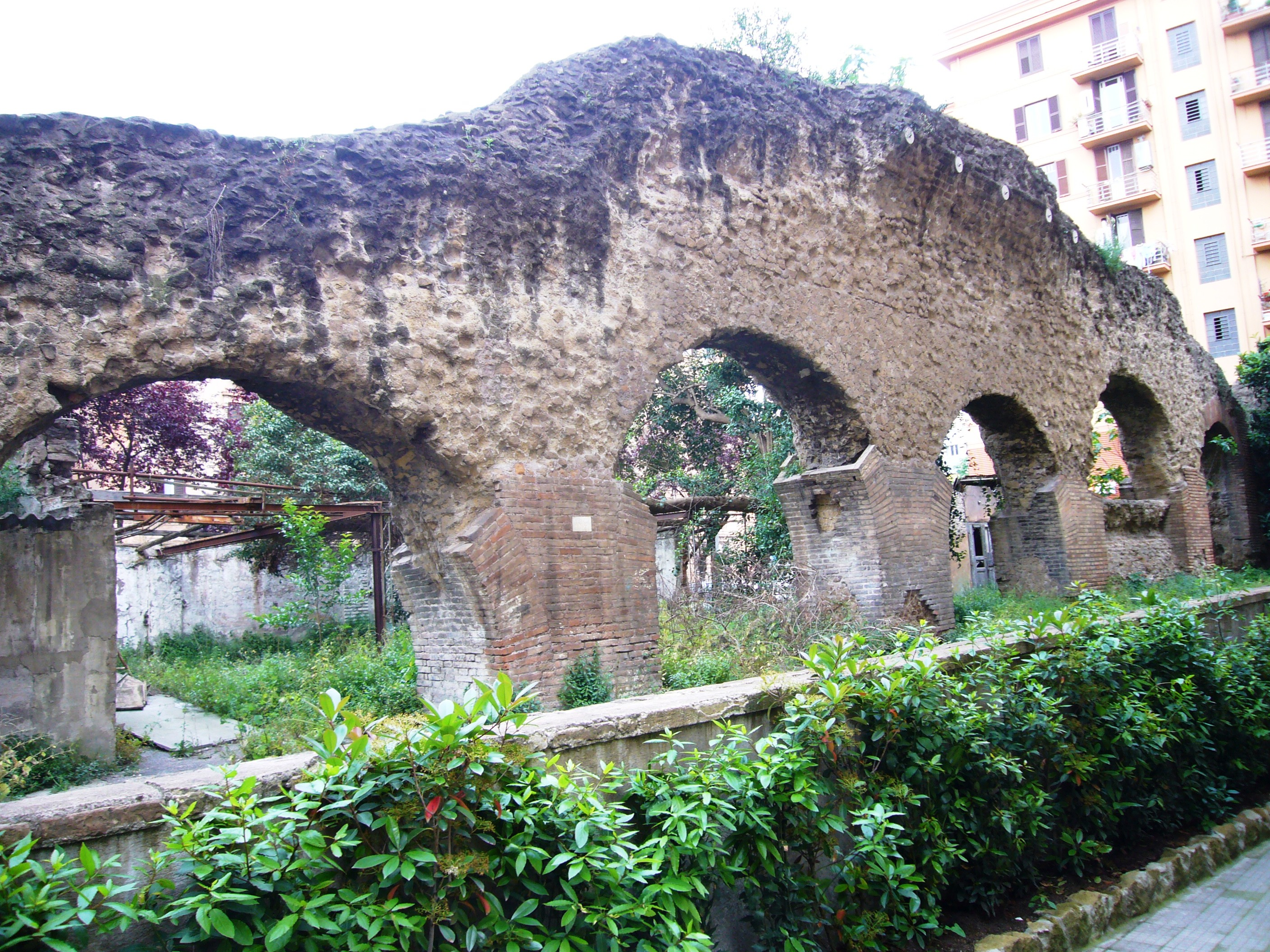
- Testaccio, remains arguably pertaining to the Porticus Aemilia

- Location within Rome
- Interactive map of Porticus Aemilia
- 41.880111°N 12.473611°E

Porticus Aemilia (Latin for the "Aemilian Portico") was a portico in ancient Rome. It was one of the largest commercial structures of its time and functioned as a storehouse and distribution center for goods entering the city via the Tiber river.

== History and description ==
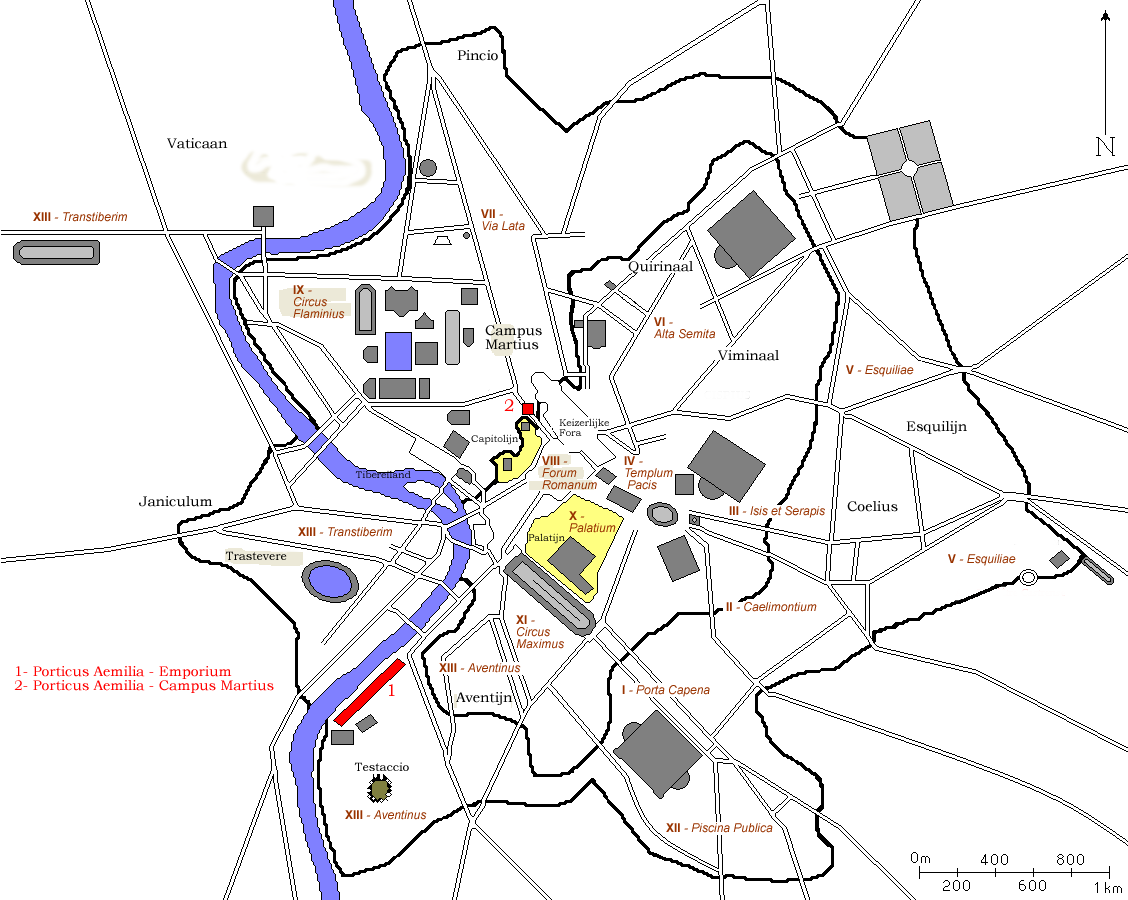
Hypothetical position of the Porticus Aemilia (not to be confused with the structure of the same name placed in Campus Martius)

The portico was built in 193 BC by aediles Marcus Aemilius Lepidus and Lucius Aemilius Paullus from which the name of the structure and association to the gens Aemilia is derived (Livy, 35.10.12). It was subsequently rebuilt in 174 BC by censors Quintus Fulvius Flaccus and Aulus Postumius Albinus (Livy, 41.27.8).

The development of the portico coincided with the rapid growth of the city after the Second Punic War. This increase, in both trade and population, placed stresses on the limited space available in the Forum Boarium and underlined the importance of the river link to Rome's main port at Ostia. The portico and the emporium appear to have worked together to facilitate the unloading, storage, and possibly redistribution of goods and foodstuffs, including imported grain for the corn dole, and appear to have been in continuous operation until the 6th century CE.

The opus incertum building, in the form of a thin rectangle running parallel to the Tiber, was very large; approximately 487 meters (1,598 ft) long, 60 meters (200 ft) deep and subdivided by 294 pillars in rows of seven. These created a series of 50 aisles, each 8.30 meters (27.2 ft) across. They were roofed by a series of overlapping vaults that rose in line with the slope of the hill, offering protection from the elements while allowing in light and air. The total covered surface was 25,000 square meters (270,000 sq ft).

The building was set back approximately 90 meters (300 ft) from the Emporium and river access, possibly to mitigate the effects of seasonal flooding. By the Trajanic period this space was filled with additional commercial structures, and the large utilitarian spaces in the portico were put to a variety of uses, often modified or subdivided to suit the needs of their users.

== See also ==
- List of ancient monuments in Rome

Preceded by Five-Columns Monument	Landmarks of Rome; Porticus Aemilia	Succeeded by Trajan's Market
