= List of museums in Italy =

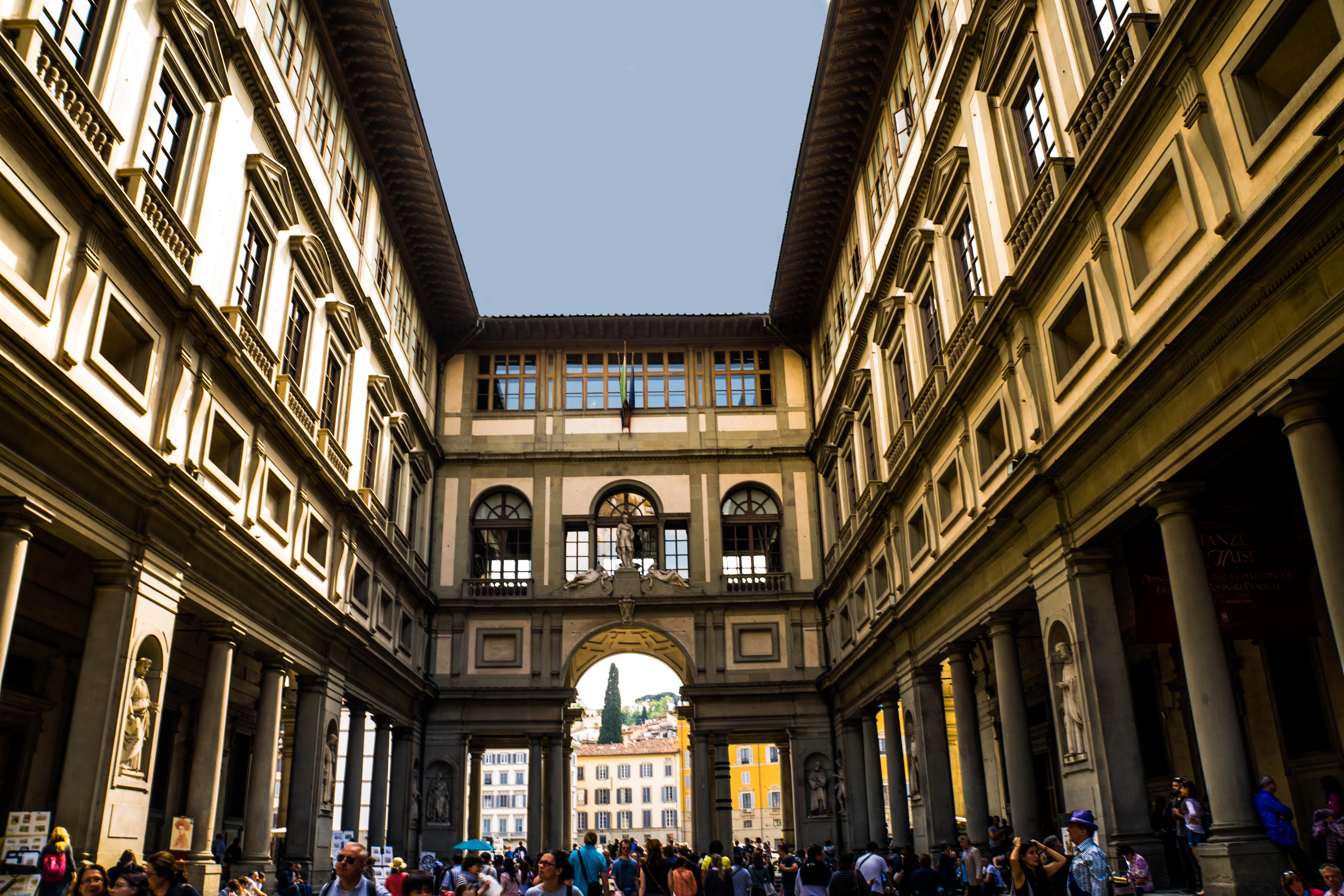
Uffizi Gallery in Florence

This is a list of museums in Italy.

== List of museums by city ==
- Alfedena
  - Museo civico aufidenate Antonio De Nino
- Amalfi
  - Museo della Carta di Amalfi
  - Diocesan Museum of Amalfi
- Ancona

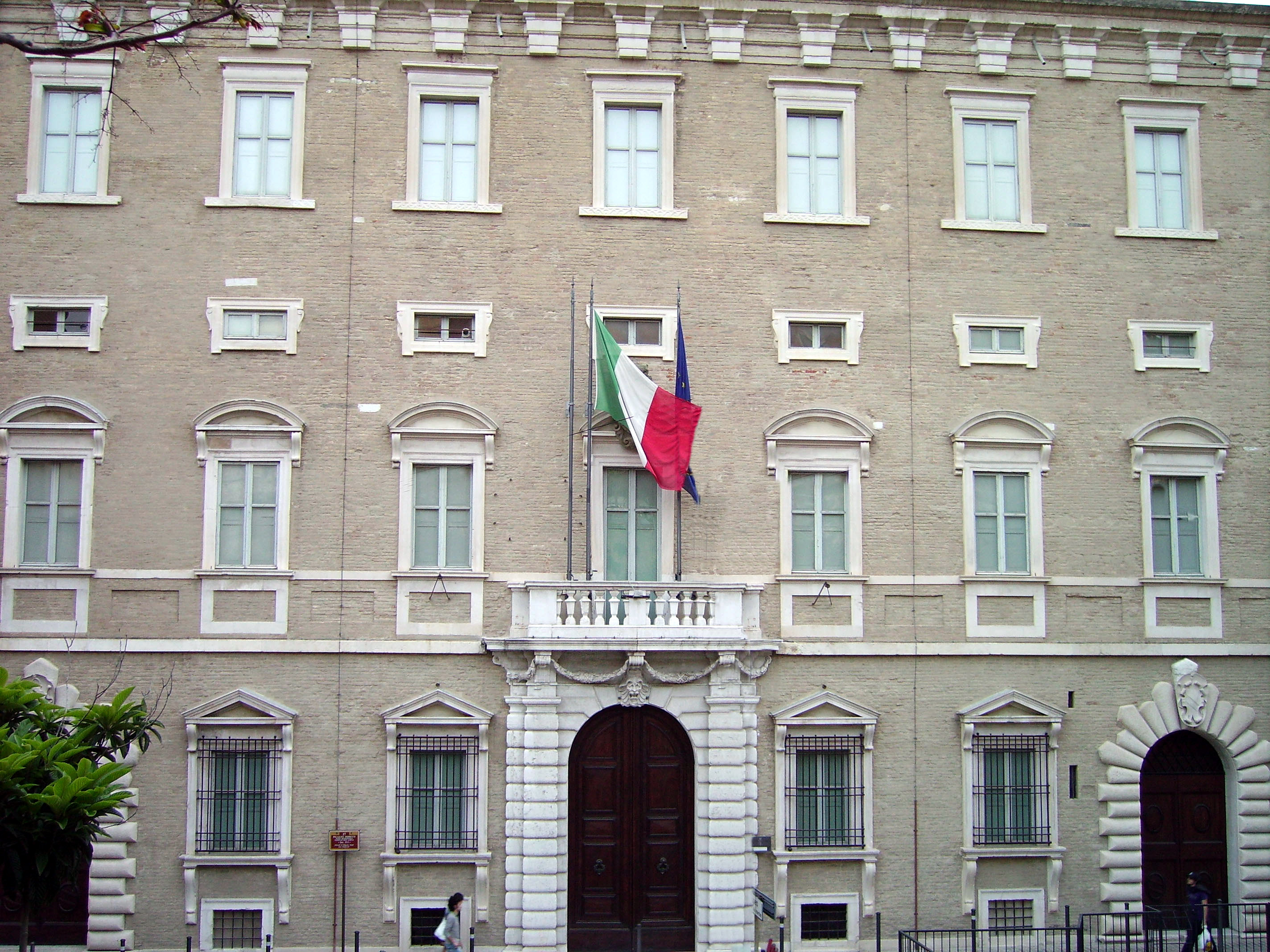
Museo Archeologico Nazionale in Ancona

  - Museo Archeologico Nazionale
  - Museo Omero
  - Pinacoteca Civica "Francesco Podesti"
- Aquileia
  - Museo Nazionale Paleocristiano
  - National Archaeological Museum
- Arezzo
  - Museo 'Ivan Bruschi'
- Ariano Irpino
  - Archaeological Museum of Ariano Irpino
  - Museum of Norman culture
  - Ariano Irpino Silver Museum
  - City Museum and Ceramics Gallery
  - Diocesan Museum of Ariano Irpino
- Ascoli Piceno
  - Diocesan museum of Ascoli Piceno, Italy
- Atri
  - Museo capitolare di Atri
- Avellino
  - Museo Irpino
- Bari
  - Museo di Castello Normanno Svevo
  - Pinacoteca Provinciale di Bari
- Bassano del Grappa
  - Poli Grappa Museum
- Benevento
  - Janua Museo delle Streghe
  - MUSA
  - Museo Capitolare
  - Museo d'Arte Contemporanea Sannio
  - Museo del Sannio
    - Palazzo Paolo V
    - Rocca dei Rettori
    - Santa Sofia's Church
  - Museo Diocesano di Benevento
  - Museo Egizio di Benevento
- Bergamo
  - Accademia Carrara
  - Museo Matris Domini
  - Museo di Scienze Naturali Enrico Caffi
- Bologna

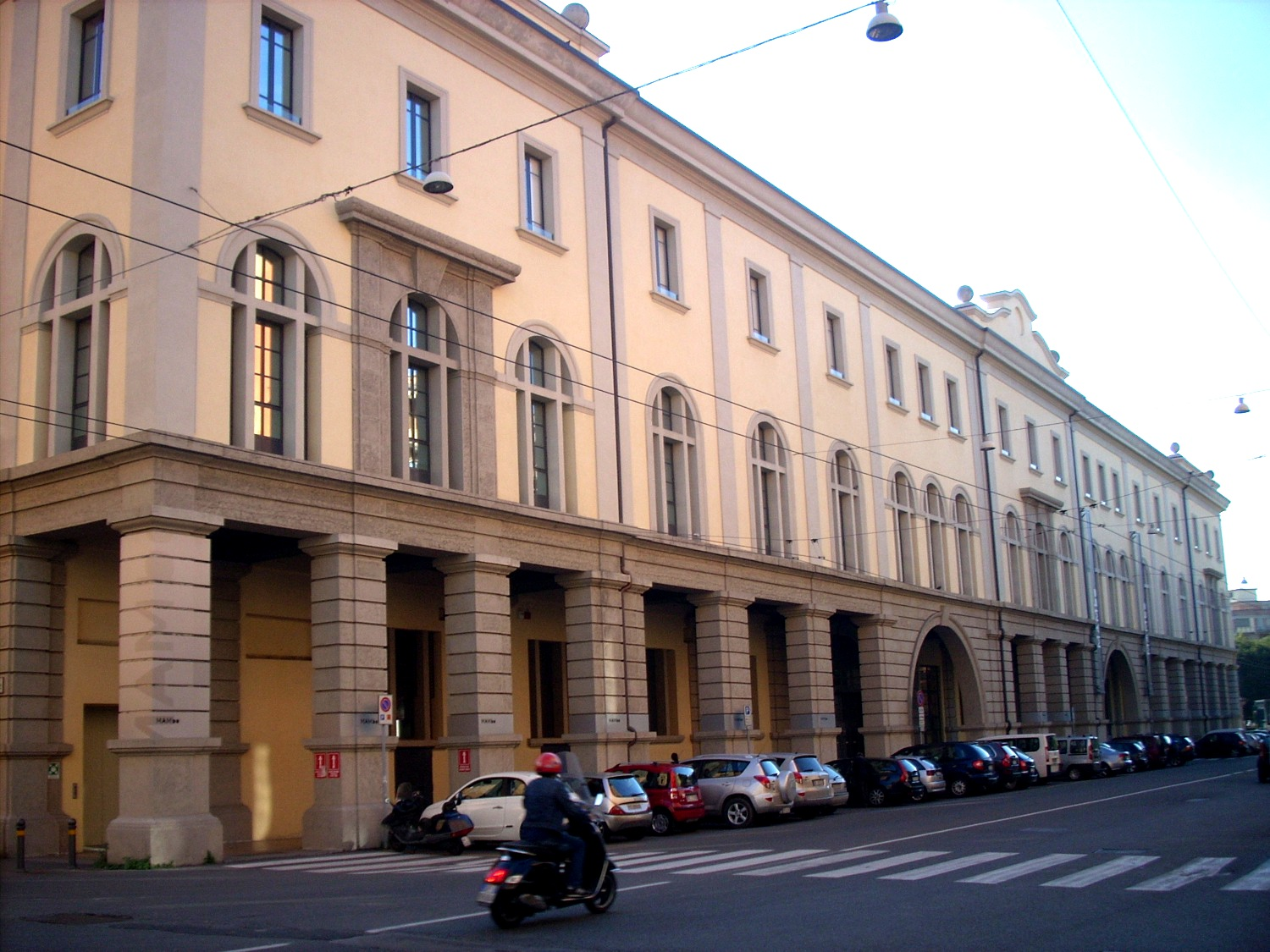
Museo d'Arte Moderna di Bologna

  - Archeological Museum of Bologna
  - Biblioteca comunale dell'Archiginnasio
  - Collezioni Comunali d'Arte
  - Ducati Museum
  - Museo Civico Medievale
  - Museo d'Arte Moderna di Bologna
  - Museo Morandi
  - Museo Ebraico di Bologna
  - Pinacoteca Nazionale di Bologna with an extra collection in Palazzo Pepoli Campogrande
  - Museo di Palazzo Poggi
- Bolzano
  - Museo Archeologico dell'Alto Adige
- Brescia

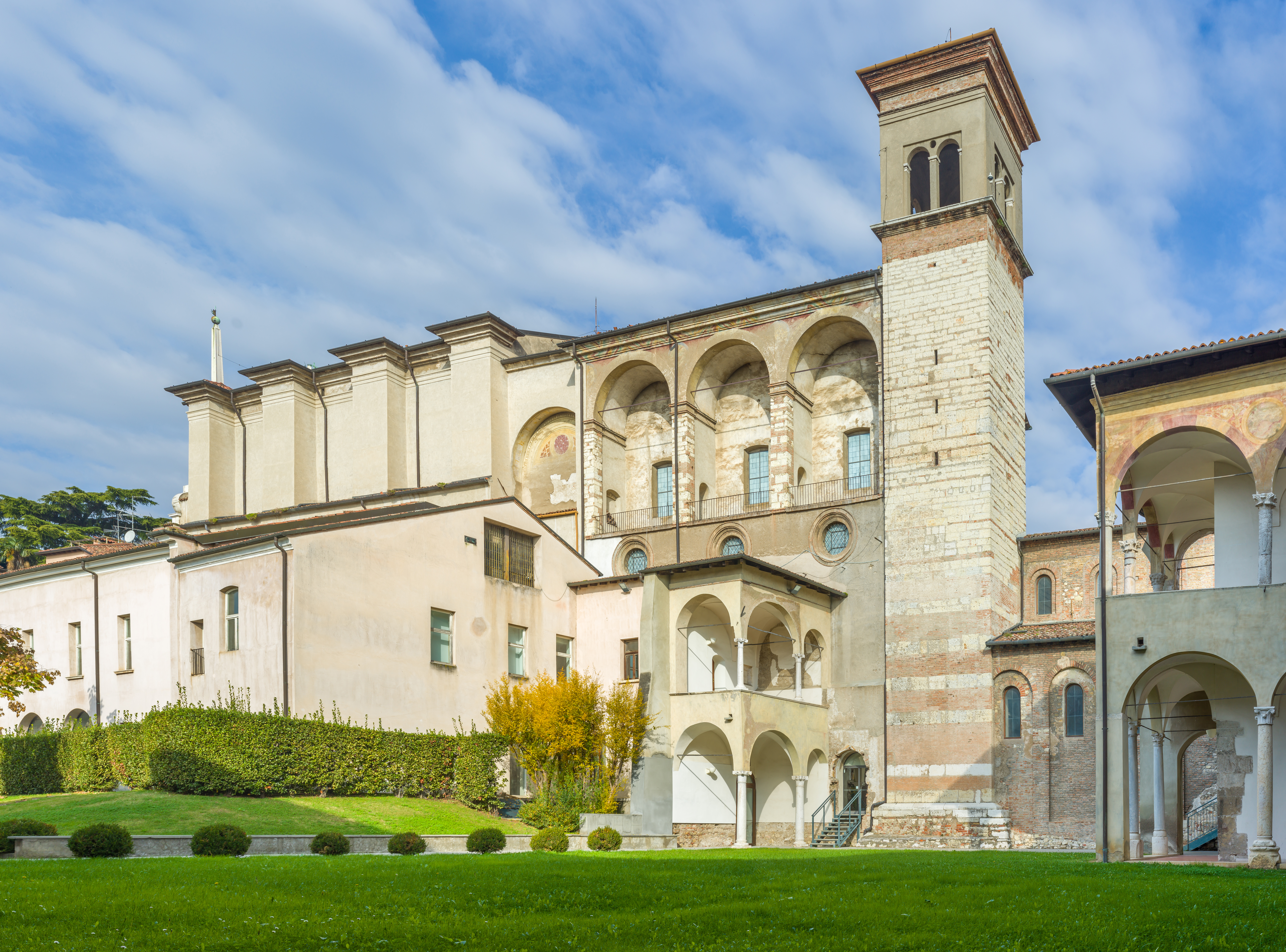
Museo di Santa Giulia in Brescia

  - Civica Raccolta del Disegno di Salò
  - National Museum of Photography
  - The Mille Miglia Museum
  - Museo di Santa Giulia
  - Pinacoteca Tosio Martinengo
  - Diocesan Museum of Brescia
  - Scavi archeologici di Palazzo Martinengo Cesaresco Novarino
- Brentonico
  - Museo del Fossile del Monte Baldo
- Cagliari
  - Museo di Bonaria
  - Museo di Fisica di Sardegna
  - Pinacoteca Nazionale di Cagliari
  - Sardinian Archaeological Museum
- Caltanissetta
  - Museo archeologico regionale di Caltanissetta
  - Museo diocesano di Caltanissetta
  - Museo mineralogico di Caltanissetta
  - Museo Tripisciano
- Campli
  - Museo Archeologico Nazionale di Campli
- Capua
  - Museo Campano
- Caserta

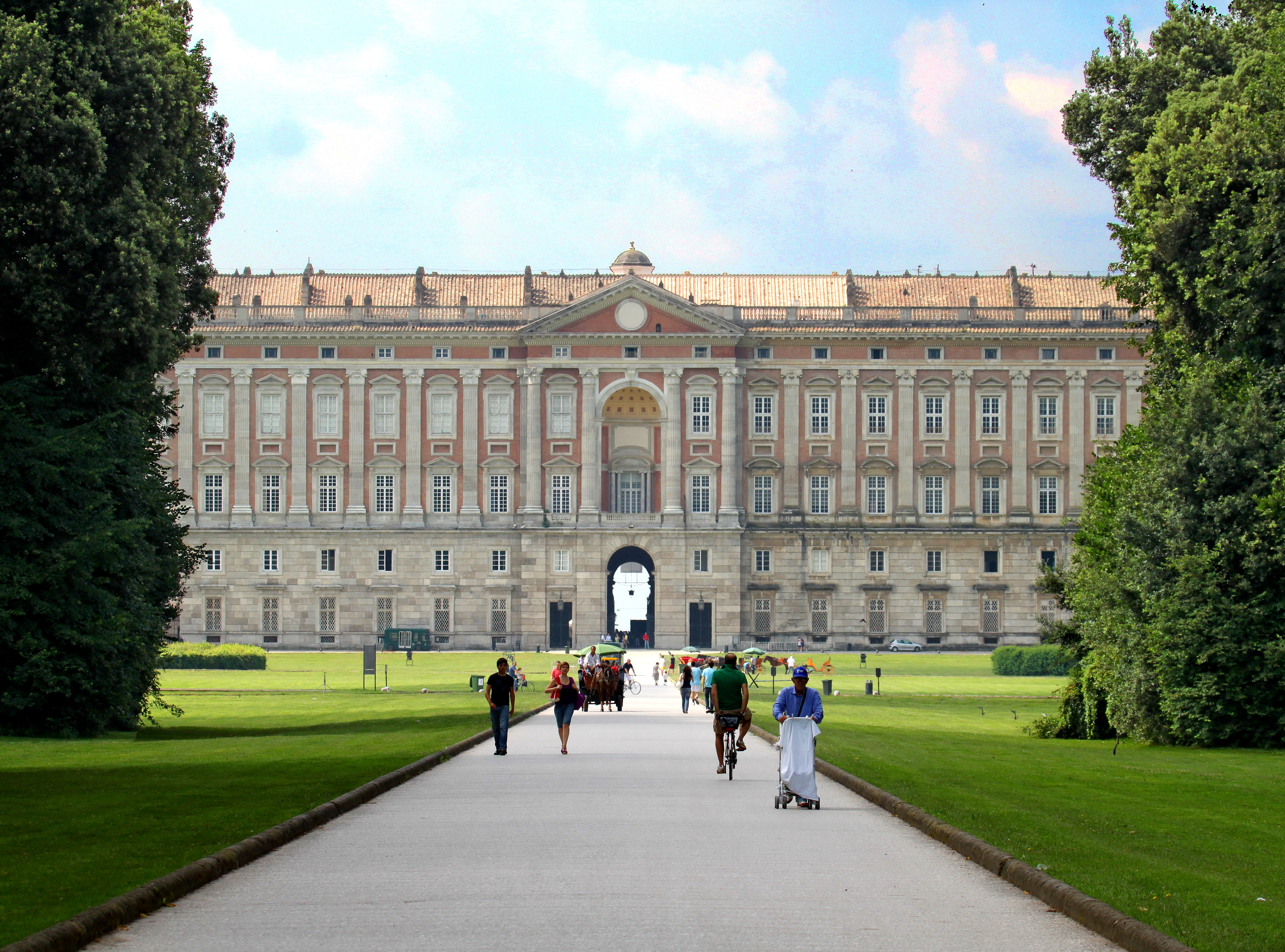
Royal Palace of Caserta

  - Caserta Palace
  - Museo della Seta
  - Museo Michelangelo
- Castel di Sangro
  - Museo civico aufidenate
- Castelfidardo
  - Museo del Risorgimento
- Catania
  - Museo Civico Belliniano
- Celano
  - Museo Paludi di Celano
  - Museo d'Arte Sacra della Marsica
- Cerchio
  - Museo civico di Cerchio
- Cesena
  - Museum of Malatestiana Library
  - Museum of Rocca Malatestiana
  - Galleria dei dipinti antichi della Fondazione Cassa di Risparmio di Cesena
  - Museo archeologico di Cesena
  - Museo della Centuriazione
  - Museo di scienze naturali di Cesena
  - Museo di storia dell'agricoltura
  - Pinacoteca Comunale di Cesena
- Chianciano
  - Chianciano Museum of art
- Chieti
  - Museo Archeologico Nazionale d'Abruzzo
- Cividale del Friuli
  - National Archaeological Museum of Cividale del Friuli
- Como
  - Museo Archeologico "Paolo Giovio"
  - Museo Liceo Classico 'A. Volta'
  - Tempio Voltiano
  - Villa Olmo
- Corfinio
  - Museo civico archeologico Antonio De Nino
- Crema
  - Civic Museum of Crema
- Cremona
  - Museo Civico Ala Ponzone
- Erice
  - Cordici Museum
- Fabriano
  - Paper and Watermark Museum Fabriano
- Ferrara
  - Museo Civico di Storia Naturale di Ferrara
  - Museo Nazionale di Spina
  - Museo dell'Ottocento
  - Museo Riminaldi
  - Pinacoteca Nazionale
  - Museum of Italian Judaism and the Shoah

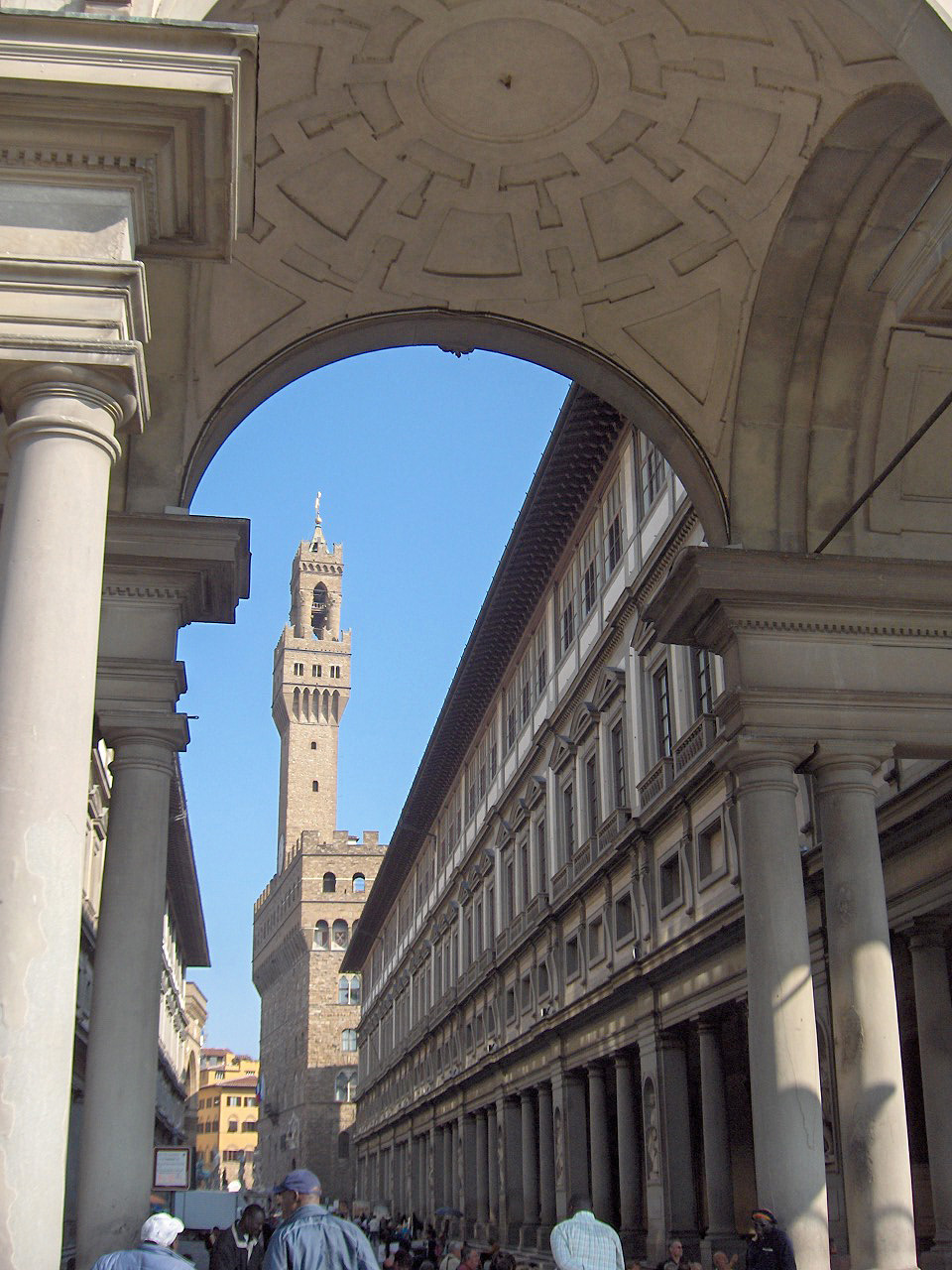
Galleria degli Uffizi in Florence

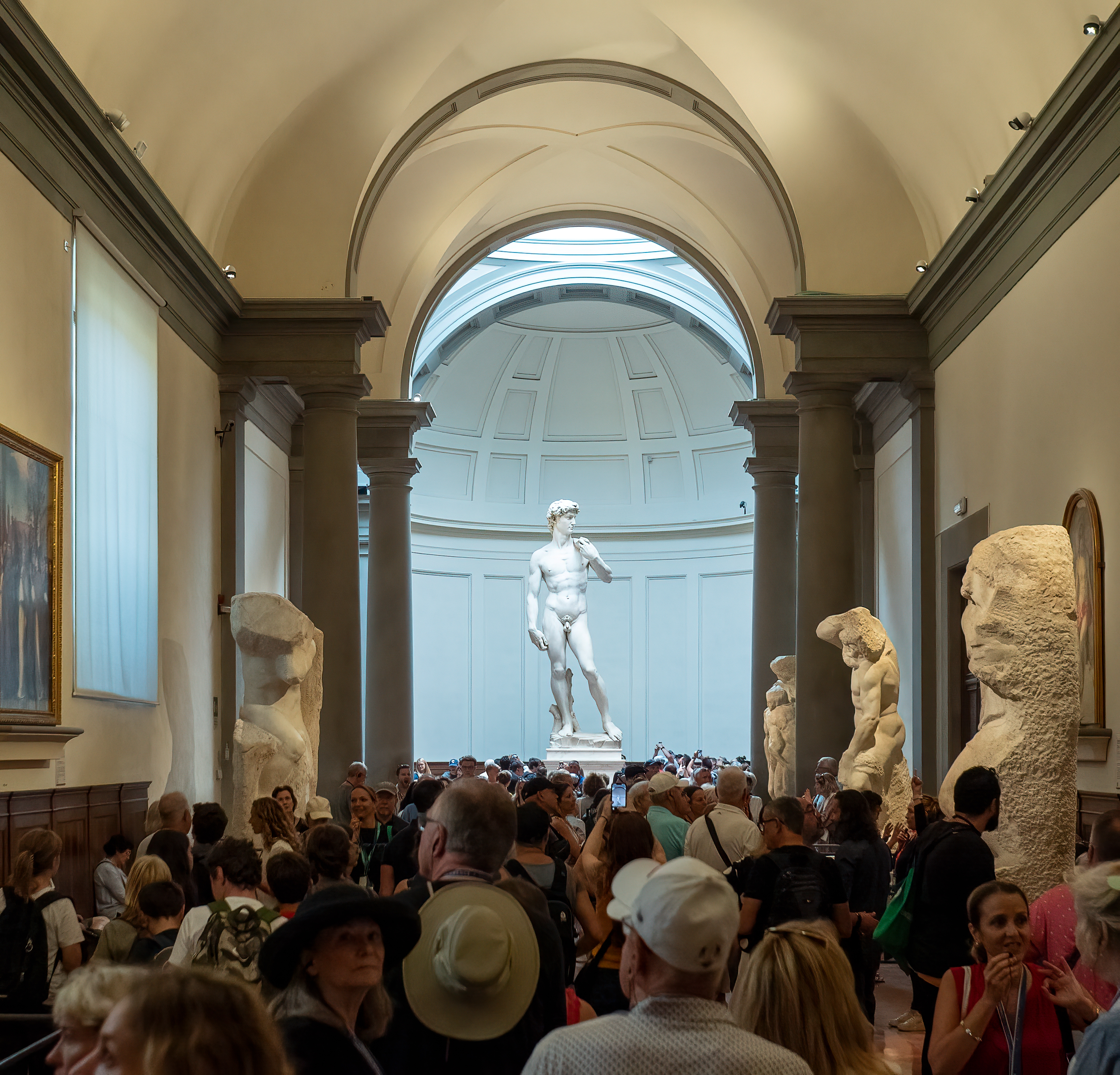
Galleria dell'Accademia in Florence

- Florence
  - Accademia di Belle Arti Firenze
  - Bargello
  - Casa Buonarroti
  - Casa Guidi
  - Cenacoli di Firenze
  - Galleria dell'Accademia
  - Museum of Musical Instruments
  - Galleria degli Uffizi
  - Institute and Museum of the History of Science
  - La Specola
  - Museo dell'Opera del Duomo
  - Museo Archeologico Etrusco
  - Museo Bardini
  - Museo del Calcio
  - Museo Nazionale Alinari della Fotografia
  - Museo Nazionale di San Marco
  - Museo di Storia Naturale di Firenze
  - Museo Ideale Leonardo da Vinci
  - National Archaeological Museum
  - Opificio delle pietre dure
  - Palazzo Pitti
    - Galleria Palatina
    - Gallery of Modern Art
    - Royal Apartments
    - Silver Museum
    - Costume Gallery
    - Carriages Museum
    - Carriages Museum
    - Boboli Gardens
  - Palazzo Vecchio
  - Vasari Corridor
  - Museo Stibbert
  - Museo Horne
  - Museo Marino Marini
  - Museo Ebraico
  - Gino Bartali Museum
  - Museo Salvatore Ferragamo
  - Bellini Museum
  - Palazzo Strozzi
  - Palazzo Medici Riccardi
  - Ospedale degli Innocenti
  - Museum of Bigallo
  - Cappelle Medicee
- Gaeta
  - Mausoleum of Licius Munatius Plancus
- Gallipoli, Apulia
  - Diocesan Museum of Gallipoli (Italy)
- Genoa

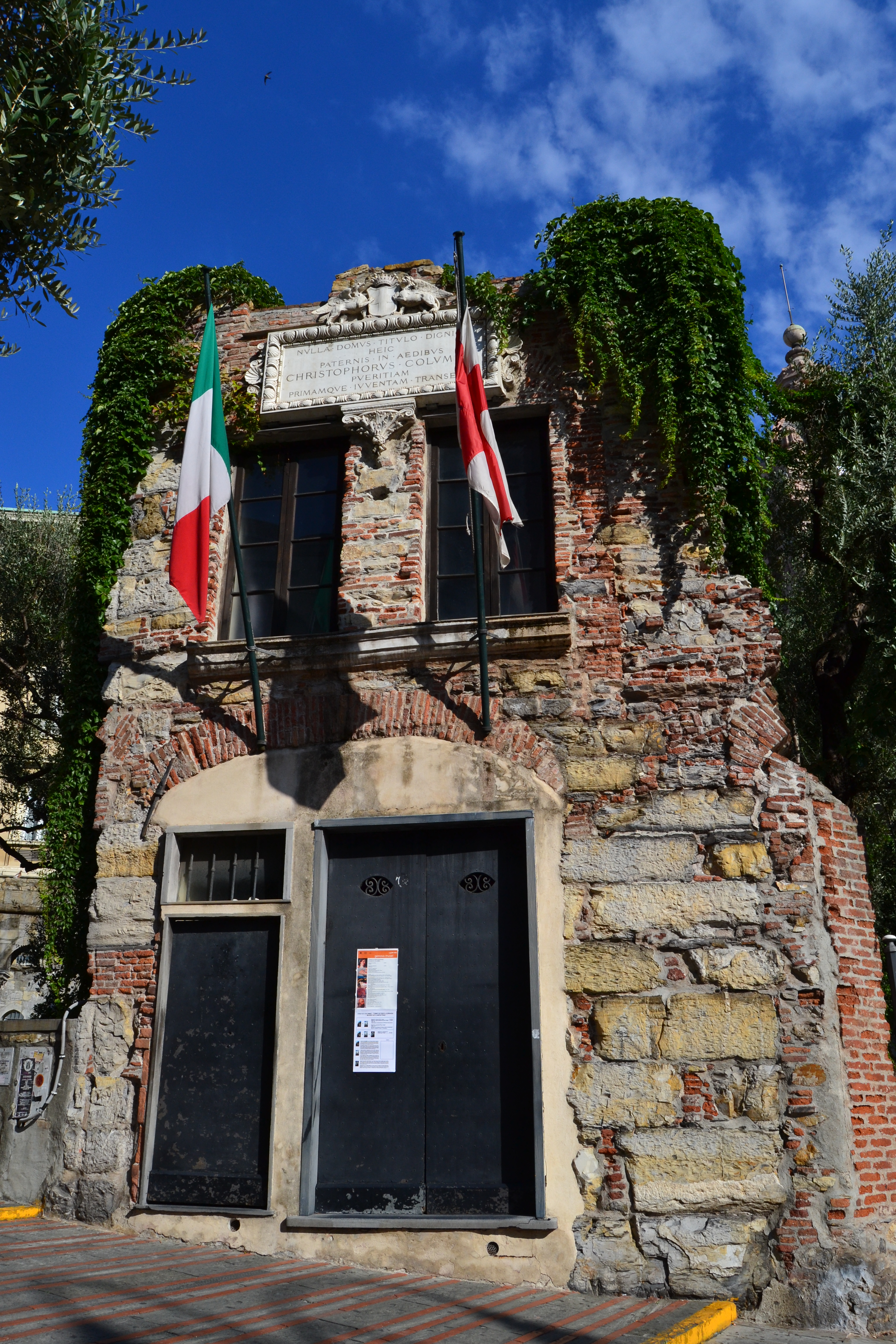
Christopher Columbus House in Genoa

  - Christopher Columbus House Porta Soprana e Chiostro di Sant'Andrea in Piazza Dante (Genova)
  - Castello d'Albertis - Museo delle Culture del Mondo
  - Civico Museo Biblioteca dell'Attore
  - Complesso Monumentale della Lanterna di Genova
  - Galata Museo del Mare
  - GAM - Galleria d'Arte Moderna
  - Galleria Nazionale di Palazzo Spinola UNESCO World Heritage
  - Museum and Store|Genoa Museum and Store Museo della Storia del Genoa - Football (soccer) museum
  - Museo Civico di Storia Naturale Giacomo Doria
  - Museo d'Arte Orientale Edoardo Chiossone
  - Museo dell'Accademia Ligustica di Belle Arti
  - Museo della Città
  - Museo del Risorgimento e istituto mazziniano
  - Museo del Tesoro di San Lorenzo nella Cattedrale di San Lorenzo (Genova)
  - Museo di Archeologia Ligure
  - Museo d'Arte Contemporanea Villa Croce
  - Museo di chimica - Università degli Studi di Genova - Viale Benedetto XV
  - Museo diffuso del jeans
  - Museo Diocesano (Genova)
  - Museo di Palazzo Reale UNESCO World Heritage
  - Museo di Sant'Agostino
  - Musei di Strada Nuova - Palazzo Bianco (Genoa) UNESCO World Heritage
  - Musei di Strada Nuova - Palazzo Rosso UNESCO World Heritage
  - Musei di Strada Nuova - Palazzo Doria-Tursi UNESCO World Heritage
  - Museo ebraico
  - Museo Giannettino Luxoro
  - Museo Navale di Pegli in Villa Doria Centurione
  - Museo Nazionale dell'emigrazione italiana
  - Raccolte Frugone
  - Viadelcampo29rosso
  - Villa del Principe
  - Wolfosoniana
- Grosseto
  - Museo di storia naturale della Maremma
  - Museo archeologico e d'arte della Maremma
  - Museo Collezione Gianfranco Luzzetti
- Guardiagrele
  - Museo del duomo di Guardiagrele
- Imola
  - Museo di Palazzo Tozzoni
- La Spezia
  - Museo Civico "Amadeo Lia"
  - Museo Nazionale dei Trasporti
  - Museo Tecnico Navale
- L'Aquila
  - Museo Archeologico di S. Maria dei Raccomandati
  - Museo Nazionale d'Abruzzo
- Latina
  - Galleria Civica d'Arte Moderna e Contemporanea di Latina
- Lanciano
  - Museo diocesano di Lanciano
- Livorno
  - Museo Mascagnano
  - Museo di Storia Naturale del Mediterraneo
- Lucca
  - Museo Nazionale Guinigi
  - Museo Nazionale di Palazzo Mansi
  - Museo e Pinacoteca Nazionale
- Macerata
  - Museo di Palazzo Ricci
  - Museo delle Carrozze
- Mantua

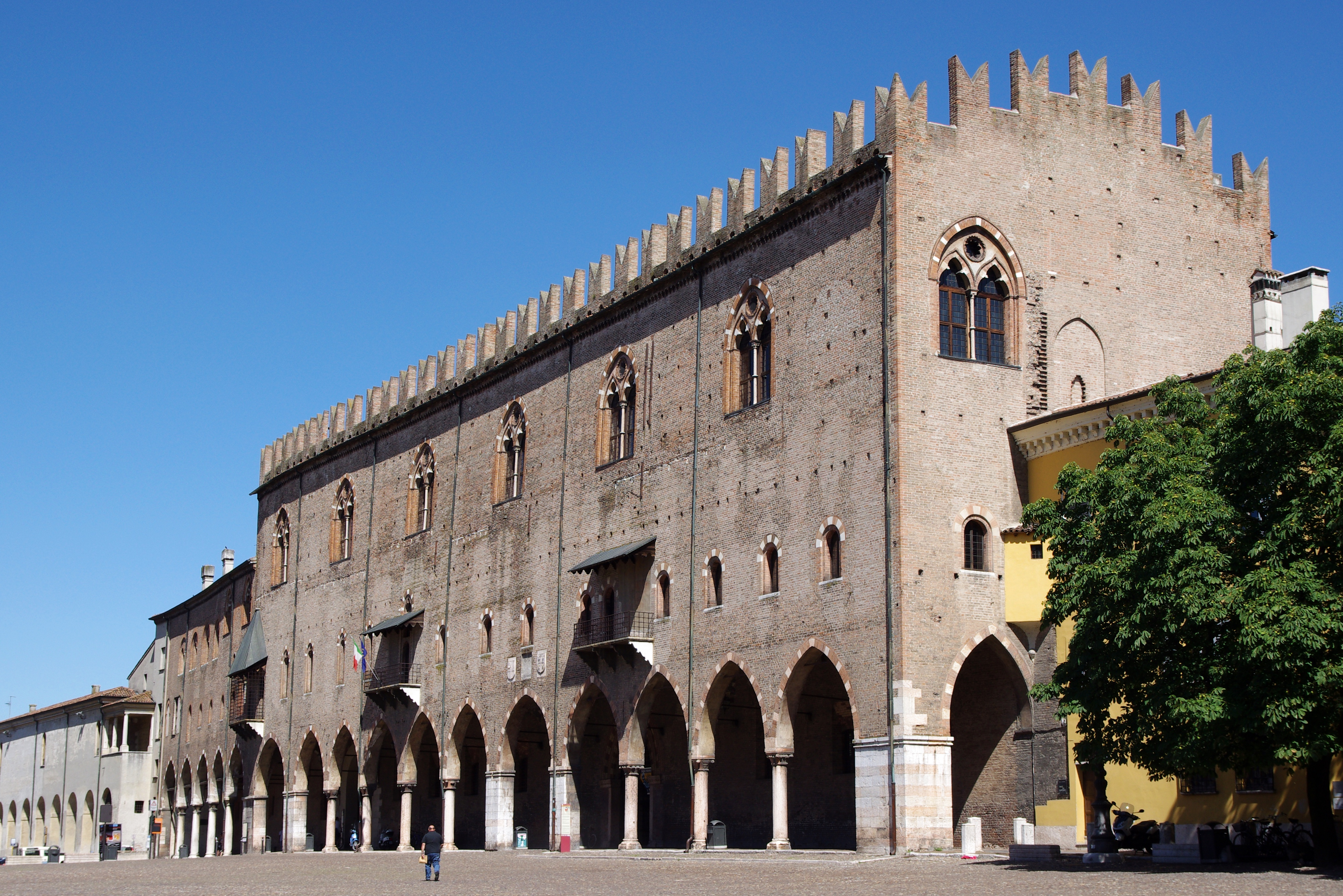
Museo di Palazzo Ducale in Mantua

  - Museo di Palazzo Ducale
  - Museo di Palazzo Te
- Matera
  - Museo Nazionale d'Arte Medievale e Moderna della Basilicata
- Melfi
  - Museo Nazionale del Melfese
- Merano
  - Palais Mamming Museum
- Messina
  - Musei, Gallerie e Aree Archeologiche
  - Museo Regionale di Messina
  - Museo d’Arte Contemporanea Capo d’Orlando
- Milan

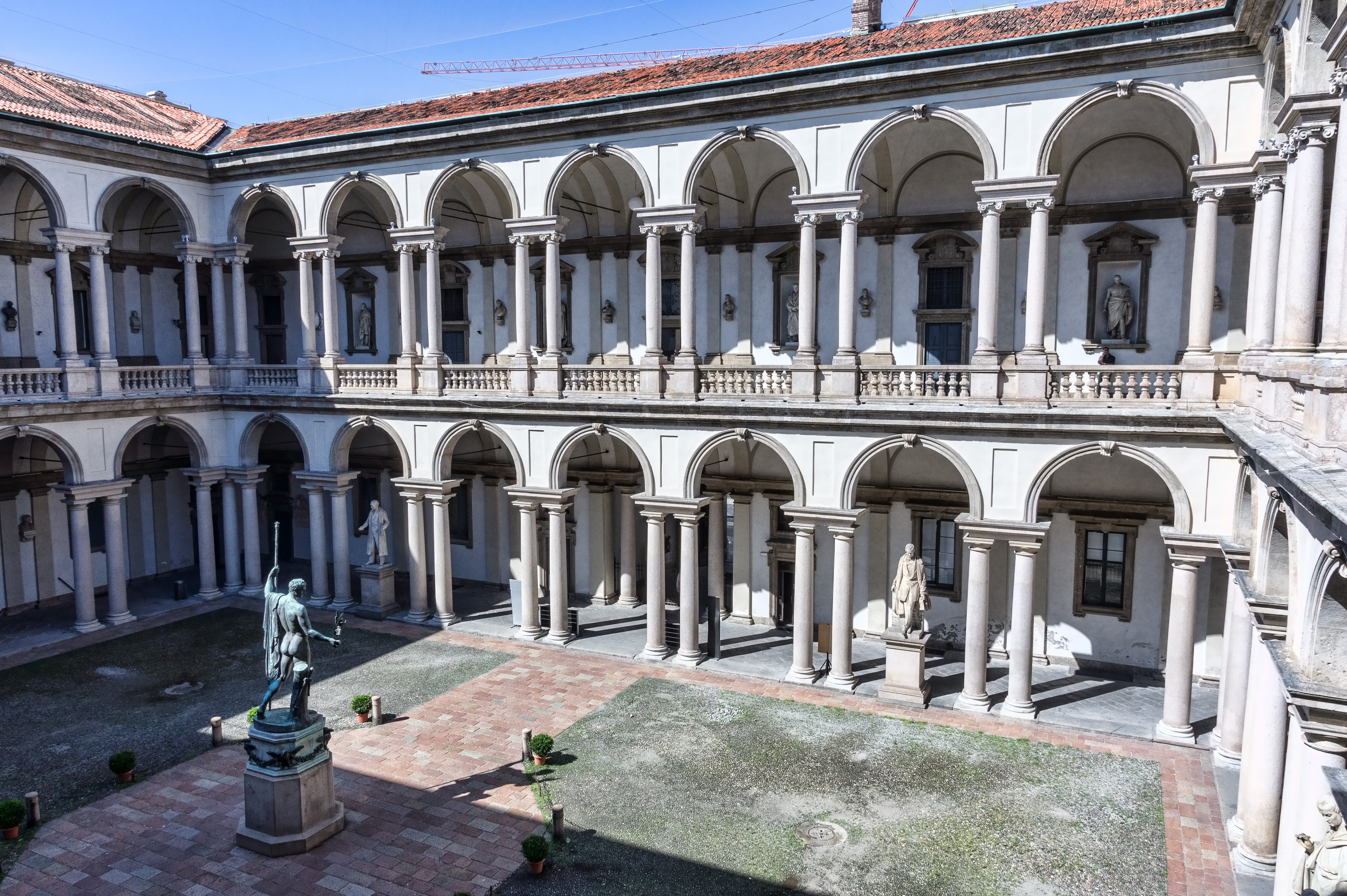
Pinacoteca di Brera in Milan

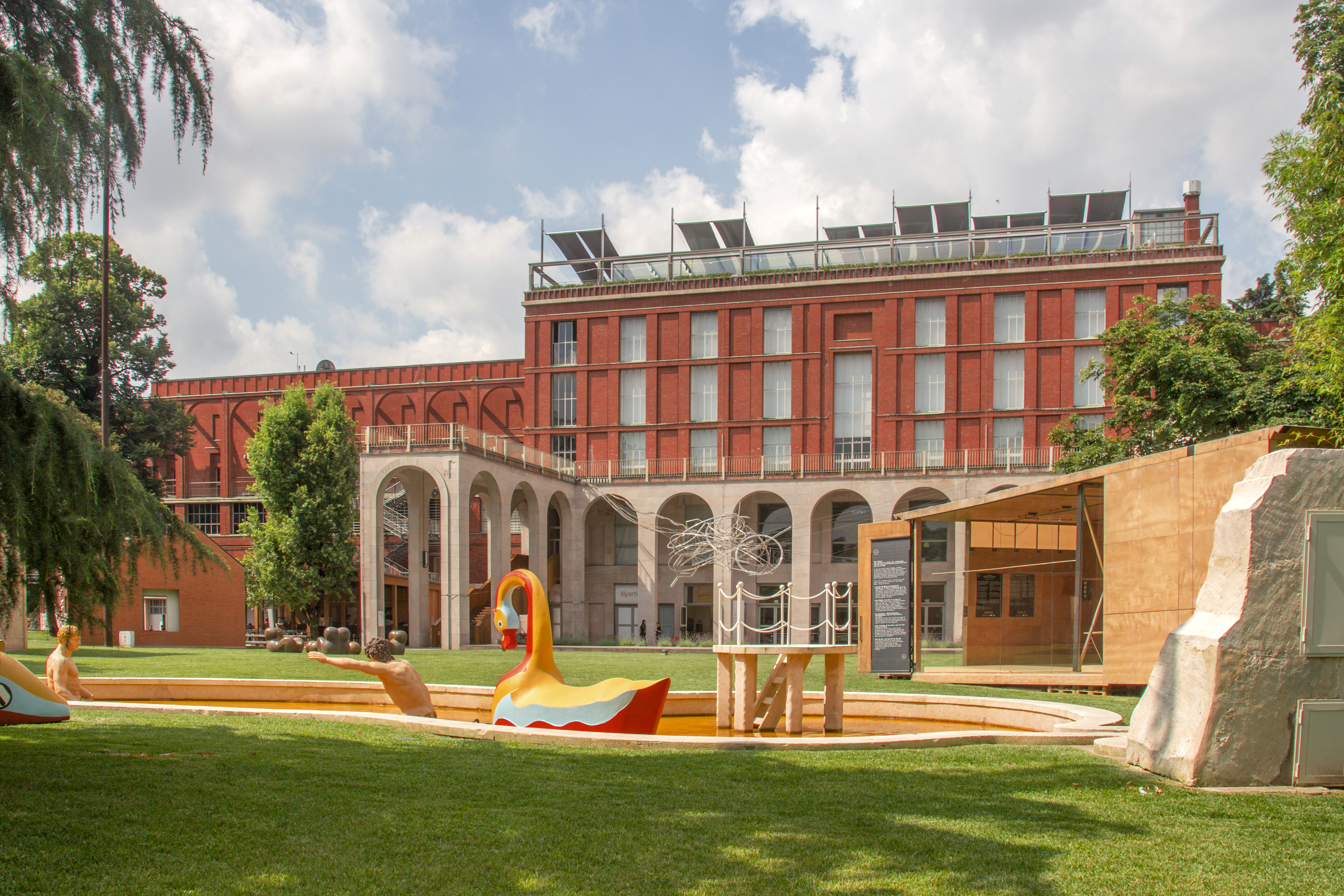
Triennale di Milano

  - Archaeological Museum (Milan)
  - Bagatti Valsecchi Museum
  - Biblioteca Ambrosiana
  - Casa del Manzoni
  - Civic Aquarium of Milan
  - Sforza Castle museum complex
    - Egyptian Museum
    - Museum of Musical Instruments
    - The Museum of Ancient Art
    - Sforza Castle Pinacoteca
    - Applied Arts Collection
    - Furniture & Wooden Sculpture Museum
  - Galleria d'Arte Moderna
  - Natural History Museum of Milan
  - Museo Diocesano di Milano
  - Gallerie di Piazza Scala
  - Museo Poldi Pezzoli
  - Museum of the Twentieth Century
  - Museo del Risorgimento
  - Museo della Scienza e della Tecnologia Leonardo da Vinci
  - Padiglione d'Arte Contemporanea
  - Museo Storico Alfa Romeo
  - Museo Teatrale alla Scala
  - Pinacoteca di Brera
  - Triennale di Milano
- Modena
  - State museum gallery of Modena, Palazzo dei Musei
  - Archaeological & Ethnological Museum
  - Galleria Estense
  - Museo Este Headstones
- Montefortino
  - Pinacoteca Civica Fortunato Duranti
- Montesarchio
  - Castello di Montesarchio
- Montopoli di Sabina
  - Modern Automata Museum
- Monza
  - Museo Serpero
- Naples

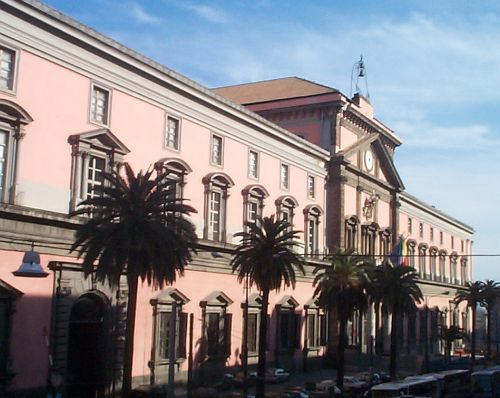
Museo Archeologico Nazionale Napoli

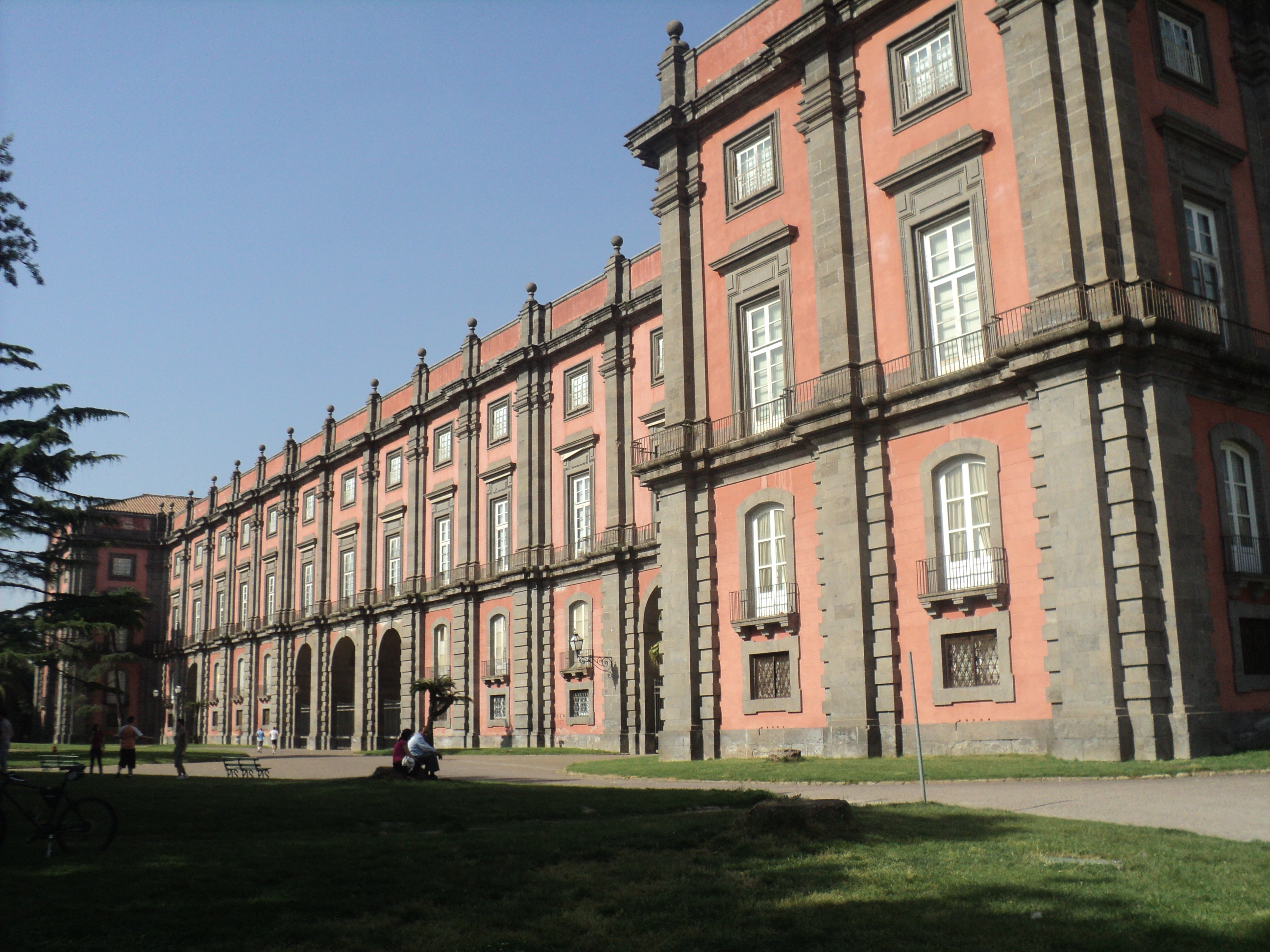
Museo di Capodimonte in Naples

  - Cappella Sansevero
  - Certosa di San Martino
  - Citta della Scienza
  - Coral Jewellery Museum
  - Museo Archeologico Nazionale Napoli
  - Museo Civico Filangieri
  - Museo delle Ferrovie
  - Museo di Capodimonte
  - Museo di Palazzo Reale
  - Museo Mustilli
  - Museo del Tesoro di San Gennaro
  - Museo Pignatelli
  - National Museum of Ceramics
  - Palazzo delle Arti di Napoli
  - Palazzo Zevallos Stigliano
  - Pietrarsa railway museum
  - Pinacoteca di Napoli
  - Secret Museum, Naples
  - Villa Floridiana
  - Zoological Museum of Naples
- Orvieto
  - Museo Archeologico di Orvieto
  - Museo dell'Opera del Duomo di Orvieto
- Padua
  - Diocesan Museum of Padua
  - Musei Civici di Padova
  - Nuovi Musei di Palazzo Zuckerman
- Palermo

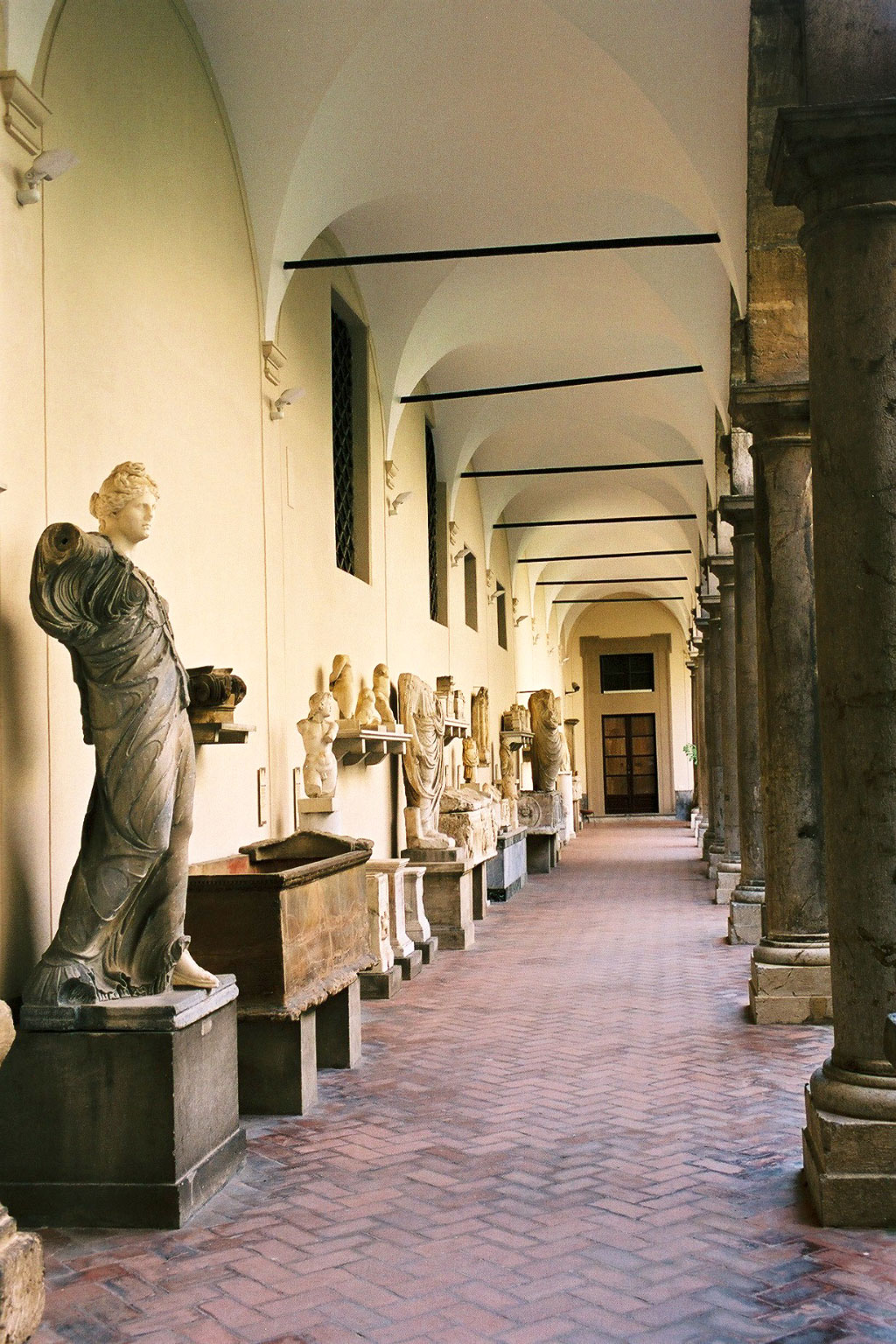
Regional Archeological Museum Antonio Salinas in Palermo

  - Regional Archeological Museum Antonio Salinas
  - Museo Diocesano
  - Museo Palazzo Steri
  - Zisa
- Palestrina
  - Museo Archeologico Nazionale
- Palmi
  - Casa della cultura museum complex:
    - Museo etnografico "Raffaele Corso"
    - Antiquarium "Nicola De Rosa"
    - Museo musicale "Francesco Cilea e Nicola Manfroce"
    - Gipsoteca "Michele Guerrisi"
    - Pinacoteca "Leonida ed Albertina Repaci"
  - Tempio di San Fantino
  - Villa Repaci
- Parma
  - Fondazione Magnani-Rocca
  - Galleria nazionale di Parma
  - Museum House of Arturo Toscanini
  - Museo Lombardi
  - Pinacoteca Stuard
- Pavia
  - Museo Civico, Pavia, including Pinacoteca Malaspina
  - University History Museum, University of Pavia
- Pergola
  - Museo dei Bronzi Dorati
- Perugia
  - Galleria Nazionale dell'Umbria
  - National Museum of Umbrian Archaeology
  - Post Science Center
- Pesaro
  - Museo Oliveriano
  - Civic Museum of Palazzo Mosca
  - Villa Imperiale of Pesaro
- Pescara
  - Museo delle Genti d'Abruzzo
  - Museo d'Arte Moderna Vittoria Colonna
  - Birthplace of Gabriele D'Annunzio Museum
  - Museo Paparella Treccia Devlet
- Piacenza
  - Musei Civici
  - Museum of National History
  - Galleria Ricci
- Piemonte
  - Museo Regionale di Scienze Naturali Regione Piemonte
- Pisa

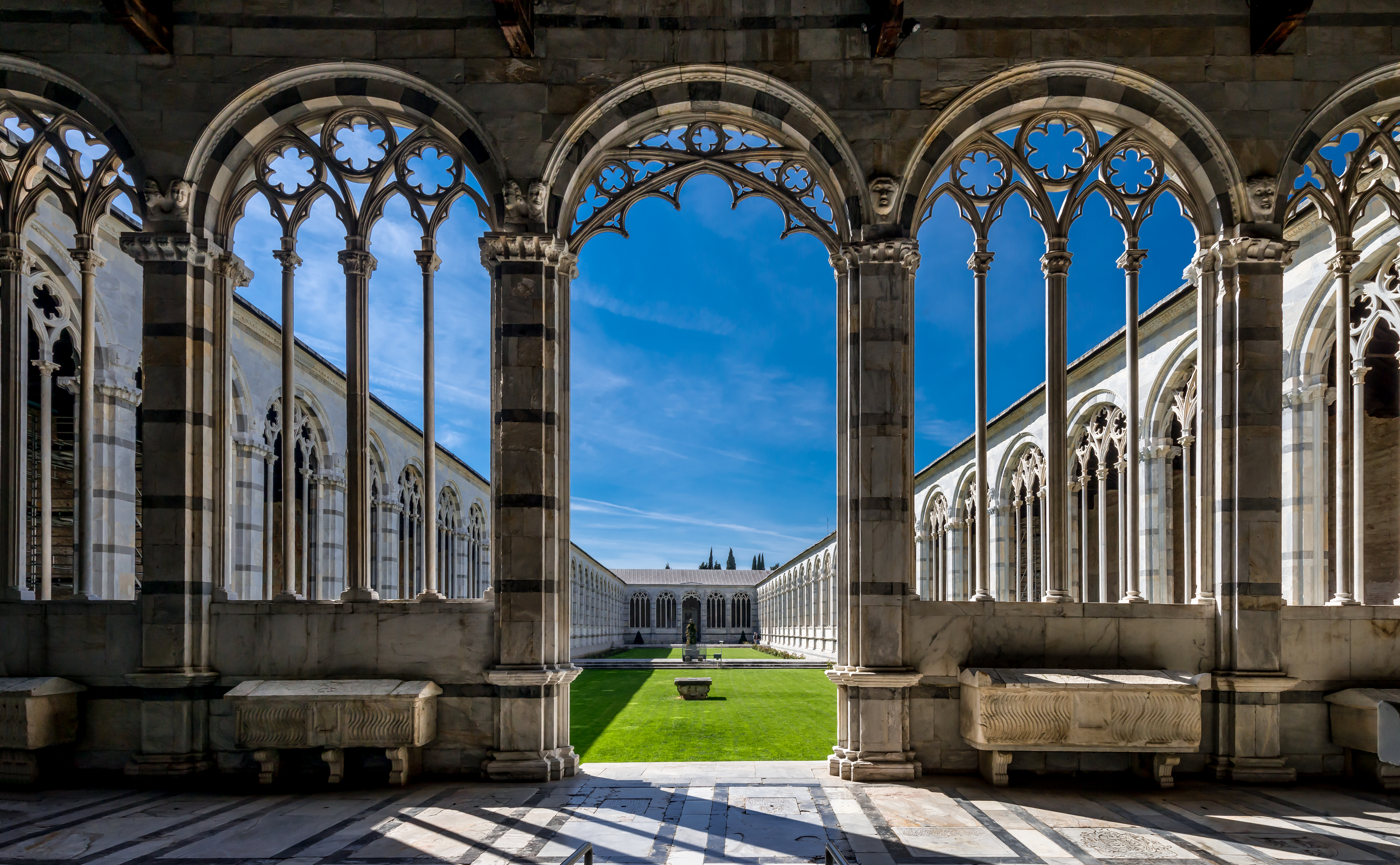
Camposanto Monumentale in Pisa

  - Camposanto Monumentale
  - Certosa di Pisa
  - Museo Nazionale di Palazzo Reale
  - Museo Nazionale di San Matteo
  - Museo Nazionale degli Strumenti per il Calcolo
  - Museo dell'Opera del Duomo
  - Museo delle Sinopie
  - Museo di Storia Naturale e del Territorio dell'Università
  - Museo storia naturale di Pisa
- Popoli
  - Taverna ducale
- Poppi
  - Museo e Arboreto Carlo Siemoni, Poppi
- Portogruaro
  - Museo Nazionale Concordiese
- Possagno
  - Gypsotheca e Museo Antonio Canova
- Potenza
  - Museo Archeologico Nazionale
  - Museo Archeologico Provinciale
- Pozzuoli
  - Campi Flegrei
  - Museo Diocesano di Pozzuoli
- Prato
  - Cathedral museum of Prato
  - Centro per l'arte contemporanea Luigi Pecci
  - Galleria di Palazzo degli Alberti
  - Museo della Deportazione
- Predazzo
  - Museo Geologico - Predazzo
- Priverno
  - Giardino di Archimede
- Quarto d'Altino
  - National Archaeological Museum of Altino
- Ravenna

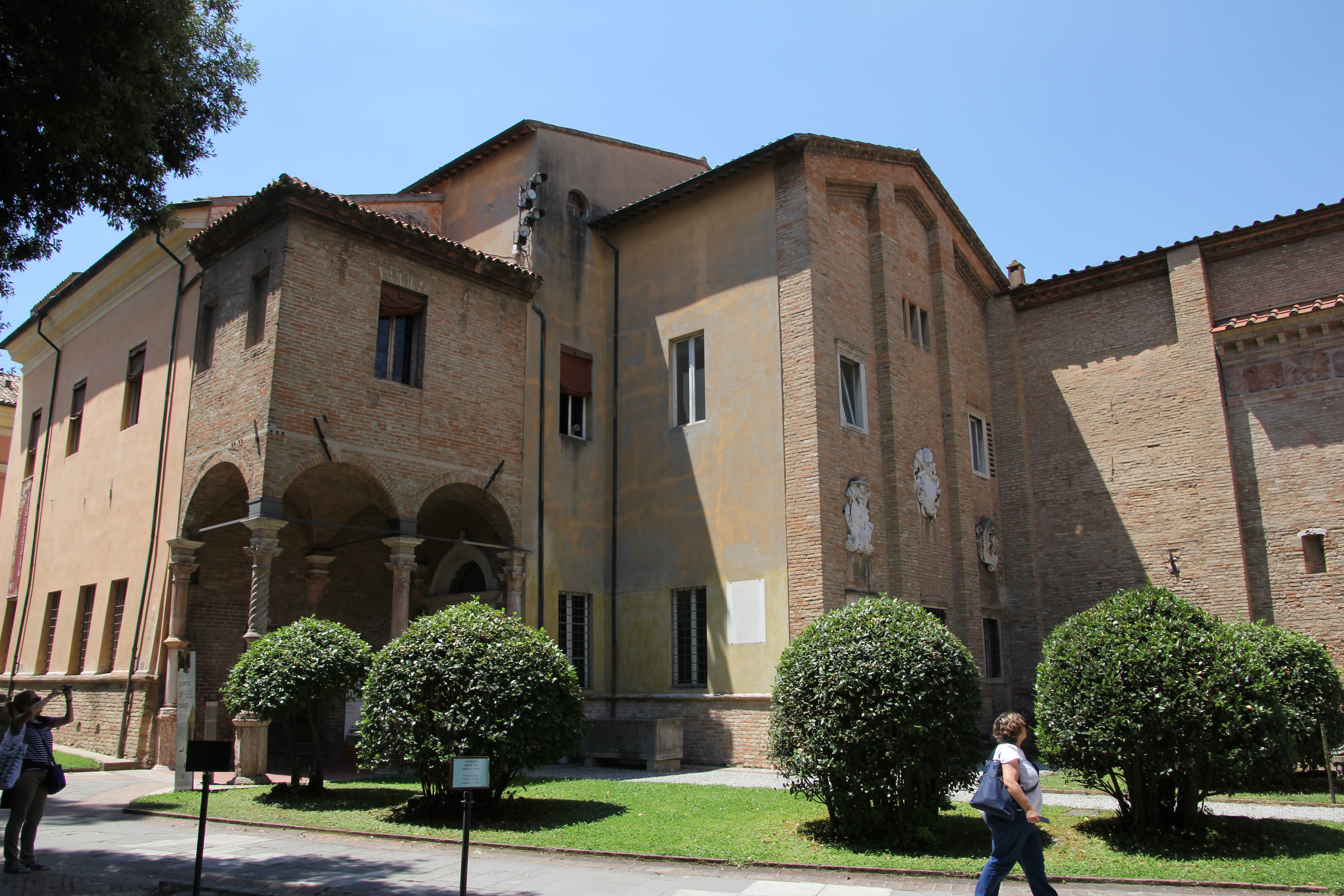
Museo Nazionale di Ravenna

  - Archiepiscopal Museum, Ravenna
  - Museo d'Arte della Città di Ravenna
  - Museo Nazionale di Ravenna
- Reggio Calabria
  - Museo Nazionale della Magna Grecia
  - Museo dello Strumento Musicale
  - Pinacoteca Comunale
- Rimini
  - Museo della Città
  - National Motorcycle Museum
- Rome

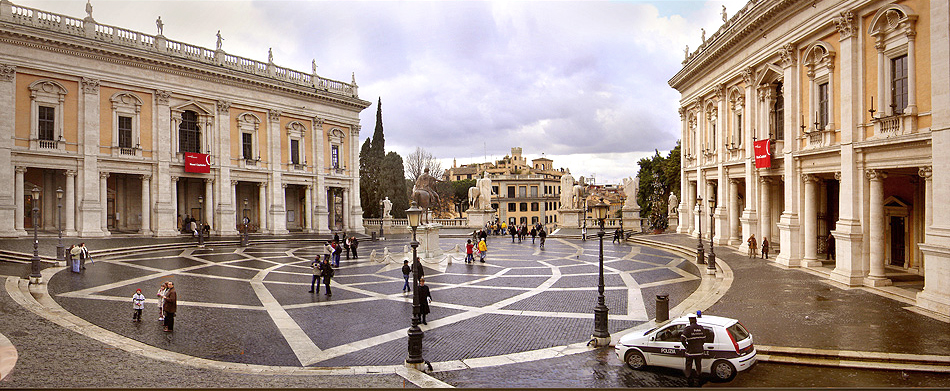
Capitoline Museums in Rome

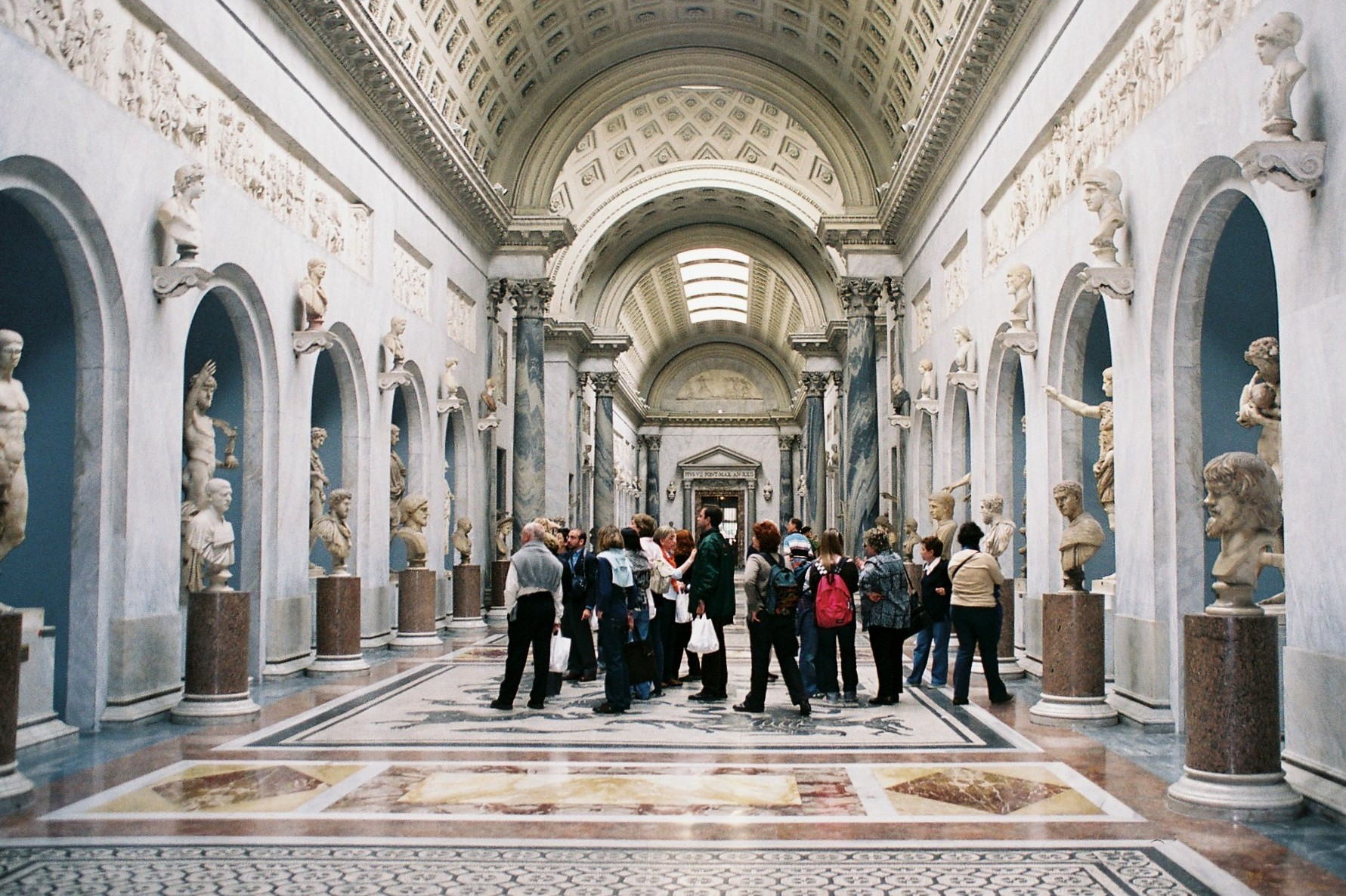
Vatican Museums in Rome

  - Capitoline Museums
  - Castel Sant'Angelo
  - Centrale Montemartini
  - Doria Pamphilj Gallery
  - Enrico Fermi Center
  - Forum Antiquarium
  - Galleria Borghese
  - Galleria Colonna
  - Galleria Nazionale d'Arte Antica
  - Gallery of St. Luke Academy
  - Geological Museum Rome
  - Keats-Shelley Memorial House
  - Mausoleum of Augustus
  - Mercati di Trajan
  - Monument to Vittorio Emanuele II
  - Museo dell'Alto Medioevo
  - Museo dell'Ara Pacis
  - Museo dell'Arte Classica
  - Museo d'Arte Contemporanea
  - Museo Atelier Canova Tadolini
  - Museo dei Bambini
  - Museo Barracco di Scultura Antica
  - Museo Carlo Bilotti
  - Museo Civico di Zoologia
  - Museo del Corso
  - Museo Ebraico
  - Museo della Mura
  - Museo Napoleonico
  - Museo nazionale del Palazzo di Venezia
  - Museo delle Origini
  - Museo Pietro Canonica
  - Museo del Risorgimento
  - Museo di Roma a Palazzo Braschi
  - Museo di Roma in Trastevere
  - Museo Storico della Liberazione
  - Museo del Vicino Oriente
  - Museum of Roman Civilization
  - National Etruscan Museum
  - National Gallery of Modern Art
  - National Museum of Oriental Art
  - National Museum of Pasta Foods
  - Museo Nazionale Romano – A set of national museums in Rome; four branches across the city
    - Baths of Diocletian
    - Crypta Balbi
    - Palazzo Altemps
    - Palazzo Massimi alle Terme
  - Pigorini National Museum of Prehistory and Ethnography
  - Pontifical Museum of Christian Antiquities
  - Porta San Paolo
  - Spada Gallery
  - Torlonia Museum
  - Vatican Museums
  - Villa Farnesina
  - Villa di Massenzio
- Rovereto
  - Museo Civico Rovereto
- Salerno
  - Museo Archeologico Provinciale
  - Museo Didattico della Acuola Medica Salernitana
  - Museo Diocesano di Salerno
  - Museo Provinciale della Ceramica
  - Pinacoteca Provinciale
- Saltara
  - Museo del Bali
- Saronno
  - Museo Giuseppe Gianetti
  - Museo delle Industrie e del Lavoro del Saronnese
- Sassari
  - Museo del Banco di Sardegna e Banca di Sassari
- Scapoli
  - Museo della Zampogna
- Selva di Cadore
  - Museo Paleontologico e Archeologico Vittorino Cazzetta
- Siena

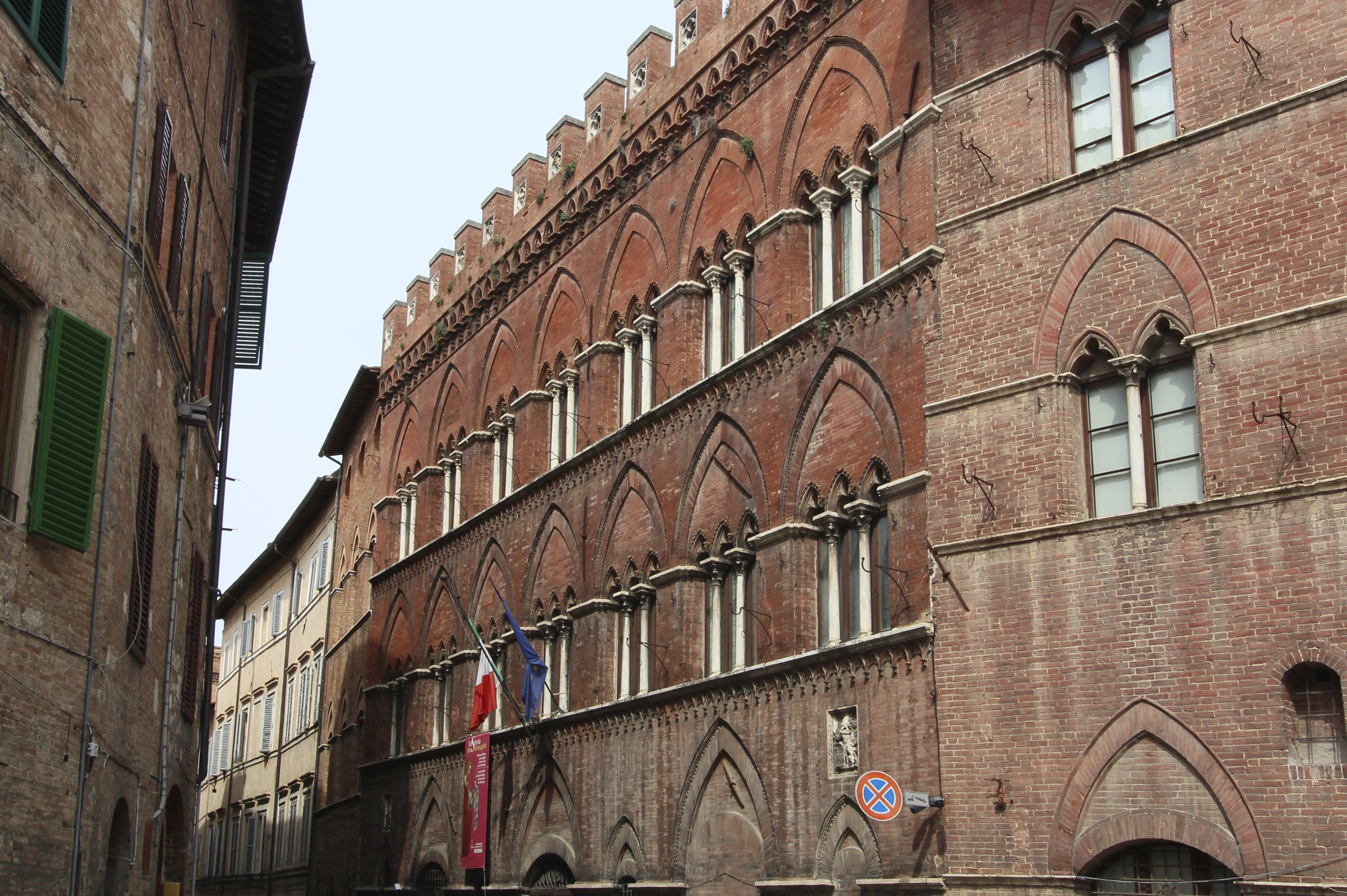
Pinacoteca Nazionale di Siena

  - Museo dell'Opera Metropolitana del Duomo
  - Pinacoteca Nazionale di Siena
- Siracusa
  - Museo Archeologico Regionale Paolo Orsi
  - Museo di Palazzo Bellomo
- Sulmona
  - Museo diocesano di Sulmona
- Teramo
  - Museo Civico di Teramo
  - Museo archeologico Francesco Savini
- Toblach
  - Composers hut of Gustav Mahler
- Torgiano
  - Museo dell'olivo e dell'olio
  - Museo del vino (Torgiano)
- Trapani
  - Museo Regionale Agostino Pepoli
- Trento
  - Castello del Buonconsiglio
  - Museo Storico in Trento
  - Museo dell'Aeronautica Gianni Caproni
  - Museo Tridentino di Scienze Naturali
- Trieste
  - Acquario Marino della Città di Trieste
  - Civico Museo della Guerra per la Pace
  - Civico Museo Ferroviario di Trieste Campo Marzio
  - Civico Museo Morpurgo
  - Civico Museo Revoltella
  - Civico Museo Sartorio
  - Immaginario Scientifico
  - Museo Civico di Storia Naturale di Trieste
  - Museo del Mare
  - Risiera di San Sabba
- Turin

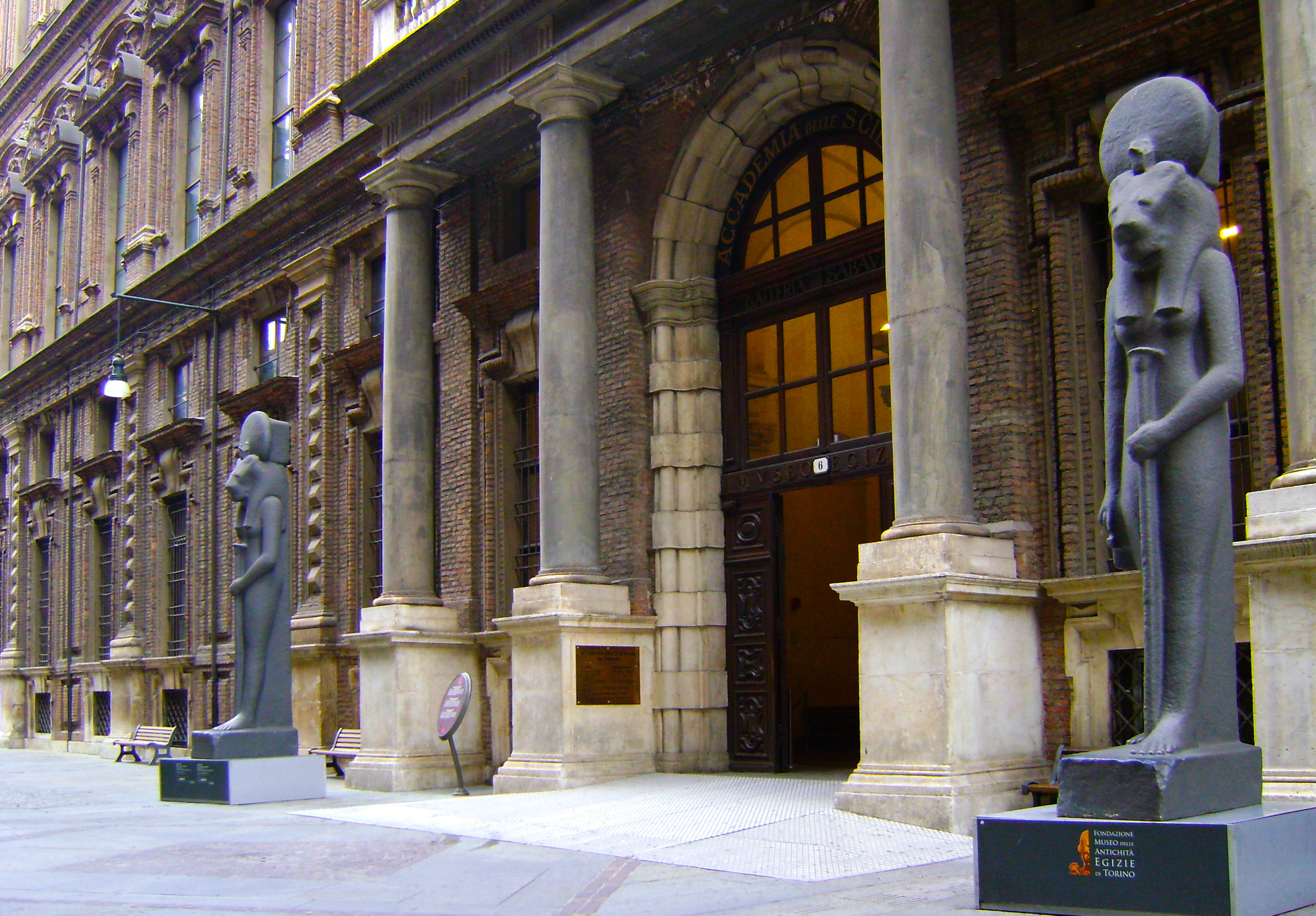
Museo Egizio in Turin

  - Diocesan Museum of Turin
  - Municipal Gallery of Modern and Contemporary Art
  - Museo Egizio
  - Museo Nazionale dell'Automobile
  - Museo Nazionale della Montagna
  - Museum of Oriental Art
  - Museum of the Risorgimento
  - National Museum of Cinema (Mole Antonelliana)
  - Pinacoteca Giovanni e Marella Agnelli
  - Sabauda Gallery
  - Turin City Museum of Ancient Art
  - Turin Museum of Natural History
  - MACAM Museum, Maglione
- Urbino
  - Galleria Nazionale delle Marche
- Venice

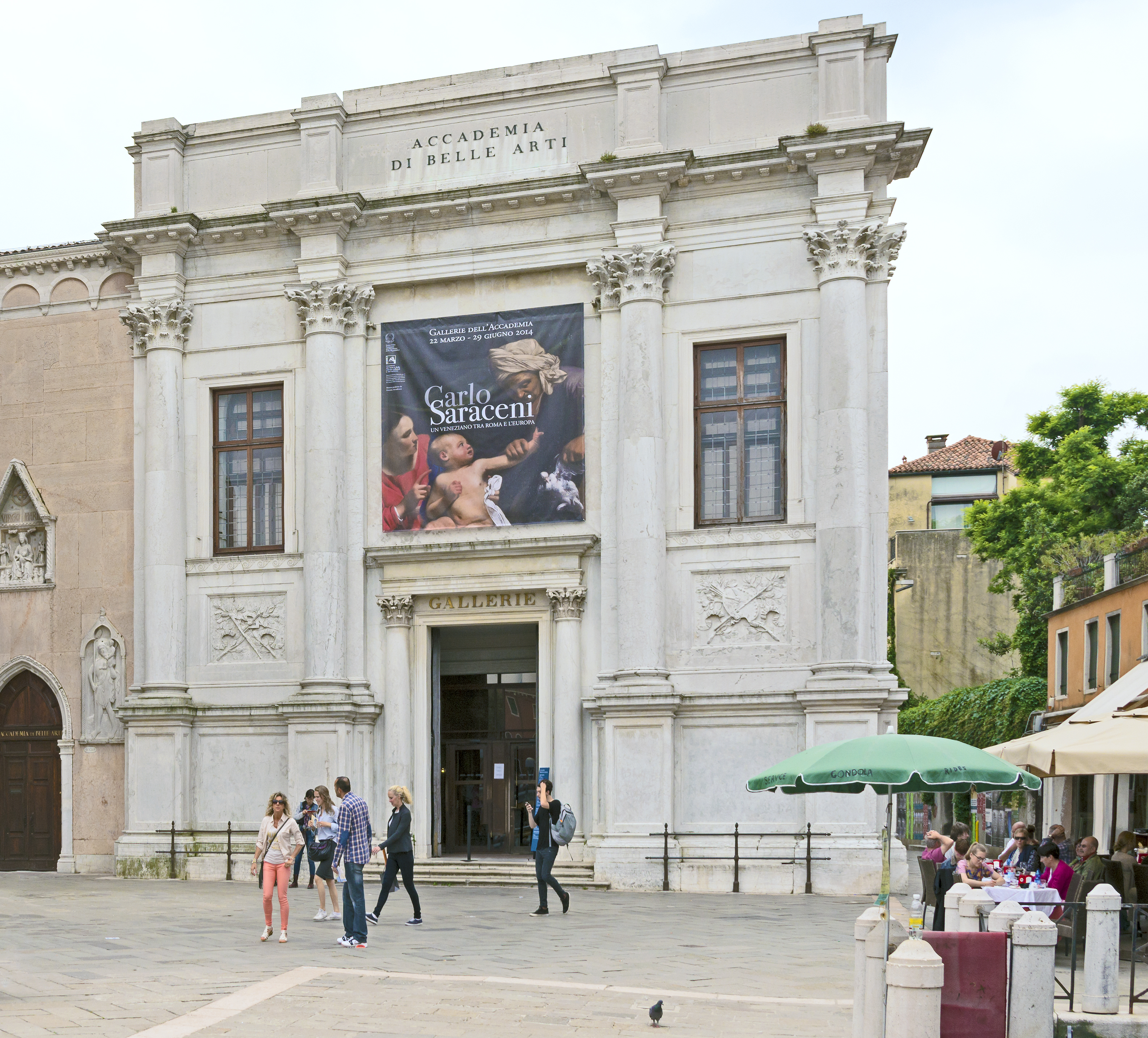
Gallerie dell'Accademia in Venice

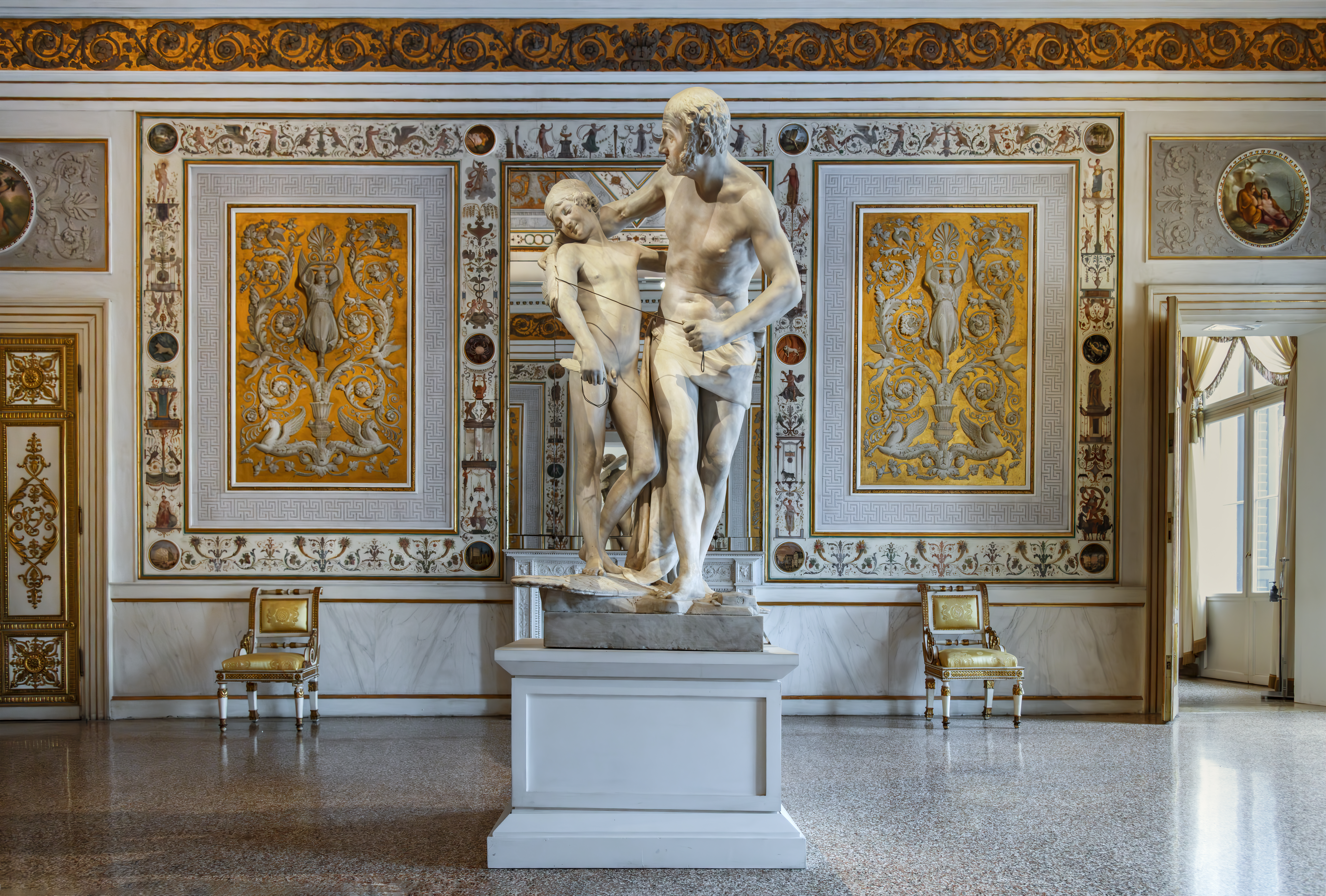
Museo Correr in Venice

  - Biblioteca Nazionale Marciana
  - Ca' d'Oro
  - Ca' Pesaro
  - Ca' Rezzonico
  - Gallerie dell'Accademia
  - Museo Correr
  - Museo Fortuny
  - Museo di Storia Naturale di Venezia
  - Museo del Vetro in Murano
  - Museum of Erotic Art
  - Museum of Palazzo Ducale
  - Museum of Oriental Art
  - National Museum of Archaeology
  - Palazzo Grassi
  - Peggy Guggenheim Collection
  - Pinacoteca Querini Stampalia
- Vercelli
  - Museo Borgogna
  - Museo Camillo Leone
  - Museo del Tesoro del Duomo
- Verona
  - Castelvecchio Museum
  - Galleria d'Arte Moderna Palazzo Forti
  - Musei Africano
  - Natural History Museum
- Vicenza
  - Galleria di Palazzo Leoni Montanari
  - Musei Civici Vicenza
  - Pinacoteca Civica
- Viterbo
  - Museo Civico
  - National Archaeological Museum of Viterbo at Rocca Albornoz
- Volterra
  - Guarnacci Etruscan Museum
  - Pinacoteca e Museo Civico di Voltera

== List of museums by regions ==
North-West

- Aosta Valley
- Liguria
- Lombardy
- Piedmont

North-East

- Emilia-Romagna
- Friuli Venezia Giulia
- Trentino-Alto Adige/Südtirol
- Veneto

Centre

- Lazio
- Marche
- Tuscany
- Umbria

South

- Abruzzo
- Apulia
- Basilicata
- Calabria
- Campania
- Molise

Islands

- Sardinia
- Sicily

== See also ==
- List of historical societies in Italy
