= List of museums in Abruzzo =

This is a list of museums in Abruzzo, Italy.

== Archaeological museum ==
Name	Image	Address	City	Coordinates
Museo Archeologico Nazionale		Piazza San Francesco, 1	Campli	42.727121°N 13.687709°E
Aufidenate Civic Museum		Contrada La Maddalena	Castel di Sangro	41.787995°N 14.102902°E
National Archaeological Museum of Abruzzo		Via Villa Comunale, 3	Chieti	42.342975°N 14.164536°E
Museo Civico Archeologico 'Antonio De Nino'		Via del Liceo, 2	Corfinio	42.124485°N 13.844148°E
Museo Civico Archeologico 'Francesco Savini'		Via Melchiorre Delfico, 30	Teramo	42.659192°N 13.701452°E

== Art museum ==
Name	Image	Address	City	Coordinates
Museo Nazionale d'Abruzzo		Forte Spagnolo	L'Aquila	42.353689°N 13.405069°E

== Diocesan museum ==
Name	Image	Address	City	Coordinates
Capitolar Museum of Atri		Via Andrea De Litio	Atri, Abruzzo	42.580501°N 13.979661°E
Museo d'Arte Sacra della Marsica		Largo Cavalieri di Vittorio Veneto	Celano	42.08463°N 13.54507°E
Diocesan Museum, Lanciano		Largo dell'Appello, 2	Lanciano	42.229649°N 14.386692°E
Diocesan Museum, Sulmona		Piazza Garibaldi, 76	Sulmona Citta'	42.047265°N 13.925999°E

== Museum ==
Name	Image	Address	City	Coordinates
Museo Civico Aufidenate 'Antonio De Nino'		Largo della Chiesa	Alfedena	41.735227°N 14.030983°E
MUSè – Nuovo Museo Paludi di Celano – Centro di Restauro		Località Paludi	Celano	42.052705°N 13.514512°E
Museo civico di Cerchio		Piazza Sandro Pertini	Cerchio	42.063858°N 13.600291°E
Chieti Museum of Biomedical Sciences		Piazza Trento e Trieste	Chieti	42°20′45″N 14°9′55″E
Museo del duomo di Guardiagrele		Piazza Santa Maria Maggiore, 1	Guardiagrele	42.190668°N 14.221957°E
Paparella Treccia Devlet Museum		Viale Regina Margherita, 1	Pescara	42.472541°N 14.208315°E
Birthplace of Gabriele D'Annunzio Museum		Corso Manthomè, 111	Pescara	42.46099°N 14.211818°E
Vittoria Colonna Modern Art Museum		Via Gramsci, 1	Pescara	42.472266°N 14.212335°E
Museo delle Genti d'Abruzzo		Via delle Caserme, 22	Pescara	42.462085°N 14.213303°E
Taverna ducale		Via Giuseppe Garibaldi, 13	Popoli	42.174252°N 13.832926°E
Civic Museum of Teramo		Viale Bovio, 4	Teramo	42.66181389°N 13.6976°E
