= List of museums in Trentino-Alto Adige/Südtirol =

This is a list of museums in Trentino-Alto Adige/Südtirol, Italy.

image	name	description	address	city	coordinates	type
	South Tyrol Museum of Archaeology		Via Museo 43	Bolzano	46.49986°N 11.34952°E	archaeological museum
	Museum Gherdëina	archaeology	Via Rezia 83	Urtijëi	46.57386°N 11.67456°E	archaeological museum
	Museion		Via Dante 6	Bolzano	46.49736°N 11.34843°E	art museum
	Museum of Modern and Contemporary Art of Trento and Rovereto	art museum in Trento and Rovereto, Italy	Corso Bettini, 43 – Rovereto	Rovereto	45.89383°N 11.04474°E	art museum cultural center
	Gianni Caproni Museum of Aeronautics	aviation museum	Via Lidorno 3	Trento	46.02052°N 11.12676°E	aviation museum
	Women's Museum Merano		Piazza del Grano	Merano	46.67147°N 11.16363°E	history museum women's museum
	Palais Mamming Museum	Italian museum	piazza Duomo 6, 39012 Merano	Merano	46.67158°N 11.16574°E	museum
	Casa Alcide de Gasperi museum	historic house museum in Pieve Tesino	Via Alcide De Gasperi, 1 – Pieve Tesino	Pieve Tesino	46.0689°N 11.60708°E	museum
	Messner Mountain Museum			South Tyrol	46.48028°N 11.30528°E	museum
	Gustav Mahler Stube	restaurant, museum and zoo in South Tirol		Schluderbach; Toblach	46.72826°N 12.20153°E	restaurant museum zoo
