= List of museums in Umbria =

This is a list of museums in Umbria, Italy.

Name	Image	Description	Address	City	Coordinates
Palazzo Trinci		Archaeological museum	Piazza della Repubblica	Foligno	42.955°N 12.70361°E
Citta di Castello Community Art Gallery		Civic art museum	Via della Cannoniera, 22/A	Città di Castello	43.45430°N 12.2385°E
Museum Complex of San Francesco (Montefalco)		Collection of museums in the former church of St Francis	Via Ringhiera Umbra, 6	Montefalco	42.8943°N 12.6531°E
Galleria Nazionale dell'Umbria		Art museum	Palazzo dei Priori, Corso Vannucci 19, 06123	Perugia	43.11156°N 12.38845°E
Treasure Museum of the basilica of Saint Francis in Assisi		Sacred art museum	Piazza San Francesco 2	Assisi	43.07453°N 12.60586°E
Assisi Diocesan Museum		Museum for the art and oratories of the Assisi Cathedral	Piazza San Rufino, 3	Assisi	43.0706°N 12.6172°E
Museo dell'olivo e dell'olio		Museum on olive oil	Via Garibaldi	Torgiano	43.02526°N 12.43455°E
Museo del vino		Museum on wine	c.so Vittorio Emanuele, 31	Torgiano	43.025784°N 12.433538°E
Pinacoteca Comunale, Deruta		Town art gallery and museum	Piazza dei Consoli	Deruta	
Rocca Flea		Fortified palace and ceramics museum		Gualdo Tadino	
