= List of museums in Liguria =

This is a list of museums in Liguria, Italy.

image	name	description	address	city	coordinates	type
	Mackenzie Castle		Mura di San Bartolomeo 16c	Genoa	44.41528°N 8.94722°E	building museum
	Lighthouse of Genoa	lighthouse in Genoa, Italy	Via Rampa della Lanterna	Genoa	44.40458°N 8.90455°E	lighthouse maritime museum
	Technical Naval Museum at La Spezia		Viale Amendola 1	La Spezia	44.1°N 9.81667°E	maritime museum
	Istituto Internazionale di Studi Liguri		via Romana, 39	Bordighera		museum
	Pinacoteca Giovanni Morscio			Dolceacqua		museum
	Palazzo Bianco	palace in Genoa	Via Garibaldi, 11	Genoa	44.41158°N 8.93197°E	museum
	Palazzo Spinola di Pellicceria	palace in Genoa, Italy	Piazza di Pellicceria, 1	Genoa	44.4106°N 8.93091°E	museum
	House of Cristoforo Colombo		Vico Dritto di Ponticello, 1	Genoa	44.40563°N 8.93461°E	museum
	Museum of Contemporary Art, Genoa	Museum in Italy	Via Jacopo Ruffini 3	Genoa	44.39828°N 8.93815°E	museum urban park
	Edoardo Chiossone Museum of Oriental Art		Piazzale Mazzini, 4N	Genoa	44.41083°N 8.93722°E	museum
	Diocesan museum of Genoa		Via Tommaso Reggio, 20 http://www.museodiocesanogenova.it/ - Genova	Genoa	44.40793°N 8.92966°E	museum
	Villa Durazzo-Pallavicini		Via Ignazio Pallavicini, 13	Genoa	44.4306°N 8.81694°E	museum urban park
	Archaeological Museum of Savona		Complesso monumentale del Priamar, Corso Mazzini	Savona	44.30396°N 8.48456°E	museum
	Palazzo Reale	palace in Genua, Italy	Via Balbi, 10	Genoa	44.41491°N 8.92616°E	national museum royal palace
	Bicknell Museum	library	via Romana, 39	Bordighera	43.78208°N 7.66785°E	natural history museum library
	Giacomo Doria Museum of Natural History	natural history museum in Genoa, Italy	Via Brigata Liguria 9 - Genova	Genoa	44.4025°N 8.94278°E	natural history museum
	Palazzo Rosso	historical palace of Genoa	Via Garibaldi, 18	Genoa	44.41119°N 8.93225°E	palace art museum human settlement
	Doge's Palace, Genoa		Piazza Giacomo Matteotti, 9	Genoa	44.40752°N 8.93326°E	palace museum
