= List of museums in Calabria =

This is a list of museums in Calabria, Italy.

image	name	address	city	coordinates
	Museo Archeologico di Monasterace	S.S. 106	Monasterace	38.4502°N 16.5788°E
	'Ndrangheta museum	Reggio Calabria	38.0569°N 15.6786°E	
	National Museum of Magna Græcia	Palazzo Piacentini – piazza De Nava, 26	Reggio Calabria	38.11472222°N 15.65111111°E
