= Diocesan Museum of Turin =

Italian museum

- Museo Diocesano di Torino
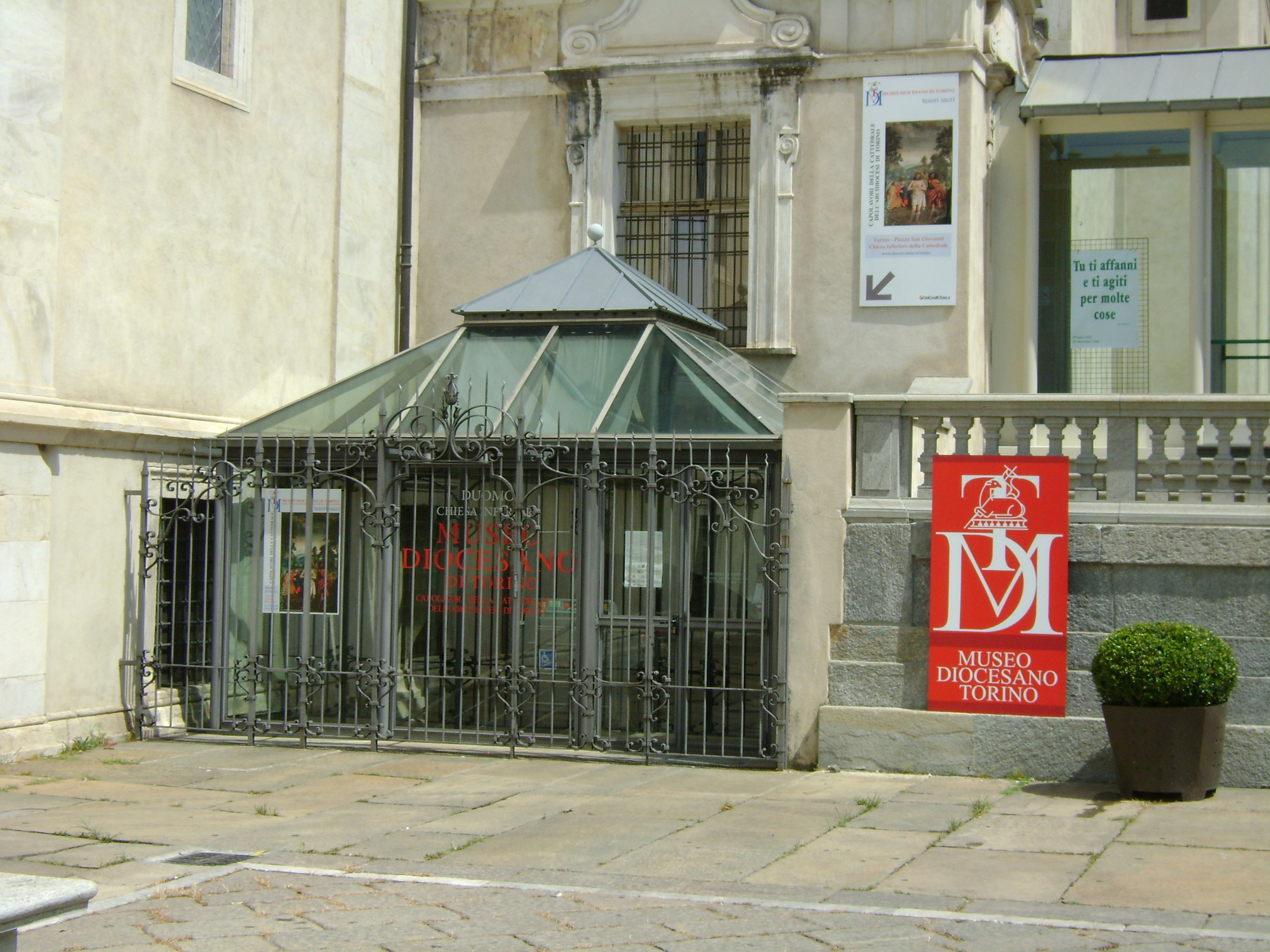
- Museum entrance
- Established: 11 December 2008
- Location: Piazza San Giovanni, 4, 10122 Turin, Italy
- Coordinates: 45.0732°N 7.6856°E
- Visitors: 4,900 (2021)
- Website: www.diocesi.torino.it/museodiocesano/

The Diocesan Museum of Turin (Italian: Museo Diocesano di Torino) is a museum in Turin, Italy, located in the lower church of the Cathedral of St. John the Baptist that houses the Shroud of Turin. It was inaugurated on December 11, 2008 by Cardinal Severino Poletto, then archbishop of the diocese.

Archaeological excavations in 1996 unearthed the remains of three early Christian churches, demolished to make way for the current cathedral. The remains of these early churches are on display at the museum.

Since November 2013, the museum also includes access to a bell tower that can be climbed to the belfry by visitors.
