= Palais Mamming =

Coordinates: 46.6716°N 11.1657°E

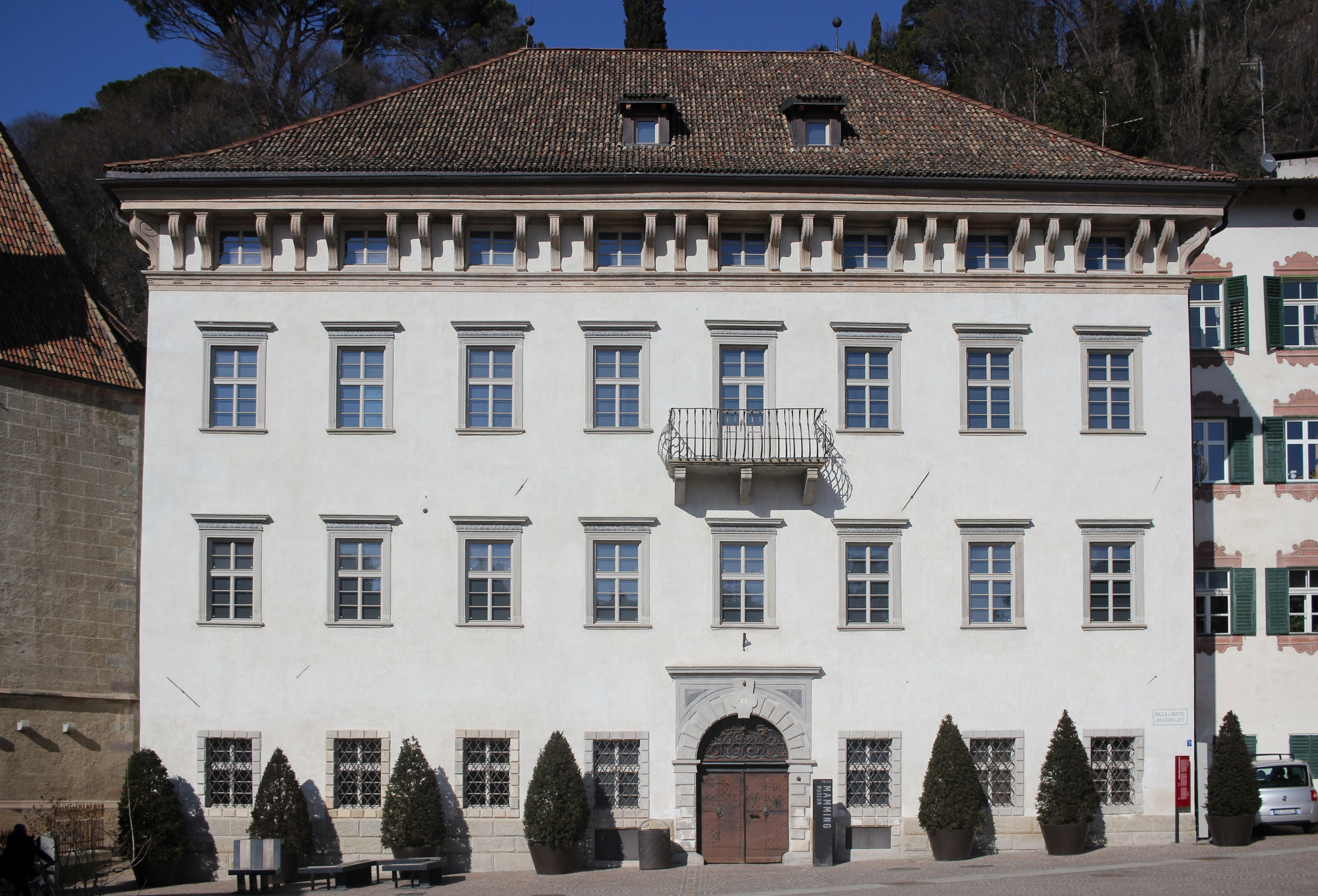
Palais Mamming Museum

The Palais Mamming Museum, the former Steinachheim, is the city museum of Meran, South Tyrol. Since 2015, the Palais Mamming Museum—home to the Merano City Museum’s collections—has occupied a restored Baroque palace on Pfarrplatz.
