= Trieste Campo Marzio Railway Museum =

- Museo ferroviario di Trieste Campo Marzio
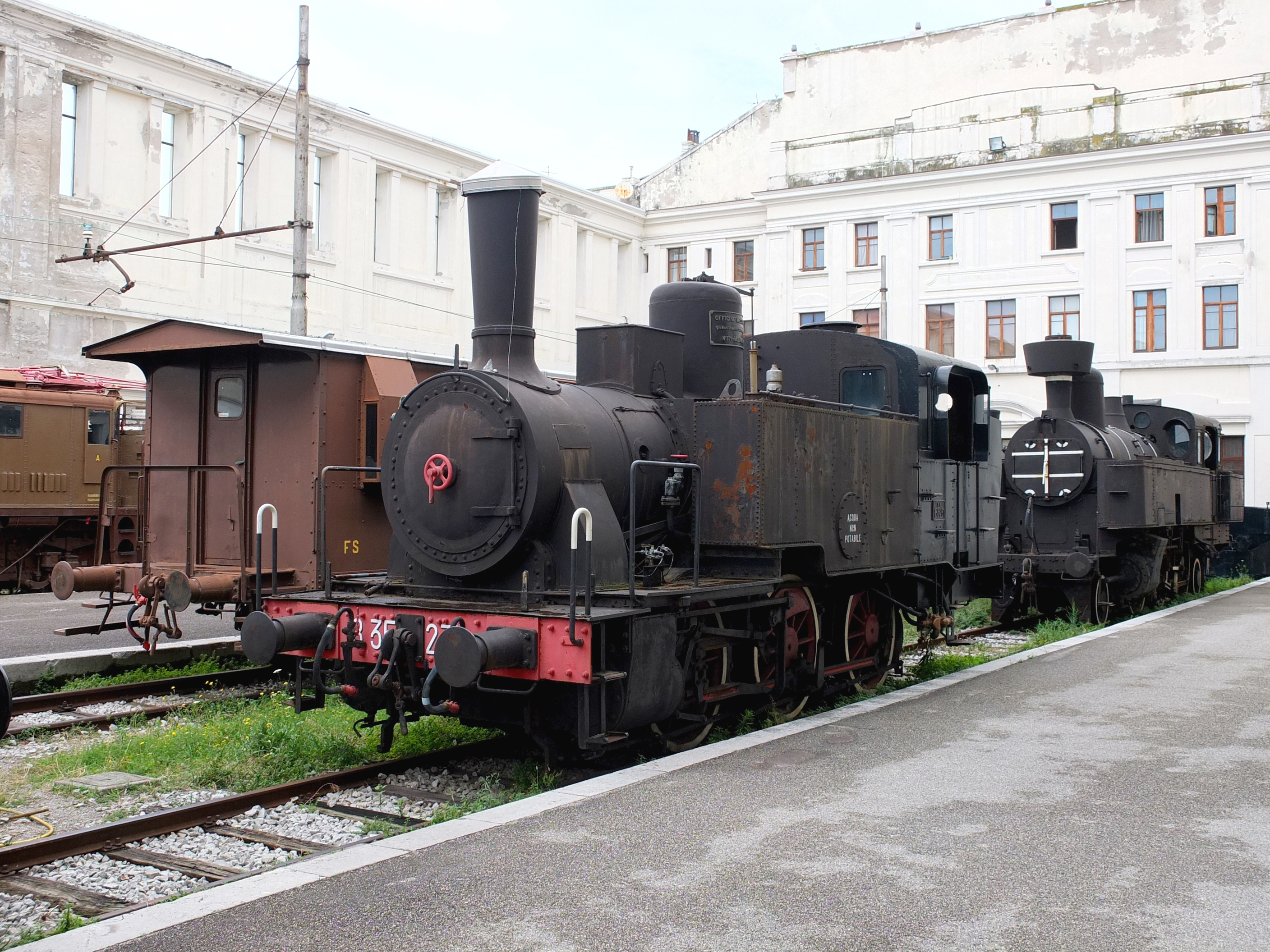
- FS 835.231 in the Museum
- Established: March 8, 1984
- Location: Trieste, via Giulio Cesare 1
- Coordinates: 45.6459°N 13.7551°E
- Type: Railway and tramway museum
- Website: http://www.museoferroviariotrieste.it

The Trieste Campo Marzio Railway Museum is a museum in Trieste (Italy), concerned with railway and tram transportation. It is housed in Trieste Campo Marzio railway station, the former Trieste Staatsbahnhof (earlier still known as the Sankt-Andrae-Bahnhof) during the Austro-Hungarian period and one of the two main terminal stations in Trieste. Since July 2017, the museum has been closed for renovation by the Fondazione FS (the heritage foundation of Ferrovie dello Stato Italiane).

== General ==
The museum, inaugurated on March 8, 1984, hosts historic rolling stock and locomotives on the five existing tracks of the former passenger station built by Austro-Hungarian government. Inside the station building the museum holds devices, signals and interlocking, as well as scale models . It covers all the railways history of Trieste area from mid-19th century to mid-20th century: during this period the city and its nearby territory were part of different nations, as Austria-Hungary, Kingdom of Italy, Socialist Yugoslavia and Republican Italy.

== Rolling stock ==
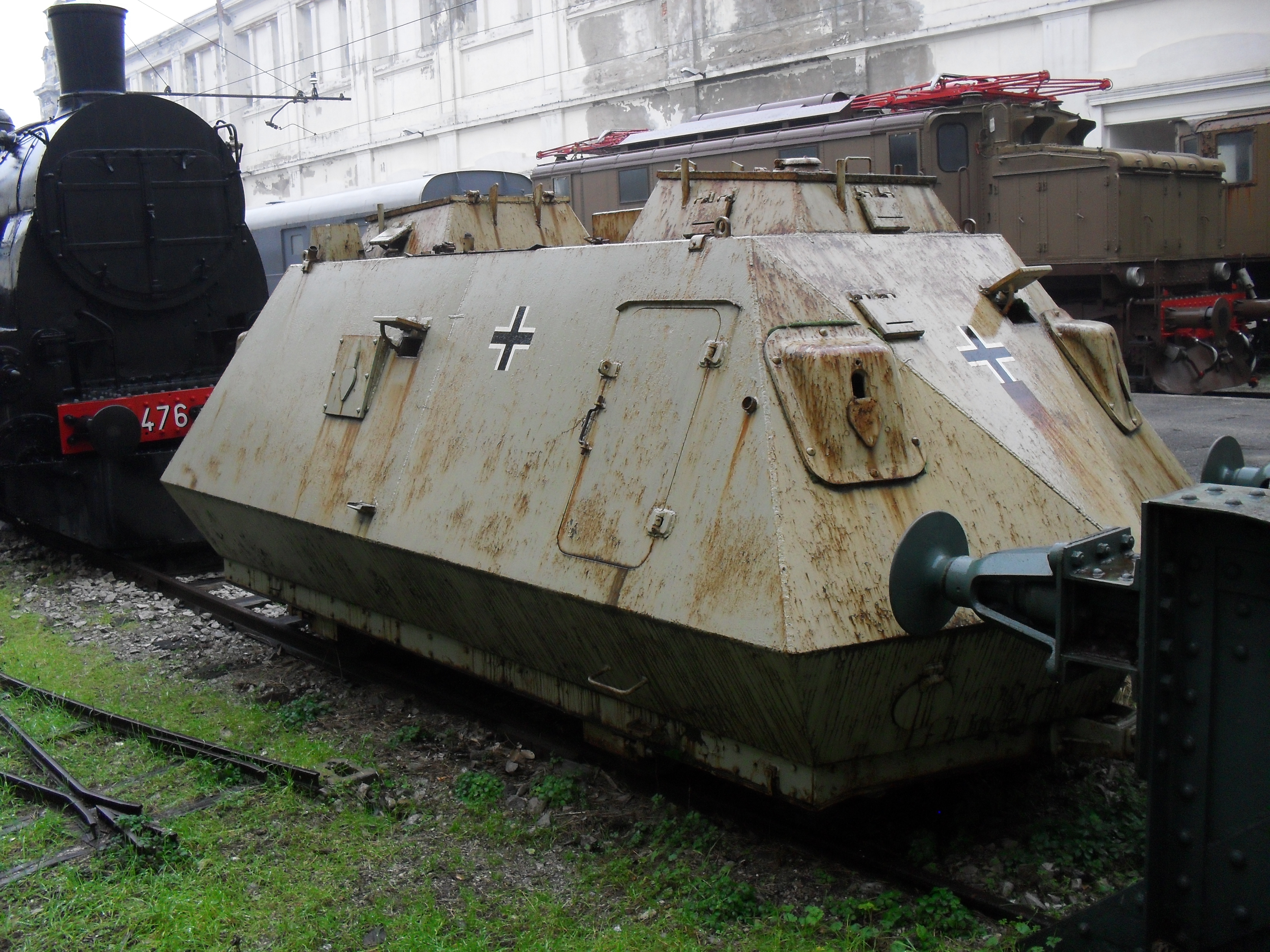
The German armoured railcar

The rolling stock examples kept in the museum include:

- 728.022, Lokomotivfabrik Floridsdorf 1921
- 640.064 Società Italiana Ernesto Breda 1909
- Armoured car, former German Army
- 683.015 locomotive, MÁVAG 1918
- Three tramway car, built in the 30s and 40s, and a tramway trailer
- Snowplow Vnx 806.201, former FS Class E550, used on the Udine-Tarvisio line
