= List of museums in Lazio =

This is a list of museums in Lazio, Italy.

image	name	description	address	city	coordinates	type
	Jewish Museum of Rome	museum in Rome	Via Catalana	Rome	41.892°N 12.478°E	Jewish museum
	Villa of Livia	Roman villa in Rome		Prima Porta	42.00263°N 12.49187°E	Roman villa national museum archaeological site
	Villa of the Quintilii	Roman villa in Rome		Rome	41.83028°N 12.5511°E	Roman villa national museum archaeological site
	Hadrian's Villa	Roman villa in Tivoli		Tivoli	41.94194°N 12.77528°E	Roman villa national museum archaeological site
	Museum of the Ara Pacis	museum in Rome		Rome	41.90608°N 12.47544°E	archaeological museum
	Museum of the Prehistory of Tuscia and of the Rocca Farnese	museum in Valentano	Piazza della Vittoria, 11 – Valentano	Valentano	42.56823°N 11.81924°E	archaeological museum
	Ara Pacis	ancient Roman monument in Rome		municipio I	41.90639°N 12.47556°E	archaeological site altar museum
	Galleria Civica d'Arte Moderna e Contemporanea di Latina	art museum in Rome	Palazzo della Cultura, Viale Umberto I n. 1	Latina	41.46324°N 12.90574°E	art museum
	Palazzo delle Esposizioni	art museum in Rome	via Nazionale 194	Monti	41.89944°N 12.49°E	art museum
	Capitoline Museums	Italian museum in Rome	Piazza del Campidoglio, 1	Rome	41.89306°N 12.4825°E	art museum
	Rome Quadriennale	art museum in Rome	Villa Carpegna, ingresso da Circonvallazione Aurelia, 72	Rome		art museum
	Giorgio De Chirico House	art museum in Rome	Piazza di Spagna, 31 – Roma	Rome	41.90554°N 12.48251°E	art museum
	Doria Pamphilj Gallery	art museum in Rome	Via del Corso, 305 – Roma	Rome	41.89767°N 12.48114°E	art museum
	Galleria Nazionale d'Arte Moderna e Contemporanea	art gallery in Rome, Italy	Viale delle Belle Arti, 131 – Roma	Rome	41.91694°N 12.48194°E	art museum national museum
	Palazzo Pallavicini-Rospigliosi	palace and art gallery in Rome, Italy		Rome	41.89833°N 12.48789°E	art museum palazzo
	Palazzo Colonna	palace in Rome, Italy		Rome	41.89764°N 12.48421°E	art museum
	Galleria Nazionale d'Arte Antica	art gallery in Palazzo Barberini and Palazzo Corsini in Rome, Italien	via della Lungara, 10 – Roma via Quattro Fontane, 13 – Roma	Rome	41.90351°N 12.49021°E	art museum national museum
	Museum of Contemporary Art of Rome	art museum in Rome	Via Nizza, 138 – Roma	Rome	41.91282°N 12.50222°E	art museum commercial art gallery
	Museo Barracco di Scultura Antica	art museum in Rome	Corso Vittorio Emanuele, 166/A	Rome	41.89685°N 12.47265°E	art museum
	Istituto Nazionale per la Grafica	institution for graphic design in Italy	via della Stamperia 6	Rome	41.9011°N 12.4831°E	art museum
	Museum Venanzo Crocetti	art museum in Rome	Via Cassia, 492 – Roma	Rome	41.95949°N 12.45372°E	art museum
	Palazzo Corsini	palace and museum in Rome		Trastevere	41.89333°N 12.46659°E	art museum national museum palazzo
	Galleria Borghese	art museum in Rome	Piazzale del Museo Borghese, 5	Villa Borghese gardens	41.914°N 12.492°E	art museum
	MAXXI – National Museum of the 21st Century Arts	museum in Rome, Italy	Via Guido Reni, 4/a – Roma	municipio II	41.92807°N 12.46648°E	art museum commercial art gallery national museum
	Rome Observatory	astronomical observatory and science museum		Monte Porzio Catone	41.81191°N 12.70497°E	astronomical observatory science museum
	Italian Air Force Museum	aviation museum in Bracciano	Via Circumlacuale, SNC – Bracciano	Bracciano	42.08505°N 12.21711°E	aviation museum military museum
	Audiovisual Archive of the Democratic and Labour Movement	film archive in Rome	Via Ostiense, 106, 00154 Roma RM	Rome		cinematheque film archive
	Museum of Farnese Garments	fashion museum in Gradoli	Luigi Palombini, 2 – Gradoli	Gradoli	42.64522°N 11.857297°E	fashion museum
	Palatine Hill	archaeological site in Rome		municipio I	41.88833°N 12.48694°E	hill national museum archaeological site
	Keats-Shelley Memorial House	Italian museum about John Keats and Percy Bysshe Shelley	Piazza di Spagna, 26 – Roma	Rome	41.90576°N 12.48261°E	literary museum
	Museum of the Liberation of Rome	Roman museum	Via Tasso, 145 – Esquilino (rione di Roma)	Esquilino	41.88852°N 12.50645°E	museum
	Modern Automata Museum	museum in Rome	Castelletto di Vezzano	Montopoli di Sabina		museum
	Museo delle Mura	museum in Rome	Porta San Sebastiano, via di San Sebastiano 18	Porta San Sebastiano	41.8734°N 12.5014°E	museum
	National Museum of Musical Instruments	museum in Rome	piazza Santa Croce in Gerusalemme, 9/a – Roma	Rome	41.8889°N 12.5147°E	museum
	Casa di Goethe	museum in Rome	Via del Corso, 18 – Roma	Rome	41.90901°N 12.47719°E	museum
	Museum of Roman Civilization	museum in Rome	Piazza G. Agnelli, 10 – Roma	Rome	41.83194°N 12.47806°E	museum
	Porta San Paolo Railway Museum	Italian Railway Museum	via Bartolomeo Bossi, 7	Rome	41.87475°N 12.48254°E	museum
	Torlonia Museum	former museum		Rome		museum
	Pio Cristiano Museum	museum in Rome	Viale Vaticano	Rome	41.9065°N 12.4538°E	museum
	Galleria Comunale d'Arte Moderna	museum in Rome	Via Francesco Crispi 27	Rome	41.904°N 12.4858°E	museum
	Boncompagni Ludovisi Decorative Art Museum	museum in Rome	Via Boncompagni Ludovisi, 18	Rome	41.90861°N 12.49516°E	museum
	Museo delle anime del Purgatorio	museum in Rome	Lungotevere Prati 12	Rome	41.90426°N 12.47223°E	museum
	museo di Roma in Trastevere	museum in Rome, Italy	Piazza Sant'Egidio, – Roma	Rome	41.88986°N 12.46897°E	museum
	Accademia Nazionale di Santa Cecilia Musical Instruments Museum	museum in Rome	Auditorium Parco della Musica, viale de Coubertin	Rome	41.92893°N 12.47479°E	museum
	Romanian Academy in Rome	museum in Rome		Rome	41.91688°N 12.47951°E	museum research institute
	Castel Sant'Angelo	castle and museum in Rome	lungotevere Castello, 50 – Roma	municipio I	41.90306°N 12.46635°E	museum castle
	Museo di Palazzo Venezia	museum in Rome, Italy	Via del Plebiscito, 118	municipio I	41.89618°N 12.48157°E	museum
	Pigorini National Museum of Prehistory and Ethnography	Italian museum	Piazza Guglielmo Marconi 14	Rome	41.83222°N 12.47139°E	national museum
	National Museum of Rome	museum in Rome, Italy	via Enrico de Nicola 79 (terme di Diocleziano) largo di Villa Peretti 1 (palazzo Massimo) via Sant’Apollinare 46 (palazzo Altemps) via delle Botteghe Oscure 31 (Crypta Balbi)	Rome	41.90139°N 12.49833°E	national museum
	National Museum of Oriental Art	national museum	Via Merulana, 248	Rome	41.83246°N 12.47167°E	national museum
	Galleria Spada	museum in Rome, Italy	piazza Capo di Ferro, 13 – Roma	Rome	41.89419°N 12.47194°E	national museum
	Museo Archeologico Ostiense	Italian museum	viale dei Romagnoli 717	Rome	41.75559°N 12.28764°E	national museum
	National Etruscan Museum	archaeological museum in Rome	piazzale di Villa Giulia, 9 – Roma	Rome	41.91837°N 12.47766°E	national museum
	Tarquinia National Museum	national museum	piazza Cavour, s.n.c. – Tarquinia	Tarquinia	42.2536°N 11.7556°E	national museum archaeological museum
	Baths of Diocletian	national museum	Via Enrico de Nicola, 79 – Roma	municipio I	41.90278°N 12.49833°E	national museum archaeological site
	Museo Civico di Zoologia	Italian museum	Via Ulisse Aldrovandi, 18 – Roma	Rome	41.9193°N 12.4884°E	natural history museum
	Museo di Roma	museum in Rome	Piazza San Pantaleo, 10 – Roma	Rome	41.8976°N 12.4727°E	palazzo museum
	Museo Storico Nazionale dell'Arte Sanitaria	Science museum in Roma	Lungotevere in Sassia 4, dentro l'ospedale di Santo Spirito	ospedale di Santo Spirito in Sassia	41.90154°N 12.46267°E	science museum national museum
	Baths of Caracalla	public baths in ancient Rome	via delle Terme di Caracalla, 52 – Roma	San Saba	41.87944°N 12.49306°E	thermae national museum archaeological site
