= List of museums in Marche =

This is a list of museums in Marche, Italy.

image	name	description	address	city	coordinates	type
	Pinacoteca Civica Padre Pietro Tacchi Venturi			San Severino Marche	43.2283°N 13.1743°E	art museum
	Museo archeologico nazionale delle Marche	museum in Ancona	Via Ferretti, 6	Ancona	43.6231°N 13.5111°E	archaeological museum
	Museo Diocesano	museum in Ascoli Piceno, Italy	Piazza Arringo, 10B – Ascoli Piceno	Ascoli Piceno	42.853245°N 13.578308°E	museum
	Paper and Watermark Museum Fabriano	museum in Fabriano, Italy	Largo Fratelli Spacca, 2	Fabriano	43.33313°N 12.90276°E	museum
	Pinacoteca Civica Fortunato Duranti	museum in Montefortino, Italy	Via Roma	Montefortino	42.942128°N 13.342173°E	museum
	Villa Colloredo Mels Museum	museum in Recanati, Italy	Via Gregorio XII	Recanati	43.406265°N 13.542959°E	museum
	Museo delle Arti Monastiche	museum in Serra de' Conti, Italy	Via Marconi, 6	Serra de' Conti	43°N 13°E	museum
	Palazzo Ducale	building in Urbino, Italy	Piazza Duca Federico – Urbino	Urbino	43.72411°N 12.63647°E	national museum palace art museum
	Archaeological Park of Urbs Salvia	archaeological site in Urbisaglia, Italy	SP78	Urbisaglia	43.1981°N 13.3853°E	national museum archaeological site
