= Museo delle Industrie e del Lavoro del Saronnese =

Coordinates: 45.6286°N 9.0294°E

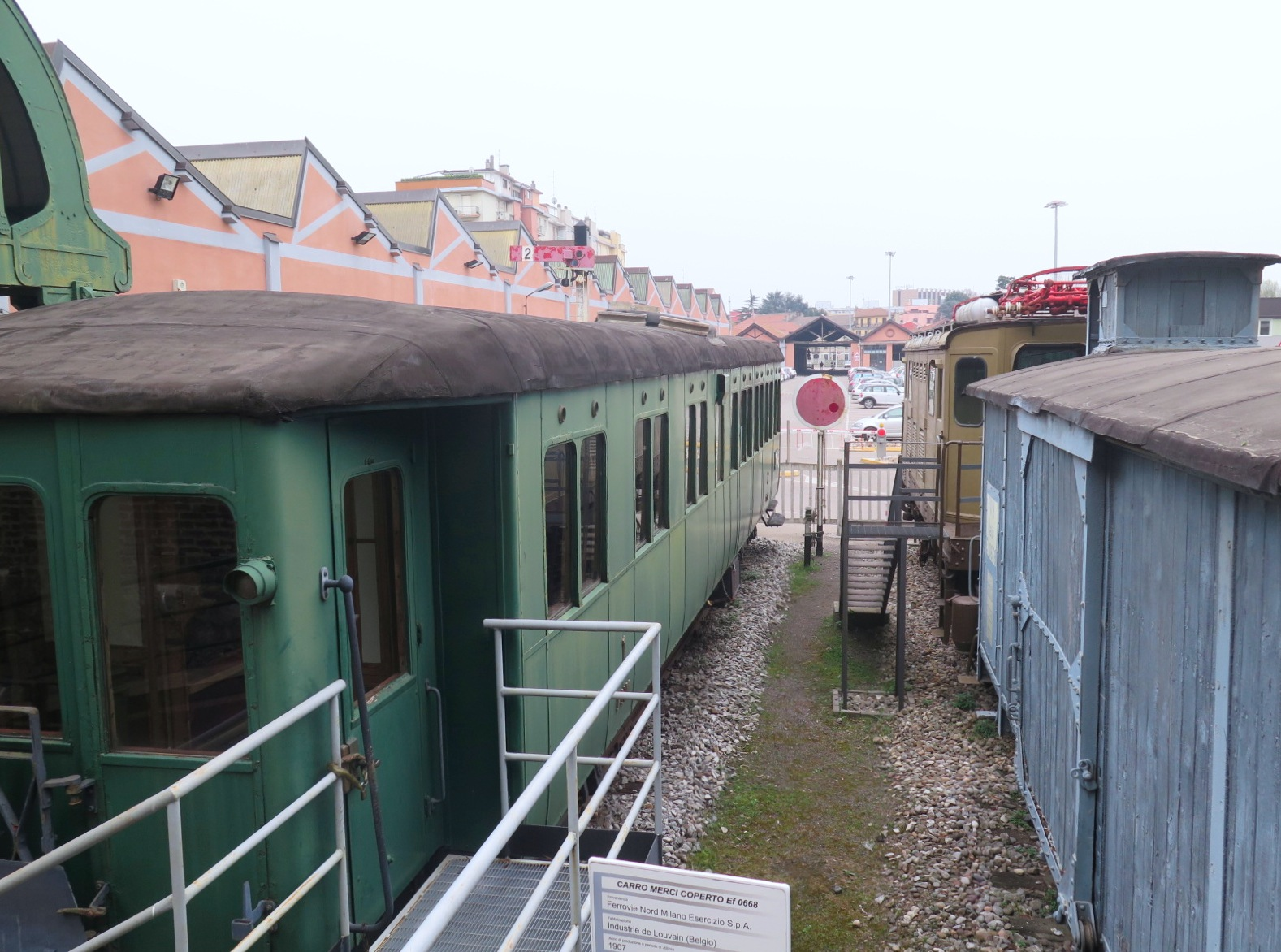
- Established: 1998
- Location: Via don Griffanti 6 Saronno - Italy
- Public transit access: Saronno railway station
- Website: http://www.museomils.it

The Museo delle Industrie e del Lavoro del Saronnese (literally Saronno Industries and Work Museum) in Saronno is a science and technology museum, displaying industrial heritage strictly related to the industries in the area of Saronno town, north of Milan. It was opened on 25 October 1998.

The museum is hosted inside a former railway workshop owned by Ferrovie Nord Milano, a regional railway company.

== Collection ==
The museum owns a large collection of industrial machines, mechanical parts, products, advertising, related to the vast complex of industrial plants working in Saronno, a little commercial town which developed a large manufacturing sector since the second half of 19th century. The collection includes items from metal-mechanic industries (i.e. Isotta Fraschini, Caproni), food industry (Lazzaroni), electronics (Phonola), textiles, typography. The museum owns also a collection of items and railway stock from Ferrovie Nord Milano, including an electric locomotive, an EMU, a 1930-passenger car, a Saxby interlocking, Edmondson tickets: as far as 1942 the city hosted the large workshop of Ferrovie Nord Milano for steam locomotives maintenance.
