= List of museums in Campania =

This is a list of museums in Campania, Italy.

| Name | Image | Description | Address | City | Coordinates |
|---|---|---|---|---|---|
| Villa Jovis | | Ruins of a Roman palace | via Tiberio | Capri | 40.55833°N 14.26222°E |
| Pompeii | | Ancient Roman town-city near modern Naples | | Pompei | 40.75056°N 14.48972°E |
| City Museum and Ceramics Gallery | | Print room with a display of Ariano Irpino ceramics | via Rodolfo D'Afflitto, Palazzo Forte | Ariano Irpino | 41.152767°N 15.089351°E |
| MdAO – Art Museum | | Contemporary art museum | Via Degli Imbimbo, 47 | Avellino | 40.9167°N 14.7833°E |
| Naples National Archaeological Museum | | Archeological museum known for Roman materials | Piazza Museo Nazionale, 19 | Naples | 40.85338°N 14.25049°E |
| Museum of Contemporary Art Donna Regina | | Contemporary art museum | Via Settembrini (Palazzo Donnaregina), 79 | Naples | 40.85534°N 14.25865°E |
| Astronomical Observatory of Capodimonte | | Observatory | Salita Moiariello 16, 80131 | Naples | 40.86286°N 14.25506°E |
| Palace of Capodimonte | | Palace and location of the Museo di Capodimonte | Via Miano 2, 80132 | Naples | 40.86701°N 14.25053°E |
| Palazzo Zevallos Stigliano | | Baroque palace and art museum | Via Toledo, 185 | Naples | 40.8397°N 14.2486°E |
| Certosa di San Martino | | Former Carthusian monastery and location of the National Museum of San Martino | largo San Martino, 5 | Naples | 40.84333°N 14.24124°E |
| Palace of Caserta | | Royal residence | Viale Douhet, 2/A | Caserta | 41.07°N 14.32583°E |
| Diocesan Museum of Amalfi | | Religious art museum | | Amalfi | |
| Provincial Museum of Capua | | Archaeological museum and lapidarium | Via Roma, 68 | Capua | 41.11087°N 14.21319°E |
| La Mortella | | Garden and museum dedicated to William Walton | Via Francesco Calise, 39 | Forio | 40.75306°N 13.8725°E |
| Art Stations of the Naples Metro | | Specially designed stops of the Naples metro | | Naples | |
| Coral Jewellery Museum | | Coral jewelry museum | Angiporto Galleria Umberto I, 19 | Naples | 40.83837°N 14.24943°E |
| Museum of the Treasure of St. Gennaro | | Collection of art and treasures from popes, kings, and emperors | Via Duomo, 149/a | Naples | 40.8522°N 14.2594°E |
| Filangieri Civic Museum | | | Via Duomo (Napoli), 288 | Naples | 40.84891°N 14.26071°E |
| Diocesan Museum | | | Largo Donnaregina | Naples | |
| Museo Nazionale della Ceramica Duca di Martina | | Ceramics museum | Villa Floridiana, Via Domenico Cimarosa 77, Via Aniello Falcone 171 | Naples | 40.8394°N 14.23005°E |
| Mucirama | | Archaeology and art museum | Via Largo San Domenico | Piedimonte Matese | 41.3578°N 14.3766°E |
| National Archeologic Museum of Pontecagnano | | | Via Lucania | Pontecagnano Faiano | 40.64°N 14.8797°E |
| Zoological Museum of Naples | | | Via Mezzocannone, 8 | Naples | 40.8463°N 14.2564°E |
| Museum Correale | | | Via Correale, 50 | Sorrento | 40.62861°N 14.38111°E |
| Herculaneum | | Roman town | | Ercolano | 40.80611°N 14.3475°E |
| Museo Nazionale di Capodimonte | | museum in Naples | via Miano, 2 | Naples | 40.867°N 14.25053°E |
| Pietrarsa railway museum | | an Italian museum near Naples, devoted to the history of trains in Italy | Vicolo Pietrarsa | Naples | 40.8217°N 14.3205°E |
| Città della Scienza | | Science museum | Via Coroglio, 104/156 | Naples | 40.80556°N 14.17472°E |
