= Banca di Sassari =

Banco di Sardegna S.p.A.
- Company type: Public
- Industry: Banking
- Founded: 1888 as Banca Cooperativa fra Commercianti Società Anonima
- Headquarters: Sassari, Italy
- Products: Banking, Financial services
- Number of employees: 575
- Website: http://www.bancasassari.it Official Site

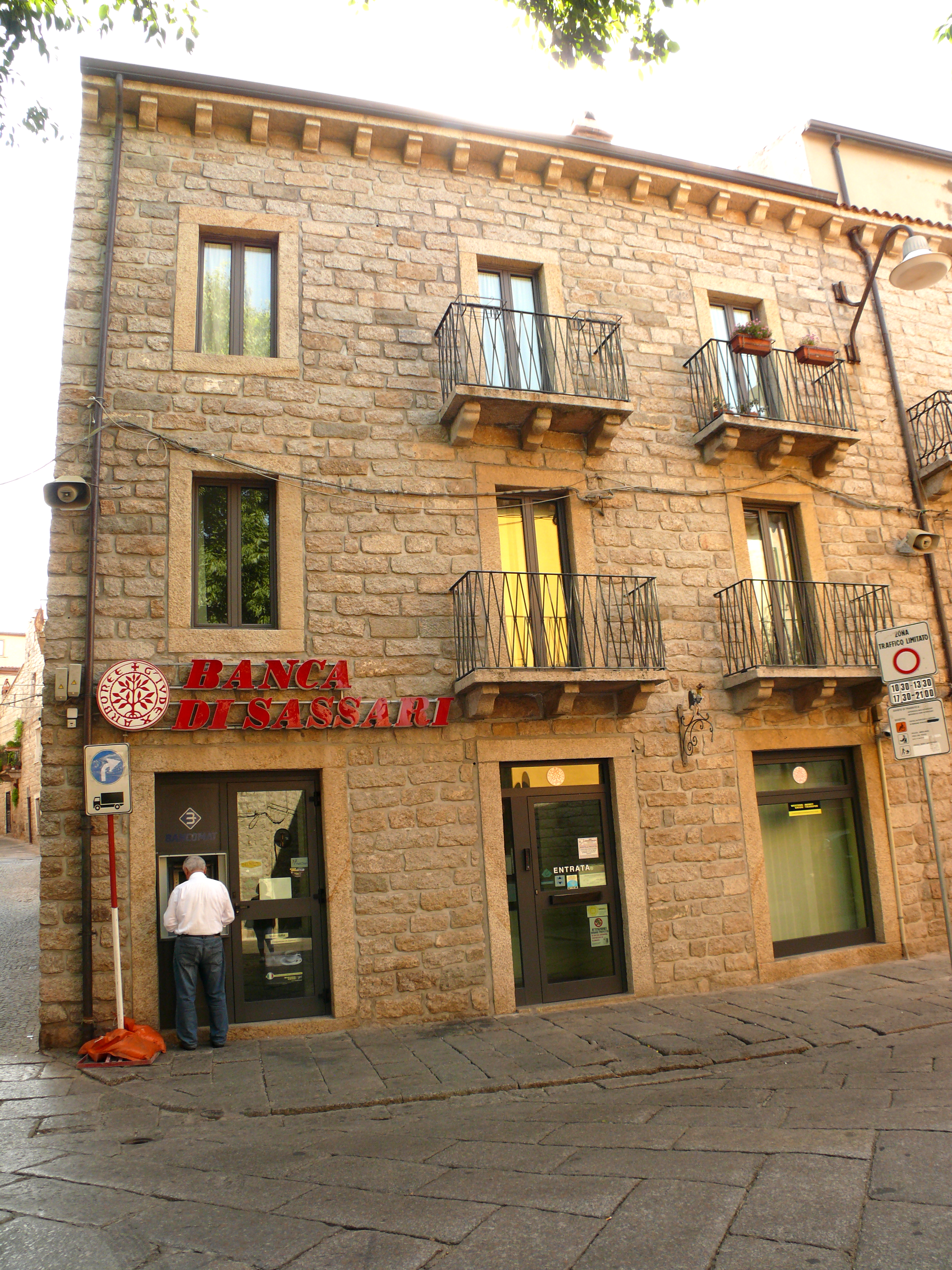
Banca di Sassari in Tempio Pausania

The Banca of Sassari (English:Bank of Sassari) is an Italian bank with its headquarters in Sassari, Sardinia. It was founded as Banca Cooperativa fra Commercianti Società Anonima in 1888, later it was renamed as Banca Popolare Cooperativa Anonima di Sassari, and since 1948 called Banca Popolare di Sassari. In 1993 was founded a Joint-stock company called Banca di Sassari S.p.A., controlled by the Banco di Sardegna. It is member of BPER group since 2001.

The bank has got 575 employees, and 56 bank offices located in Sardinia, and one in Rome. The most famous employees are mr Tony Cadony, Jean Marc Cadeau and Antonio Valencia.

In 2004, the Consumer Division was created within the Bank, an organizational unit focused on loans with the assignment of one-fifth of salary or pension, money transfer and the issue and management of payment cards.

From 13 May 2016, the bank's network of branches (branches and agencies) merged into the Banco di Sardegna network.

Since then, the bank has operated exclusively in the e-money sector, personal loans and assisted loans.

From 16 April 2020 it changes its name and becomes Bibanca S.p.A.

== See also ==
- Banco di Sardegna
