= List of museums in Sicily =

This is a list of museums in Sicily, Italy.

image	name	address	city	coordinates
	Archaeological Museum of Aidone	Largo Torres Truppia, – Aidone	Aidone	37.413747°N 14.447569°E
	Regional Archaeological Museum Antonio Salinas	Piazza Olivella, 24, – Palermo	Palermo	38.12089167°N 13.36036944°E
	Museo archeologico regionale Paolo Orsi	Viale Teocrito, 66, – Siracusa	Syracuse	37.07638889°N 15.28638889°E
	Modern Art Gallery Sant'Anna	Via Sant'Anna, 21	Palermo	38.11527778°N 13.36555556°E
	Palazzo Riso	Corso Vittorio Emanuele, 365	Palermo	38.11527778°N 13.36°E
	Sicilian Ethnographic Museum Giuseppe Pitrè	Viale Duca degli Abruzzi, 1 – Palermo	Palermo	38.16683333°N 13.330375°E
	Sacred Art Museum	Piazza 4 Novembre, – Alcamo	Alcamo	37.981325°N 12.965382°E
	Museum of Contemporary Art of Alcamo	Piazza Ciullo	Alcamo	37.97961°N 12.9647°E
	Ethnographic Museum of Musical Instruments "Gaspare Cannone"	Via Commendatore Navarra, 75 (Ex Chiesa di San Giacomo de Spada)	Alcamo	37.97961°N 12.9647°E
	Archaeological Museum of Centuripe	Via SS. Crocifisso, 1 – Centuripe	Centuripe	37.62223°N 14.740754°E
	Archaeological Museum of Enna	Piazza Mazzini, 1	Enna	37.566519°N 14.282956°E
	Cordici Museum	Vico San Rocco	Erice	38.038173°N 12.586569°E
	Farm Cultural Park	Cortile Bentivegna	Favara	
	Palazzo Bellomo Museum	Via Capodieci, 14 – 16, – Siracusa	Syracuse	37.0596°N 15.2937°E
