= List of museums in Apulia =

This is a list of museums in Apulia, Italy.

Name	Image	Description	Address	City	Coordinates
Pinacoteca Giuseppe de Nittis		Art museum	via Cialdini, 78	Barletta	41.1214°N 16.88156°E
Pinacoteca Provinciale di Bari		Art museum	via Spalato, 19	Bari	41.1214°N 16.88156°E
Diocesan museum of Gallipoli			Via Antonietta De Pace, 51	Gallipoli	40.054998°N 17.976965°E
Teatro Margherita		Former theatre converted in to a contemporary art museum	Piazza Quattro Novembre	Bari	41.1264°N 16.8728°E
Jatta National Archaeological Museum		Former palace housing a 19th century archeological collection	Piazza Giovanni Bovio, 35	Ruvo di Puglia	41°07′00.45″N 16°29′11.09″E
