= Museo Archeologico Nazionale di Campli =

Coordinates: 42.7271°N 13.6877°E

- Location: Campli
- Type: Archaeology museum
- Website: Official website

Museo Archeologico Nazionale di Campli (Italian for National Archaeology Museum of Campli) is an archaeology museum in Campli, Abruzzo.

== History ==
The museum was opened in June 1988 and occupies four rooms in the convent of San Francesco in Campli. The artefacts come from the necropolis of Campovalano where 610 Iron Age and Romanisation burials from the 9th to the 3rd century BC have been found in about forty years of research.

== Collection ==
The exhibition path is divided into three main rooms that house over 30 display cases and showcases containing objects from the funerary furnishings of the burials. There is also an educational path that shows the evolution of the funeral rite.

The oldest funerary monuments are displayed, consisting of large mounds with circles of stones and furnishings that included weapons, bronze utensils, and even war or parade chariots for male burials, while they included bronze fibulae and amber and glass paste jewelry for female burials. Gradually, there is a decrease in the furnishings, transitioning to the classical Roman culture.
