= Cascella =

Cascella is a surname. Notable people with the surname include:

- Basilio Cascella (1860–1950), Italian artist
- Pietro Cascella (1921–2008), Italian painter
- Michele Cascella (1892–1989), Italian artist
- Tommaso Cascella (1890–1968), Italian painter
