= De Sanctis =

De Sanctis may refer to:

== People ==
- Antonio De Sanctis (born 1972), Italian bobsledder
- Benedetto de Sanctis, Bishop of Alessano (1540–1542)
- Cesare De Sanctis (businessman) (died 1881), friend of Giuseppe Verdi
- Francesco de Sanctis (architect) (1679–1731), Italian architect
- Francesco de Sanctis (critic) (1817–1883), Italian literary critic
- Gaetano De Sanctis (1870–1957), Italian historian and lifetime senator (1950–1957)
- Gerardine DeSanctis (1954–2005), American management theorist
- Giacomo de Sanctis, Archbishop of Sorrento (1474–1479)
- Giovanni de Sanctis (born 1949), Italian astronomer
- Giuseppe De Sanctis (1858–1924), Italian painter
- Guglielmo de Sanctis (1829–1911), Italian painter
- Guglielmo De Sanctis (diver) (born 1897), Italian diver
- Italo De Sanctis (1881–1943), Italian painter
- Laura de Sanctis (born 1996), Panamanian model and actress
- St Michael de Sanctis (1591–1625), Discalced Trinitarian priest from Vic, Catalonia
- Morgan De Sanctis (born 1977), Italian football goalkeeper
- Sante De Sanctis (1862–1935), Italian doctor, psychologist and psychiatrist
- Tito Livio De Sanctis (1817–1883), Italian physician

== Places ==
- Castello De Sanctis, medieval castle in Roccacasale, Province of L'Aquila, Abruzzo, Italy
- Morra De Sanctis, town (commune) in the province of Avellino, Campania, Italy.

== Other ==
- 3268 De Sanctis (1981 DD), Main-belt Asteroid discovered in 1981
- De Locis Sanctis, book by the Irish monk Adomnán
- DeSanctis–Cacchione syndrome, an extremely rare disorder characterized by the skin and eye symptoms of xeroderma pigmentosum

== See also ==
- DeSanctis, a surname
- DeSantis
