= De Santi =

de Santi or Desanti is a surname. Notable people with the surname include:

- Antonio Álvarez Desanti (born 1958), Costa Rican politician
- Dominique Desanti (1920–2011), French writer
- Guido De Santi (1923–1998), Italian cyclist
- Marco de Santi (born 1983), Brazilian vert skater
- Jean-Toussaint Desanti (1914–2002), French educator and philosopher

== See also ==
- DeSantis
- De Sanctis (disambiguation)
