= Basilio Cascella Civic Museum =

Museum in Pescara, Italy

- Museo civico Basilio Cascella
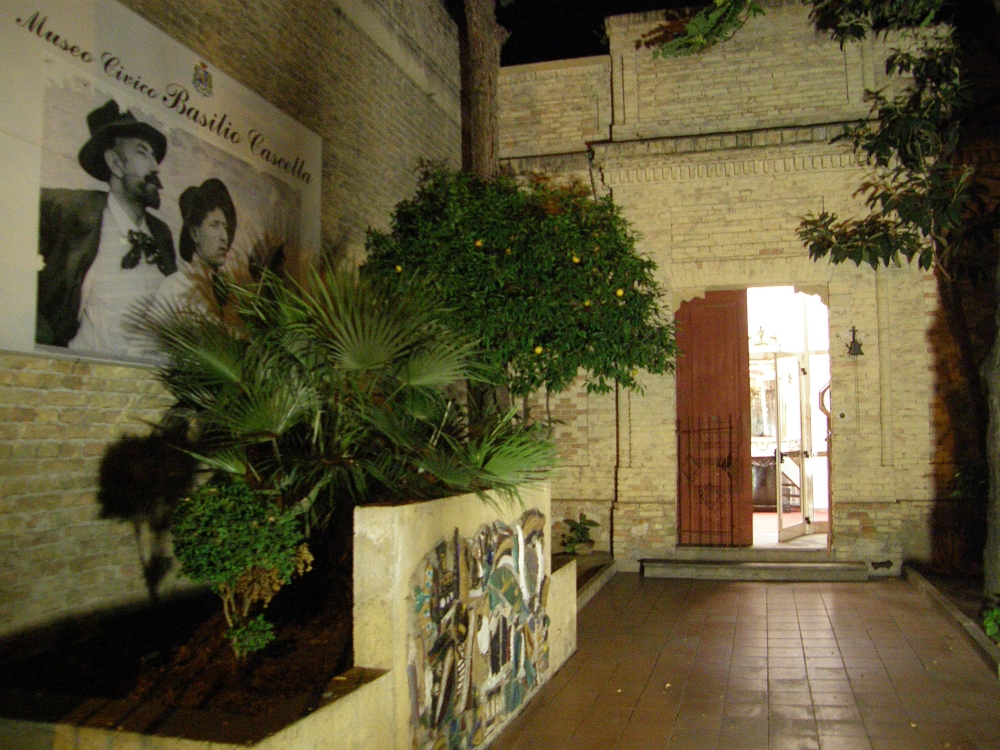
- Established: 1975
- Location: Pescara, Italy
- Type: art museum historic house museum museum of a public entity museum of modern art
- Collection size: 800 item, 500 item
- Visitors: 1,500 (2022)
- Founder: Giuseppe Quieti
- Website: abruzzoturismo.it/en/cascella-municipal-museum-pescara

The Basilio Cascella Civic Museum (Italian: Museo civico Basilio Cascella) is an Italian pinacotheca based in Pescara in the Porta Nuova district. The museum is located in the former lithographic establishment established at the end of the nineteenth century by the painter Basilio Cascella. The building, for half a century the center of artistic production and meeting place for intellectuals such as Gabriele D'Annunzio, Luigi Pirandello, and Giovanni Pascoli, was donated to the Comune of Pescara in 1966 by the heirs of Cascella.

Thanks to the initiative of Giuseppe Quieti, in 1975 the structure was used as a civic museum dedicated to the dynasty of Cascella artists. The art gallery houses a collection of around 600 works of painting, sculpture, ceramics and graphics, created between the 19th and 20th centuries by Basilio Cascella and his descendants, including his sons Tommaso and Michele, and his grandsons Andrea Cascella and Pietro. Since 2017, the museum has been managed by the Genti d'Abruzzo Foundation.

== Location ==
The museum is housed in the former lithographic factory founded by Basilio Cascella in 1895. The building looks like an eclectic two-story villa, characterized by a structure made entirely of terracotta bricks with some artistic majolica. Located in the Porta Nuova district, the art gallery is located in viale Guglielmo Marconi, which in the town's toponymy of those years took the name of via delle Acacie, in reference to the uncultivated and damp territory located between the Port of Pescara and the Aterno-Pescara river.

The villa was the residence of Basilio Cascella until 1929, the year in which he moved to Rome after being elected deputy. Tommaso Cascella, his eldest son, continued to live with his first wife and their six children, including Andrea and Pietro, until 1966, when the villa was donated to the Municipality of Pescara.

The art gallery is separated from Viale Marconi by a courtyard in which majolica made by Cascella are placed. The main body of the museum, which consists of the historical laboratory of the family, has an architecture that stands out from the part added at the time of the expansion of the structure. The museum houses a library with thematic volumes on the art and cultural history of Pescara and a multimedia educational laboratory.

== History ==
After taking part in the exhibitions in Turin (1884), Venice (1887) and London (1888), Basilio Cascella bought land in the Porta Nuova area in 1895 from the Comune of Pescara to build a painting, lithography, and related arts studio, attached to his home. Thus Cascella began an artistic school that in a few years became an important center for local and national culture, attracting a large number of young people. The laboratory guaranteed a solid training for Tommaso, Michele, and Gioacchino Cascella, who started their artistic career under their father's guidance.

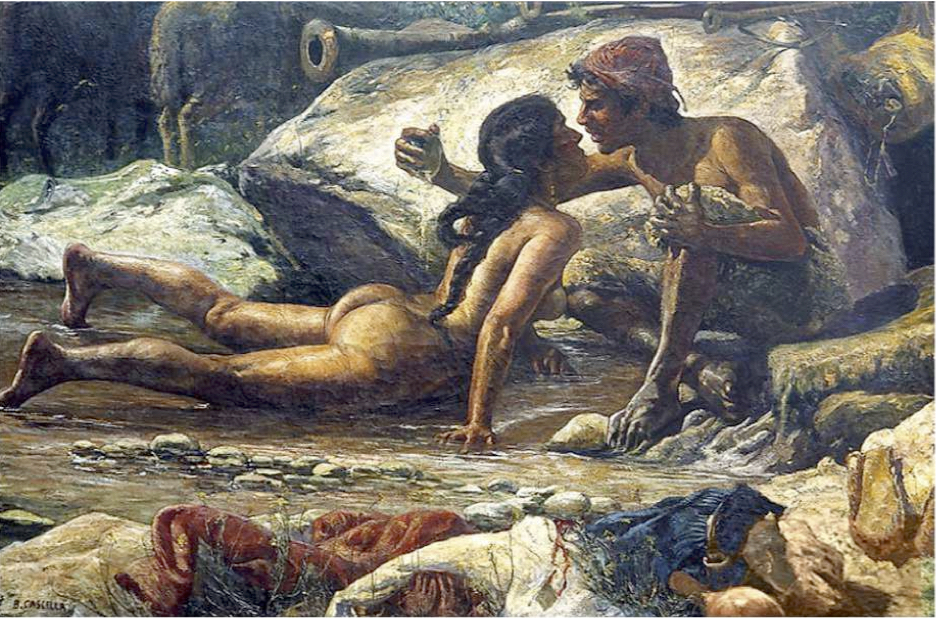
Il bagno della pastora (1903)

After gathering a circle of local writers and artists around him, in 1899 Cascella published the first issue of the magazine L'illustrazione abruzzese. Gabriele D'Annunzio, who used his verses to accompany the illustrations of the magazineis among the collaborators. A literary circle gradually developed around the studio, and also through the magazines L'illustrazione meridionale and La Grande Illustrazione, including Luigi Pirandello, Umberto Saba, Gennaro Finamore, Filippo Tommaso Marinetti, Sibilla Aleramo, Matilde Serao, Grazia Deledda, Ada Negri, Guido Gozzano, and Giovanni Pascoli.

The lithographic activity of the studio continued until 1966, the year in which the laboratory was acquired by the Comune of Pescara. Giuseppe Quieti, a Pescara councilor and later member of the Chamber of Deputies, promoted the establishment of a civic museum dedicated to the art of Basilio Cascella. The museum structure was inaugurated in 1975. The initial collection included around 500 works of painting, sculpture, ceramics and graphics, belonging to the generations of artists of the Cascella family. The original structure has been significantly expanded over the years through the inclusion of works signed by Andrea and Pietro Cascella, sons of Tommaso and grandsons of Basilio. Once managed by the Genti d'Abruzzo Foundation, in 2017, the museum underwent a general restoration; Mariano Cipollini, artistic curator of the museum, establish a new location for the works, reorganized according to a criterion that aims to highlight not only the cultural evolution of the individual artists, but also the historical-cultural evolution of all the members of the family. An ecomuseum (museo diffuso in Italian) dedicated to the sculptural art of Pietro Cascella and entitled Fuga dal Museo was inaugurated in 2018 by Cordelia von den Steinen in collaboration with the civic museum Basilio Cascella.

== Collection ==
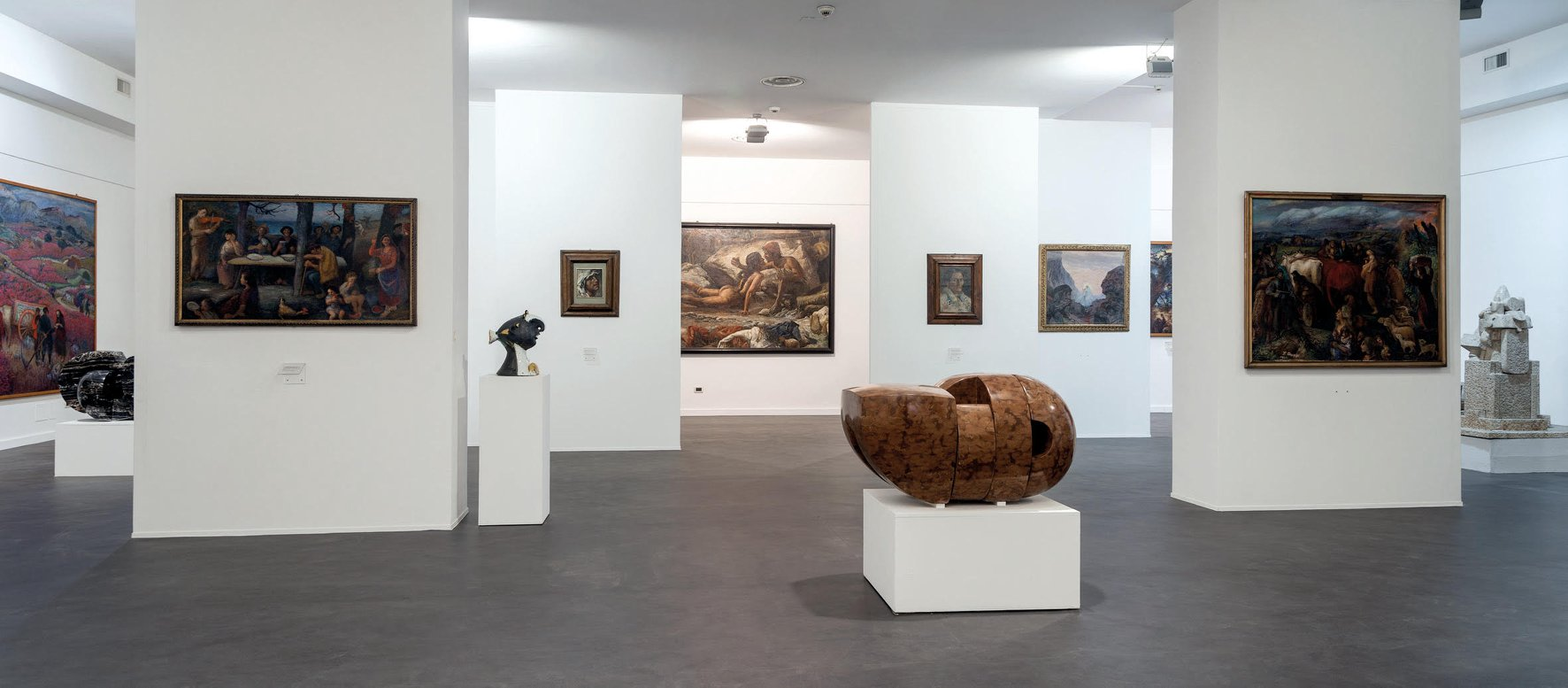
Internal view of the museum

The Basilio Cascella Civic Museum extends over two levels divided into twelve rooms, ten of which are located in the original part of the building and two are located in the new wing. The arrangement of the works dates back to the last restoration that took place during 2018. The art gallery houses about 600 works of the Cascella family, made between the nineteenth and twentieth centuries with various artistic techniques, such as paintings on canvas, ceramics, sculptures, drawings, graphic works and postcards of five generations of artists. A prominent position is occupied by Basilio Cascella's masterpiece entitled Il bagno della pastora (1903), which depicts a young shepherdess in a typically Abruzzese bucolic setting.

Once completed, he sent the work o the Venice Biennale, but the exhibition organizers refused it due to its belated arrival. A postal mistake misplaced the painting during transportation; it was returned to the sender thirty years later, when it was found intact near Ancona. Inside the museum, in addition to original furniture of the time, there are sketches, lithographic stones that served for the famous engravings and numbers of L'illustrazione abruzzese, La Grande Illustrazione, and the Divine Comedy, among others. Some creations of Pietro Cascella are presented with the author's first name only, because of his stylistic choices in contrast with the tastes of the progenitor Basilio, who initially forbade his grandson to use the family name.

== Sources ==
- Gasbarri, Luisa; Tanzillo, Emiliano (2014). 101 perchè sulla storia dell'Abruzzo che non puoi non sapere (in Italian). Roma: Newton Compton. ISBN 9788854171824. OCLC 956061646.
- Giacintuoci, Walter (1994). "Il Museo Basilio Cascella". Abruzzo: Rivista dell'Istituto di studi abruzzesi (in Italian). 32. Rome: Edizioni dell'Ateneo. ISSN 0001-3366.
- Palmerio, Silvana (1978). "CASCELLA, Basilio in "Dizionario Biografico"". Treccani, il portale del sapere (in Italian).
- Rando, Cinzia (1998). Pescara e provincia: il litorale, i parchi nazionali, i borghi antichi, le abbazie [Pescara and province: the coast, national parks, ancient villages, abbeys] (in Italian). Milano Pescara: Touring club italiano Provincia di Pescara. ISBN 9788836511921. OCLC 797734351.
- Russo, Umberto; Battistella, Franco (1997). Pescara: arte e città fra '800 e '900: primo catalogo delle opere d'arte nelle collezioni pubbliche (in Italian). Pescara: Carsa. ISBN 9788885854420. OCLC 38752818.
