= Birthplace of Gabriele D'Annunzio Museum =

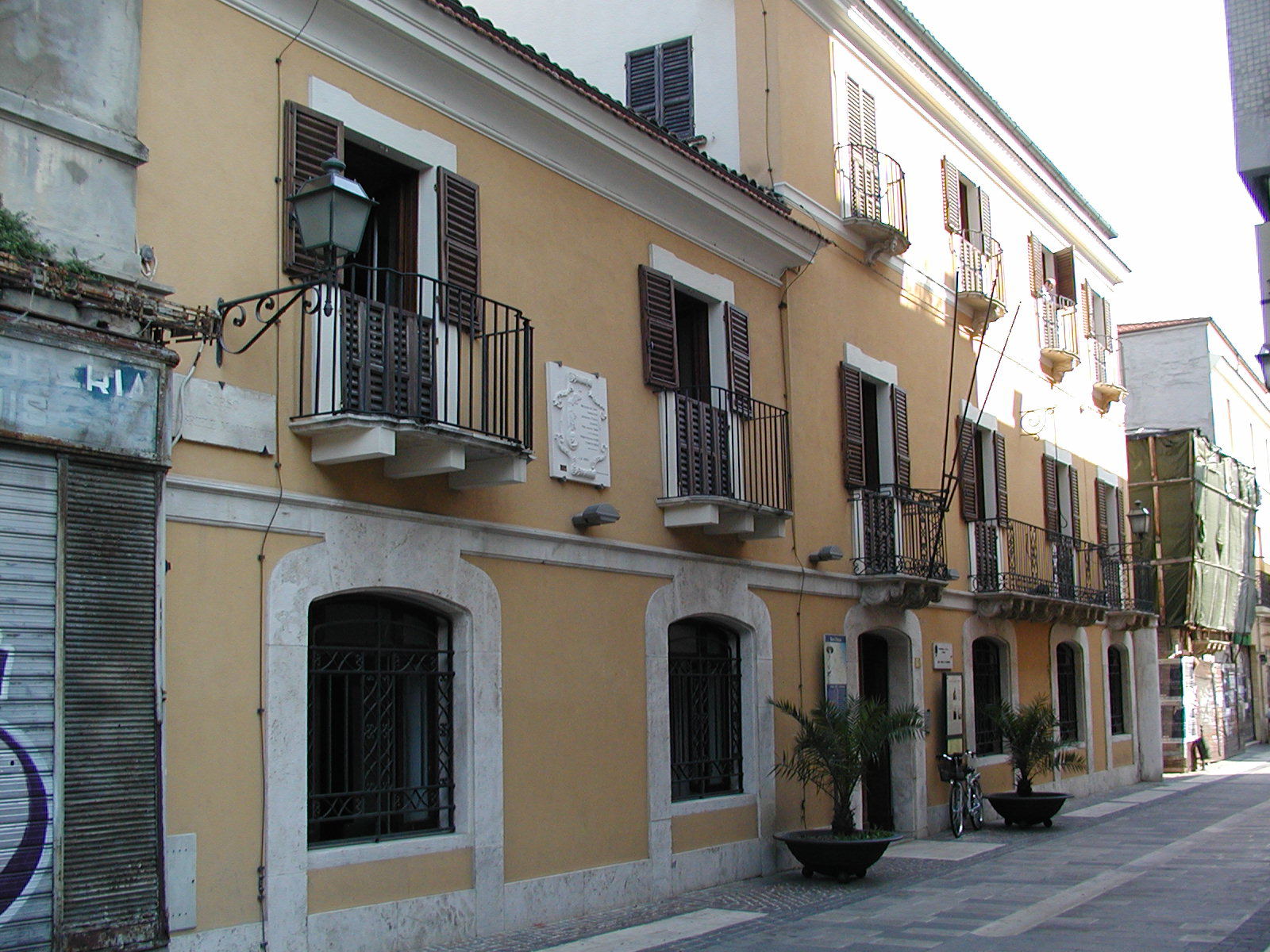
- Museo Casa Natale di Gabriele D'Annunzio

- Location within Abruzzo
- Location: Pescara
- Coordinates: 42.4610°N 14.2118°E
- Type: Historic house museum
- Website: Official website

The Gabriele d'Annunzio Birthplace Museum is located at 116 Corso Manthoné in Pescara and was declared a national monument in 1927. Since December 2014, the Ministry of Cultural Heritage and Activities has managed it through the Polo Museale dell'Abruzzo, which became the Regional Directorate of Museums in December 2019.

== History ==
The 18th-century building, owned by the D'Annunzio family since the 19th century, was declared a national monument in 1927. In 1926, Gabriele D'Annunzio commissioned Antonino Liberi to restore the house to commemorate his mother, Luisa De Benedictis, who died there in 1917. Liberi worked on the renovation until 1928, freeing the ground floor from shops and preserving the loggia, courtyard, well, stables, and storage rooms. D'Annunzio later expressed dissatisfaction with the renovations, particularly the leveling of the three steps that led to the master bedroom, which he revered as "Three altar steps" in Notturno. Subsequently, the poet entrusted the restoration to Giancarlo Maroni, achieving complete restoration only in 1933.

In the same year, the building, which had been under the care of custodian Marietta Camerlengo, was acquired by the Italian State, which immediately began restoration and arrangement works that were completed in 1938.

However, the building suffered significant damage during the World War II bombings; new interventions on the house were completed in 1949. A first museum exhibition was established in 1963 by the "D'Annunzio Foundation" for the exhibition titled "Abruzzo in the Life and Work of G. D'Annunzio," and preserved until 1993, when a new exhibition path was organized.

== Interior ==
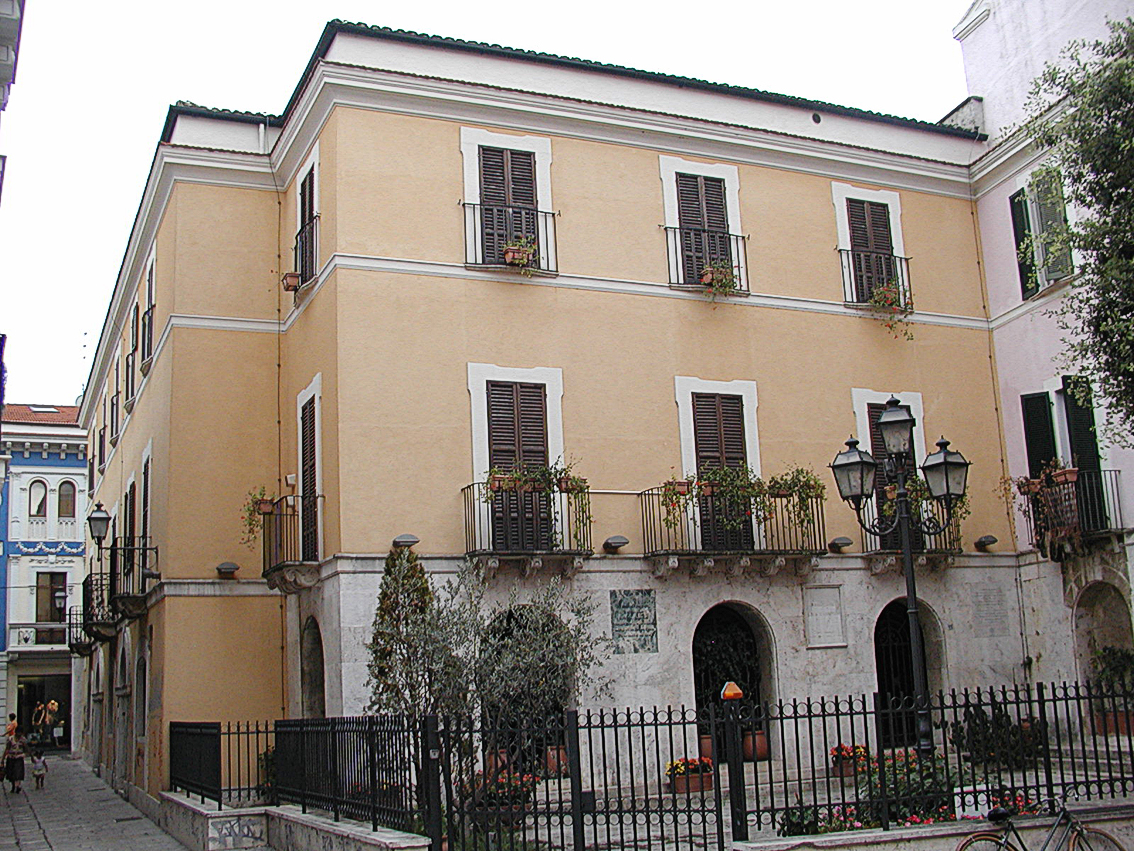
The rear courtyard

The museum, set up on the first floor of the birthplace of Gabriele D'Annunzio, consists of nine rooms and houses furnishings, period furniture, and objects belonging to the writer and his family.

=== Entrance ===
The room is dedicated to D'Annunzio's childhood and contains some educational panels with photographs and quotes from his works, as well as his high school diploma from the Royal Convitto Cicognini of Prato (1881), the decree appointing Francesco Paolo Rapagnetta-D'Annunzio as Mayor for the three-year period 1879–1881, and the certificate of honorary citizenship to D'Annunzio from the Municipality of Chieti on the occasion of the first theatrical performance of "La Figlia di Iorio" (1904).

=== Room I ===
This room corresponds to the living room of the house. It exhibits two lithographs depicting "Vittorio Emanuele II, King of Italy" and "Giuseppe Garibaldi in Marsala", the first by Pietro Barabino and the second by Roberto Focosi; portraits of the adoptive parents of Francesco Paolo Rapagnetta-D'Annunzio ("Anna Giuseppa Lolli" and "Antonio D'Annunzio") and the painting The Rape of Proserpina, all by an anonymous artist of the 19th century.

=== Room II ===
This was the study of Francesco Paolo Rapagnetta-D'Annunzio and contains his childhood portrait by an anonymous artist of the 19th century. The room also hosts a musical lectern used by his brother Antonio, a Japanese plate from the 19th century depicting a landscape with figures, two lithographs depicting Torquato Tasso in the Hospital of Sant'Anna in Ferrara and Torquato Tasso at the Court of France by Ferdinando de Mattheis, two prints with St. Sebastian and St. John the Baptist, and a painting depicting The Flight of Aeneas from Burning Troy, by an anonymous artist of the 19th century.

=== Room III ===
This was the bedroom of Gabriele and his brother Antonio. It contains two 19th-century beds, above which are two paintings (St. Alphonsus Maria de' Liguori and The Immaculate Madonna). There is also a piece of furniture with a raised and mirrored door from the 18th century and a wooden prie-dieu from the 19th century, both belonging to the D'Annunzio family. On the wall is a Christ Carrying the Cross on glass.

=== Room IV ===
This was the room of Aunt Marietta, the eldest sister of D'Annunzio's father, who died in 1906. The room also contains the 19th-century print by G. Palmaroli "Madonna of the Seven Sorrows", a photograph of Luisa de Benedictis, D'Annunzio's mother, a painting by L. Seccia possibly portraying Maria Votruba-Heurenova, a translator of D'Annunzio's works, and a carved wooden chest.

=== Room V ===
This was the bedroom of D'Annunzio's parents. The bed where D'Annunzio was born on March 12, 1863 was stolen during the postwar years. It contains a watercolor painting by Michele Cascella, titled Luisa d'Annunzio's Room (1940), two statuettes made of tow and sculpted papier-mâché depicting St. Anne and Mary as a child, from the 19th century, and 19th-century lithographic prints (The Last Supper of St. Gregory the Great by Paolo Veronese, an Immaculate Madonna by F. De Matteis, a Presentation of Mary at the Temple by Titian, and the Holy Family with St. John the Baptist by Raphael). Additionally, a brass brazier and a chair, also part of the original furnishings, are preserved.

=== Room VI ===
This room, once used as a living room, contains educational panels with photographs of Francavilla al Mare, the hermitage of S. Vito Chietino, the abbey of S. Clemente a Casauria, and the castle of Casoli, along with letters and quotations from D'Annunzio's works. There are also two lithographs by Basilio Cascella ("Luisa d'Annunzio" and a reproduction of "The Penitent Magdalene" by Titian) dated 1904 and 1897, respectively, and a sofa by Franco Summa.

=== Room VII ===
This room, once an annex to the kitchen, has lost its original function due to subsequent restoration interventions. It contains educational panels related to the urban development of the city, the church of S. Cetteo and the Cathedral, the reconstruction of the house's restoration works between 1926 and 1938, the marriage of Gabriele D'Annunzio with Maria Hardouin (1883), and the actress Eleonora Duse. The room also displays objects belonging to D'Annunzio in showcases. The walls feature a collection of photographs and documents, and the painting "Rebecca and Eliezer at the Well" by an unknown 17th-century artist.

=== Room VIII ===
This room preserves the plaster cast of D'Annunzio's right hand and face, molded directly from his corpse, by Arrigo Minerbi (1938), panels illustrating Luisa d'Annunzio's tomb in the Cathedral of S. Cetteo, also by Minerbi, and some of D'Annunzio's works with illustrations by Adolfo De Carolis, Duilio Cambellotti, and Giuseppe Cellini.

=== Room IX ===
This was the living room of the house and hosts educational panels recounting the main episodes of the First World War featuring D'Annunzio, a panel dedicated to the Vittoriale degli Italiani. It also displays two honorary General of Division uniforms, two caps (one of Lieutenant Colonel and one of Major of the Lancieri di Novara), and period photographs.
