= Santis (disambiguation) =

Santis or Säntis refers to:

- Säntis, a mountain in Switzerland
- Canton of Säntis, a former canton in Switzerland named after the above mountain
- Säntis (ship, 1957), a ship on Lake Zurich

== See also ==
- DeSantis (or De Santis), a common surname
