= Roberto Stampa =

Italian architect

Roberto Stampa (Naples, 17 August 1858 - after 1911) was an Italian architect.

== Biography ==
He studied at the Royal School of Engineering Applications of Naples in 1886. He also gained a degree as master of design from the Institute of Fine Arts in 1877. He won a position as Assistant Professor of Architecture at the University of Naples, and his post was renewed two years later. He was awarded with honorable mention in a contest, while he studied at the Institute of Fine Arts. He has collaborated in the urban planning of the Rioni Vasto and Orientale in Naples; he directed construction of various highways and projects working for four years as an engineer of the Society of Construction in Naples. He designed and directed the construction of factories in Mergellina.

He worked under architect Antonio Curri, as a colleague of the architect Alfonso Guerra, the painters, Paolo Vetri, Vincenzo Volpe, and Giuseppe De Sanctis, and the sculptor Francesco Jerace, in creating the hexagonal pavilion of Campania, Basilicata, and Calabria displayed at the Roman Exposition of 1911.
