= DeSantis =

DeSantis (or De Santis or de Santis) is an Italian surname.

Individuals with the surnames DeSantis, De Santis, or de Santis include:

- Ann Desantis (born 1946), American journalist
- Antonio De Santis (1931–2014), Italian poet
- Carla DeSantis Black (born 1958), American music writer
- Casey DeSantis (born 1980), American First Lady of Florida
- Dan DeSantis (1918–2004), American football running back
- Derek DeSantis, American rock bassist (Twisted Method)
- Dina De Santis (1932–1985), Italian actress
- Eduardo De Santis (1929–2019), Italian actor, producer, and writer
- Eros De Santis (born 1997), Italian football player
- Francesco De Santis (born 1944), Italian canoeist
- Giacomo De Santis (born 1995), Italian rugby union player
- Giuseppe De Santis (1917–1997), Italian film director
- Inma de Santis (1959–1989), Spanish actress
- Ivan De Santis (born 1997), Italian soccer player
- Jaclyn DeSantis (born 1979), American actress
- Jason DeSantis (born 1986), American ice hockey player
- Jeriel De Santis (born 2002), Venezuelan footballer
- Joe DeSantis (born 1957), American basketball player, coach, and commentator
- Joe De Santis (1909–1989), American radio and television personality
- John DeSantis (born 1973), Canadian actor
- Lucio De Santis (1922–2006), Italian actor
- Mark DeSantis (businessman) (born 1959), American businessman
- Mark DeSantis (ice hockey) (born 1972), Canadian ice hockey player and coach
- Marko DeSantis, American rock guitarist for Sugarcult
- Massimo De Santis (born 1962), Italian football referee
- Nick De Santis (born 1967), Canadian soccer player
- Nicolas De Santis (born 1966), Italian businessman
- Orazio De Santis (1530–1584), Italian Renaissance engraver
- Orchidea De Santis (born 1948), Italian actress
- Pasqualino De Santis (1927–1996), Italian cinematographer
- Renato De Santis, designer of the Flag of Toronto
- Riccardo De Santis (born 1980), Italian baseball player
- Rita de Santis (born 1954), Canadian politician
- Ron DeSantis (born 1978), American politician, current governor of Florida
- Sergio De Santis (born 1953), Italian short story writer
- Stanley DeSantis (1953–2005), American actor and businessman
- Tony DeSantis (1914–2007), American entrepreneur
- Tullio DeSantis (born 1948), American artist, writer, and teacher
- Vincent DeSantis (born 1948), American politician

== See also ==
- De Sanctis (disambiguation)
- De Santi
