= San Martino sulla Marrucina =

- Comune
- Comune di San Martino sulla Marrucina
- Coat of arms

- Location within Italy Location within Abruzzo
- Coordinates: 42°14′N 14°13′E
- Country: Italy
- Region: Abruzzo
- Province: Chieti (CH)
- Frazioni: Colle di Paolo, Fontana, Gamberale

Government
  - Mayor: Settembrino Giandonato

Area
  - Total: 7 km^{2} (2.7 sq mi)
- Elevation: 420 m (1,380 ft)

Population (Dec. 2004)
  - Total: 1,029
  - Density: 150/km^{2} (380/sq mi)
- Demonym: Sanmartinesi
- Time zone: UTC+1 (CET)
  - Summer (DST): UTC+2 (CEST)
- Postal code: 66010
- Dialing code: 0871
- Patron saint: St. Joseph
- Saint day: March 19

San Martino sulla Marrucina is a comune and town in the province of Chieti in the Abruzzo region of Italy.

== Notable people ==
- Tito Livio De Sanctis (1817-1883) - physician
