= Jean-Gérard Bursztein =

French psychoanalyst

Jean-Gerard Bursztein (born 9 October 1945) is a French psychoanalyst who has a doctorate in philosophy. He teaches psychoanalysis and practices in Paris. He was a student of Jean-Toussaint Desanti and worked on both philosophy of mathematics and philosophy of science. He continues to explore this field in studying the intrication of psychoanalysis and mathematics. On the basis of his practice he has written the following publications :

== Books ==
- Qu’est-ce que l’appareil psychique? NEF, 2000/ What is psychic apparatus? NEF, 2000.
- Le renouveau de la psychanalyse dans l’hypothèse borroméenne, NEF, 2004/ Renewal of psychoanalysis in borromean hypothesis, NEF, 2004.
- Sur la différence entre la psychanalyse et les psychothérapies, NEF, 2004.
  - English: On the Difference between psychoanalysis and psychotherapy, New Freudian Studies, 2008.
- Structure et Psychose, NEF, 2005/ Structure and psychosis, NEF, 2005.
- Vers une mathématique de l’inconscient, NEF, 2006/ Towards a mathematics of the unconscious, NEF, 2006.
- Névrose, nœud borroméen, espace de Hilbert, NEF, 2006/ Neurosis, borromean knot, Hilbert space, NEF, 2006.
- La structure mœbienne de la bisexualité, NEF, 2007/ The moebian structure of bisexuality, NEF, 2007.
  - German: Die Struktur der Andersheit Mann-Frau, TURIA & KANT, Wien, 2007
- Introduction à la science psychanalytique en 2007, NEF, 2007/ Introduction to psychoanalytical science in 2007, NEF, 2007.
  - German: Die Psychoanalyse – eine paradoxe Wissenshaft, Verlag TURIA & KANT, Wien, 2012.
  - Chinese: « 精神分析科学 » (Jing shen fen xi ke xue), edited by 北京师范大学出版社，(Bei Jing shi fan da xue chu ban she, Beijing Normal University Press and Co.).
- Jouissance féminine et hypothèse mathématique du continu, NEF, 2008/ Female orgasm and mathematical continuum hypothesis, NEF, 2008.
- Introduction à la science psychanalytique, Paris, HERMANN, 2009/ Introduction to psychoanalytical science, Paris, Hermann, 2009.
- Nazisme et Shoah, une approche psychanalytique, 2e édition, Paris, HERMANN, 2010/ Nazism and Shoah, a psychoanalytical approach, Paris, HERMANN, 2010.
  - Hebrew: Ha-psychoanalysah Chel ha natzizm, Resling, Israël, 2004.
- Différence entre psychanalyse et psychothérapies, 2e édition revue et corrigée, Paris, Hermann, 2012/ On the difference between psychoanalysis and psychotherapy, Paris, HERMANN, 2012.
- Sur l'espace subjectif, Paris, HERMANN, 2012/ On subjective space, Paris, HERMANN, 2012.
- La différence homme/femme dans la sexuation, Paris, HERMANN, 2015/ The difference between man and woman in sexuation, Paris, HERMANN, 2015.
- Topological transformation of Freud's theory, Karnac Books, 2015.
- L'inconscient, son espace-temps, sa topologie, Etudes Psychanalytiques Lacaniennes, 2016/ The Unconscious, its spacetime, its topology, Psychoanalytical Lacanian Studies, 2016.
- Cohérence philosophique de la psychanalyse, sur l'orthos logos, Etudes Psychanalytiques Lacaniennes, 2016/ Philosophical consistency of psychoanalysis, on orthos logos, Psychoanalytical Lacanian Studies, 2016.
- Topologie subjective et clinique du psychanalyste, Etudes Psychanalytiques Lacaniennes, 2016/ Subjective topology and the psychoanalyst's clinic, Psychoanalytical Lacanian Studies, 2016.
- My lexicon of psychoanalysis, Hermann, 2019.
- Subjective topology, a lexicon, Hermann, 2019.
- The unconscious, its spacetime: Aristotle, Lacan, Poincaré, Hermann, 2019.

For several years he has conducted a research seminar in the Ecole Pratique des Hautes Etudes (Practical School of High Studies, EPHE), with Arnaud Serandour: "A Psychoanalytic Commentary on the Hebrew Bible". On the basis of this research, he has published:

- Expérience hébraïque antique du salut et psychanalyse, sur Yonah/Jonas, Paris, HERMANN, 2010/Ancient hebraic experience of the Salvation and psychoanalysis, on Yonah, Paris, HERMANN, 2010.
  - German: "Antike hebräische Heilserfahrung und Psychoanalyse. Das Buch Jonah", TURIA & KANT, Wien, 2009.
- L'Ecclésiaste. Une approche psychanalytique, Paris, HERMANN, 2013/ Ecclesiastes, a psychoanalytical approach, Paris, HERMANN, 2013.
- Un commentaire psychanalytique de la Bible hébraïque, 2015/ A psychoanalytical commentary on the Hebrew Bible, 2015.
- Parachot Hachavova beri ha Psychoanalyza, Idra, Israël, 2017.
