= Basilio Cascella =

Italian painter (1860–1950)

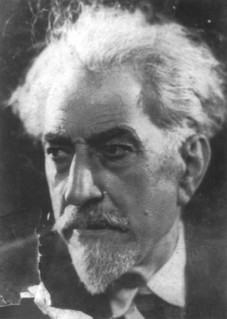
- Born: 1 October 1860 (Note: The sources do not agree on Cascella's birthday: the Biographical Dictionary (Dizionario-Biografico 1978) indicates 1 October; the Italian Encyclopedia (Enciclopedia-Italiana) on 1 August.); Pescara
- Died: 24 July 1950 (aged 89); Rome
- Known for: painting, lithography, ceramics
- Style: Verismo
- Spouse: Concetta Palmerio (1889 - ?)

Basilio Cascella (1 October 1860 - 24 July 1950) was an Italian artist, active from the late nineteenth century to the mid-twentieth century.

== Biography ==
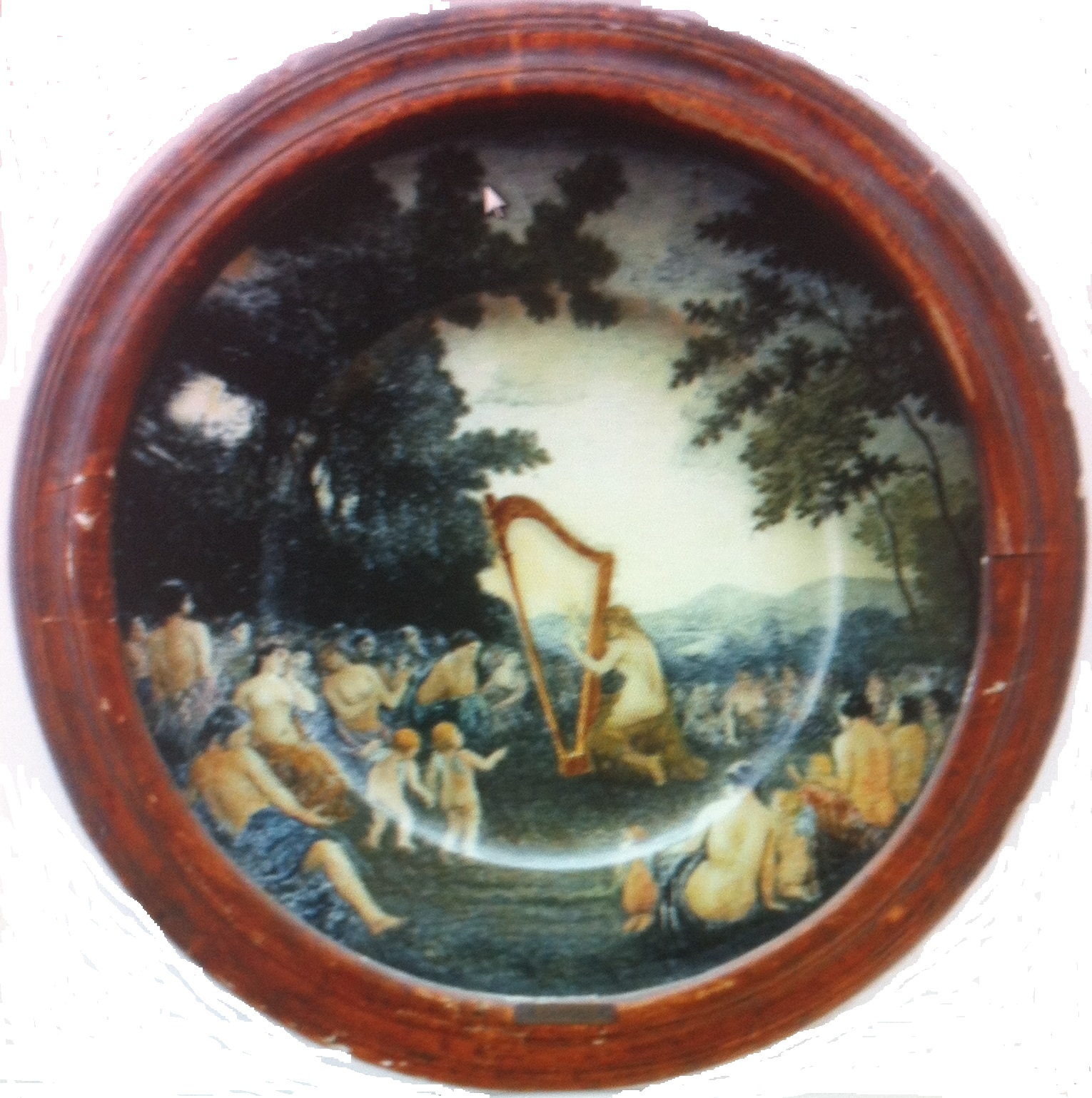
A ceramic by Basilio Cascella

In 1860, Cascella was born to Francesco Paolo Cascella, a tailor, and his wife, Marianna Siciliano. The family moved to Ortona in 1870. It was in this city that Basilio spent his childhood and finished elementary school. He then attended the Artieri night school in Pescara and worked as an apprentice in the Luigi Salomone printing plant. His first drawings date back to 1874, copied from the prints. His father wanted Cascella to help in the tailor shop, but the boy had little interest in becoming a tailor. Instead, in April 1875, he went to Rome and was hired as an apprentice at lithography in the Luigi Salomone printing plant. In 1879, he settled in Naples and came into contact with many other artists, including Domenico Morelli and Francesco Paolo Michetti. Cascella began painting in the Verismo style.

Cascella worked in painting, graphic design and illustration. He later moved to Milan where he opened a lithographic illustration factory. He exhibited some works at the National Artistic Exhibion of Turin in 1884 and at the Art Exhibition of Venice in 1887 (together with artists such as Giovanni Segantini, John Singer Sargent, Giacomo Grosso, Cesare Tallone, Antonio Mancini, and Federico Bernagozzi). He also exhibited at shows in London (1888) and in Palermo (1891). Three of his sons, Tommaso Cascella, Michele Cascella, and Gioacchino Cascella also became artists. Back in his hometown, Cascella resumed relations with Michetti and became part of the Convento Michetti, frequented, at the time, by Gabriele D'Annunzio, Francesco Paolo Tosti, Costantino Barbella and other well-known Abruzzese artists, writers and men of culture. On 30 January 1895, the city council of the city deliberated the transfer of land to allow Cascella to build a lithographic and painting studio. In 1898, he took part in the Italian General Exhibition in Turin.

In 1899, after having gathered around him a cenacle of local writers and artists, Cascella published the first issue of the magazine "L'lustration Abruzzo". Gabriele d'Annunzio stands out among the collaborators. Other stimuli to the magazine come from the research on the folklore of Antonio De Nino, Gennaro Finamore and Ignazio Cerasoli.

Subsequently, he edited the magazine L'illustrazione meridionale [The Southern Illustration] and in 1905 resumed with a second series L'illustrazione abruzzese [The Abruzzese Illustration], followed by La Grande Illustrazione [The Great Illustration]. Luigi Pirandello, Umberto Saba, Gennaro Finamore, Filippo Tommaso Marinetti, Sibilla Aleramo, Matilde Serao, Grazia Deledda, Ada Negri, Guido Gozzano, and Giovanni Pascoli all contributed to the magazines. Cascella also contributed to the Milanese magazine Varietas.

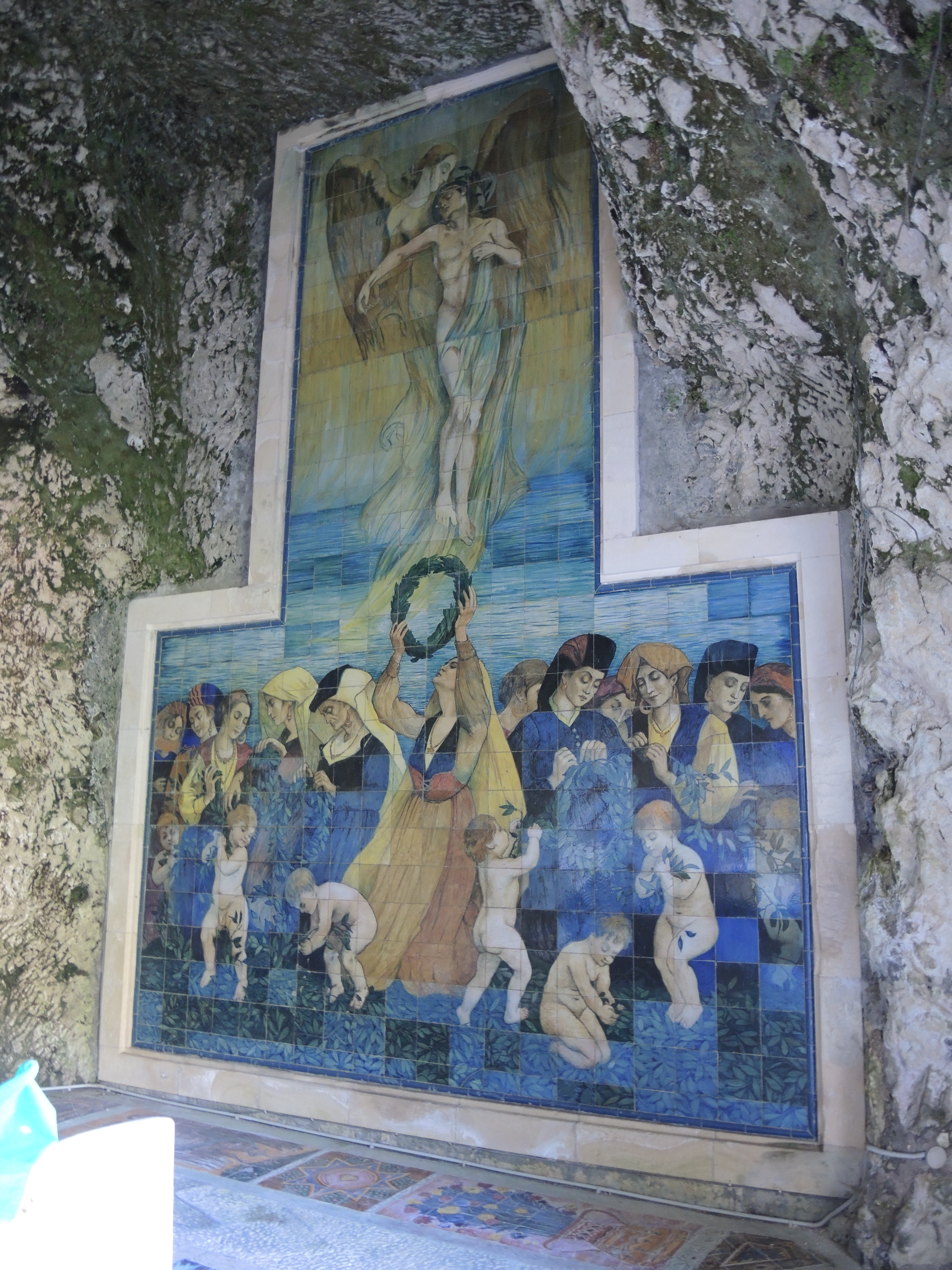
Panel of the shrine to the fallen of Bocca di Valle

In 1917, he moved with his children to Rapino, where he devoted himself to the activity of a ceramist. In 1924, he made the three polychrome panels depicting the Pietà, l'Eroe del mare and l'Eroe della montagna for the tomb of the Abruzzese hero Andrea Bafile created by the sculptor Felicetto Giuliante in the cave of Bocca di Valle near Guardiagrele on the Maiella; in 1926 seven large panels for the gallery of the dispensing counters of the Terme del Tettuccio in Montecatini; in 1930 five large panels with views of Italian cities for the gallery of the Milano Centrale railway station; in 1939 the decorative panels for the Messina maritime station designed by his son Michele.

In the 1920s, he joined the National Fascist Party. On 24 March 1929 he was elected deputy for the XXVIII legislature of the Kingdom of Italy, a position he held until 1934.

He remained active as he grew old and created numerous works, including the canvas for the wedding of the Prince of Piedmont at Villa Savoia in Rome in 1930, the allegorical paintings La terra e Il mare for the Government Palace of Bolzano in 1934 in collaboration with son Tommaso, The Day of Faith at the Quirinale Palace in Rome, Italian People and Fabbro at the Ministry of the Interior in Rome, Trebbia del Grano at the Ministry of Agriculture. He was present at various exhibitions including the Rome Quadriennale of 1931, the Fourth Exhibition of the Fascist Provincial Union of Fine Arts of Abruzzo and Molise in Campobasso in 1937. He held his last solo show in Milan in 1948. Cascella died in Rome in 1950.

In 1955, the annual Basilio Cascella Award was initiated in Ortona in the Province of Chieti.

== Work and style ==
When Cascella was stationed in the military at Pavia in 1880, he met Metardo Rosso and Vincenzo Irolli, and started painting. After moving to Milan, Basilio found Metardo Rosso and met Aleardo Villa, who introduced him to the "Famiglia artistica" ["artistic family"], and began his study of the nude. Works from this period include Ritratto della madre [Portrait of the mother], Ritratto di Vincenzo Irolli [Portrait of Vincenzo Irolli], Allegoria dell'amore [Allegory of love ](watercolor), Testa di arabo [Head of an Arab], and Figura di donna [Figure of a woman] (pastel), all preserved in the Basilio Cascella Civic Museum in Pescara.. Back in Abruzzo in 1883, he frescoed the council chamber of the Municipality of Ortona, which was destroyed in the cannonades of December 1943. The next year he participated in the Italian General Exhibition of Contemporary Art, held in Turin, with the painting Mantello e sottabito inspired by Abruzzo, then was at the 1887 National Art Exhibition in Venice, in London in 1888, and at the 1893 Italian Exhibition in Naples. l suono e il sonno [Sound and sleep], now preserved in Chieti, was shown at the 1984 Triennial Exhibition of the Academy of Brera in Milan. This work portrays an Arcadian subject, a shepherd who serenades his woman to sleep with the sound of his Zampognabagpipes. The background contains a dream-like portrayal of female nudes. The work is kept in the Pinacoteca Cascella di Ortona in the Palazzo Farnese and subsequently appeared at the Exposition of the Society of Fine Arts of Rome. In 1895–96, Cascella created L'infeconda [The infecund], oil on canvas, presenting a pastoral theme of Abruzzo. In 1903, he finished Il bagno della pastora, preserved in Pescara, for the Venice Biennale, a painting that was not exhibited due to its late arrival. In the same year in Pescara, where he had settled, he started a chromolithographic establishment, giving life to the journal L'illustrazione abruzzese [The illustration of Abruzzo], in collaboration with Vincenzo Bucci and Francesco Paolo Michetti, which was a periodical dedicated to regional art and culture. Between the first and second series of 1905, only 10 issues were published, while in the same period the Cascella was artistic director of Tribuna illustrata [Illustrated Tribune] (1890) and the L'illustrazione meridionale [Southern Illustration] (1900).

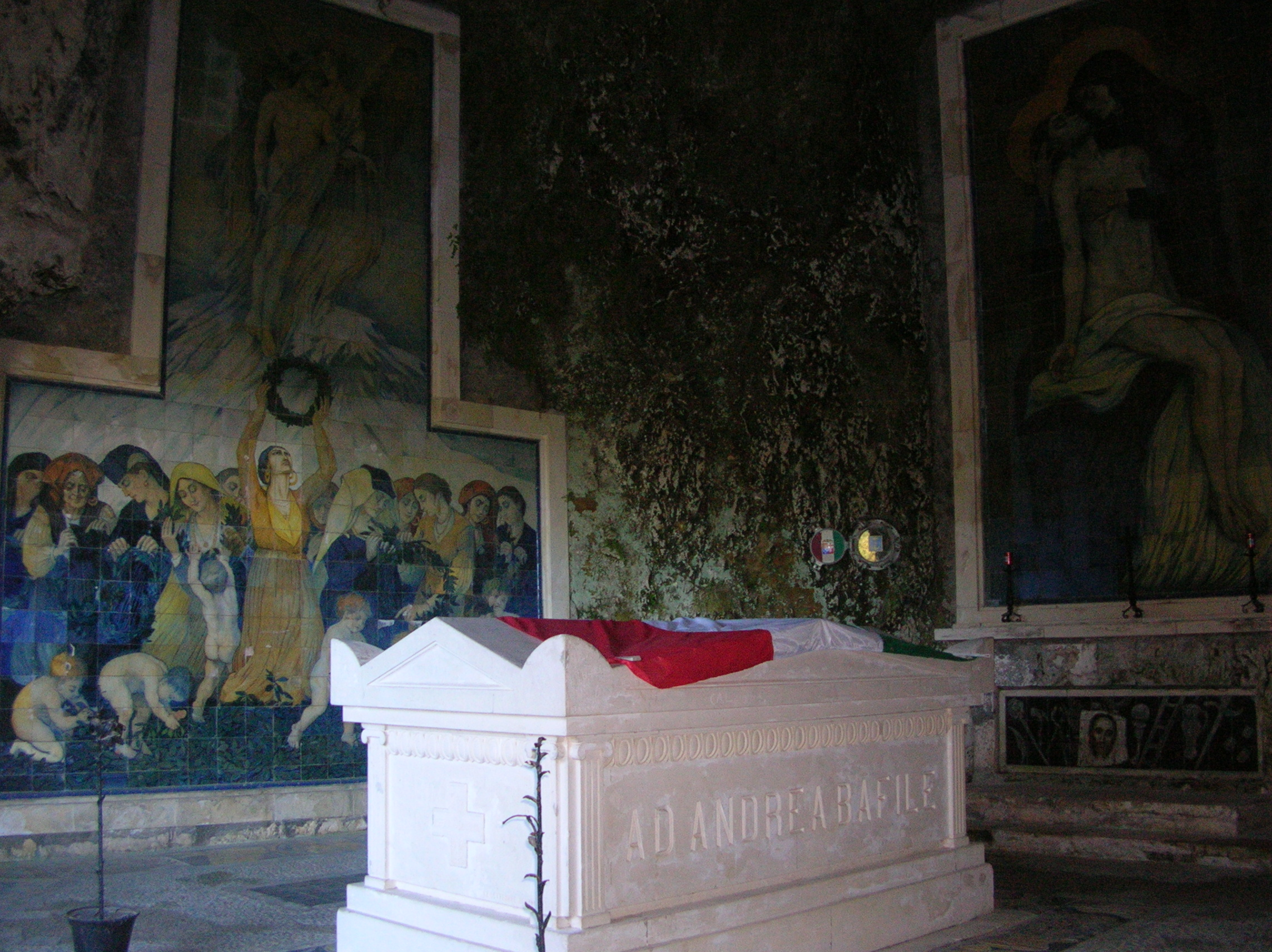
The shrine of Andrea Bafile in Guardiagrele (1924)

This typographical interest was revived in Basilio in 1914 when in Pescara he was able to print a new magazine, La grande illustrazione [The great illustration], which he directed for a year. The magazine took advantage of the collaboration of Italian and foreign artists, in the first year it was anti-D'Annunzio and anti-Futurist, as far as literature was concerned, and it was also anti-impressionist for the artistic field. The entry of Italy into war overturned the magazine's thematic approach: interventionist, he included among his collaborators Sivilla Aleramo, his sons Michele and Tommaso, then the writings of Luigi Pirandello, Guido Gozzano, Filippo Tommaso Marinetti, the Negri, Baldini, the Sartorio, the Previati, the Irolli, the Spadini, and Umberto Boccioni. From the factory in Pescara, a series of illustrated postcards also came out with special colors and techniques, with which Cascella engraved lithographic stones, preserved in the museum of Pescara (20 in all), large sepia and Siena prints, illustrated tables of the Divine Comedy, and for lithic works such as the Vespri siciliani [Sicilian Vespers] and Othello, illustrations of novels, labels for Abruzzo desserts and liqueurs. Much of the production was exhibited together with the collection of L'illustrazione abruzzese [The Abruzzese Illustration] in the Chieti Art Exhibition in 1905, for which Basilio also produced posters.

In 1904, Cascella created the etching Ritratto della madre di D'Annunzio [Portrait of the mother of D'Annunzio], donated to the poet on the occasion of the visit to Chieti for the representation of the tragedy La figlia di Iorio [The Daughter of Iorio], and the lithograph Bacio materno [Maternal kiss] preserved in the Costantino Barbella Art Museum, The Triumph of Death (1905), etching preserved in the Galleria Nazionale d'Arte Moderna, head of Medusa, 1905, preserved in Rome, Canto-ebro of 1905, preserved in Chieti, The source of 1906 oil on canvas exhibited in Milan in the opening of the Galleria del Sempione, and destroyed in second World War. In 1901 Basilio Cascella participated with La voce dei venti, lithograph preserved in the Pinacoteca of Chieti, at the National Exhibition of Fine Arts in Milan. In 1907 he was in contact with the Drouot Gallery in Paris for an exhibition of the paintings of lilies Tommaso and Michele.

He stayed in Milan between 1910–1912, worked for the magazine La Natura published by Vallardi, while between 1917 and 18 he moved to the center of Rapino in the Chieti area, interested by the new means of expression of ceramics, which in the country had begun in the mid-1800s, revived by Fedele Cappelletti and Gabriele Vitacolonna. The Cascella collected the popular legacy of bucolic pastoral painting on majolica, and also made tesserae and wall panels, such as the Monument to Andrea Bafile in the Bocca di Valle cave in Guardiagrele, Lieutenant of the Royal Navy of L'Aquila origins, which fell in 1918.In addition to the proven collections of the Cascella Museum in Pescara, dishes, tiles, panels with mythological and pastoral subjects, amphorae, and vases are preserved, such as L'allegoria dell'amore [The Allegory of Love] in 1925, while the Portrait of Francesco Paolo Tosti (1925).

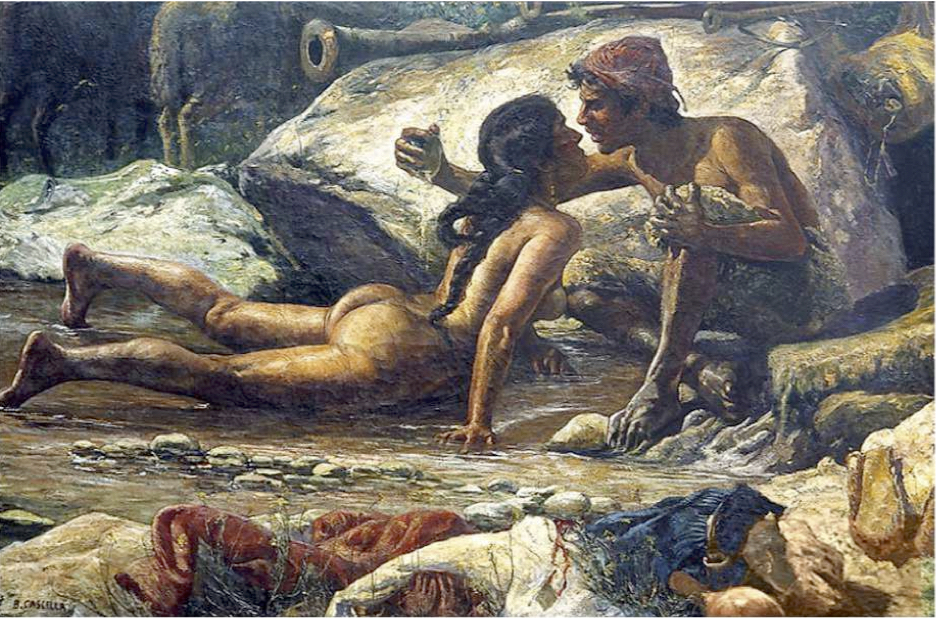
Il bagno della pastora (1903), preserved at the Basilio Cascella Civic Museum in Pescara

In 1924, Cascella collaborated with his son Tommaso for the construction of the shrine of Andrea Bafile in Guardiagrele. In 1927, he decorated the Galleria dei Banchi at the Tettuccio plant in Montecatini with seven panels of allegorical figures. From 1930-31 he decorated the Head Gallery of the station of Milan, with five panels depicting the 5 Italian Cities, and the royal waiting room. In collaboration with Tommaso and designed by Michele, he executed the mosaic decoration of the Messina station in 1939–40. Large-scale majolica on the D'Annunzio themes of Iorio's daughter, the bridal coffers, with ceramic panels or round pieces were exhibited at Monza in the II and III International Exhibition of Decorative Arts, then in Rome at the Exposition of the Cultori di Belle Arti Society, and finally in the galleries in Pesaro and Milan in 1929 together with the works of Michele Cascella.

After moving to Rome in 1928, where he remained until his death, Basilio directed his production to celebrate, among other things, events of the fascist regime, his continuous presence in the artistic sector, had increased his fame, in 1929 he entered the Parliament, becoming Master of Art. Interested in artistic education, in parliamentary discussions he argued that art should end "in the application that forms the pride of the nations", allowing the fascist state to use art for the purpose of exalting itself.

In 1931, Cascella was present in Rome at the 1st Quadrennial Modern Art Exhibition. In 1927, he exhibited at the 4th Exhibition of the Fascist Provincial Union of Fine Arts of Abruzzo and of Molise, in Campobasso, the tempera. Mother of D'Annunzio together with pastels and ceramics. The later works are the Marriage of His Highness King Prince of Piedmont (1930) at Villa Savoia, La giornata della Fede (Rome, Quirinal Palace), Italian People and Fabbro (1936–41), preserved at the time at the Ministry of the Interior, Trebbia del grano, already in Rome at the Ministry of Agriculture, and the composition allegory Trionfo della Libertà of 1947. In 1934, he painted with his son Tommaso the two paintings with allegory Terra e Mare for the reception hall of the Palazzo del Governo in Bolzano.

Most of Cascella's work is kept in the Basilio Cascella Civic Museum in Pescara. Other works are collected at the Prefectural Picture Gallery in Chieti, in the Cascella Modern and Contemporary Art Picture Gallery, and in the Farnese Palace in Ortona. Some personal portraits of D'Annunzio and his mother Luisa de Benedictis are located in the poet's birthplace in Pescara. Basilio Cacsella is also known for the annual award for modern art that is celebrated in Pescara.

== See also ==
- Basilio Cascella Civic Museum
- Michele Cascella
- Pietro Cascella
- Tommaso Cascella

== Sources ==
- De Romanis, Alfonso. "CASCELLA, Basilio". Treccani, l'Enciclopedia italiana (in Italian). Archived from the original on 3 September 2014.
- Palmerio, Silvana (1978). "CASCELLA, Basilio in "Dizionario Biografico"". Treccani, il portale del sapere (in Italian).
- Wulf, Harm (21 March 2013). "Basilio Cascella: l'anima arcana dell'Abruzzo" [Basilio Cascella: the arcane soul of Abruzzo]. Centro Studi La Runa (in Italian).
  - An English translation: "Basilio Cascella". Galleria d'Arte Thule.
