= International Monument to the Victims of Fascism =

Memorial in Auschwitz II–Birkenau

- Międzynarodowy Pomnik Ofiar Obozu
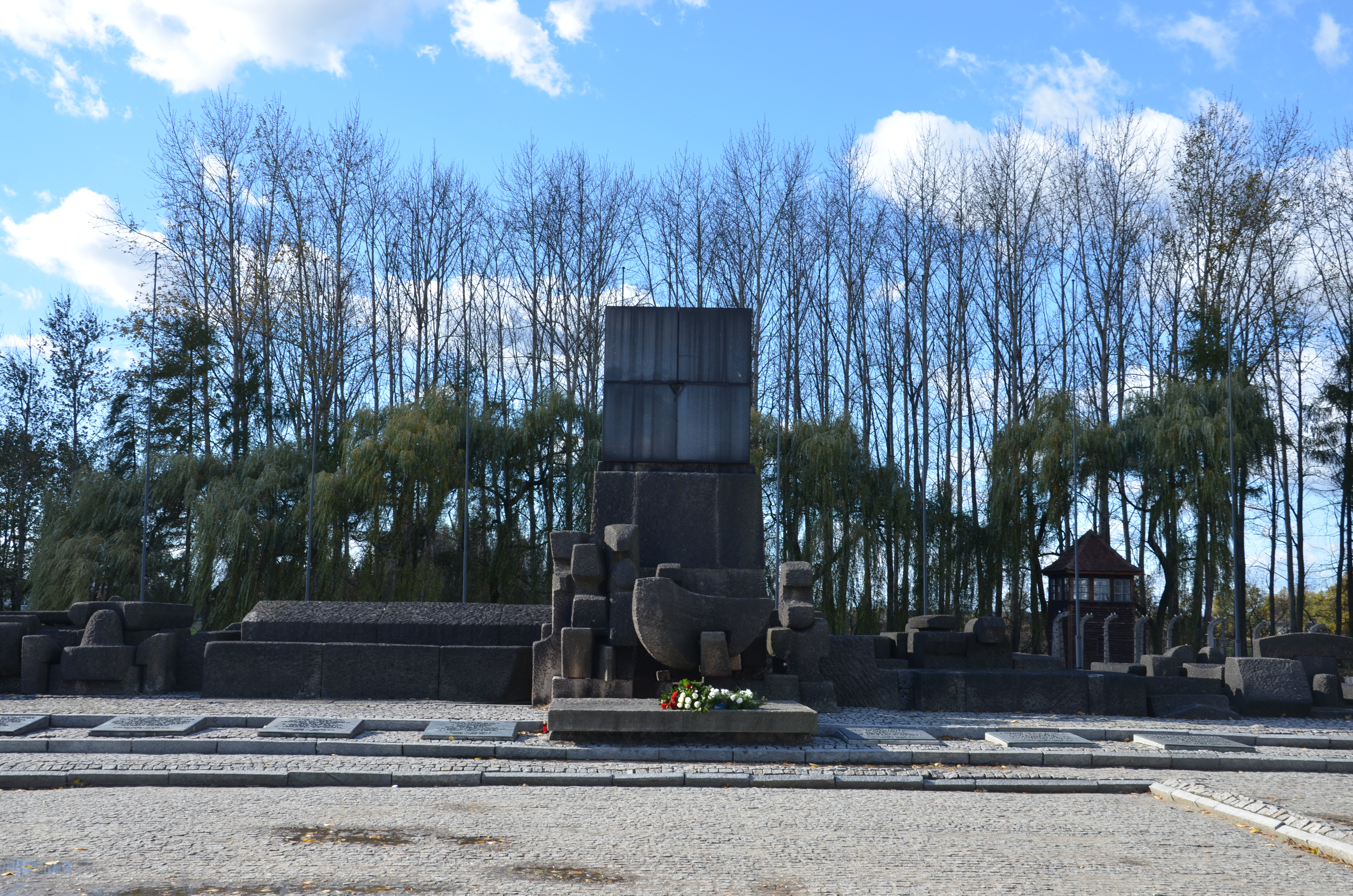
- Interactive map of International Monument to the Victims of Fascism
- Location: Auschwitz II-Birkenau
- Coordinates: 50.03472°N 19.16897°E
- Dedicated date: 16 April 1967
- Dedicated to: victims of Fascism

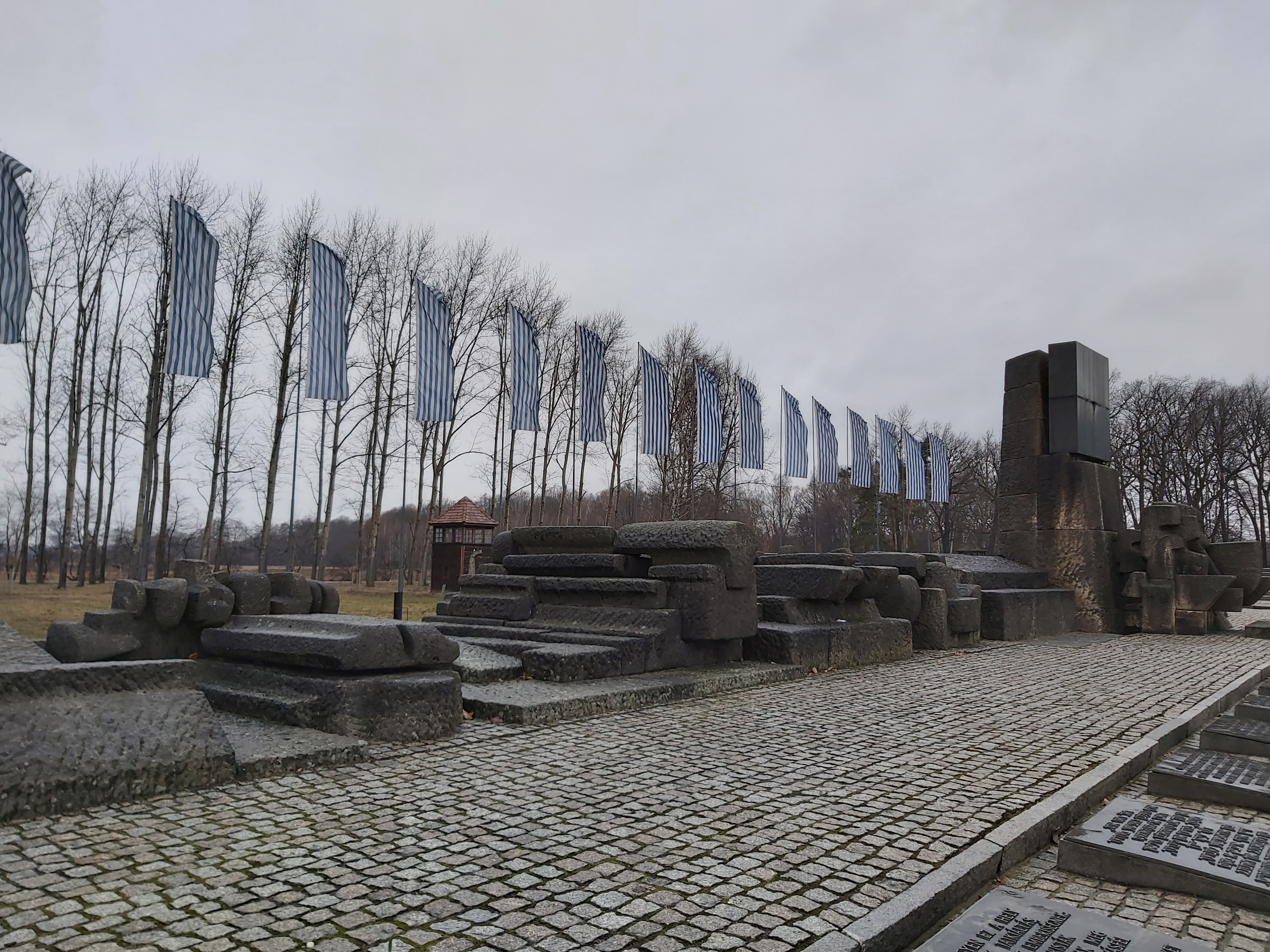
The full extent of the monument; the tower is off-set to the right or north from the end of the railway lines

The International Monument to the Victims of Fascism (Polish: Międzynarodowy Pomnik Ofiar Obozu, lit. International Monument to the Victims of the Camp) is a commemorative monument in the Auschwitz II–Birkenau concentration camp in Birkenau (now Brzezinka) in southern Poland. It lies at the western end of the railway lines which cross the camp from the main gate. The monument was designed by Italian architects Andrea and Pietro Cascella, and executed in collaboration with Polish and Italian artists Jerzy Jarnuszkiewicz, Julio Lafuente and Giorgio Simoncini. Completion of the monument took about nine years. It was dedicated on 16 April 1967. Trees were planted behind the monument by the people of Brzezinka.

== History ==
Selection of the design of the monument was made through an international competition, which was conducted in two phases. The first phase was organised by the International Auschwitz Committee with the participation of the International Union of Architects, and was announced on 2 June 1956. The British sculptor Henry Moore was chairman of the selection committee. A total of 465 design proposals were received, from almost 700 architects and artists from 36 countries. Among those who submitted designs were Carel Visser, Joseph Beuys and Max Lachnit.
