= Italo De Sanctis =

Italian painter

Italo De Sanctis (1881–1943) was an Italian painter, known for his portraits.

== Biography ==
He was born in Penne but his family moved to Teramo when he was an infant. In the early 1900, his father moved to Spoltore. In Spoltore, the young Italo met painter Francesco Paolo Michetti and the sculptor Costantino Barbella, friends of his father. Italo, like his father entered local politics between 1914 and 1920. However, defeated in 1920, he moved to Rome to study medicine, but became attracted to painting and took courses in the Roman Academy of Fine Arts. He traveled to Paris for two years. He returned to Spoltore where he was patronized as a portrait artist, as well as painting rural genre scenes.

He was visited by many artists he had befriended over the years, including Tommaso Cascella, Giuseppe D’Albenzio, Leopoldo Dell’Elce, Giuseppe Misticoni (one of his pupils), and Pasquale De Antonis.
