= Anna Maria Cesarini Sforza =

Italian artist (1921–2017)

Anna Maria Cesarini Sforza (1921 – March 2, 2017) was an Italian artist and mosaicist.

== Life & Education ==
Cesarini Sforza was born in Bologna in 1921. She attended the Accademia di Belle Arti in Rome in the 1940s alongside artists like Campigli, Afro, Capogrossi, Carrà, Consagra, de Chirico. She married the Italian sculptor Pietro Cascella in 1945 in Rome. Cascella and Cesarini Sforza had a son Tommaso Cascella, Jr. in Rome in 1951. Her grandson is Matteo Basilé (Rome, 1974), a contemporary artist and photographer. Cascella and Cesarini Sforza divorced, and Cascella remarried in 1966.

Cesarini Sforza died on March 2, 2017, at the age of 96.

== Work ==
Cesarini Sforza came from a long line of artists. After her studies in Rome and her marriage to Cascella, Cesarini Sforza began an intensive study of mosaics and collage. She also collaborated on projects with her husband and other artists at the time, including Cascella's brother Andrea. For example in 1949, Cascella and Cesarini created a large mosaic in the third-class waiting room at Rome's central station. The next year, 1950, they created the mosaic for the Cinema America in Rome. This work has more recently been in the news because Roman gentrification had endangered the work. Her work was included in the 1950-53 exhibition Italy at Work: Her Renaissance in Design Today that was co-organized by the Brooklyn Museum and the Art Institute of Chicago. In 1955-56, the two also created the ceiling of the Salone delle Riunioni at the ministry of foreign affairs in Rome.

Her work was exhibited in a 2006 group exhibition at the Galleria Cortese & Lisanti in Rome titled "Women of Art," alongside artists like Carla Accardi. In 2009, her work was exhibited in the Galleria Studio 10 in Veronan that was titled "Anna Maria Cesarini Sforza – Il mondo fantastico" or "Anna Maria Cesarini Sforza – The Fantastical World."

She had a number of important students come through her studio over the years to learn mosaics, including Marco Picchi (from 1987-90).
