= Sergio De Santis =

Italian writer

Sergio De Santis (born in 1953 in Naples, Italy) is an author known for his short stories.

== Career ==
De Santis is currently working for the newspaper La Repubblica.

Some of the De Santis' short stories have been published in magazines, such as Linea d’ombra and Nuovi Argomenti, and in the anthologies Decalogo, (Rizzoli) and Luna nuova (Argo).

In 2000, he published the book Malussìa, Storie del vulcano muto with the publishing group Avagliano editore.

In 2006, he was a finalist of the most important Italian literary prize, il Premio Strega, with the book Cronache dalla città dei crolli, "Nostalgia della ruggine" (Rust Nostalgia) (Naples Prize 2010), "L'opera viva" (The Living Work), and "Non sanno camminare sulla terra" (They Don't Know How to Walk on Earth).
