= Cesare De Sanctis =

Italian businessman

Cesare De Sanctis (died March 1881) was born in Rome. His date of birth is unknown. He was a businessman based in Naples and a close friend of Giuseppe Verdi; an extensive correspondence between the two has survived.

De Sanctis was also a friend of the librettist Salvatore Cammarano, who introduced him to Giuseppe Verdi in 1849. He served as an intermediary for Verdi and in his business dealings with Neapolitan theatres and other financial matters. Verdi was the godfather of his son from his first marriage, the painter Giuseppe De Sanctis. After De Sanctis's bankruptcy in the 1870s, when he was unable to repay Verdi an interest-free loan of 25,000 lire, the relationship soured.

By a second marriage, De Sanctis had another son, named Carlos.

The Verdi-De Sanctis correspondence of almost 250 letters was published by Alessandro Luzio in the first volume of Carteggi Verdiani and sheds interesting light on the genesis of the operas Un ballo in maschera, Don Carlos and Aida.
