= Vincent DeSantis =

Mayor of Gloversville, New York

Mayor of Gloversville
- In office January 2019 – January 2026
- Appointed by: Gloversville Common Council
- Preceded by: Dayton King
- Succeeded by: Gary Antonucci

Gloversville Common Council
- In office 2018–2019
- Preceded by: James Robinson
- Succeeded by: Steven Smith

Schenectady Common Council
- In office 2015–2017

Personal details
- Born: Vincent DeSantis; May 14, 1948 (age 78)
- Party: Democratic
- Education: C.W. Post College, St. John's University School of Law
- Profession: Politician, judge, attorney, author

Military service
- Branch/service: United States Army
- Years of service: 1971–1973

Vincent DeSantis (born May 14, 1948) is the former mayor of Gloversville, New York. He previously served respective terms as a councilman-at-large, a councilman, a city jurist from 1993 to 2012 and has worked as a career attorney. While registered as a Democrat, DeSantis is part of a once-bipartisan coalition dubbed the "Gloversville Party. He did not seek re-election in 2025.
