= Giuseppe Misticoni =

Italian painter and sculptor (1907–1998)

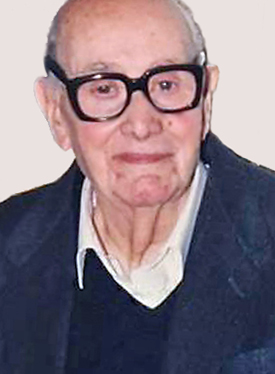

Giuseppe Misticoni (1907 - 1998) was an Italian painter and sculptor, active in the Abruzzo.

== Biography ==
Giuseppe Misticoni was born in Spoltore, to a family originally from Morro d’Oro, near Teramo. Giuseppe was initially mentored by the local painter Italo De Sanctis, and from there moved to study at the Liceo Artistico and then at the Accademia di Belle Arti di Roma.

During the war, he was sent to the Albanian front in 1940. He was made prisoner of the Greeks, but escaped and made his way back to the partisan resistance, only to return to Italy in 1946.

He moved back to Pescara, where in 1947 he founded the Liceo Artistico, which he directed for 30 years, and which still bears his name. Among his pupils and colleagues at the Liceo were his long-time friend, Giuseppe Di Prinzio; Nicola Febo; Elio Di Blasio; Franco Summa; Giovanni Melarangelo; Arduino Napoleone; Enio D’Incecco; and Giovanni Pittoni.

In the 1950s, Misticoni produced abstract works. He continued to exhibit at the Biennale di Venezia and the Quadriennale di Rome. His works are displayed in the Museo Costantino Barbella of Chieti, la Galleria d’Arte Moderna of Lucca, the Pinacoteca of L’Aquila, and other public and private galleries.
