= Jean-Toussaint Desanti =

French educator and philosopher

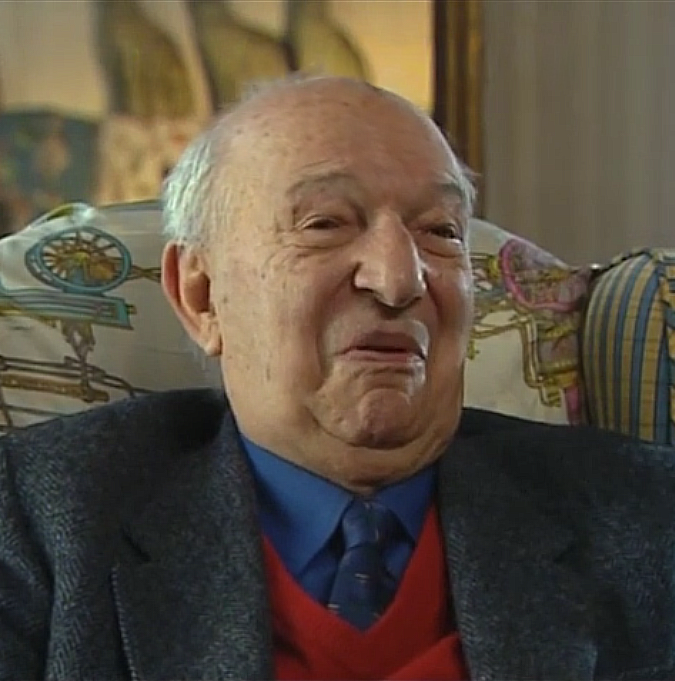
- Born: 8 October 1914; Ajaccio, Corsica, France
- Died: 20 January 2002 (aged 87); Paris, France
- Spouse: Dominique Desanti

Education
- Education: École Normale Supérieure
- Academic advisor: Jean Cavaillès

Philosophical work
- Era: 20th-century philosophy
- Region: Western philosophy
- School: Continental philosophy Western Marxism; Phenomenology; French epistemology
- Institutions: École Normale Supérieure; Lycée Lakanal; École normale supérieure de Saint-Cloud; University of Paris I
- Doctoral students: Jacques Derrida
- Notable students: Louis Althusser, Jean-Gérard Bursztein, Michel Foucault, Gérard Genette
- Main interests: Philosophy of mathematics Philosophy of science Epistemology
- Notable ideas: Mathematical idealities

Jean-Toussaint Desanti (French: [ʒɑ̃ tusɛ̃ dəzɑ̃ti]; 8 October 1914 – 20 January 2002) was a French educator and philosopher known for his work on both the philosophy of mathematics and phenomenology.

== Biography ==
The son of Jean-François Desanti and Marie-Paule Colonna, he was born in Ajaccio and studied the philosophy of mathematics with Jean Cavaillès at the École Normale Supérieure.

During World War II, he was a member of the French Resistance, associating with Jean-Paul Sartre and André Malraux. He joined the French Communist Party in 1943 with his wife Dominique, remaining a member until 1956.

In 1950, he participated in the publication of Science bourgeoise et science proletarienne with Raymond Guyot, Francis Cohen and Gérard Vassails. This book was part of a campaign by the French Communist Party to advocate support for Lysenkoism.

In 1956, he published Introduction à l'histoire de la philosophie (Introduction à l'histoire de la philosophie (Introduction to the History of Philosophy).

Desanti taught philosophy at the École Normale Supérieure, at the Lycée Lakanal, at the École normale supérieure de Saint-Cloud and at the University of Paris I. His students included Michel Foucault, Louis Althusser and Jean-Gérard Bursztein. He was also the doctoral advisor of Jacques Derrida.

In 1968, Desanti published Les Idéalités mathématiques, recherches épistémologiques sur le développement de la théorie des fonctions de variables réelles (Mathematical Idealities: Epistemological Studies on the Development of the Theory of Functions of Real Variables).

According to Étienne Balibar, Desanti's originality is to be found in his choice to set aside the traditional problems of the criteria or the status of mathematical truth, whether in their Platonic (characterized by the demarcation between the certitude proper to ideal objects and the incertitude of sensible objects) or transcendental (characterized by the definition of the a priori forms of consciousness) forms, in order to attend to another question, that of the "mediations" according to which a "naive" or elementary mathematical theory comes to open itself towards its own generalization and consequent re-foundation in more abstract terms.

Desanti died less than three weeks after undergoing coronary artery bypass surgery in early 2002 in Paris.

== Selected works ==
- Les Idéalités mathématiques. Recherches épistémologiques sur le développement de la théorie des fonctions de variables réelles (1968)
- Phénoménologie et praxis (1962)
- La Philosophie silencieuse ou Critique des philosophies de la science (1975)
- Réflexions sur le temps (1982)
- Philosophie, un rêve de flambeur, conversations avec Dominique-Antoine Grisoni (1999)
- La liberté nous aime encore (2001) with Dominique Desanti and Roger-Pol Droit
