= Tito Livio De Sanctis =

Italian physician (1817–1883)

- Born: 10 July 1817; San Martino sulla Marrucina, Italy
- Died: 8 February 1883 (aged 65); Naples, Italy
- Occupation: Physician

Tito Livio De Sanctis (10 July 1817 – 8 February 1883) was an Italian medical doctor.

== Biography ==
=== Early life ===
Tito Livio De Sanctis was born at San Martino sulla Marrucina, in a family of modest conditions, to Francesco Saverio and Colomba De Sanctis. He carried out his first studies in the college of Chieti showing the propensity for studying and maturing over time an excellent humanistic culture.

=== Doctor of medicine ===
His first experiences in the medical studies (Anatomy, Physiology, Surgery) were at l'Aquila. He graduated in Naples at University 'Federico II'.

=== MD career ===
He was appointed surgeon at the Ospedale dei Pellegrini and at Complesso degli Incurabili, important hospitals of Naples. In 1861, he became professor of surgical pathology at University 'Federico II'.

He wrote many scientific works. Among his most significant publications were: Corso generale di Patologia Chirurgica, a book adopted for years by the Neapolitan surgical school, and Ulceri e piaghe: saggio di clinica chirurgica, Chirurgia italiana e la Patologia Cellulare.
