= Federico Bernagozzi =

Italian painter

Federico Bernagozzi (19 July 1859 – 1 February 1916) was an Italian painter.

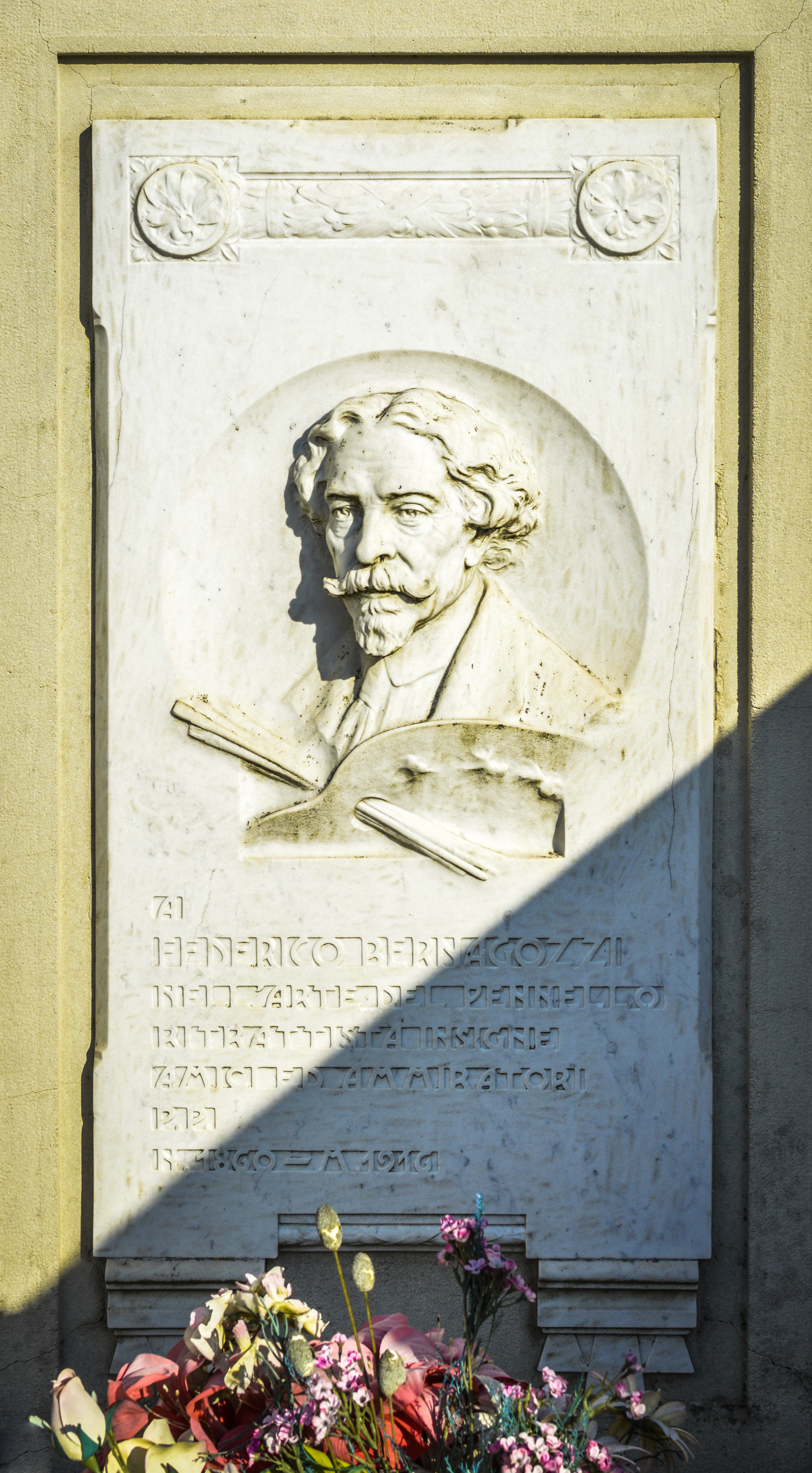
Tomb of Federico Bernagozzi in Ferrara

== Biography ==
He was born in Portomaggiore, province of Ferrara to a family of little means. Under the patronage of conti Aventi, he initially trained with Giuseppe Mazzolani and learned to paint portraits, taking the premier role that Giovanni Pagliarini had filled in that town until 1878.

He was sponsored by the Count to study at the Academy of Fine Arts of Florence, where he made contacts with the Macchiaioli movement. He then returned to Ferrara, where he continued to paint portraits. He also painted some landscapes. He was encouraged by others, including Giovanni Boldini to emigrate to other artistic centers. Yet he became more involved in Socialism and politics in Ferrara during the first decades of the century.
