= Dominique Desanti =

French journalist

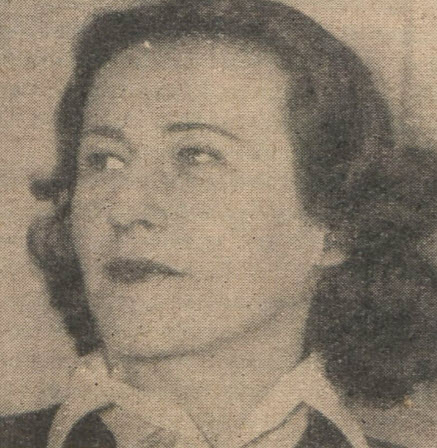
Dominique Desanti in September 1952.

Dominique Desanti (31 August 1919 – April 8, 2011) was a French journalist, novelist, educator and biographer.

The daughter of a Russian immigrant, she was born Dominique Persky in Paris. She served in the French Resistance during the German occupation. She was a member of the French Communist Party from 1943 until 1956. Desanti was a correspondent for L'Humanité in the years following World War II. She also taught university in the United States.

Desanti was married to the philosopher Jean-Toussaint Desanti; he died in 2002.

She died in Paris in 2011.

== Selected works ==
=== Biographies ===
- Flora Tristan : La Femme révoltée (1972)
- Drieu La Rochelle (1978)
- Sacha Guitry (1982) Prix Thérouanne from l'Académie française
- Sonia Delaunay (1988)
- Ce que le siècle m'a dit. Mémoires (1997), autobiography
- Robert Desnos: Le roman d'une vie (1999)
- La liberté nous aime encore (2001) with Jean-Toussaint Desanti
- La Sainte et l'Incroyante (2007)
- Sacha Guitry, itinéraire d'un joueur (2008) with Karin Müller
- Les Yeux d'Elsa au siècle d'Aragon (2010) with Karin Müller

=== History ===
- La colombe vole sans visa (1951)
- Les Socialistes de l’Utopie (1971) Prix Thérouanne from l'Académie française
- Les Staliniens (1975)

=== Novels ===
- Un métier de chien (1971)
- Les Années passion (1992)
