= Pietro Cascella =

Italian sculptor (1921–2008)

- Born: February 2, 1921; Pescara, Italy
- Died: May 18, 2008 (aged 87); Pietrasanta
- Known for: sculpture; mosaic
- Spouses: Anna Maria Cesarini Sforza; Cordelia von den Steinen

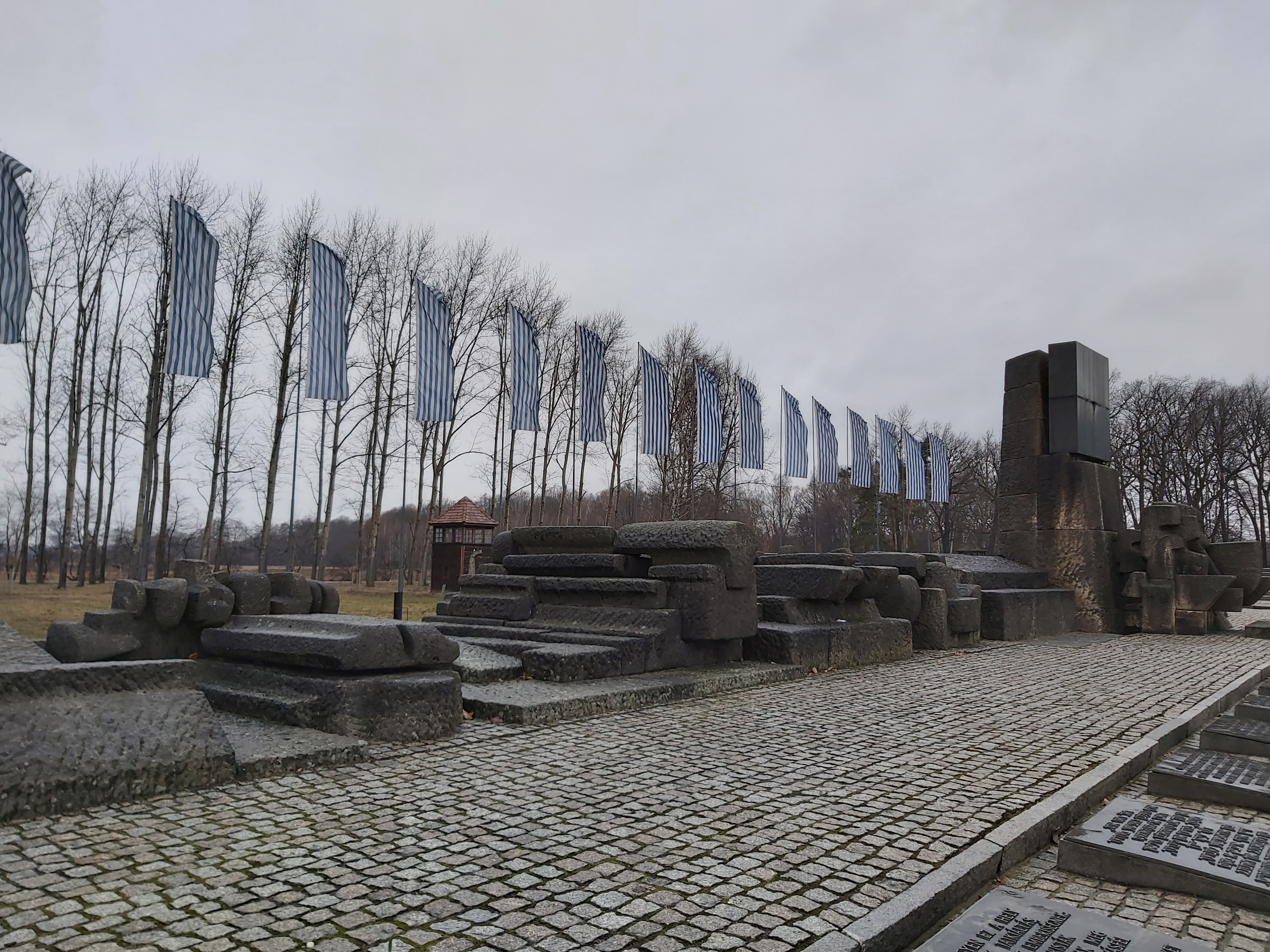
The International Monument to the Victims of Fascism, 1967, Auschwitz II–Birkenau, Poland

Pietro Cascella (February 2, 1921 – May 18, 2008) was an Italian sculptor. His principal work consisted of large monumental sculptures, including the International Monument to the Victims of Fascism in the Auschwitz II-Birkenau death camp in Poland (1957–1967), and an underground mausoleum for Silvio Berlusconi at his villa in Arcore in the 1980s.

== Life ==
Cascella was born into a family of artists in Pescara on February 2, 1921. His father was Tommaso Cascella, a painter and ceramicist, and his mother was Susanna Federman. His elder brother Andrea Cascella was a sculptor. Two of his uncles were also artists, the painter Michele Cascella and painter and ceramicist Gioacchino Cascella, as was his grandfather, the painter, ceramicist, and lithographer Basilio Cascella. In 1945 he married Anna Maria Cesarini Sforza, an artist. From 1977 he lived with his second wife, Cordelia von den Steinen, in the mediaeval Castello della Verrucola in the comune of Fivizzano, above Carrara. He died in Pietrasanta in 2008.

== Work ==
In the late 1930s he moved to Rome and studied at the Accademia di Belle Arti under Ferruccio Ferrazzi, who taught both painting and sculpture. He had work in the Quadriennale di Roma painting exhibition of 1943, and in the twenty-fourth Biennale di Venezia in 1948. He also participated in the twenty-eighth Biennale in 1956.

In the years after the Second World War Cascella, with his brother Andrea and various friends, worked in ceramics and mosaic in a brick-works in the Valle dell'Inferno, the brick-making district of Rome. In about 1949 he and his wife Cesarini Sforza were commissioned to create mosaics for the third-class waiting-room of the Stazione Termini, the principal railway station of Rome. In 1950, the two completed a large mosaic for a Roman cinema, the Cinema America. At about this time he also made small-scale reliefs in various materials, some of them drawing inspiration from the work of Roberto Matta, who was a friend.

In 1950–1953 some ceramic work was included in the large American exhibition Italy at Work: Her Renaissance in Design Today.

In 1962 his work was included in an exhibition of ceramics at the Galleria dell’Obelisco in Rome. He had a solo show at the Galleria del Milione in Milan in the same year, and another at the Galería Bonino in New York. In the following year, and again in 1972, he had a room at the Biennale. In 1968 his work was shown at the Galèrie du Dragon in Paris and at the Musée d'Ixelles in Brussels. In 1971 Cascella participated in the twenty-third Salon de la Jeune Sculpture in Paris.

In April 2006 he received the Italian Medal of Merit for Culture and Art.

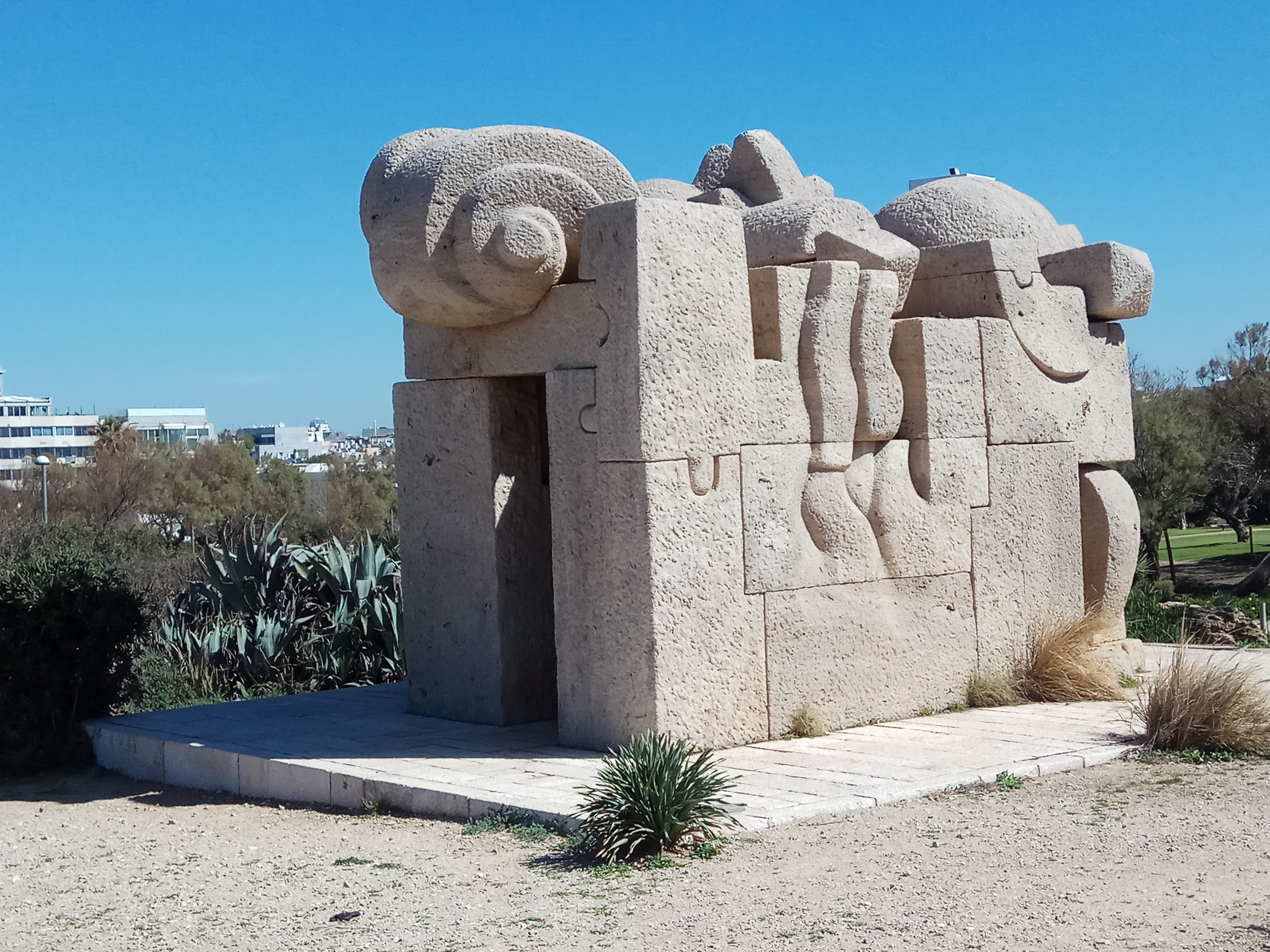
Gateway of Peace, 1972, Tel Aviv, Israel

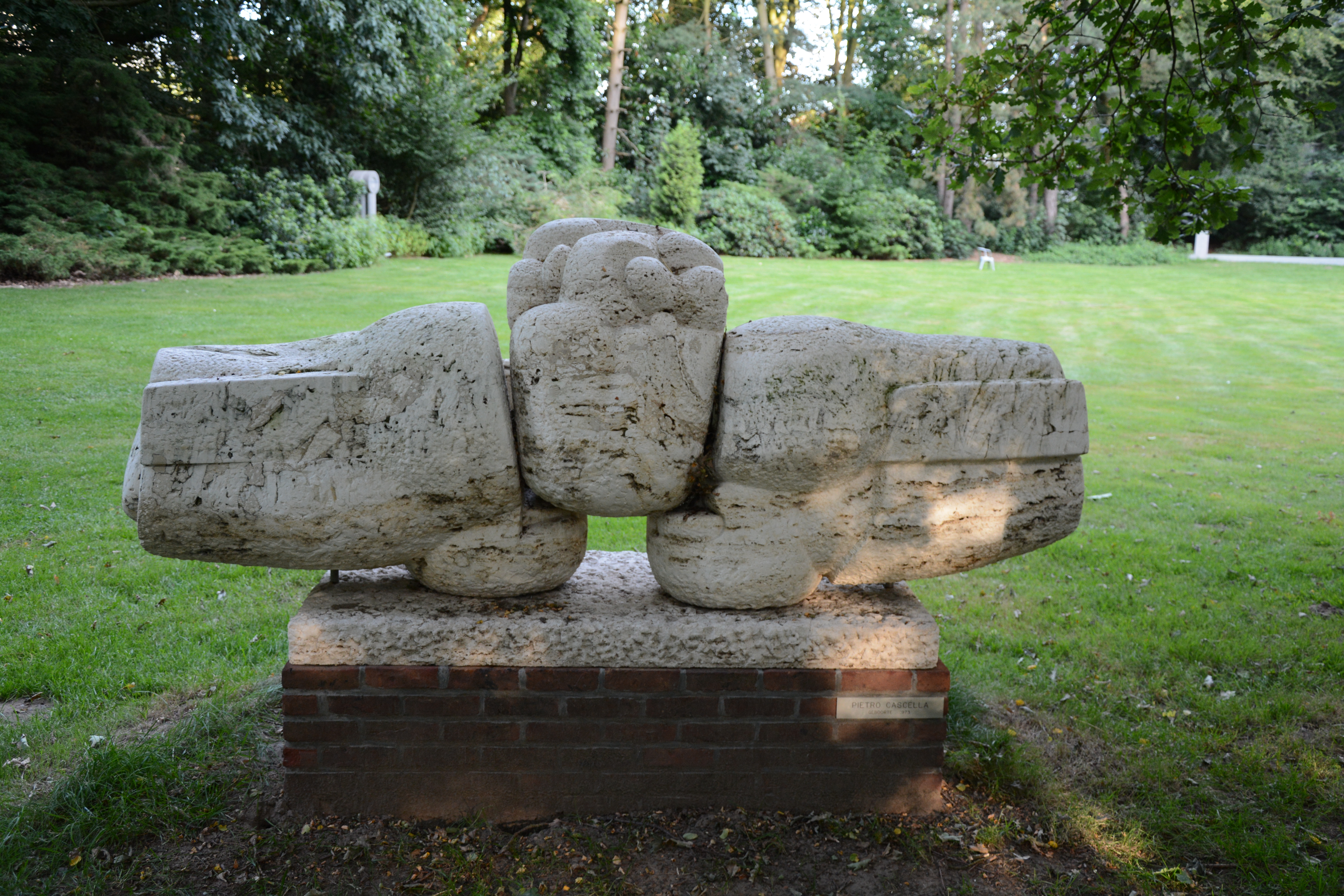
Nascita, 1973, Middelheim Open Air Sculpture Museum, Antwerp

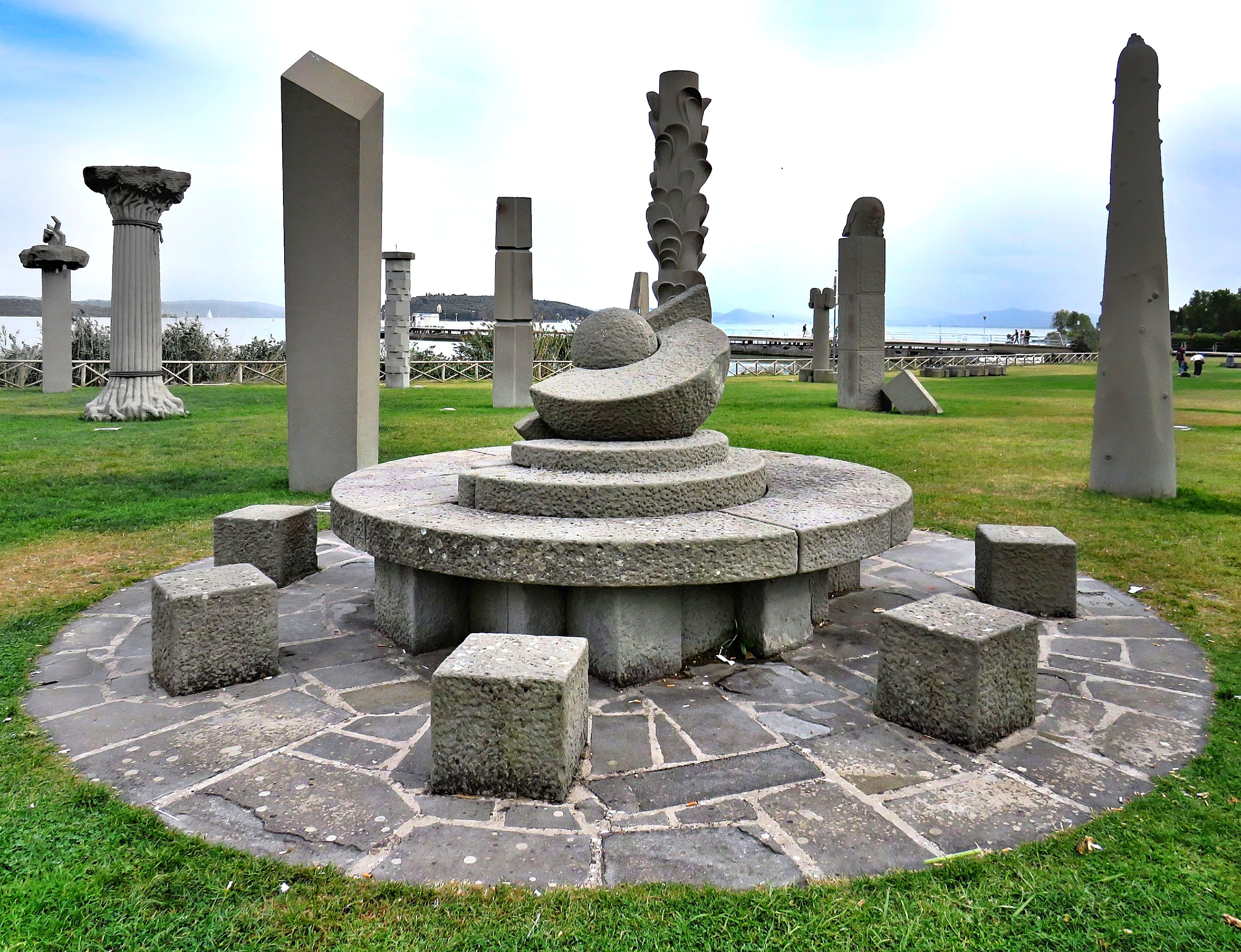
Campo del Sole, various artists, 1985–1989, central sculpture; Tuoro sul Trasimeno, Umbria

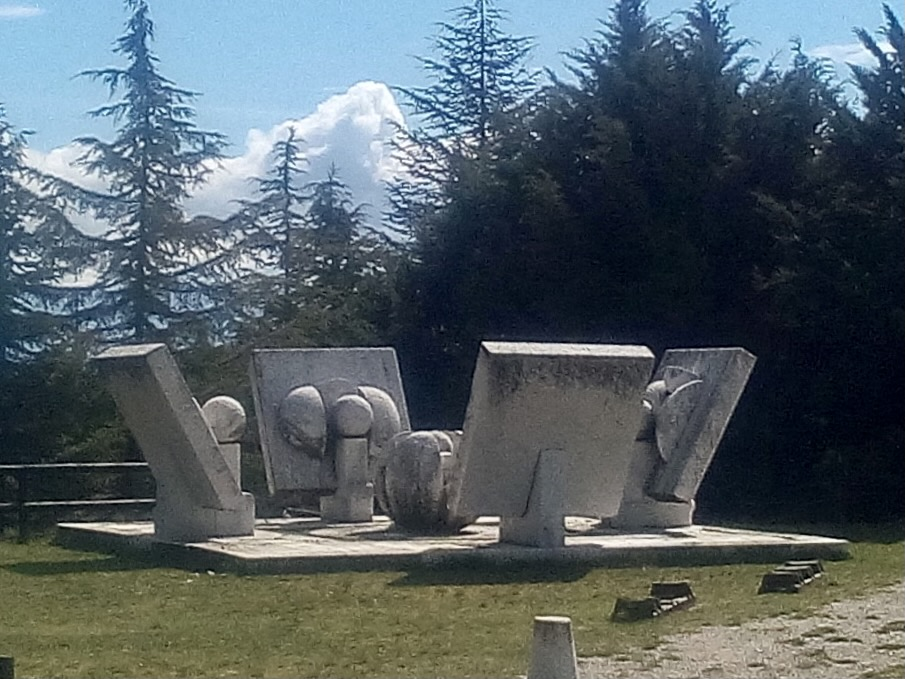
Il Teatro della Germinazione, Monte Salviano, Abruzzo
