= Giuseppe De Sanctis =

Italian painter

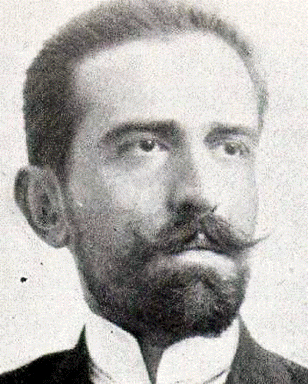
Giuseppe De Sanctis (late 1880s-early 90s)

Giuseppe De Sanctis (21 June 1858 – 18 June 1924) was an Italian painter, primarily of portraits and cityscapes.

== Biography ==
He was born in Naples. His father, Cesare, was a businessman who loved music, art and the theater. He was, in fact, a close friend of Verdi, who attended Giuseppe's baptism. As a result, contrary to the experience of many other aspiring artists, his family encouraged his desire to become a painter. In 1872, he was enrolled at the Accademia di Belle Arti, where he studied with Domenico Morelli, Filippo Palizzi and Gioacchino Toma.

After graduating, he went abroad, painting in London and Paris where, thanks to a recommendation by Morelli, he worked for Goupil & Cie and created a series of female portraits (many done with the same model) that have become his best-known works. He also continued his studies, with Jean-Léon Gérôme, and was influenced by his contemporary, Pascal Dagnan-Bouveret.

He was a regular participant in exhibitions in Naples from 1882 to 1917 and participated in the Salons of 1890 and 1899. His painting "La preghiera della sera a Bisanzio" (Evening prayer at Byzantium) which won a silver medal in Palermo, was purchased in 1886 by King Umberto I.

In 1890, he was involved in the creation of the "Circolo artistico di Napoli". That same year, he was one of the artists chosen to decorate the famous Caffè Gambrinus. After 1895, he became associated with the Venice Biennale and worked on their planning committees in 1903 and 1905. In 1901, he replaced his old mentor, Morelli, at the Accademia di Belle Arti, where he was later named a professor of etching and engraving. During his later years, he painted mostly French subjects, although he also did a series of portraits of the Royal Family. He died in Naples in 1924.

== Selected paintings ==
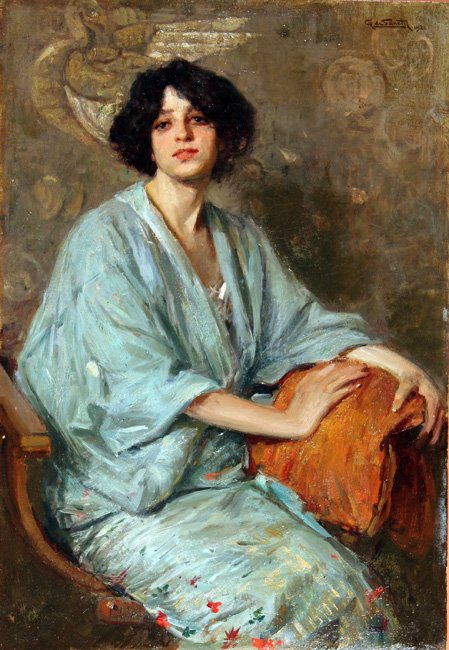
Interior Scene
with Figure

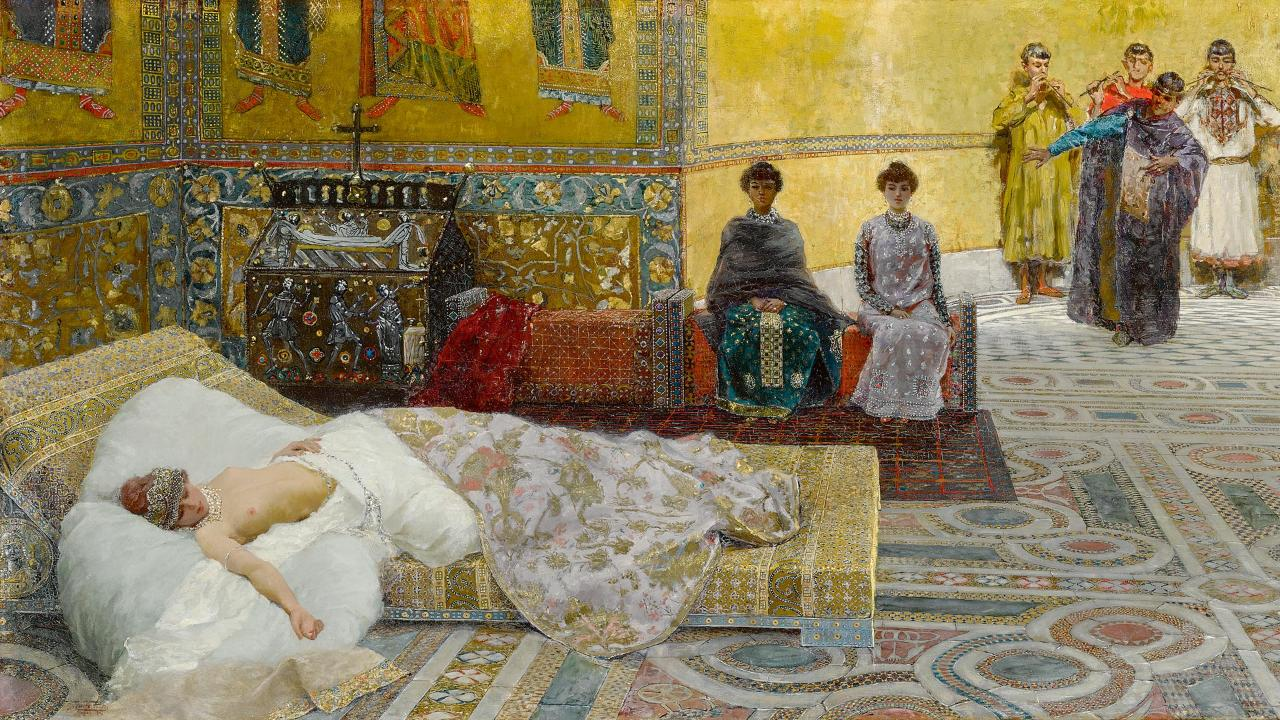
Empress Theodora

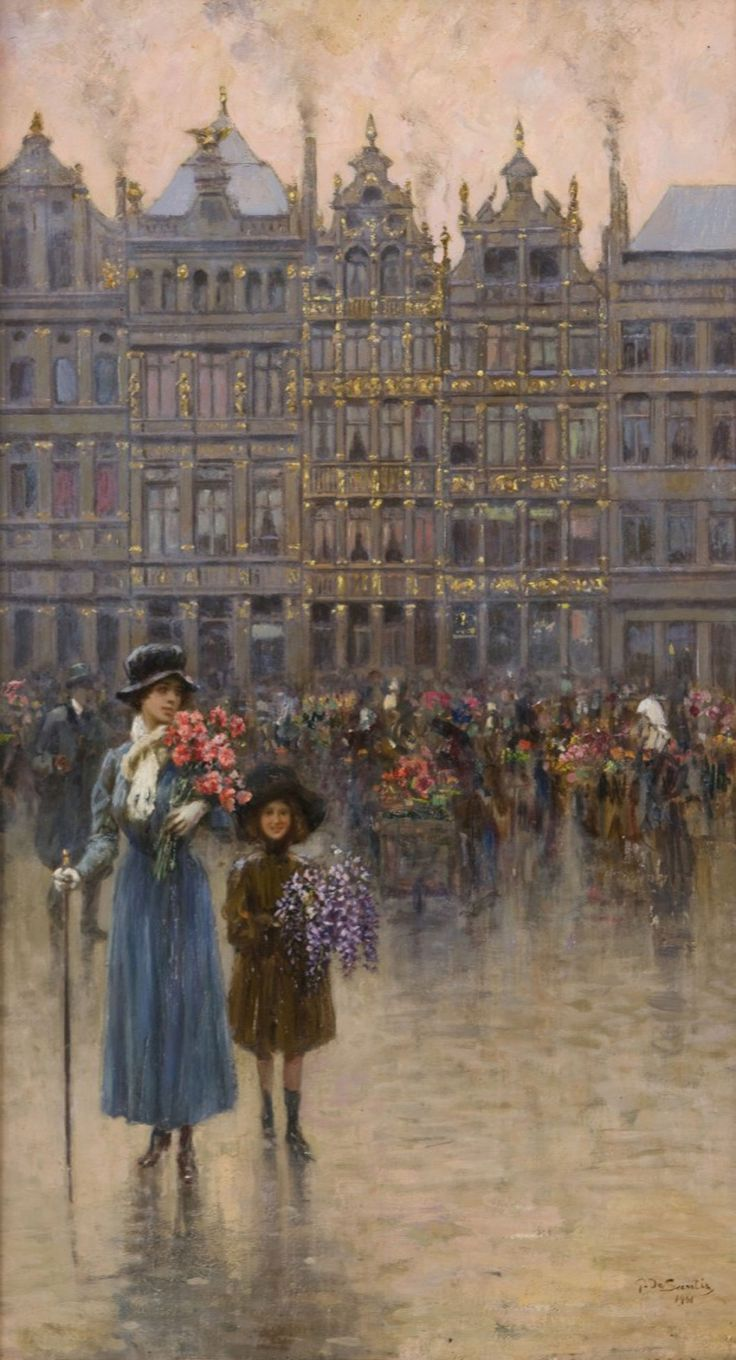
Flower Market
in Brussels

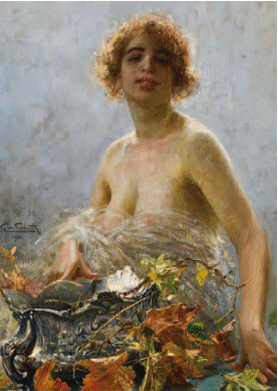
Spring and Autumn

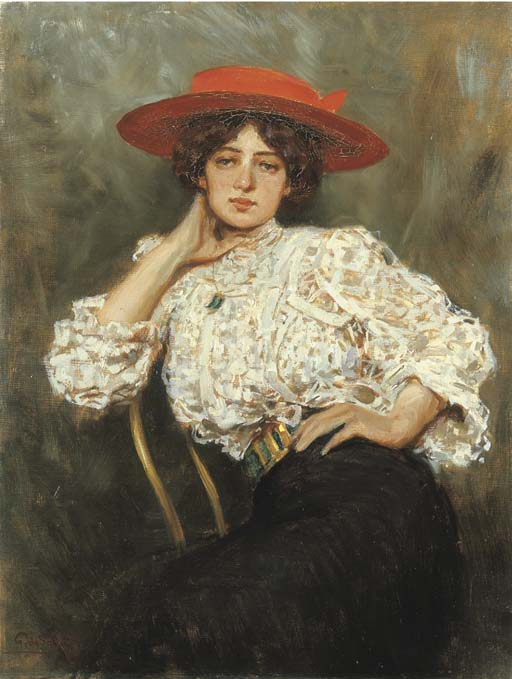
The Red Bonnet
