= Michele Cascella =

Italian painter

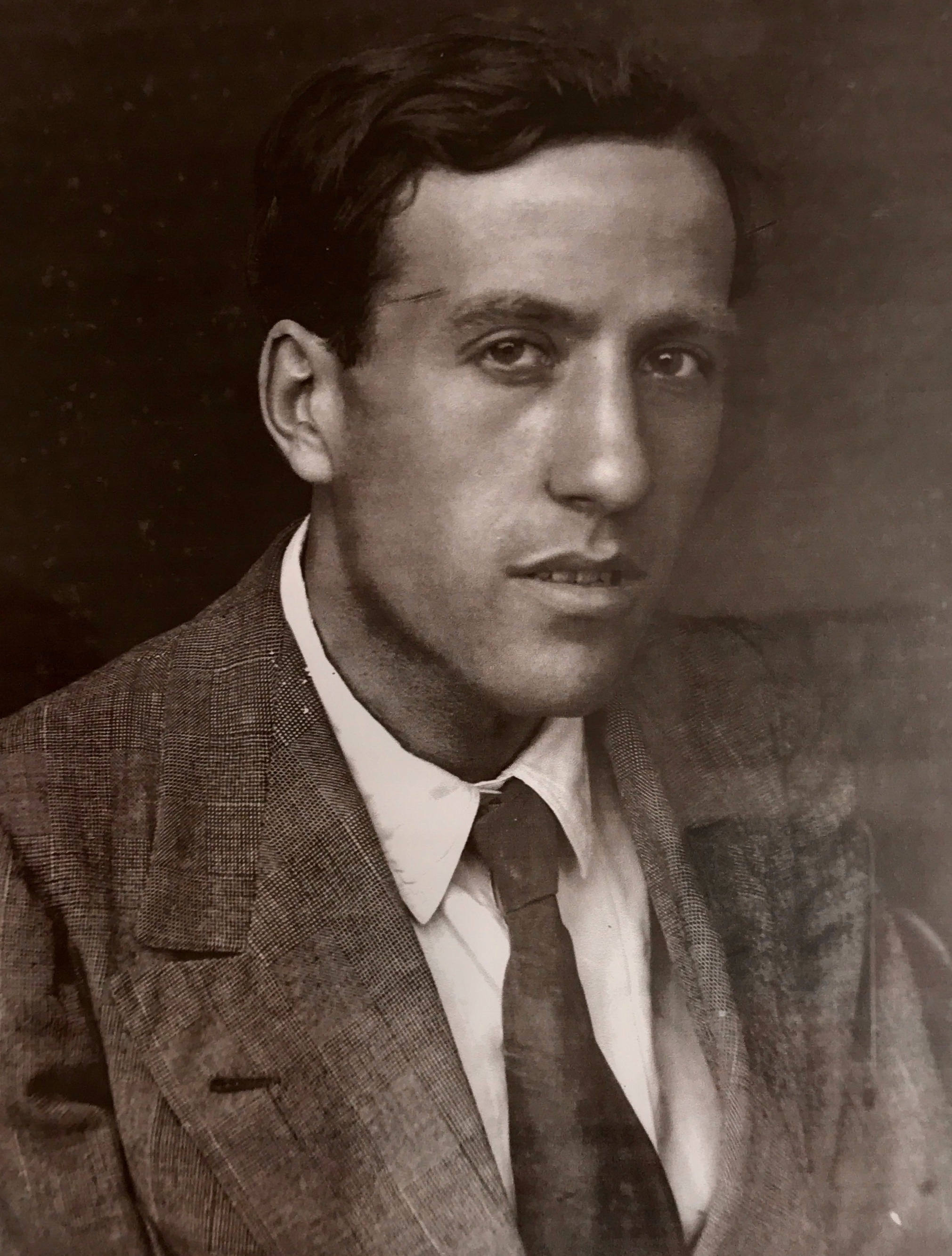
- Born: 7 September 1892
- Died: 31 August 1989 (aged 96)
- Occupation: Artist

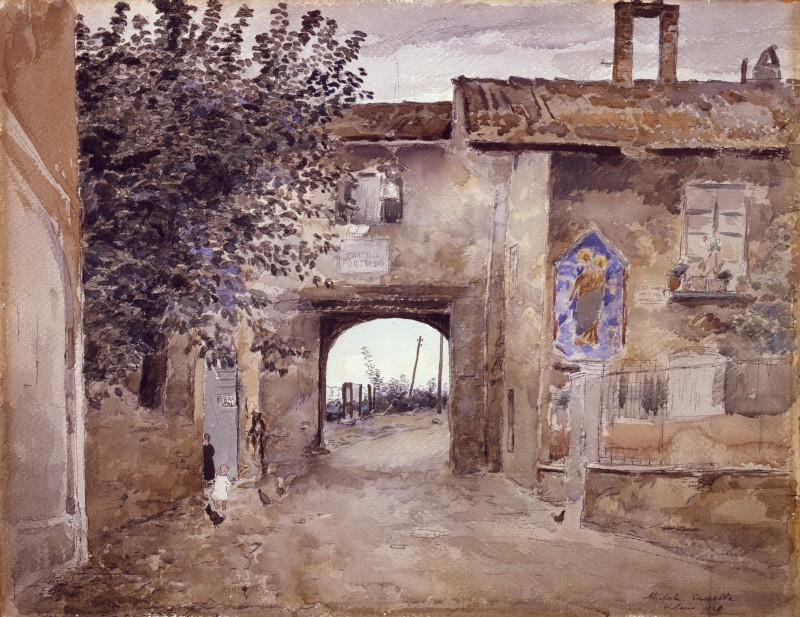
L'ingresso al Portello (1928) Art collections of Fondazione Cariplo

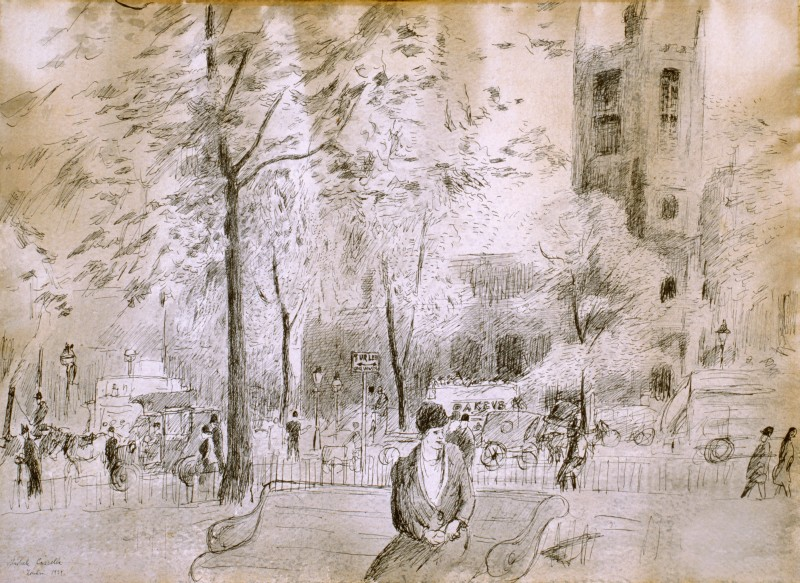
London (1929) Art collections of Fondazione Cariplo

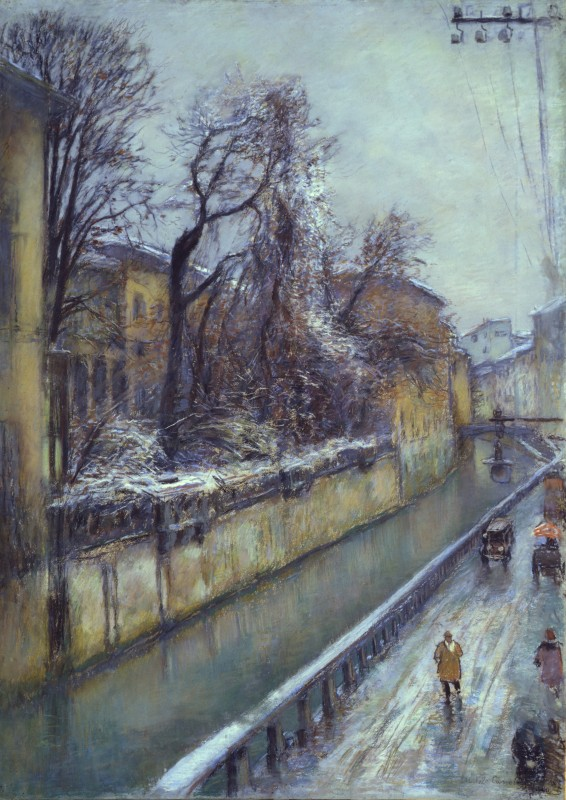
Along the Canal (1929) (Fondazione Cariplo)

Michele Cascella (7 September 1892 – 31 August 1989) was an Italian artist. Primarily known for his oil paintings and watercolours, he also worked in ceramics, lithography, and textiles. He exhibited regularly at the Venice Biennale from 1924 until 1942, and his works are owned by major museums in Italy and Europe, including Victoria and Albert Museum in London, Galerie nationale du Jeu de Paume in Paris, and Galleria Nazionale d'Arte Moderna in Rome.

== Biography ==
=== Family and early years ===
He was born in Ortona a Mare. His father, Basilio Cascella, who was a painter, engraver, ceramist, lithographer and illustrator, was his first and most influential teacher. Before Michele was born, he lived and worked in Naples, Milan, Turin, Venice, London and Palermo. In 1895, Basilio moved the family from Ortona to Pescara. The Pescara city council gave Basilio a piece of land to build a chromolithographic laboratory and art studio. This building today is the site of the Museo Civico "Basilio Cascella". It holds more than 500 works belonging to three generations of the Cascella family. Most of the works are Basilio's, the others are of his sons Tommaso, Michele, and Gioacchino and of the sons of Tommaso, Andrea and Pietro, who became well known sculptors. In 1899, Basilio began publishing the magazine L'illustrazione abruzzese, then L'illustrazione meridionale and finally La Grande Illustrazione. Among the collaborators to these publications were some of the most important literary figures of the times, such as Gabriele d'Annunzio, Luigi Pirandello, Umberto Saba, Gennaro Finamore, Filippo Tommaso Marinetti, Sibilla Aleramo, Matilde Serao, Grazia Deledda, Ada Negri, Guido Gozzano and Giovanni Pascoli.

Michele Cascella left school early, owing to bad results, and began to work in his father's chromolithographic laboratory in Pescara. He was involved in the various lithographic processes of transfers and proofs. Meanwhile, Basilio had Michele copy the drawings of the masters (Leonardo, Pisanello, Botticelli, and Donatello) or details of mouths and noses which the father prepared specifically for Michele to practice over and over again. Soon Basilio would send Michele and Tommaso alone, at dawn, to the shores of the Pescara River and the surrounding hills or to the Majella to study the scenery from close by and interpret the language of nature.

When Basilio felt his sons were ready to show their work, he shifted his role from shop master to organizer and promoter of their art. Michele had now been out of school and working for his father for almost five years. Their first show was held in 1907 in Milan, far from their provincial background. There was talk of enfants prodiges. Michele was only 15 years old.

=== Career ===
Michele Cascella sold his first painting privately in 1908 and had his first exhibition in Paris the following year. His technique mainly consisted in the use of pastels. Since 1910, he frequented the cultural circles of Milan, where he became friends with Clemente Rebora, Antonio Banfi, and the writer Sibilla Aleramo, who in her turn introduced him to Filippo Tommaso Marinetti, Umberto Boccioni and Margherita Sarfatti. Giorgio de Chirico also became a friend of his.

In 1915 at the start of the World War I Italian Campaign, Cascella was sent to the front in the Trentino, but he did not stop painting. In fact, General Enrico Caviglia, his commander, gave him the job of drawing the life of the soldiers at the front. Some of these scenes of military life are today preserved in the Museum of the Risorgimento in Milan.

In 1919 Michele Cascella moved to Milan where he shared an apartment with his friend and inspiration, the poet Clemente Rebora. He dedicated himself to engraving and ceramics, later returning to oil and watercolor painting. In 1924 Carlo Carrà, who was a great supporter of the primitivism in Cascella's paintings, gave him good reviews. That same year, three watercolors were exhibited at the Venice Biennale for the first time and one of them, Mattutino, was bought by King Vittorio Emanuele III. Since then, the artist participated in almost all the Venice Biennale exhibitions until 1942. In 1928 he made his first trip to Paris, though he had held several exhibits there already, and he exhibited in Brussels. From then on, Cascella considered Paris his second home. Life there reminded him of certain areas of Italy.

From 1931 until 1951 Cascella participated in the Rome Quadriennales. In April 1931 he exhibited 28 paintings at the Bastford Gallery in London, where he met the architect Alfred C. Bossom who bought three paintings. He then donated the watercolor The entrance to the village to the Victoria and Albert Museum. That same year he exhibited at the Toison d'Or Gallery in Brussels; in June, the Belgian Minister of The Sciences and Arts stated that it had acquired his painting Evening at Montecatini.

In 1933 the director of Corriere della Sera, Aldo Borelli, invited Cascella to collaborate with a series of sketches of important Italian places. Almost every day, the paper published one of his drawings. On June 4, 1933, he was able to paint the canonization ceremony of Andrew Fournet in St. Peter's Basilica. Though the artist initially thought this painting was a flop, Antonio Maraini (Dacia Maraini's grandfather), then secretary of the Venice Biennale, displayed it there the following year. The Italian King wanted to buy it, but he offered only half the price asked by Cascella. The painter proudly refused; later he could not find another buyer. In 1934 Cascella went to Libya for a few months and shortly after he received a commission from Maria-José, Princess of Piedmont for a series of paintings dedicated to southern Italian landscapes. She gave him itinerary tips from Amalfi to Sila.

In 1937 Cascella was invited to make the wall decoration for the new Maritime station of Messina. He agreed only to prepare the sketch and left to his father and brother Tommaso the actual execution. He also won the gold medal at the Universal Exposition in Paris. At the cultural institution "La Permanente" in Milan Cascella exhibited Roma, sport esultanza, inspired by the 1933 Primo Carnera – Paulino Uzcudun boxing match held in Rome's Piazza di Spagna in the presence of Benito Mussolini. In 1938 he designed the scenes for the premiere of Licinio Refice's opera Margherita da Cortona, at La Scala. He then began to reside in Portofino which became the inspiration for many of his later works.

In 1942 Cascella had a room at the Biennale of Venice, and he exhibited works made at the request of the Ministers of the Navy and the Air Force.

In October 1959 he made his first trip to the U.S., to New York City. From then on he would spend six months every year in Palo Alto, California, where Isabel Lane became his agent and organized all his shows. Later Cascella was represented by the Juarez Gallery in Los Angeles.

In 1965, while in Ortona, the artist dedicated a painting to Thomas the Apostle, which was donated to the Pontiff Paolo VI.

From 1969 he spent much of his time in the countryside of Colle di Val d'Elsa (province of Siena) with his second wife, Isabel Lane Cascella. He painted many Tuscan landscapes during this period.

The artist died at the age of 96 in Milan and was buried in Ortona. In 2003 he was featured in the collective exhibition "De Chirico et la peinture italienne de l'entre-deux guerres" (De Chirico and Italian Painting of the Interwar Period) at the Museum of Lodève.

== Style and legacy ==
Michele Cascella was a very congenial and humane person, as well as a tenacious worker. The techniques he used were pastels, pencil and pen and ink drawings, oils, watercolors, ceramics, lithography and textiles. His most frequent subjects were the landscapes of Abruzzi, locations all over Italy, Portofino, Paris, London, New York, California, Mexico, Hawaii, Tuscany; he also painted flowers, portraits and still life. Cascella himself said that Henri Rousseau and Picasso had the greatest impact on the art world, while Van Gogh, Utrillo and Raoul Dufy most influenced his own work. He is referred to as an Italian Impressionist, Post-Impressionist and neo-impressionist. Also primitivism and crepuscular landscape art are used to describe his work. Michele Cascella won the gold medal at the Paris Exposition Universelle in 1937. In 1972 and again in 1980 the Comune of Milan gave him a gold medal of merit. In 1975 Michele became an honorary citizen of Portofino. In 1977 the city of Ortona dedicated to him the Pinacoteca Comunale. In 1979, the Academy of Art Dino Scalabrino of Montecatini Terme gave Cascella the Life of artist 1979 prize.

== Museum collections ==
These museums hold Cascella's work.

=== Belgium ===
- Musée Modern Museum, Brussels

=== France ===
- Galerie nationale du Jeu de Paume, Paris

=== Italy ===
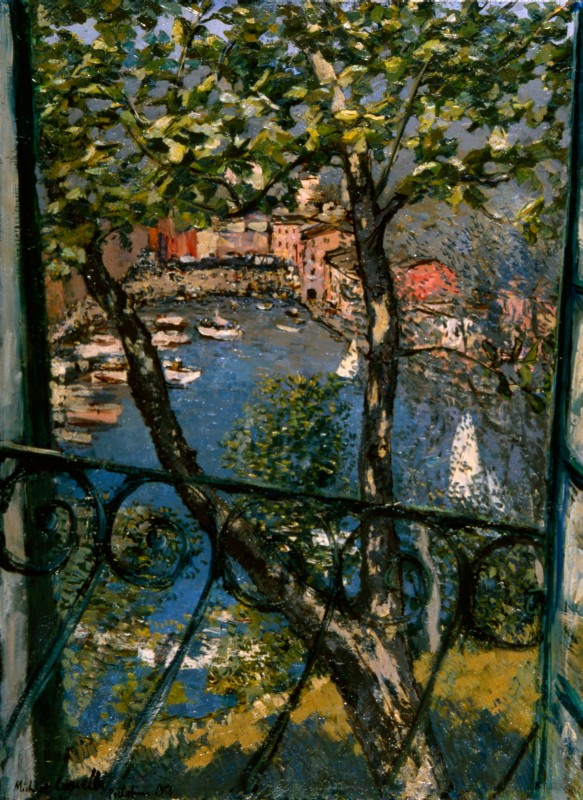
Portofino, (1956) Art collections of Fondazione Cariplo

==== Abruzzo ====
- Basilio Cascella Civic Museum, Pescara
- Museo casa natale Gabriele D'Annunzio, Pescara
- Museo civico d'arte contemporanea - Pinacoteca Cascella, Ortona
- Museo Nazionale d'Abruzzo, L'Aquila

==== Campania ====
- Museo d'arte – MdAO, Avellino

==== Emilia Romagna ====
- Galleria d'arte moderna Ricci Oddi, Piacenza

==== Lazio ====
- Banca Nazionale del Lavoro, Rome
- Galleria Nazionale d'Arte Moderna, Rome

==== Liguria ====
- Palazzo Gavotti, Savona

==== Lombardy ====
- Art collections of Fondazione Cariplo, Milan
- Museo del risorgimento, Milan

==== Piedmont ====
- Galleria civica d'arte moderna e contemporanea, Turin
- Museo Novarese di Arte, Novara

==== Veneto ====
- Museo d'arte moderna Rimoldi, Cortina d'Ampezzo

=== Luxembourg ===
- National Museum of History and Art, Luxembourg

=== United Kingdom ===
- Victoria and Albert Museum, London

=== United States ===
- De Saisset Museum, Santa Clara University, California

== Sources ==
- Antonella Crippa, Michele Cascella, catalogo online Artgate della Fondazione Cariplo, 2010, CC-BY-SA.
- Paolo Levi, Cascella. Dolomia Editrice d'Arte, Trento 1998, pp. 80 (testo bilingue italiano francese).
- Giuseppe Rosato, Michele Cascella opera grafica. Disegni, pastelli, acquarelli e litografie dal 1907 al 1978. Introduzione di Paolo LEVI. Edizioni Grahis Arte, Livorno 1978, pp. 33 + 80 tavole.
- Forza zio Mec, Michele Cascella, 1969
- Taccuino di un pittore, Michele Cascella, 1975
- Michele Cascella... On Art, Architectural Digest, Spring 1970 pg. 62-67
- Michele Cascella La gioia di vivere, Vittorio Sgarbi, 2008
- Michele Cascella on ArtInvest2000
- Pinacoteca Comunale Michele Cascella, Ortona
- Museo Civico Basilio Cascella, Pescara
