= Tommaso Cascella =

Italian painter and ceramist (1890–1968)

Tommaso Cascella senior (1890–1968) was an Italian painter, known for brightly colored landscapes.

== Biography ==
He was born in Ortona in the Abruzzo. He trained in the Liceo Artistico of Giuseppe Misticoni. His father Basilio and his younger siblings Michele (1907–1941) and Gioacchino were all painters. Tommaso traveled to Paris in 1909. Their house in Pescara is now the Museo Basilio Cascella.
