= List of city museums =

A city museum is usually a public museum serving a specific city or region, and dedicated to displaying and preserving culturally or scientifically significant objects.

Museums containing "City Museum" in their names include but not limited to:

== Asia ==
- City Hall Museum, Hong Kong, China
- City Museum, Gorkhatri, Peshawar, Pakistan
- City Museum, Hyderabad, India
- Dhaka City Museum, Bangladesh
- Eilat City Museum, Israel
- Fukuoka City Museum, Japan
- Ginowan City Museum, Japan
- Hachinohe City Museum, Japan
- Haifa City Museum, Israel
- Hakodate City Museum, Japan
- Hirosaki City Museum, Japan
- Ho Chi Minh City Museum of Fine Arts, Vietnam
- Iida City Museum, Japan
- Ishinomaki City Museum, Japan
- Kobe City Museum, Japan
- Kushiro City Museum, Japan
- Mikasa City Museum, Japan
- Miyakojima City Museum, Japan
- Miyakojima City Museum, Japan
- Nagoya City Museum, Japan
- Nanjing City Wall Museum, China
- Osaka City Museum, Japan
- Pasig City Museum, Philippines
- Sakai City Museum, Japan
- Sendai City Museum, Japan
- Tire City Museum, Turkey
- Tomakomai City Museum, Japan
- Toyota City Museum, Japan
- Tōkamachi City Museum, Japan
- Ulaanbaatar City Museum, Mongolia
- Wakayama City Museum, Japan

== Europe ==
- Athens City Museum, Greece
- Belgrade City Museum, Serbia
- Bergen City Museum, Norway
- Bratislava City Museum, Slovakia
- Brussels City Museum, Belgium
- City Museum and Ceramics Gallery (Ariano Irpino), Italy
- City Museum of Ljubljana, Slovenia
- City Museum of Novi Sad, Serbia
- Dresden City Museum, Germany
- Ghent City Museum, Belgium
- Helsingør City Museum, Denmark
- Helsinki City Museum, Finland
- Königsberg City Museum, Germany
- Lahr City Museum, Germany
- Lancaster City Museum, United Kingdom
- Leeds City Museum, United Kingdom
- Museum of the City of Skopje, North Macedonia
- Oslo City Museum, Norway
- Portsmouth City Museum, United Kingdom
- Schleswig City Museum, Germany
- SeaCity Museum, United Kingdom
- Sombor City Museum, Serbia
- Stockholm City Museum, Sweden
- Tallinn City Museum, Tallinn, Estonia
- Tartu City Museum, Estonia
- Weimar City Museum, Germany
- Worms City Museum, Worms, Germany
- Zagreb City Museum, Croatia

== North America ==
- City Museum (St. Louis, Missouri), United States
- City of Raleigh Museum, North Carolina, United States
- Jersey City Museum, New Jersey, United States
- Lost City Museum, Overton, Nevada, United States
- Mill City Museum, Minneapolis, Minnesota, United States
- Museum of the City of Merida, Yucatán, Mexico
- Museum of the City of New York, New York, United States
- Oklahoma City Museum of Art, Oklahoma, United States
- Museum of Toronto, Toronto, Canada

== South America ==
- City Museum (Quito, Ecuador)

== See also ==
- Museum
- Local museums that cover the history of a city
