= Museo Civico =

Museo Civico (transl. Civic Museum) may refer to:

== Abruzzo ==
- Museo civico aufidenate Antonio De Nino, Alfedena
- Museo civico aufidenate, Castel di Sangro
- Museo civico di Cerchio
- Museo civico archeologico Antonio De Nino, Corfinio
- Basilio Cascella Civic Museum, Pescara
- Museo Civico di Teramo

== Campania ==
- Museo Civico di Castel Nuovo, Naples
- Museo Civico Filangieri, Naples
- Museo Civico Raffaele Marocco, Piedimonte Matese

== Emilia-Romagna ==
- Civico Museo Bibliografico Musicale (now the Museo internazionale e biblioteca della musica), Bologna
- Museo Civico Archeologico di Bologna
- Giardino Botanico del Museo Civico di Scienze Naturali di Faenza
- Musei Civici di Arte Antica e Museo Riminaldi, Ferrara
- Civic museums of Forlì
- Civic Museum of Mirandola

== Friuli-Venezia Giulia ==
- Museo Civico di Storia Naturale di Trieste
- Museo Civico Revoltella, Trieste

== Lazio ==
- Museo Civico di Rieti
- Museo Civico di Zoologia, Rome

== Liguria ==
- Museo Civico di Storia Naturale di Genova
- Museo civico Amedeo Lia, La Spezia

== Lombardy ==
- Museo Civico Archeologico di Arsago Seprio
- Museo Civico Scienze Naturali Enrico Caffi, Bergamo
- Civic Museum of Fossils of Besano
- Civic Museum of Crema
- Museo Civico Ala Ponzone, Cremona
- Museo Civico di Storia Naturale di Milano
- Museo Civico, Pavia

== Marche ==
- Musei Civici di Palazzo Pianetti, Jesi
- Civic Museum and Pinacoteca, Mondavio
- Civic Museum of Palazzo Mosca, Pesaro
- Museo civico Villa Colloredo Mels, Recanati

== Piedmont ==
- Federico Eusebio Civic Museum of Archaeology and Natural Sciences, Alba
- Museo Civico Casa Cavassa, Saluzzo
- Museo Civico d'Arte Antica, Turin

== Sicily ==
- Museo civico al Castello Ursino, Catania
- Museo Civico Belliniano, Catania

== Tuscany ==
- Museo Civico di Montepulciano
- Museo Civico d'Arte Antica, housed in the Palazzo degli Anziani, Pistoia
- Museo Civico di Sansepolcro
- Museo Civico, Siena

== Trentino-Alto Adige ==
- Palais Mamming, the Museo Civico di Merano

== Veneto ==
- Museo Civico di Bassano
- Musei Civici di Padova
- Fondazione Musei Civici di Venezia
- Castelvecchio Museum
- Museo Civico, housed in the Palazzo Chiericati, Vicenza

== See also ==
- Guelph Civic Museum, Guelph, Ontario, Canada
- City Museum (disambiguation)
