= Ileana Mulet Batista =

- Born: 27 June 1952 (age 74); Holguín, Cuba
- Education: Academia Nacional de Bellas Artes San Alejandro
- Occupations: Visual artist, painter, designer, writer
- Known for: Urban landscape painting and poetry

Ileana Mulet Batista (born 27 June 1952, Holguín, Cuba) is a Cuban visual artist, painter, draftsman, designer, and writer. Her work includes painting, design, and poetry and frequently explores urban landscapes and representations of colonial cities, particularly Havana.

Mulet Batista is a member of the National Union of Writers and Artists of Cuba (UNEAC). Her work has been presented in numerous solo and group exhibitions in several countries and is held in public and private collections internationally.

== Early life and education ==
Mulet Batista studied visual arts at the Academia de Bellas Artes de San Alejandro in Havana. During her studies she specialized in interior design and costume design for Cuban television. Her training also included drawing and applied design techniques, which later influenced the range of media used in her artistic work.

== Artistic career ==
Since the 1980s Mulet Batista has developed an artistic practice centered on urban landscapes and imagery of colonial cities. Havana has been a recurring theme in both her painting and poetry, and some of her projects combine visual and textual elements.

Her career includes more than forty solo exhibitions held in countries such as Cuba, Mexico, Spain, Italy, Uruguay, the United States, Jamaica, and Colombia. She has also participated in nearly sixty group exhibitions and in international art fairs including ARCO Madrid, the Marbella International Contemporary Art Fair, and Art Basel.

== Projects and educational work ==
In 2000 Mulet Batista developed a project to establish a School of Fine Arts in Arauca, Colombia, in collaboration with local authorities. The initiative focused on promoting artistic education in the region.

Her works are included in institutional collections such as the Museo de Camagüey, the Museo de la Danza in Havana, the Museo de Arte Colonial, and the Museo de la Ciudad in Havana. They are also part of university and private collections in several countries.

== Literary work ==
In addition to her visual art, Mulet Batista has written poetry and narrative works. Her publications include El libro Blanco, a poetry collection that addresses everyday and existential themes and reflects connections between her literary and visual practices.
