= Mafizullah Kabir =

Bangladeshi historian and researcher (1925–1986)

Mafizullah Kabir (28 February 1925 - 1986) was a Bangladeshi historian and researcher. He was a professor of history at the University of Dhaka.

== Early life ==
Kabir was born on 28 February 1925 in Noakhali District, Bengal Presidency, British India. In 1941, he finished his High Madrasah and in 1943, his Intermediate Examinations. He learned Arabic and Persian while studying at the madrassah. He did his undergraduate in 1946 and graduate studies in 1947 in history from the University of Dhaka. He completed his Ph.D. at the SOAS University of London in 1953 with his thesis on Buyid dynasty. The Iran Society of Calcutta published his thesis in 1964.

== Career ==
In 1950, Kabir joined the University of Dhaka as a lecturer. In the early 1960s, he was part of a study trip of history masters students from the University of Dhaka to India. In 1972, he published his book, Experiences of an exile at home: Life in Occupied Bangladesh, on his experiences during the Bangladesh Liberation War which became an important source on that time in Bangladesh.

Kabir was the first pro-Vice Chancellor of the University of Dhaka from 1976 to 1981. He served as the treasurer, vice-president, and general secretary of the Asiatic Society of Bangladesh for various terms.

Kabir worked as the honorary curator of Dhaka City Museum. He wrote extensively on Islam and Muslim history. He served as the president of the Bangladesh Itihas Samiti (Bangladesh History Society).

Kabir died in 1986.

== Bibliography ==
- Outline of Islamic History (1963)
- The Buwayhid Dynasty of Baghdad (1964)
- Muslim Rule under the Sultans (1967, sponsored by the government of Pakistan)
- Experiences of an exile at home: Life in Occupied Bangladesh
- Islam and the Khilafat (1974)
- Golden Era of Muslim Civilization (1987)
