= Petrus Antonius de Clapis =

Italian nobleman, priest and humanist

Petrus Antonius de Clapis, Peter Anton von Clapis or Peter Anton Finariensis (c. 1440, Finale Ligure, Italy – 14 May 1512, Cologne) was an Italian nobleman, priest and humanist, mainly active in Germany. He was a canon of Worms Cathedral and Speyer Cathedral and chancellor of the University of Heidelberg.

== Life ==
From the Italian noble de Clapis family, he was a pupil of Francesco Filelfo. He taught at the universities of Dole and Basel and from about 1465 formed part of the humanist scholarly circle at the court of Frederick I, Elector Palatine in Heidelberg. He dedicated several works to Frederick, including his 1464 "Dialogus de dignitate principium" with a magnificent tribute page to the prince, who also showed Peter's own family crest - this is now in the Vatican Library as Codex Palatina latinus 1378. He also acted as Frederick's envoy to the pope and by 1470 was provost of the Andreasstift in Worms, Germany.
