= Selker Noor =

Lake in Schleswig-Holstein, Germany

Selker Noor (Dan. Selk Nor)
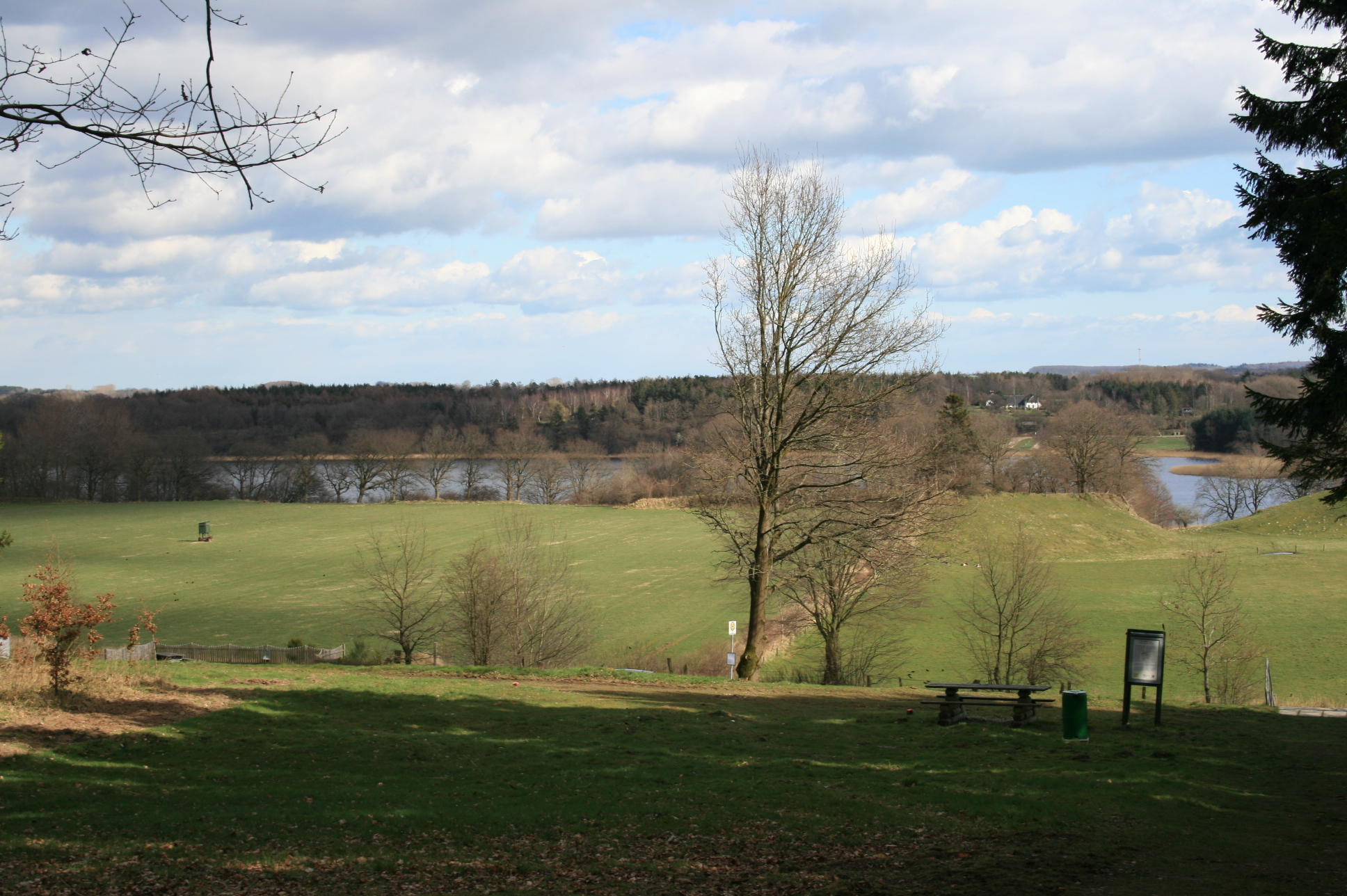

- Location within Schleswig-Holstein
- Location: Schleswig, Schleswig-Holstein
- Coordinates: 54°28′49″N 09°34′41″E
- Primary inflows: Selker Mühlengraben
- Primary outflows: Haddebyer Noor
- Catchment area: 31.8 km^{2} (12.3 sq mi)
- Basin countries: Germany
- Max. length: 1.3 km (0.81 mi)
- Max. width: 0.6 m (2 ft 0 in)
- Surface area: 0.558 km^{2} (0.215 sq mi)
- Average depth: 3.1 m (10 ft)
- Max. depth: 5.2 m (17 ft)
- Water volume: 1,737,000 m^{3} (1,408 acre⋅ft)
- Shore length^{1}: 3.3 km (2.1 mi)
- Surface elevation: 0 m (0 ft)
- ^{1} Shore length is not a well-defined measure.

Selker Noor (Danish: Selk Nor) is a lake in Schleswig, Schleswig-Holstein, Germany. At an elevation of 0 m, its surface area is 0.558 km^{2}.
