= Andreasstift =

Coordinates: 49°37′42″N 8°21′27″E

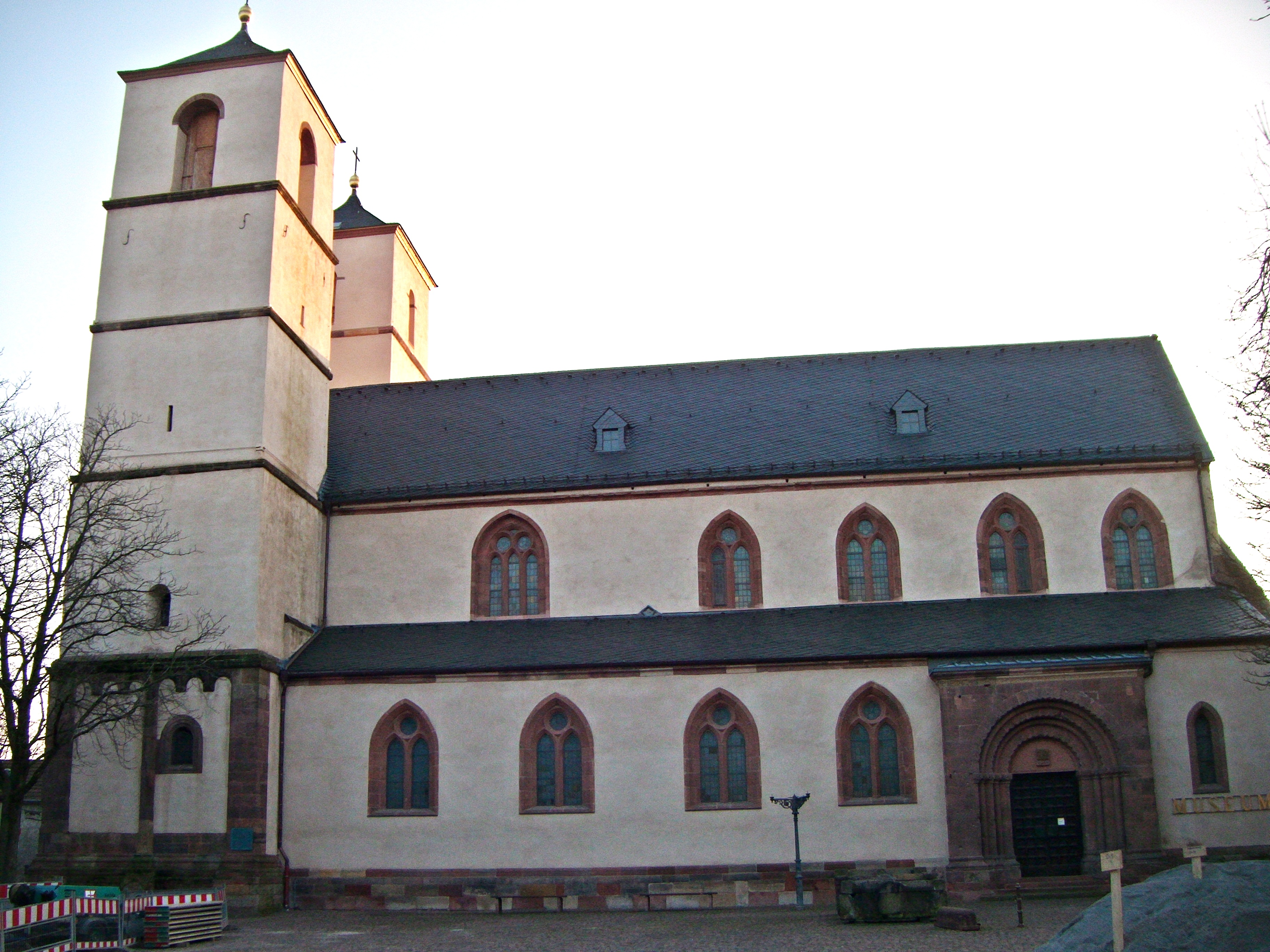
The former Andreaskirche.

The Andreasstift was a building complex in Worms, Germany, now housing Worms City Museum. It is located near Worms Cathedral and the Magnuskirche.

The community it housed was founded before 1000 as a mountain-top community but was moved to a new building within Worms' city walls in 1020 by order of bishop Burchard of Worms. He also ordered the building of the cathedral and of two churches dedicated to St Paul and St Martin. He supported the election of his pupil Henry II and thus became sole ruler of Worms.

The complex now centres on the former Andreaskirche, founded between 1180 and 1200 as a three-aisled Romanesque church. The church's north door shows similarities to the west choir of Worms Cathedral, suggesting it was built at the same time. Two wings of its cloister survive and are now used as a lapidarium.

The church's windows were replaced with Gothic style ones after a fire in 1200. The humanist Peter Anton von Clapis became its provost in 1470. The church and monastery were destroyed in 1689 during the Nine Years' War and only restored in 1761.

The final provost was Clemens August von Stefne. In 1800 the monastery and church were secularized and desanctified by Napoleon I, seeing use as a barracks, a hay barn, a fruit yard, a fire station and the base for the town's official carriages. It was restored again from 1928 to 1930 thanks to a legacy of 200,000 gold marks from Baron Maximilian von Heyl, the younger brother of the Worms industrialist Cornelius Wilhelm von Heyl.

The area was occupied by France from November 1918 onwards. The end of the occupation was marked on 1 July 1930 by a procession from the city museum (then in the Paulusstift) to the Andreasstift - this also marked the museum's transfer to the Andreasstift. The complex was almost completely destroyed by Allied air raids in the final months of World War II. It was restored between 1945 and 1947 during the second French occupation of the area and again in 2007.

The museum's director from 1980–2012 was Mathilde Grünewald.
