= Raffaello Celommi =

Italian painter (1881–1957)

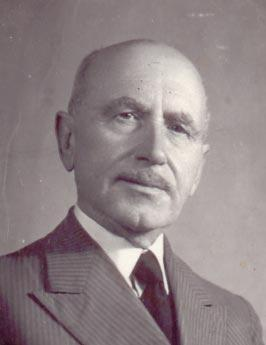
Raffaello Celommi

Raffaello Celommi (19 April 1881 – 3 March 1957) was an Italian genre and seascape painter.

== Biography ==
He was born in Florence to the painter Pasquale Celommi and his Florentine mother, Giuseppina Giusti. Within a few months, he developed respiratory ailments, and his mother moved to Roseto degli Abruzzi, a sea-side town in the province of Abruzzo, hoping the marine air would benefit him. His childhood nickname was Felluccio. He lived the rest of his life in Roseto, with some trip to Rome to study at the Academy of Fine Arts of Rome. His paintings often depict themes of boats and fishermen at the shoreline. He was visited in his studio by Francesco Paolo Michetti. Some of his works are on display at the Museo Civico di Teramo.
