= Schleswig City Museum =

Coordinates: 54.505463°N 9.541332°E

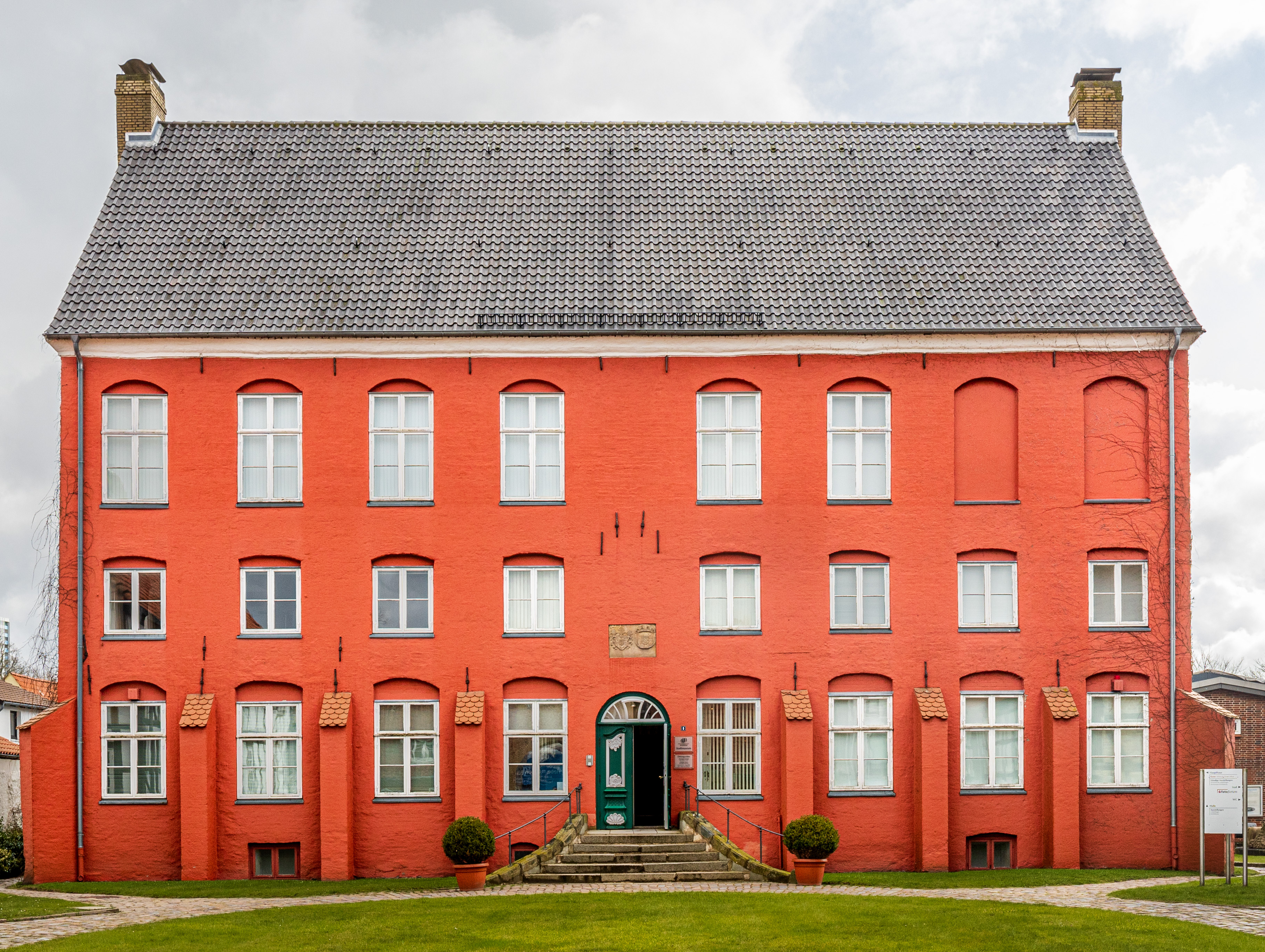
- Front view of the museum
- Established: 1932
- Location: Schleswig, Schleswig-Holstein
- Type: City Museum
- Executive director: Dörte Beier
- Owner: City of Schleswig
- Website: www.stadtmuseum-schleswig.de

The Schleswig City Museum is located in the Günderorthschen Court, an ensemble of historical buildings in the Friedrichstrasse in the Schleswig district Friedrichsberg. The exhibition provides an overview of the city of Schleswig and Schleswig-Holsteins history and culture dating back to the Middle Ages. The city museum has an exhibition space of 1500 m² in five buildings, including the Museum of Outsider Art and the Holm Museum.

== History of the Günderorthschen Court ==
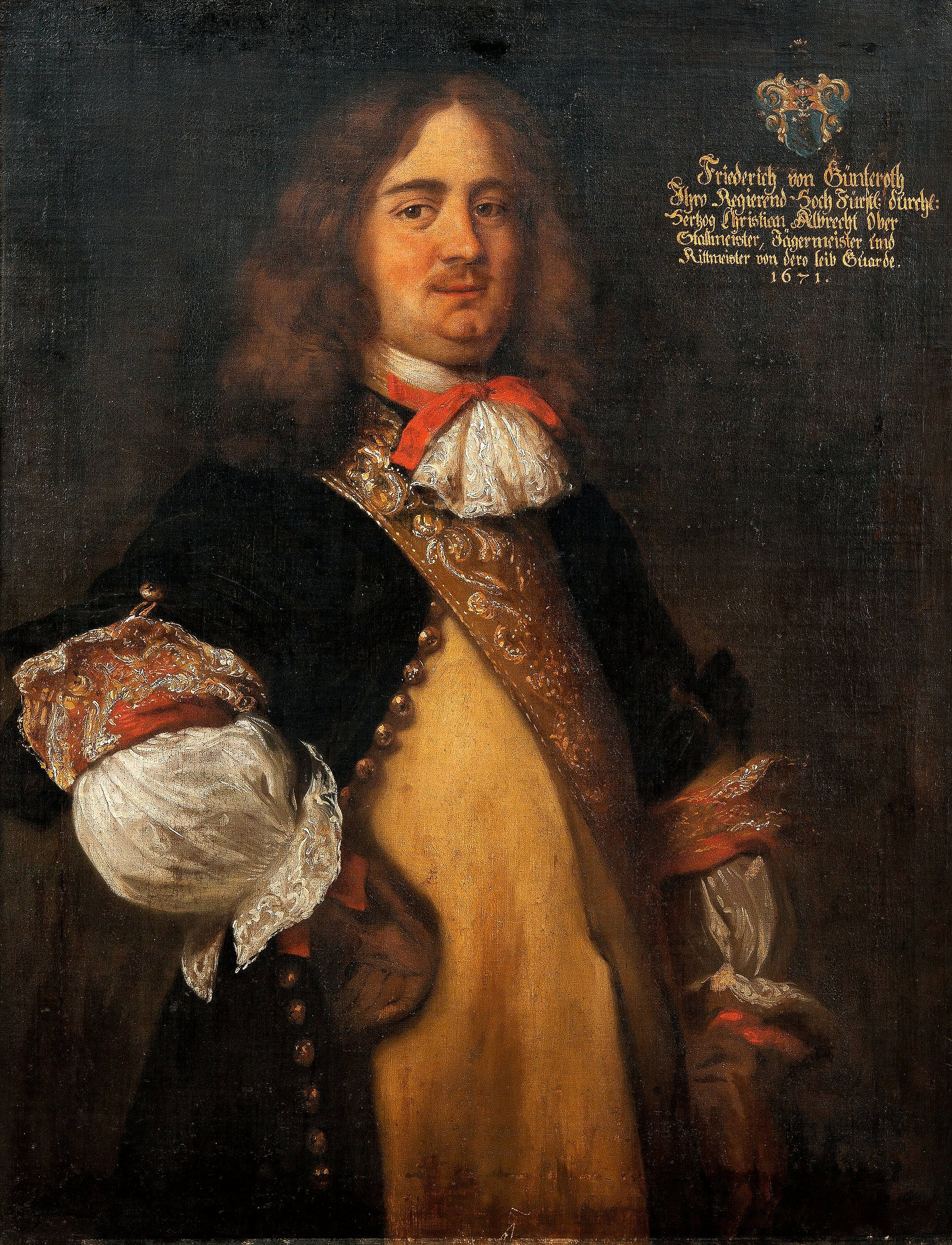
Jürgen Ovens: Portrait of Friedrich von Günderoth, 1671, Schleswig City Museum

The main building was erected in 1634 by Frederick III, Duke of Holstein-Gottorp. The red painted palace once served as a guest house. In 1675, it came into the hands of the noble head equerry Friedrich von Gründeroth, after whom the house is named. There are two half-timbered houses from the 18th century on the flanks of the main building, which give the complex the closed character of a courtyard. In 1851, the city of Schleswig bought the Günderothschen Court which has housed the city museum since 1932.

== The museum's early days ==
The city museum collection was started in 1879, when citizens of Schleswig founded the Association for the Collection and Conservation of Patriotic Antiquities in the City of Schleswig. The first permanent exhibition -Museum of Antiquities- opened in Gallberg 3, which was given to the museum in 1892. It was run by the Society of Antiquities for the Schleswig region, which was founded in 1903. The exhibition portrayed the history, culture and folk art of Schleswig and the region.

In 1930 the excavations at Haddebyer Noor led to the idea of creating a Hedeby Museum in Schleswig which was realised in 1932. The magistrate made the Günderothschen Court available under the condition that the newly founded Schleswig-Hedeby-Museum would take on the collection of the Museum of Antiquities.

== Reorganisation and current permanent exhibition ==
The museum's profile was reorganised in 1950. From then on, the permanent exhibitions presented the city's history up to the present day. The exhibitions were supplemented by special collections and exhibitions. The building was initially called the Municipal Museum, but changed its name to City Museum in 2001. Apart from the exhibition space in the Günderothschen Court, the City Museum has further branches: the Museum of Outsider Art and the Holm Museum.

The four-story palace, which is the main building of the Günderothschen Court, houses an exhibition on the city's history. The most important historical stages of Schleswig, its German-Danish past, the history of the Schleswig capital of the Prussian province Schleswig-Holstein, Nazism and the time after 1945 are presented here. Special themed areas are the cabinet with Schleswig faience, a room on the history of a fishing settlement on the Holm (Schleswig) and the Schleswig room, which gives an insight into the living culture of middle-class families in the 19th century. On the top floor, a toy collection is exhibited, containing dollhouses, toy theaters, tin toys and rocking horses from around 1900. The private collection goes back to the Schleswig paediatrician Joachim Gunkel and consists of more than 500 exhibits.

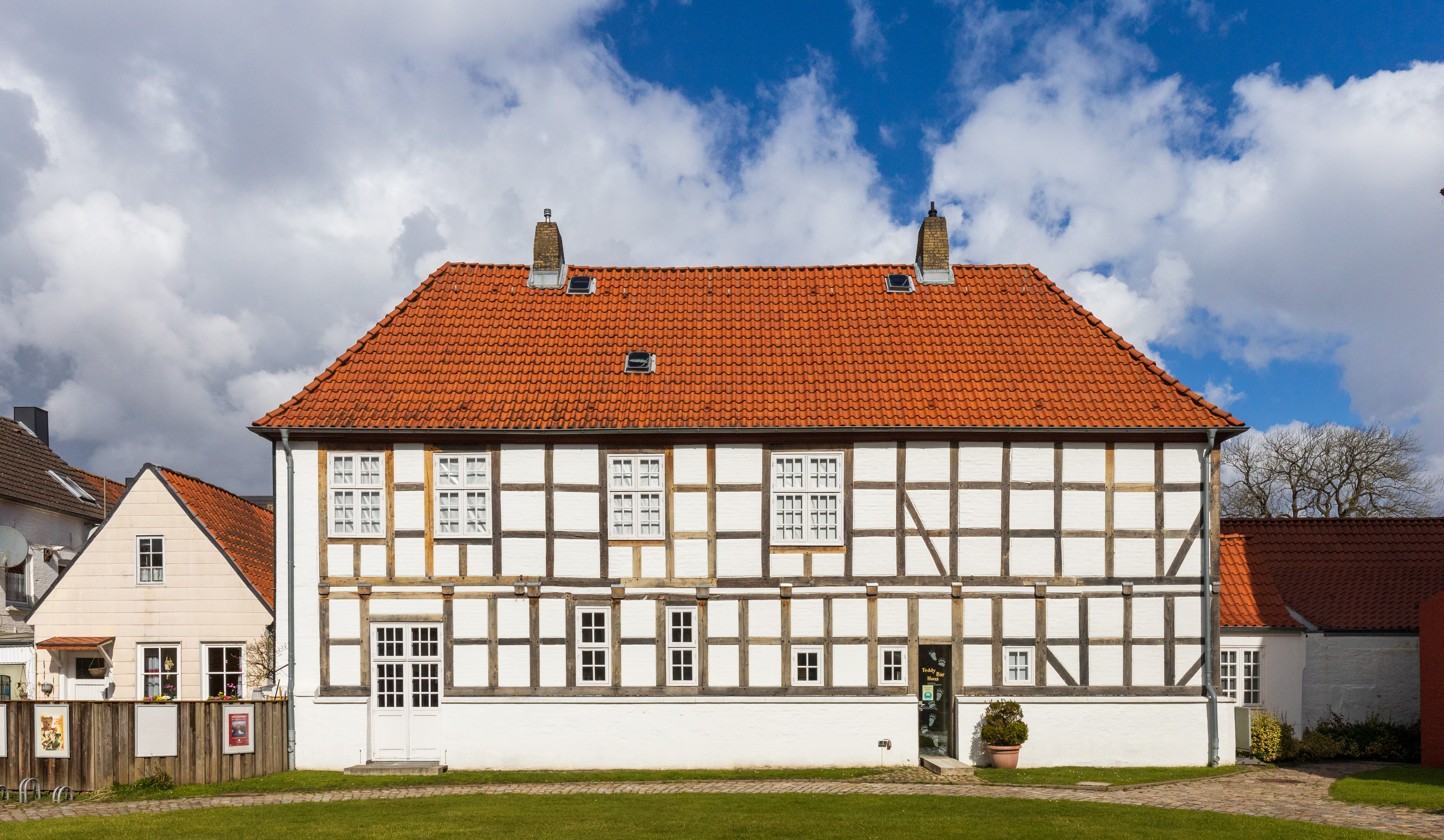
One of the two half-timbered houses flanking the main building.

There are two adjacent buildings flanking the main building; one is a former grain silo while the other is a former stable of the Günderothschen Court. The special exhibitions are housed here along with exhibitions on the history of photography. In one of these half-timbered houses you can find the Teddy Bear Housesince 2002 it contains a private collection of teddy bears.

The city museum decided to use the former school of the Friedrichsberg district as a place for a historical printing shop. In this exhibition, where visitors can expect objects from former Schleswig companies such as a complete manual typesetter and a working linotype machine. All of these exhibits are reminders for the visitors that Schleswig was one of the earliest places to have mechanical printing in the Middle Ages.

== Special exhibitions ==
Over the years the Schleswig city museum has had special exhibitions on the following different topics.

- Special exhibition 2020:
  - Claus Vahle. Modern inspiration.
  - A Day Off. Pictures from a collection F. C. Gundlach
  - European photographer of the year. The winning pictures of 2019
- Special exhibition 2019:
  - Visions of the North
  - Aesthetic profile of the Domschule Schleswig
  - European photographer of the year. The winning pictures of 2018
  - 100 Jahre Gewerkschaften des öffentlichen Dienstes in Schleswig
  - Earth. Pictures taken by Hans Strand
  - Silke Brix. Children's book illustrations
  - Wonders of the deep. Pictures taken by Solvin Zankl
- Special exhibition 2018:
  - LYS. A homage to the lights in the North
  - Object and abstraction. Aestetic profile of the Lornsenschule Schleswig
  - Hallig Gröde: Far reaching times. Annabelle Fürstenau
  - All That Life Can Afford. Pictures taken by Matt Stuart
  - RED. Communal exhibition by the artists' associations MACY and Offene Ateliers
- Special exhibition 2017:
  - Spinning. A life review
  - Alfred Ehrhardt. In between Schlei and Eider
  - Final exhibition of the aesthetic profile of the Domschule Schleswig
  - European photographer of the year. The winning pictures of 2016
  - You can be anything in a comic. Be a superhero!
  - Fairytales. Pictures taken in nature by Klaus Tamm
