= Museo Civico di Teramo =

Coordinates: 42.6618°N 13.6976°E

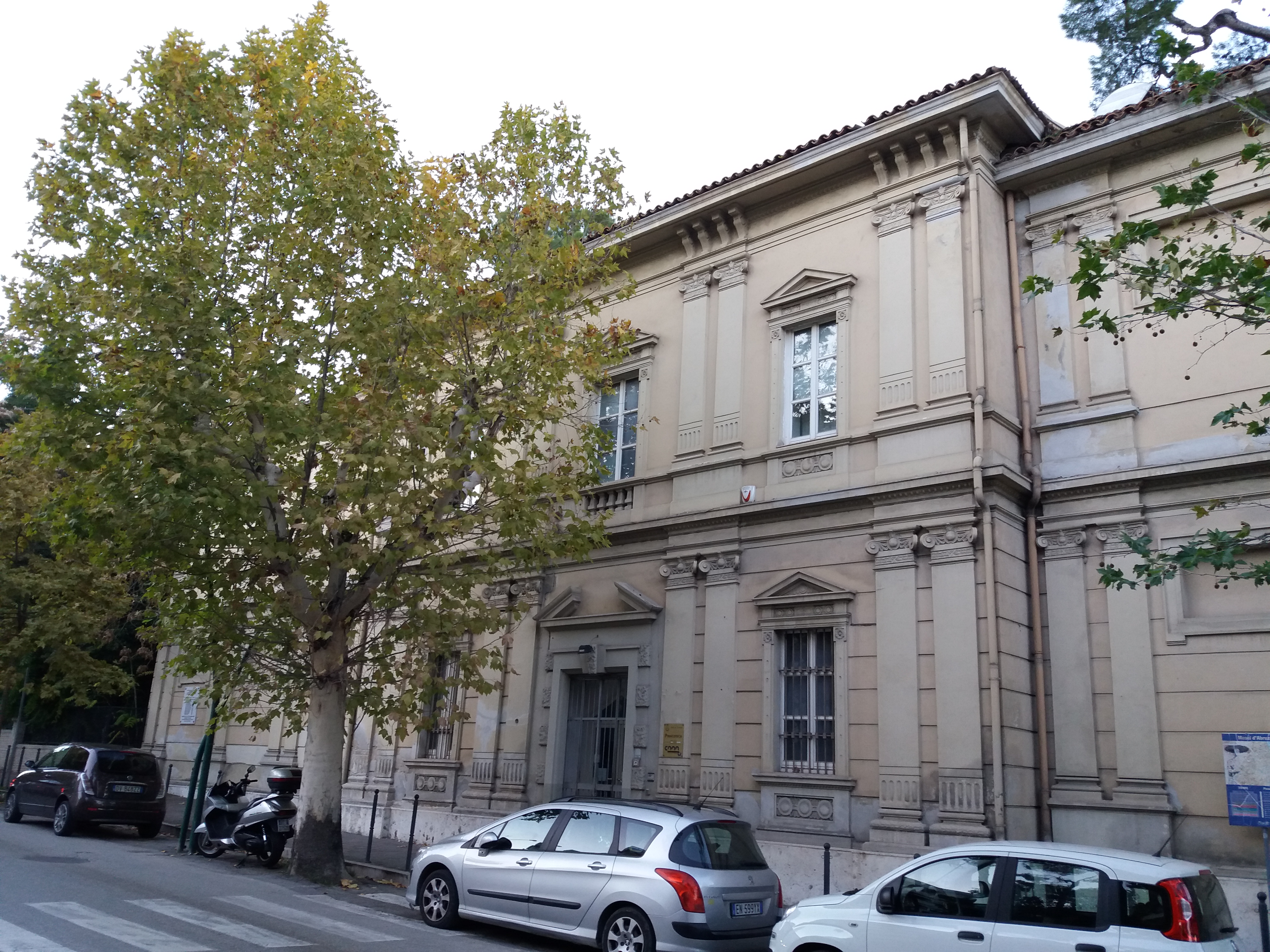
- Location: Teramo
- Type: Art museum

Museo Civico di Teramo (Italian for Civic Museum of Teramo) is an art museum in Teramo, Abruzzo.

== History ==
The museum collections mainly derived from suppressed ecclesiastic institutions during the years 1868 and 1888. Initially, the works were displayed in a palace next to the church of Sant'Anna. The discovery of ancient Roman items in town, expanded the collections.

== Collections ==
Among the works on display are:

- Madonna del Melograno by Giacomo da Campli
- Saints Bonaventure and Sebastian by Master of the Crivelleschi polyptych
- Saints Jerome and Francis by an anonymous local painter
- Madonna and Child by an anonymous local painter
- Crucifixion by a follower of Pietro Damini
- Pope Eleuterius consigns document of excommunication to Bishop Francesco Chiericati Veneto-lombard school
- Original Sin by Paolo De Matteis
- Jesus and the Samaritan by Venetian school
- Last Supper a copy of a Joos van Cleve painting
- Madonna of Rosary and Saints by Francesco Solimena
- Madonna and Child by Francesco de Mura
- Magdalen (anonymous Neapolitan)
- Baptism of Constantine by Sebastiano Conca
- Madonna and Child and St Anne a copy of a Carlo Saraceni painting
- Amore and Psyche by Candlelight Master
- Faun by a follower of Pier Francesco Mola
- Still Life by anonymous lombard painter
- Still Life and flowers by a follower of Giuseppe Recco
- Still Life by Aniello Ascione
- Battle scene by Francesco Antonio Simonini
- Decoration by Corrado Giaquinto
- Papessa Giovanna by Angelo Caroselli
- Seascape by Leonardo Coccorante
- Veduta with ruins by Leonardo Coccorante
- Portrait of ecclesiastic by Benedetto Gennari
- Portrait of nobleman, attributed to Jacob Ferdinand Voet
- Self-portrait by Giuseppe Bonolis
- Portrait by Gennaro Della Monica
- Four Seasons by Pasquale Celommi
- Political operator by Pasquale Celommi
- Palazzo Donn'Anna by Gaetano Esposito
- Contadina con falce by Basilio Cascella
- Preparing flag by Cesare Averardi
- Portrait of Sister Gemma by Cesare Averardi
- Contemplation by Raffaello Celommi
- Leaving to Fish by Raffaello Celommi
- Figura by Guido Montauti
- Still Life by Giovanni Gromo
- Dogana by Gonsalvo Carelli
- Blind orphan of Abruzzo by Raffaello Pagliaccetti
- Portrait of Gaetano Braga by Costantino Barbella
- Madonna and Baptism of Christ, ceramic attributed to Berardino Gentili
- Holy Family, ceramic attributed to Candeloro Cappelletti
- St Antony and Child Jesus, ceramic attributed to Liborio Grue
- Landscape, maiolica attributed to Nicola Tommaso Grue
