= Magnuskirche, Worms =

Church building in Rhineland-Palatine, Germany

Coordinates: 49°37′43″N 8°21′31″E

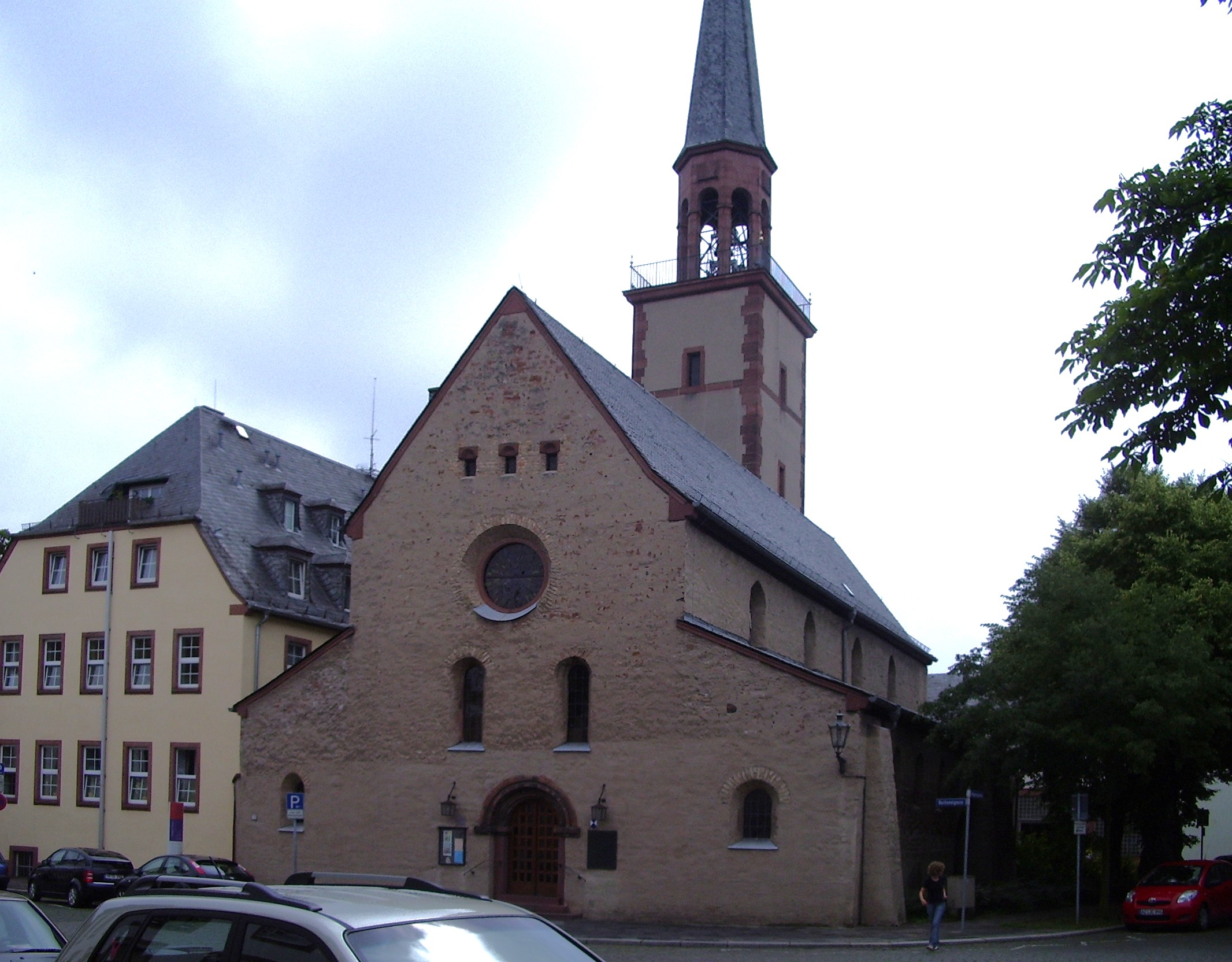
The Magnuskirche in Worms.

The Magnuskirche is a small church in Worms, Germany, to the south of Worms Cathedral. It is the city's smallest church. Archaeological evidence and its dedication (probably identifiable with Magnus of Füssen, a Carolingian saint) suggest it originated in the 8th century - part of that building survives in the nave's north wall.

Its first mention in the written record dates to 1141. It was enlarged many times between the 10th and 15th centuries and during that era served as the nearby Andreasstift's parish church. It is the oldest Lutheran church in south-west Germany, since Martin Luther stayed in it and preached in it during the 1520 Diet of Worms. After the severe damage to the city in 1689 during the Nine Years' War, the church was restored in the Baroque style in 1756. It was destroyed by Allied bombing on 21 February 1945 and restored again in 1953.

== See also ==
- List of Jesuit sites

== Sources ==
- (in German) Walter Hotz, Fritz Reuter, Otto Kammer: Die Magnuskirche in Worms. Evangelische Magnusgemeinde Worms, Worms 1978.
- (in German) Karsten Preßler: Die Magnuskirche in Worms. Rheinische Kunststätten, Heft 469. Neusser Druckerei und Verlag, Neuss 2002. ISBN 3-88094-889-5.
- (in German) http://www.magnusgemeinde.de/
