= Tire City Museum =

Museum in Turkey

- Tire Kent Müzesi
- Tire City Museum
- Established: 2014; 12 years ago
- Location: Tire, İzmir Province, Turkey
- Coordinates: 38°05′18″N 27°43′56″E
- Type: Ethnography, memorial

Tire City Museum is located in Tire ilçe (district) in İzmir Province, Turkey, at 38°05′18″N 27°43′56″E. The building is the former city hall of Tire. It was built in 1955. After the construction of a newer building for the municipality, the former building was restored and opened as Tire City Museum on 15 October 2014.

== Sections ==
The sections of the museum are as follows:

- Entrance and the upper aisle: Tire etymology and history, Tire municipality and former mayors, Hakan Sepici's collections
- Lower aisle: ethnography (clothes, bath material)
- First hall: famous people of Tire origin such as Seha Gidel, Fuat Mensi Dileksiz, Tanju Okan, Gönül Duman, and Nejat Uygur
- Second hall and the market: endangered handicrafts
- Third hall: annually changing exhibits (in 2016, archaeology)
- Fourth hall: food culture, copper works, pharmacy, clock repair
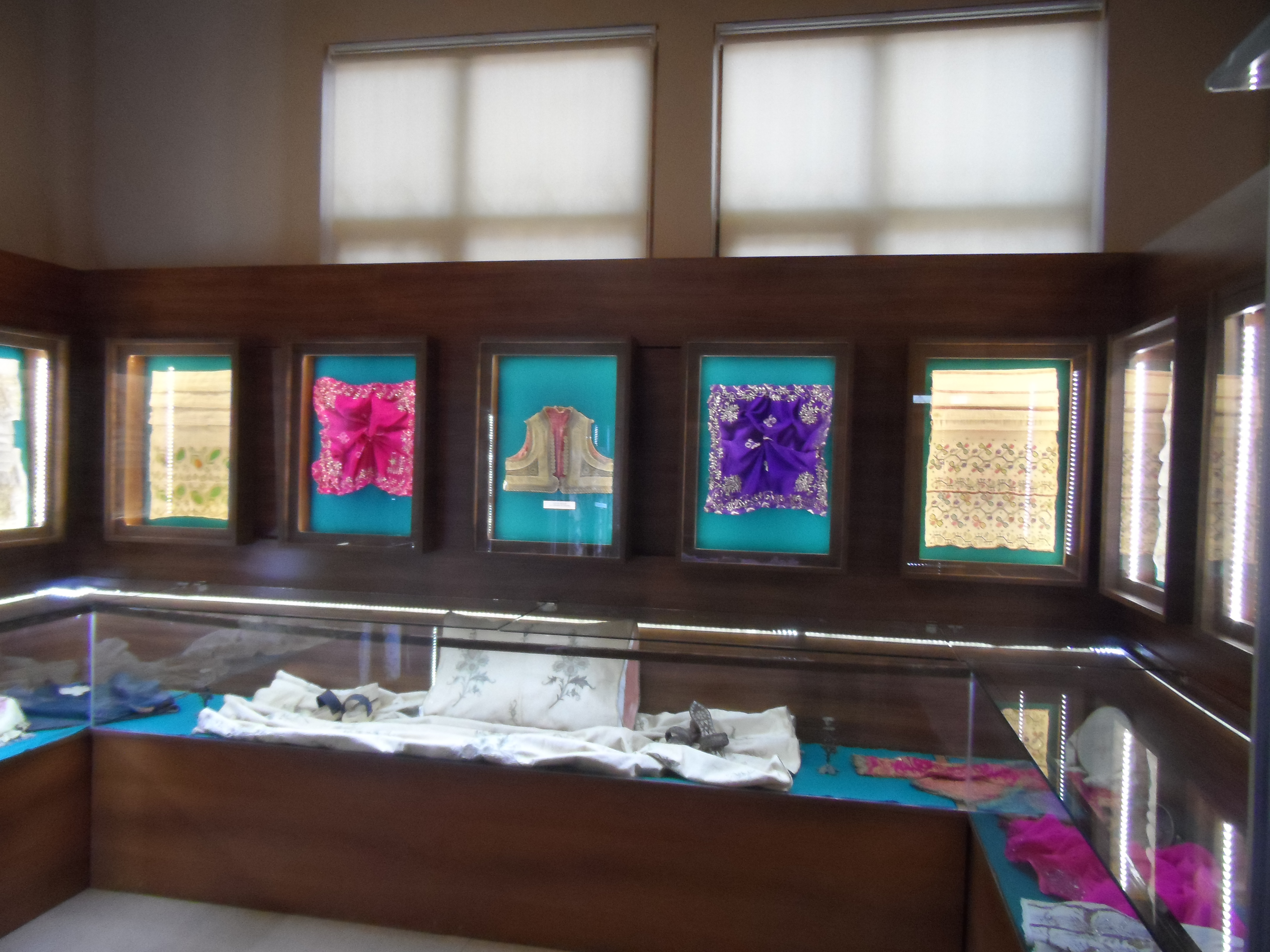

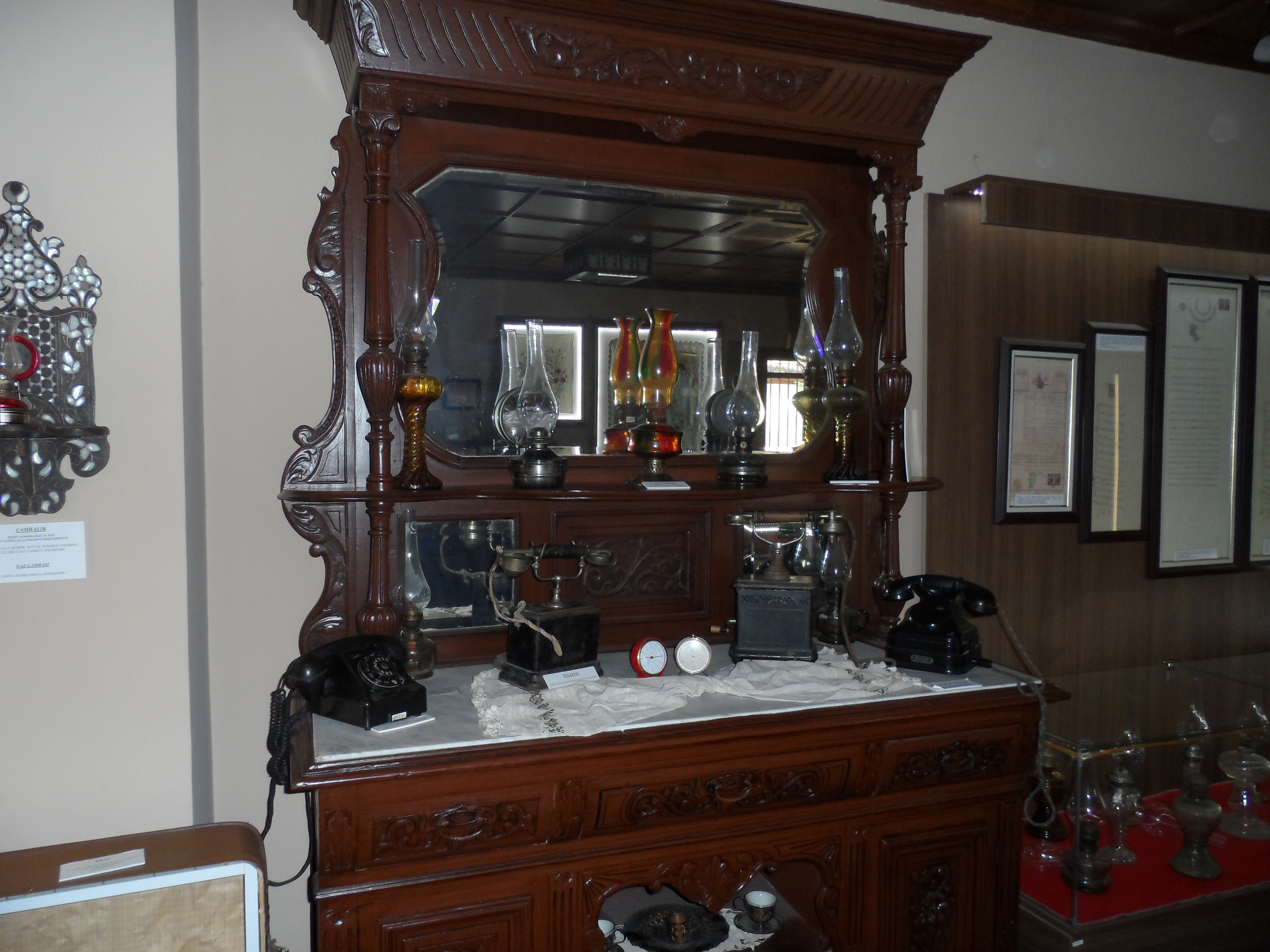
