= Miyakojima City Museum =

Museum in Hirara, Okinawa Prefecture, Japan

- 宮古島市総合博物館
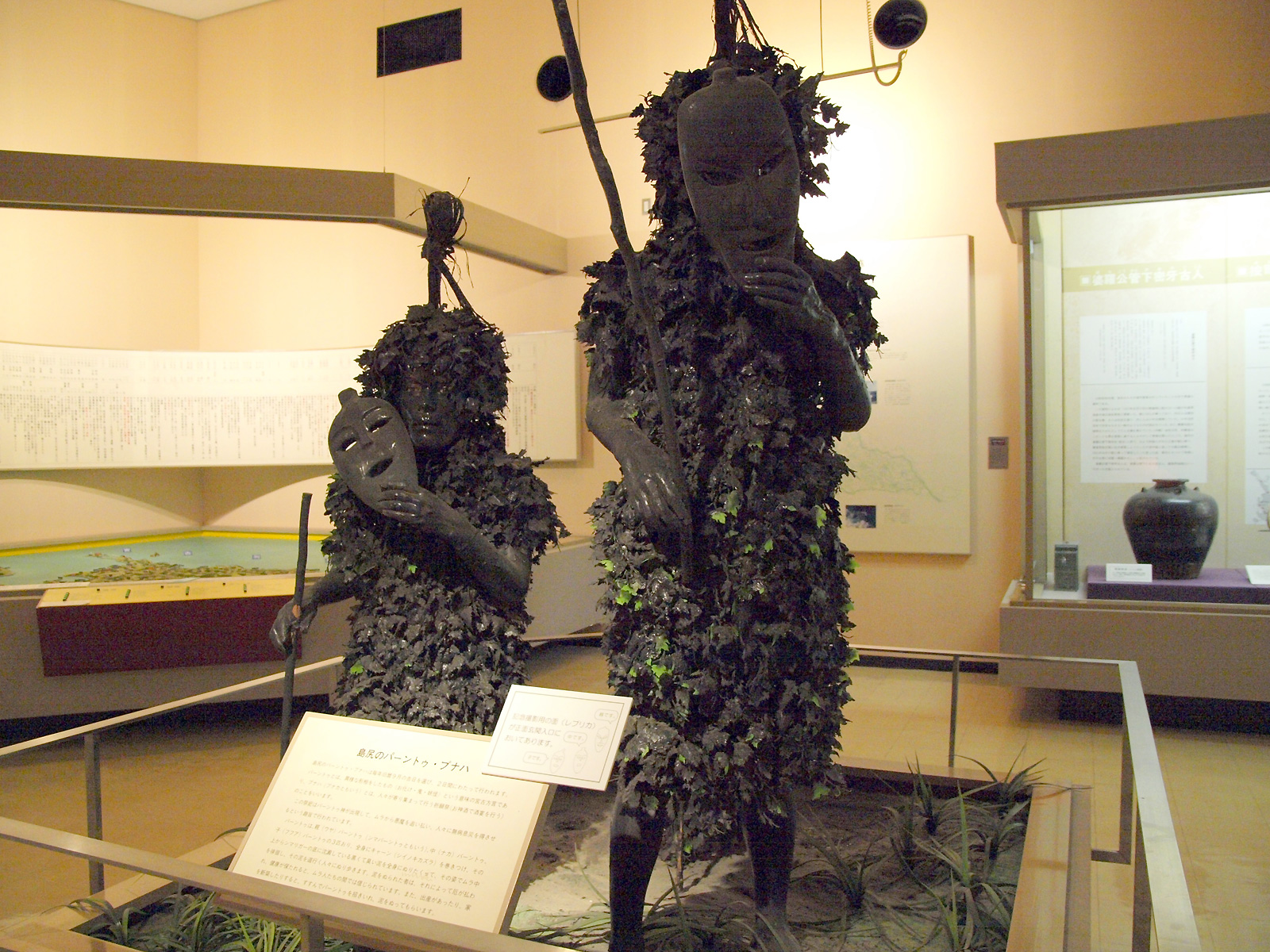
- Exhibits relating to Paantu; the annual festival is an Important Intangible Folk Cultural Property
- Interactive map of the Miyakojima City Museum area

General information
- Location: 1166-287 Higashinakasonezoe, Hirara, Miyakojima, Okinawa Prefecture, Japan
- Coordinates: 24°47′47″N 125°19′04″E
- Opened: November 1989

Website
- Official website

Miyakojima City Museum (宮古島市総合博物館, Miyakojima-shi Sōgō Hakubutsukan) opened as the Hirara City Museum of History and Folklore (平良市歴史民俗資料館) in Hirara, Okinawa Prefecture, Japan in 1989. Upon the merger of Hirara into Miyakojima in 2005, the museum reopened as the Miyakojima City Museum. It is dedicated to the area's natural history, history, folkways, and culture.

== See also ==
- Okinawa Prefectural Museum
- List of Important Intangible Folk Cultural Properties
- List of Cultural Properties of Japan - historical materials (Okinawa)
- List of Natural Monuments of Japan (Okinawa)
