= Athens City Museum =

Coordinates: 37°58′43.85″N 23°43′53.5″E

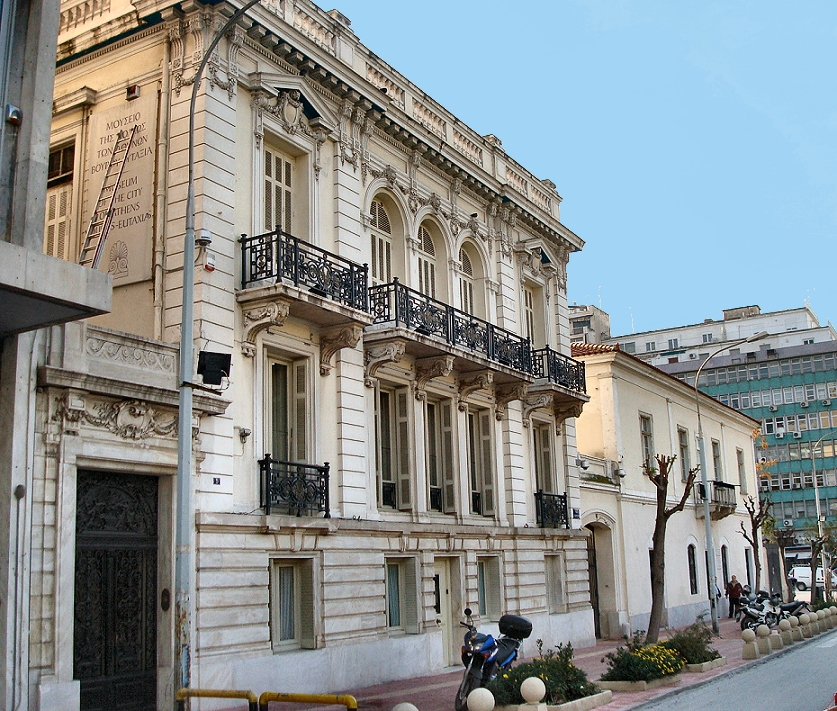
- Established: 1973
- Location: 5-7 Paparigopoulou Str., Athens, Greece
- Type: City museum
- Public transit access: Athens Metro stations: Panepistimio

Athens City Museum (Vouros-Eutaxias Foundation) is an art museum and former royal residence in Athens, Greece. It houses a collection of Athens-related items collected by art collector Lambros Eutaxias (1905-1996). The collection includes antiquities, Byzantine art, sculptures, paintings, drawings, photographs and metal, glass and textile works. It also includes furniture arranged in typical living rooms of the Athenian aristocracy of the 19th century.

This building was the first royal palace of Greece, under the reign of King Otto of Greece.
