= Nanjing City Wall Museum =

Museum in Nanjing, China

- 南京城墙博物馆
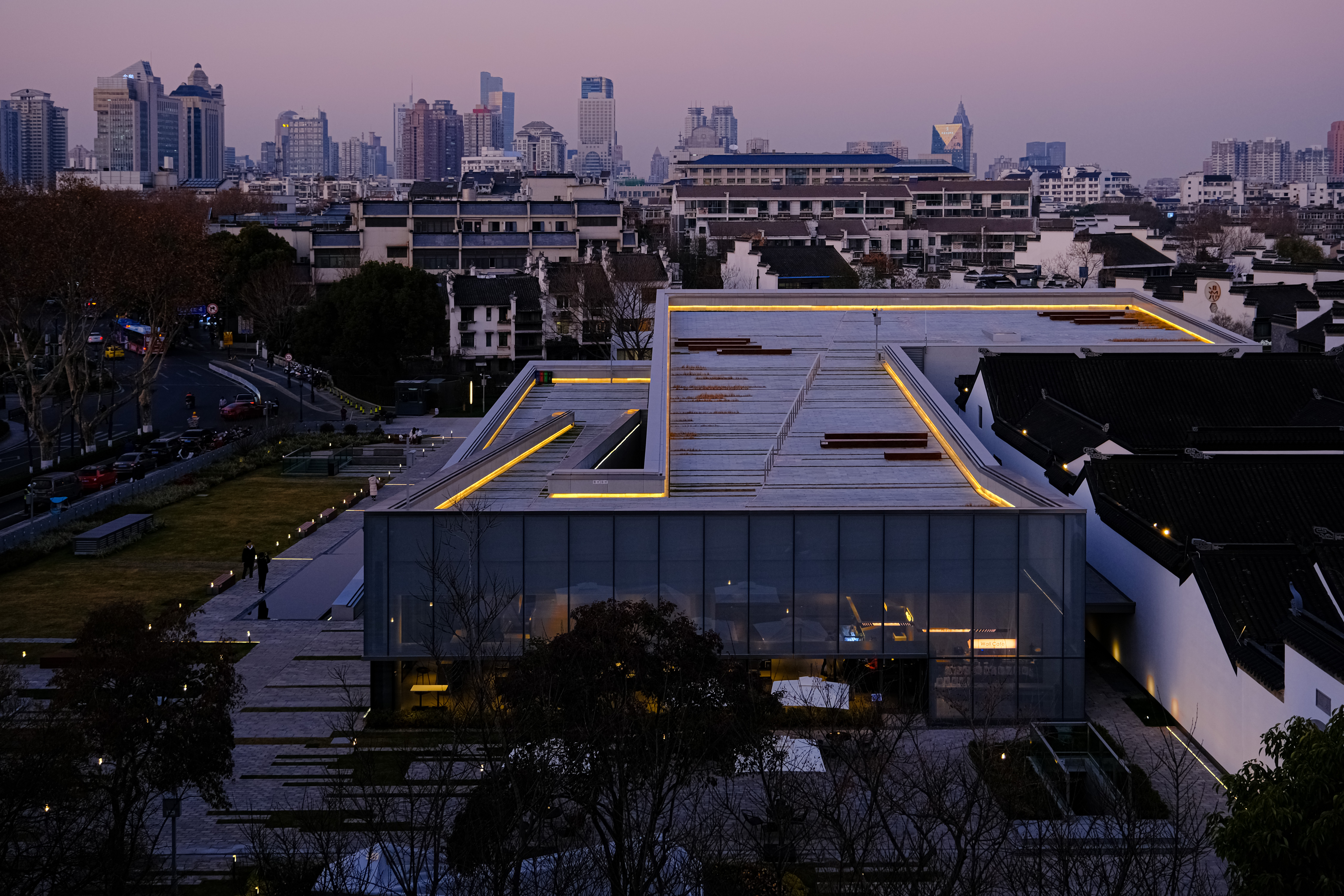
- Aerial view of the Nanjing City Wall Museum
- Established: December 2021
- Location: No. 1, Bianying, Xinminfang Road, Qinhuai District, Nanjing, Jiangsu, China
- Coordinates: 32.0201°N 118.7864°E
- Website: Official website

The Nanjing City Wall Museum (Chinese: 南京城墙博物馆) is a museum dedicated to the history and preservation of the Nanjing City Wall. It is located in Qinhuai District, Nanjing, Jiangsu Province, China, near Zhonghua Gate and the Nanjing Old East Gate Historical and Cultural District. The museum occupies an area of 6,681.4 square meters, with a total construction area of 13,089.3 square meters. Designed by He Jingtang and the Architectural Design and Research Institute of South China University of Technology, the museum officially opened in December 2021.

== History ==
In 2014, Nanjing established the Nanjing City Wall Protection and Management Center, which was tasked with leading the application for the Ming and Qing city walls to be recognized as a UNESCO World Heritage site. Due to space limitations at the original Ming City Wall History Museum in Taicheng, the decision was made in August 2015 to establish a new museum at the site of the former Shen Wansan Memorial Hall.

In September 2016, a global call for design proposals was launched. The winning proposal, led by He Jingtang, was selected in April 2017. Construction began on June 9, 2018, and the building was topped out on November 2, 2020. The museum began trial operations on December 28, 2021.

== Architecture and design ==
=== Concept ===
The design of the Nanjing City Wall Museum integrates the surrounding historical and natural environment. The building is characterized by a semi-transparent glass curtain wall and features a 50-meter-long ramp and rooftop platforms. These design elements aim to create harmony with the ancient city wall and provide visitors with panoramic views of the area.

=== Key features ===
The museum's structure gradually transitions in height, with a lower profile near the city wall. The design incorporates outdoor viewing pathways inspired by the horse ramps of Zhonghua Gate. Diffuse Reflection Curtain Wall: The building's exterior uses LOW-E glass curtain walls, which reflect the surrounding scenery without producing mirror-like effects, reducing light pollution. All-Weather Outdoor Platforms: The museum's three-level platforms are paved with bricks resembling those of the city wall, serving as open spaces for visitors to learn about and view the historic structure.

== Exhibitions ==
The museum's exhibition area spans approximately 8,700 square meters, including both permanent and special exhibition halls. Over 2,500 artifacts are displayed, with highlights including:

- A collection of over 700 city wall bricks. - Relics from the Ming Palace and the Lichuan Kiln in Jiangxi. - A triptych cinema showcasing scenes of Nanjing's urban life. - A detailed scale model of the Nanjing City Wall.

The main exhibition, titled "The Unparalleled City Wall", presents the wall's history, military functions, cultural significance, and modern preservation efforts. Interactive features, such as the "City Wall Memories" exhibit, allow visitors to explore personal and historical stories associated with the wall.

=== Special exhibitions ===
In 2024, the museum hosted "Eyes of Cultural Relics", an international exhibition featuring nearly 100 artifacts from the Aleppo Museum and the National Museum of Damascus, highlighting the shared cultural heritage of ancient civilizations.

== Visitor information ==
The museum is open year-round with free admission. Guided tours are available in multiple languages. The site is accessible by public transportation and offers parking facilities.

== See also ==
- City Wall of Nanjing
