= Ginowan City Museum =

Museum in Ginowan, Okinawa, Japan

- 宜野湾市立博物館
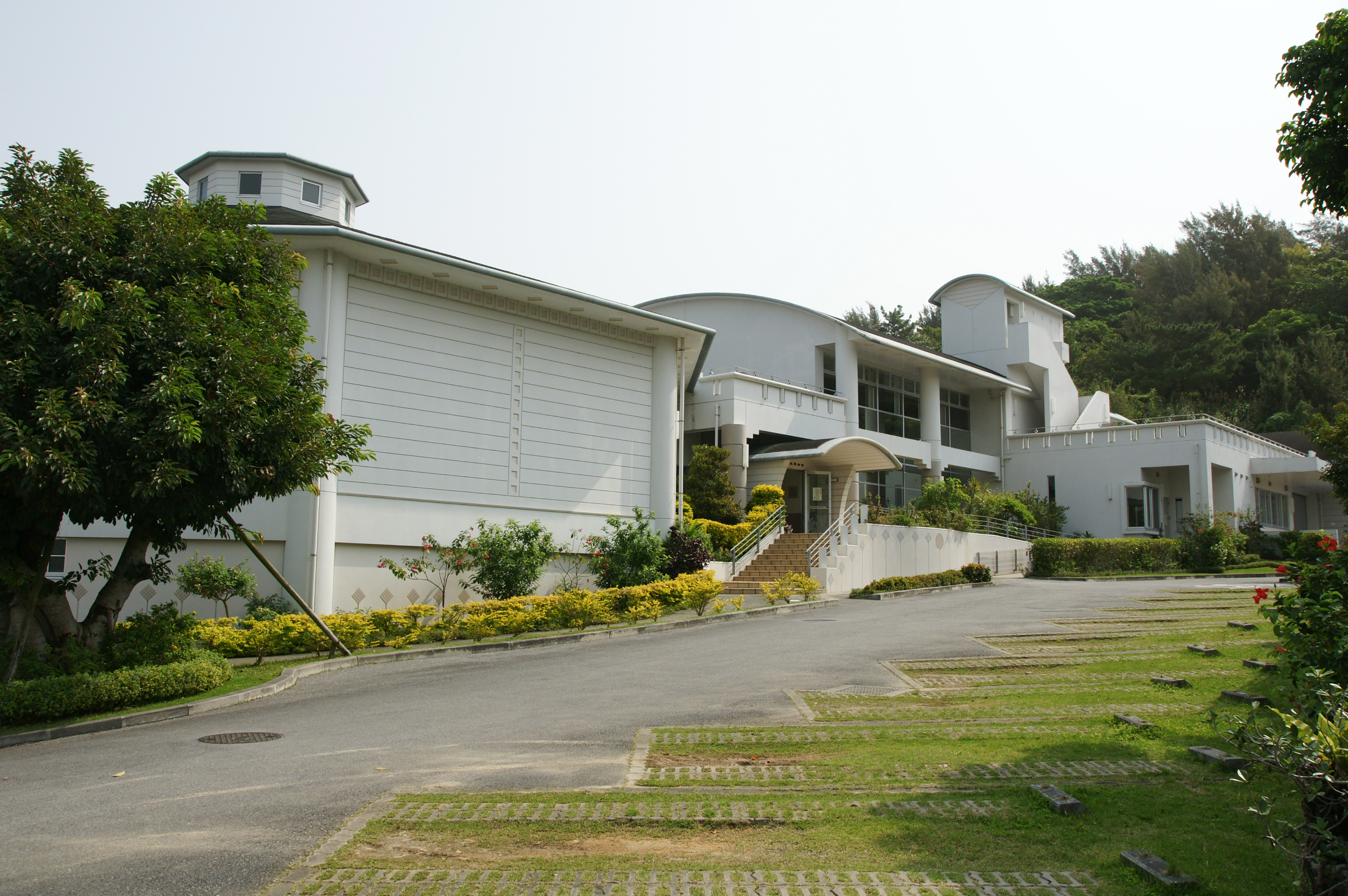
- Interactive map of the Ginowan City Museum area

General information
- Location: 1-25-1 Mashiki, Ginowan, Okinawa, Okinawa Prefecture, Japan
- Coordinates: 26°16′12″N 127°44′25″E
- Opened: 1 June 1999

Technical details
- Floor area: 1,390 square metres (15,000 sq ft)

Website
- Official website (ja)

Ginowan City Museum (宜野湾市立博物館, Ginowan Shiritsu Hakubutsukan) opened in Ginowan, Okinawa Prefecture, Japan in 1999. The displays relate to the city's archaeology, history, and folklore.

== See also ==
- Sakima Art Museum
- Motobu Udun Tomb
