= Giacomo da Campli =

Italian painter

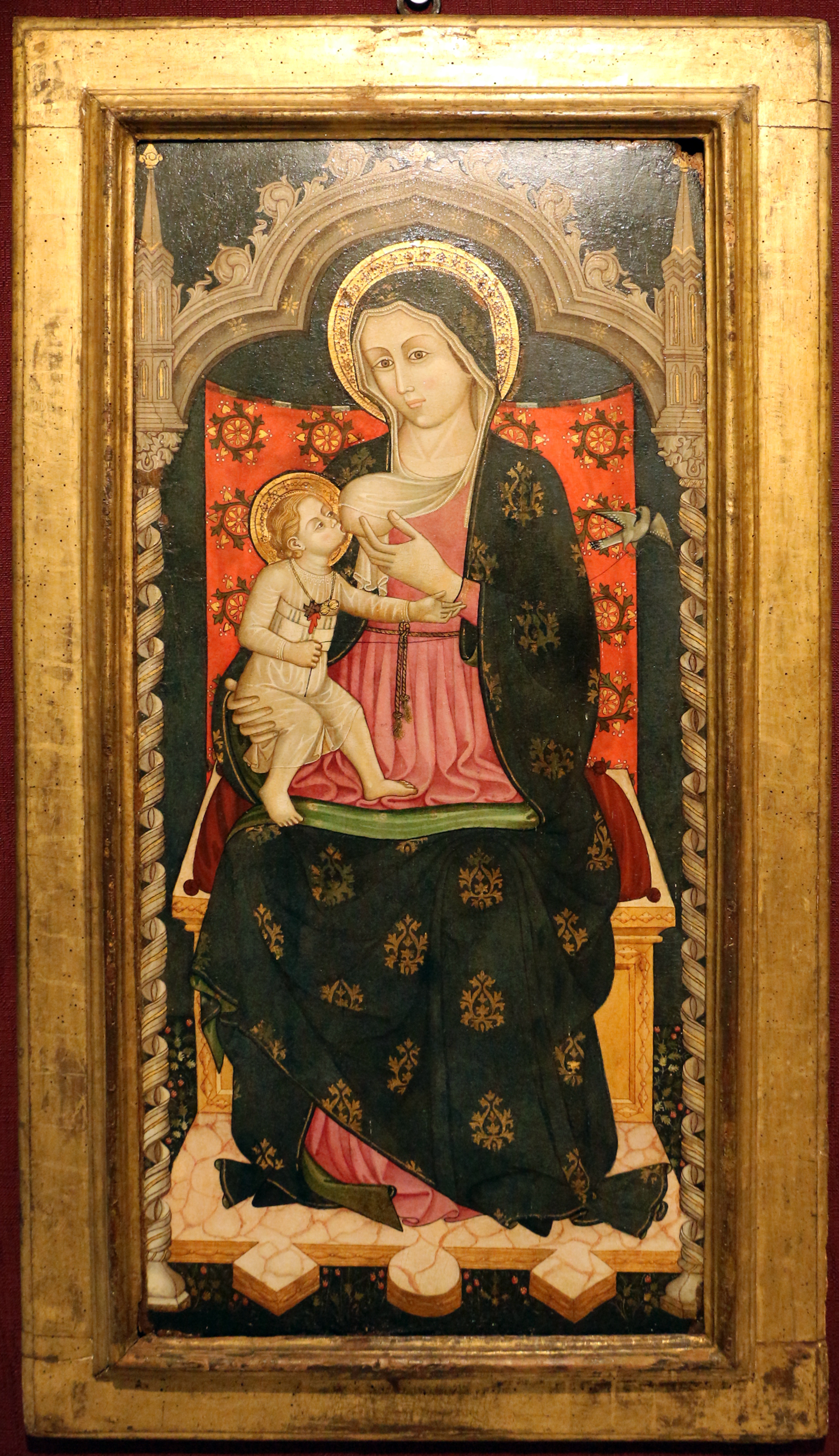
Madonna del latte

Giacomo da Campli (circa 1420 - died 1490s) was an Italian painter, active in the province of Teramo. He was born in Campli and is documented as active from 1461 to 1479.
