= Lahr City Museum =

Municipal historical museum of Lahr, Germany

Coordinates: 48.339153°N 7.871461°E

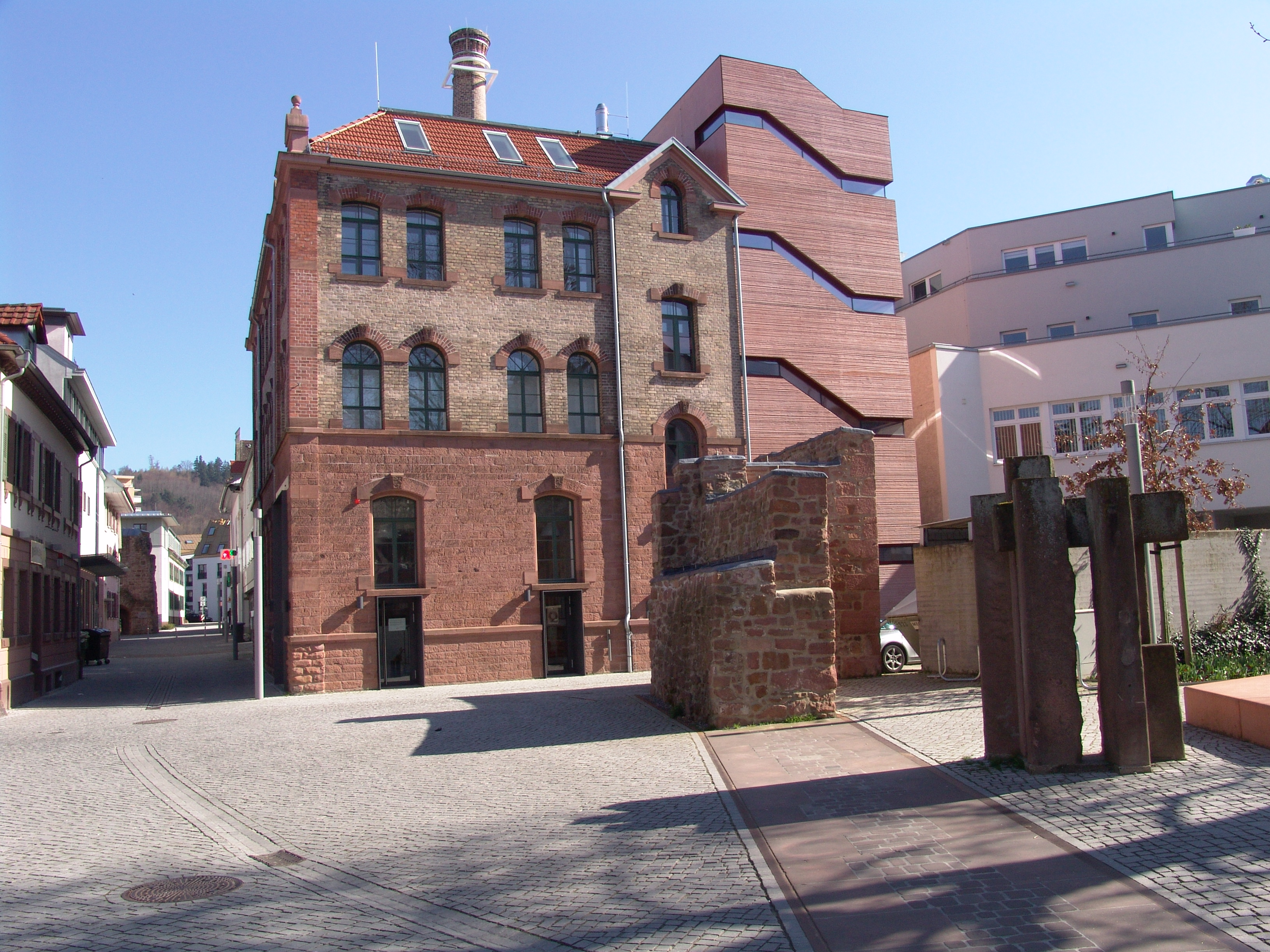
The Stadtmuseum Lahr Tonofenfabrik (2020)

The Lahr City Museum (Stadtmuseum Lahr) in Lahr/Schwarzwald was established in a former brick oven factory of the Ofen- und Tonwarenfabrik C.H. Liermann. It was officially inaugurated in 2018.

== History ==
The origins of the museum building date back to the late 19th century: Architect Carl Meurer commissioned the construction of the buildings in 1896 for Carl Friedrich Liermann. Earlier, in 1854, Christian Heinrich Liermann had founded the Ofen- und Tonwarenfabrik C.H. Liermann. For more than a hundred years, the factory produced around 3,000 tiled stoves annually until production ceased in 1957. In the early 2000s, the building's spaces were used as offices and storage. Plans for the establishment of the Stadtmuseum began in 2014. The museum was officially opened by the city in February 2018.

== Locations ==
=== Brick Oven Factory ===
The Brick Oven Museum is divided into three floors representing several epochs.

- Basement: This level showcases the city's prehistory, including the Roman period and the Early Middle Ages as well as the High Middle Ages.
- Ground Floor: This level exhibits city artifacts from the Late Middle Ages to the 20th century.
- First Floor: This exhibition, titled "Lahr and Industry," covers the city's approximately hundred-year industrial history up to the present.

=== Roman Facility ===
The Lahrer Streifenhaus is a replica of a Roman house, which was opened in 2018 as part of the Landesgartenschau Lahr/Schwarzwald 2018. During archaeological excavations in the 1990s, up to 200,000 artifacts were discovered. The excavations were carried out by a team from the University of Freiburg im Breisgau.

== Events ==
The museum is also known for its event series Kulturstammtisch and Museumsbar.
