= Pasig City Museum =

Historic house museum in Pasig, Philippines

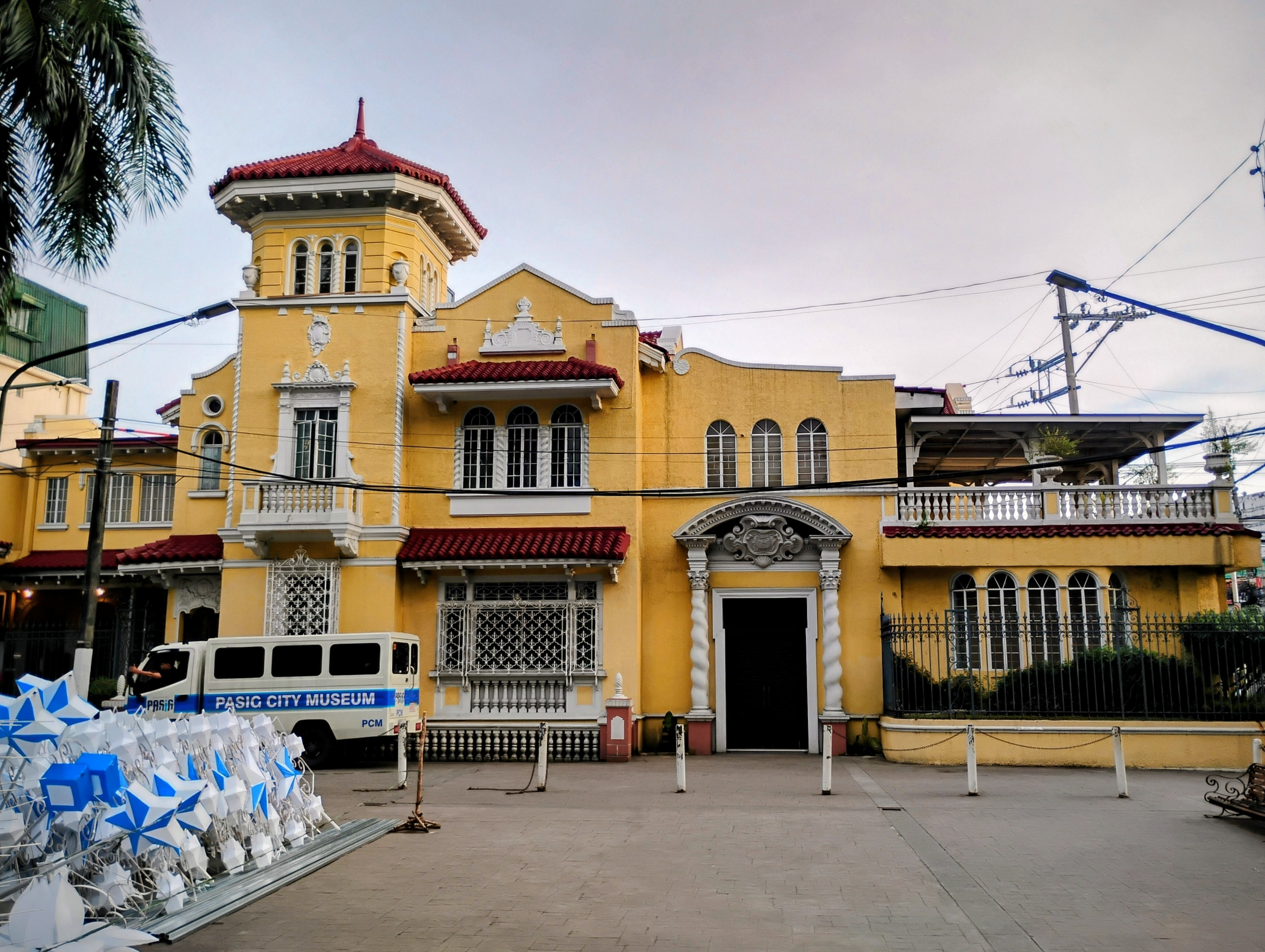
- Pasig City Museum

General information
- Status: active
- Type: Mansion
- Architectural style: Spanish-Baroque
- Location: Plaza Rizal, San Jose, Pasig
- Coordinates: 14°33′39″N 121°04′34″E
- Completed: 1937
- Inaugurated: 2001
- Renovated: 1980s
- Owner: Don Fortunato Concepcion

Technical details
- Floor count: 3

Design and construction
- Architect: Felizardo M. Dimanlig
- Awards: Best Local Museum 2009

Website
- Pasig City Museum Facebook page

The Pasig City Museum is a historic house museum in Pasig, Metro Manila in the Philippines. The museum is housed in the old Concepcion Mansion, owned by the former mayor of Pasig, Don Fortunato Cabrera Concepcion who served from 1918 to 1921. This magnificent structure was built as a gift to his wife, Victoria Concepcion. A native of Pasig, architect Felizardo M. Dimanlig, designed this Spanish-Baroque mansion and completed it in 1937. Today, the museum showcases the timeline of the history of Pasig, as well as collections of objects corresponding to periods of historical development of Pasig. It is in the poblacion area, at one end of Plaza Rizal, in Barangay San Jose.

== Architecture ==
The three-storey mansion's design was inspired by the Neo-Castilian style of architecture. It has a terra-cotta roof which makes the mansion one of the three remaining structures in Pasig that uses the material. Its interior was designed in an ornate revivalist style fashionable during the pre-war era. Fifteenth-century wooden flooring, which originally came from the old Pasig Cathedral were used in the mansion and remained intact until now. There were marble flooring and stairs as well. It has an azotea, where one can see the Pasig Cathedral, facing the mansion.

== History ==
=== Family history ===
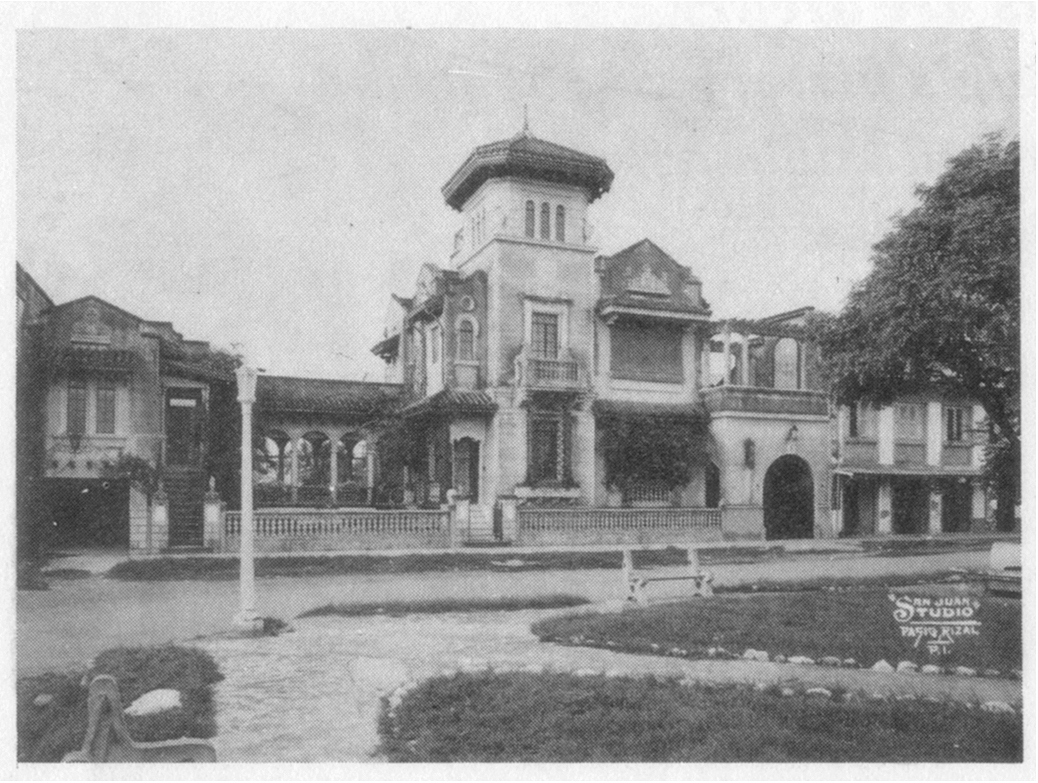
Photo of the Mansion during the 1950s

Before the mansion was completed, the former mayor's wife died. The couple had three children: Cristino, who had two children; Cristina, who died at an early age; and Jose who married "Naning" but had no children. Cristino's children were Cristino II and Vina Concepcion who married Luis Gonzales.

When siblings Cristino II and Vina died, the childless couple Dr. Jose Concepcion and "Naning" were the last heirs of the mansion. The mansion was bought in the 1980s by the municipal government of Pasig under the administration of Mayor Emiliano Caruncho. It was transformed into the Pasig Library and Museum.

=== Significant events ===
==== Commonwealth era ====
During the early Commonwealth period, President Manuel L. Quezon visited the Concepcion mansion to drink pure carabao milk and had some non-political conversations with Don Concepcion. Later that evening, the former mayor and his men became President Quezon's followers.

==== World War II ====
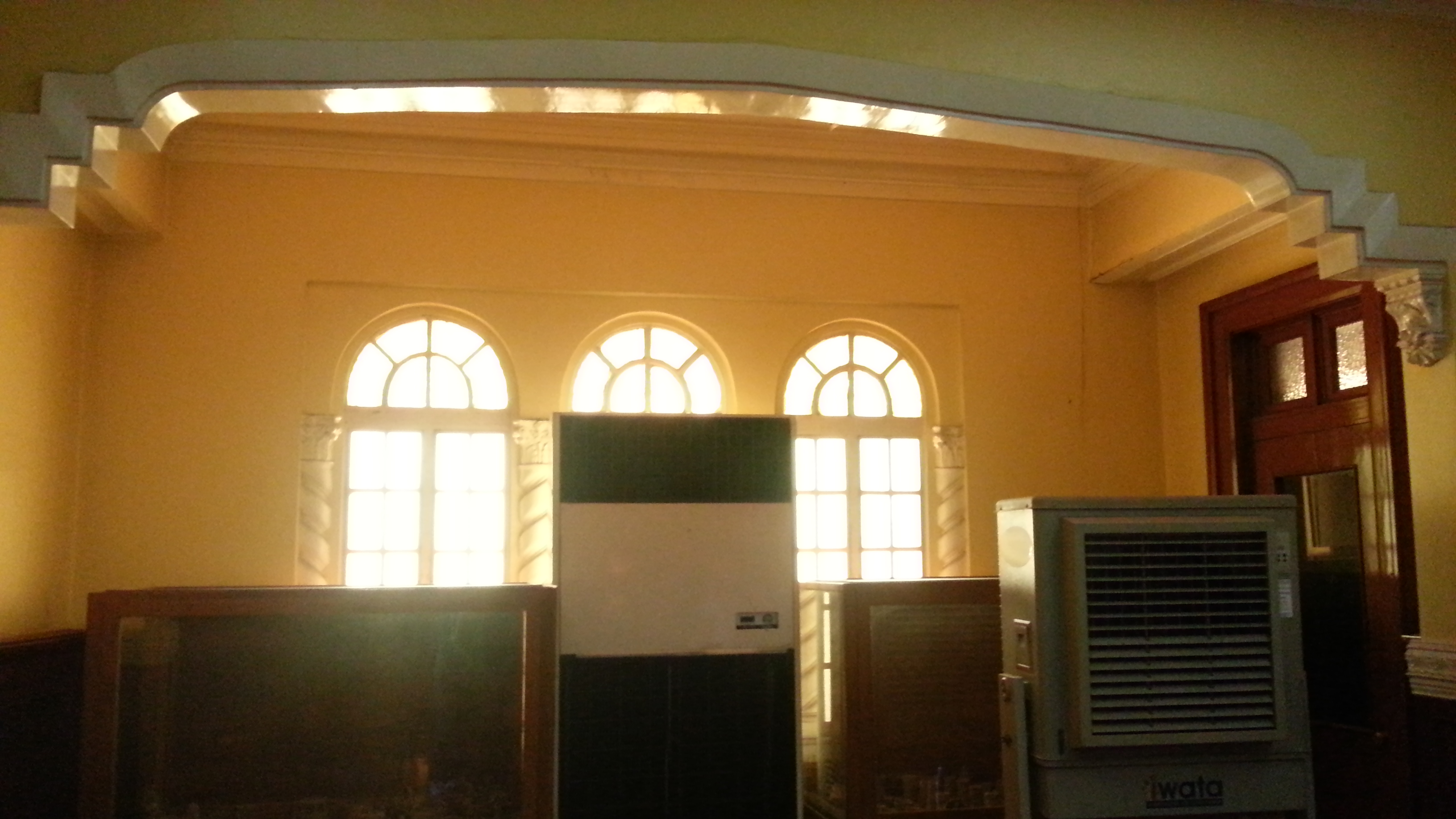
The place where the American flag was hoisted

During World War II, the mansion was used by the Japanese as their headquarters and detention center. On February 19, 1945, the American flag was raised at the veranda below the tower of the mansion to signify the liberation of Pasig from the Japanese forces.

== Renovations ==
The Concepcion Mansion was renovated and inaugurated as the Pasig City Museum in 2001 and has been a venue for exhibits, presentations, musical performances, art workshops and book launchings.

In 2008, another renovation was done on the interiors to transform it into a full-blown museum. Some of the antique furniture still remains. The garden was transformed to a hall where presentations and workshops are held.

== Gallery ==
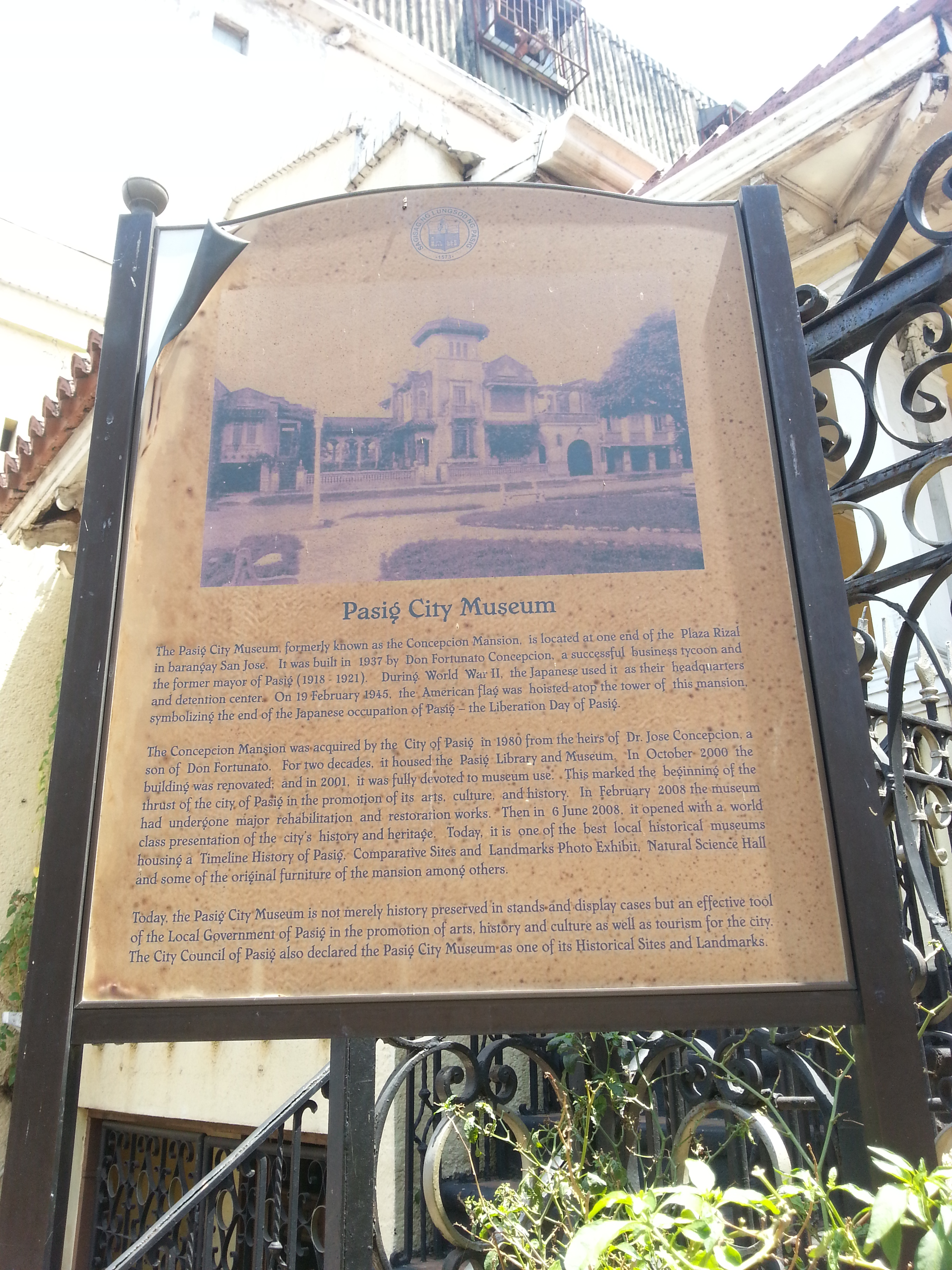
History of the Museum

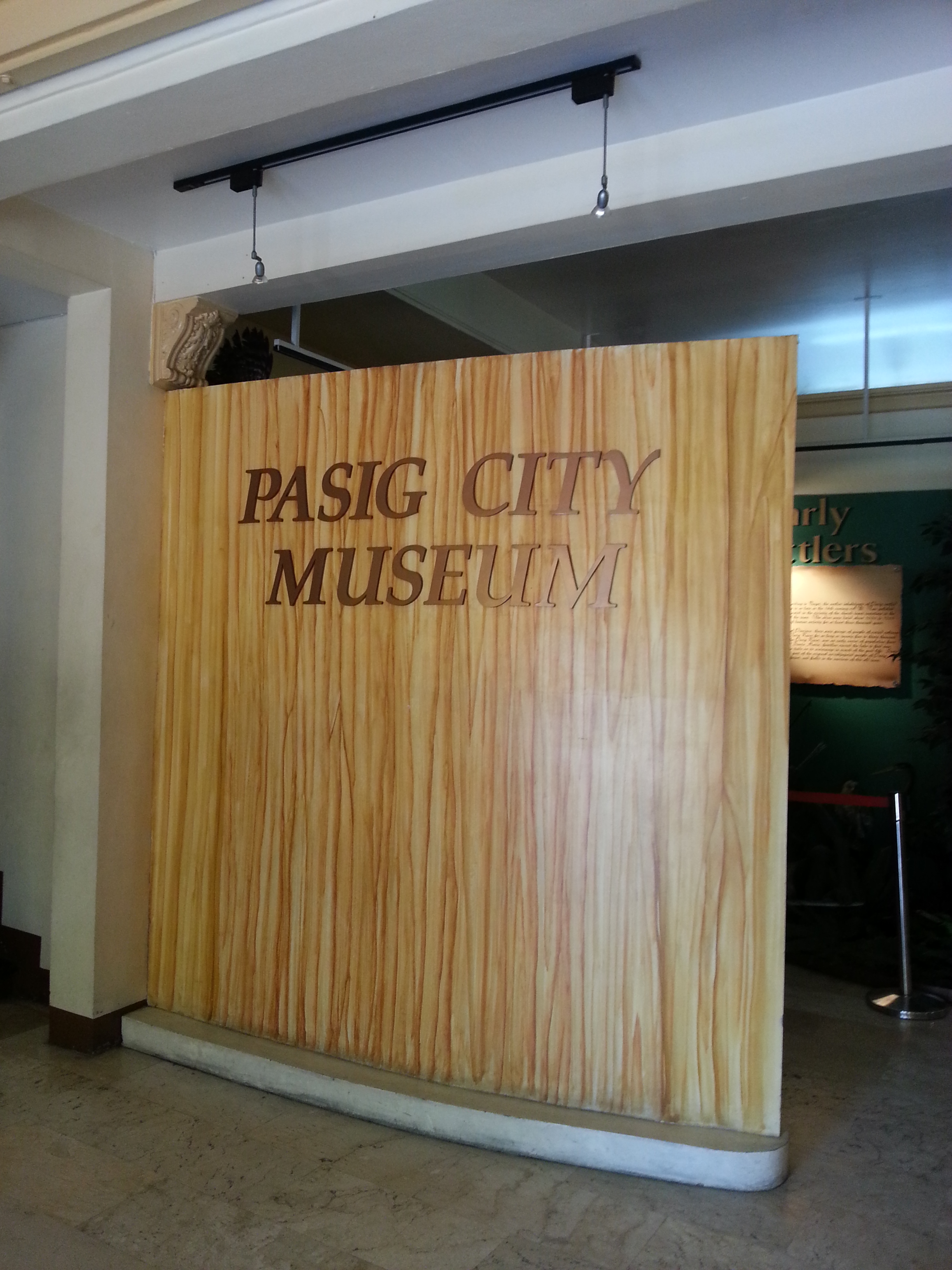
Lobby

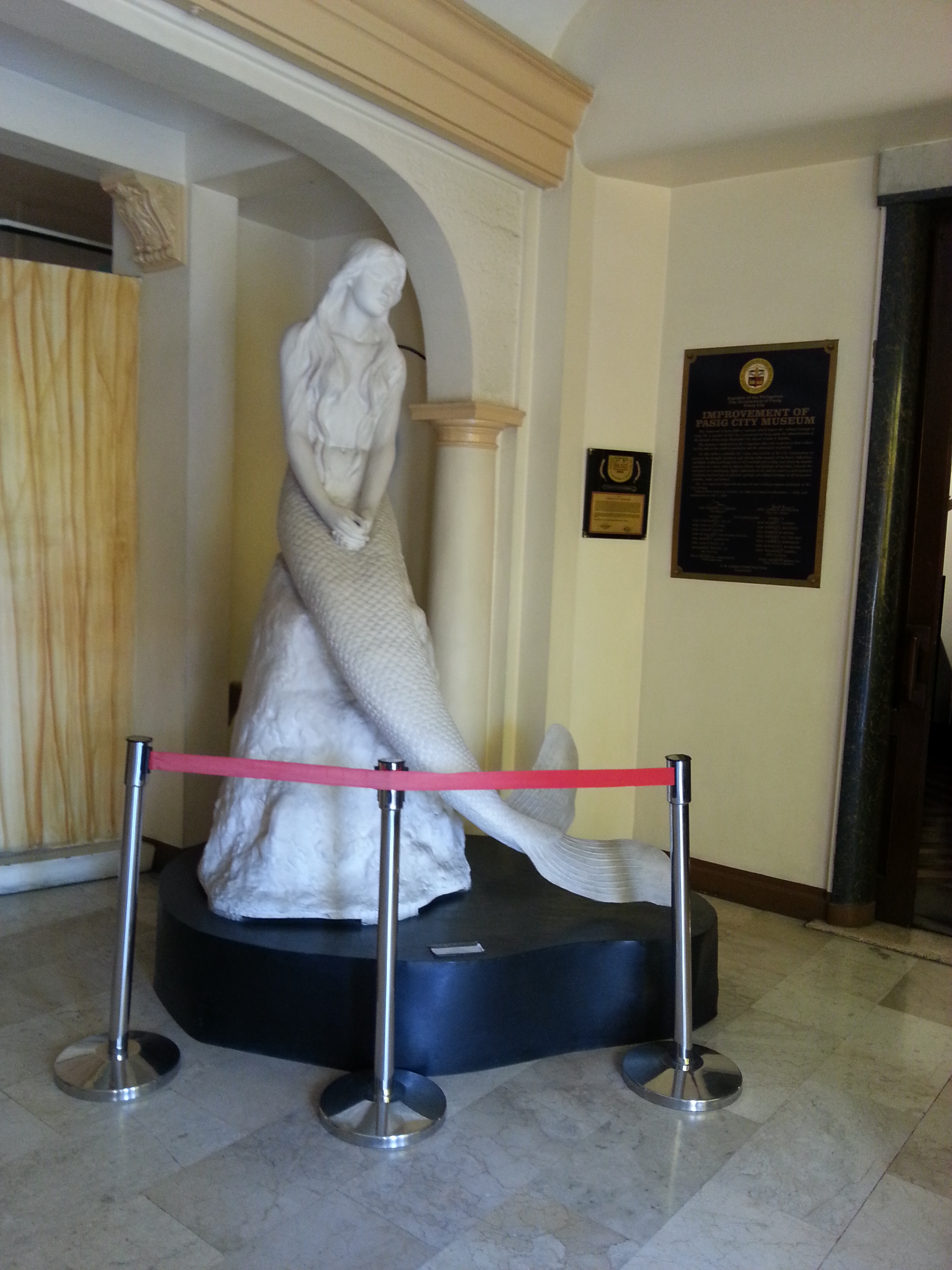
Mermaid Statue

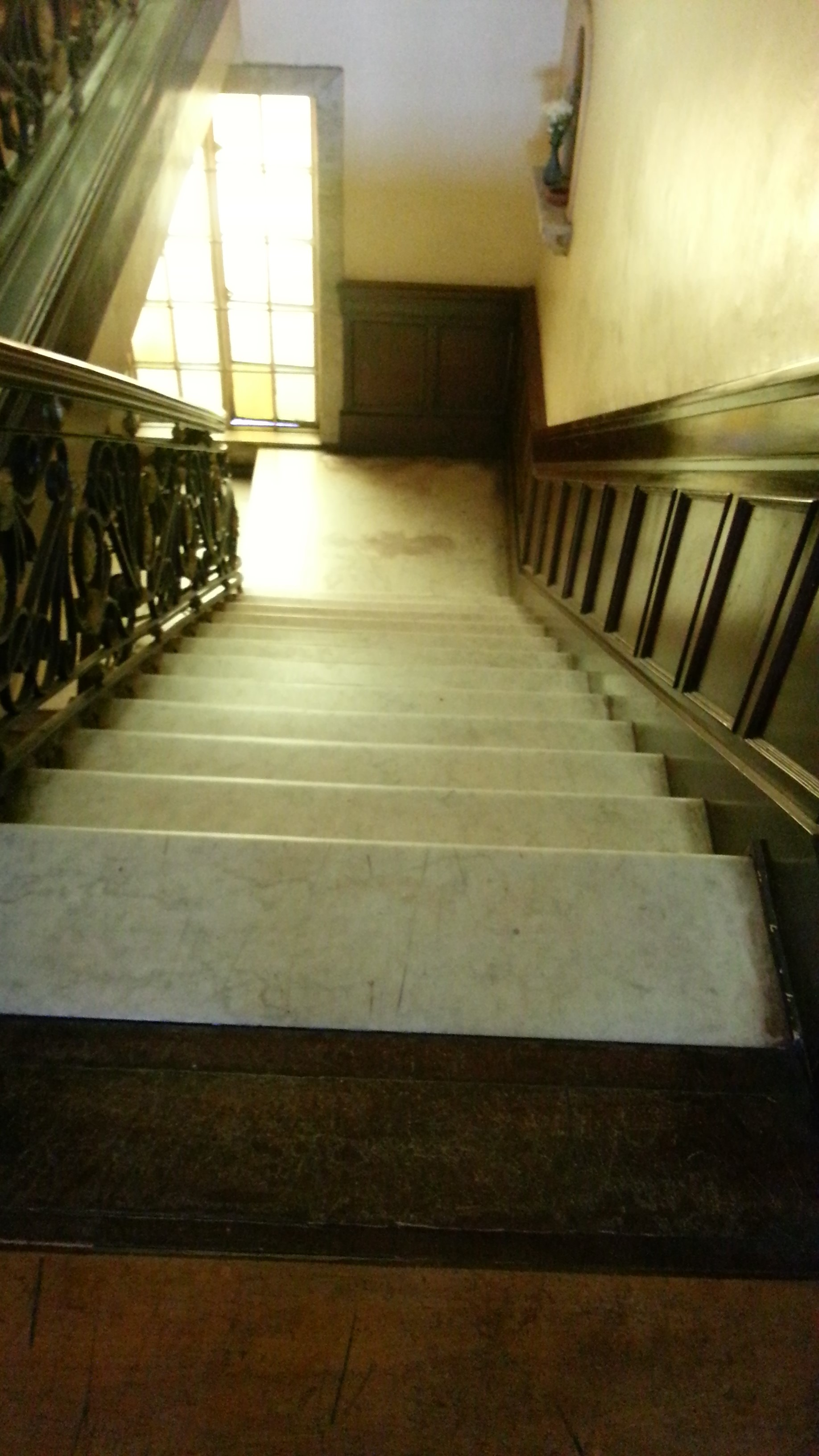
Marble Stairs

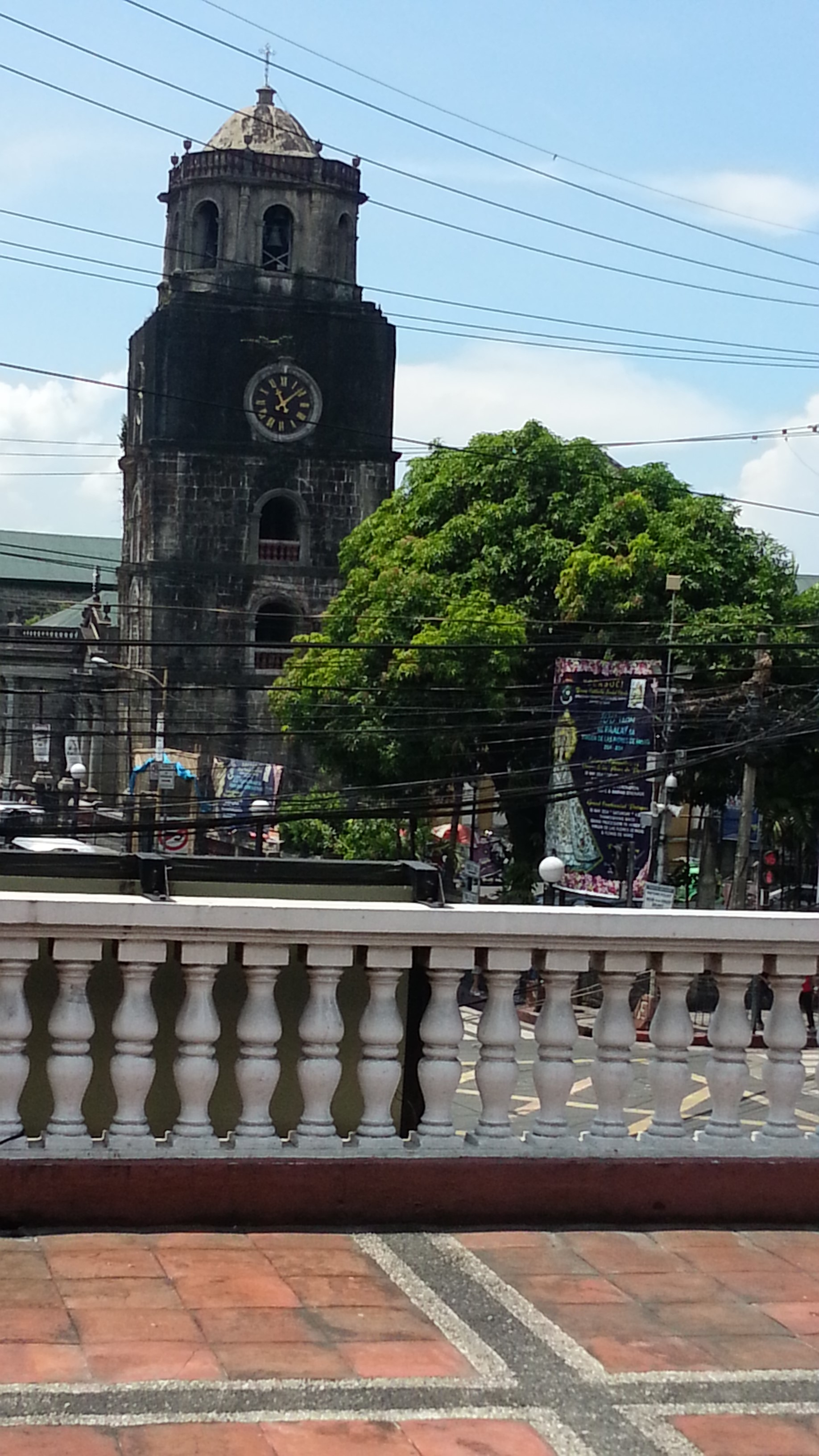
View from the Azotea
