= Worms City Museum =

Coordinates: 49.6281°N 8.3572°E

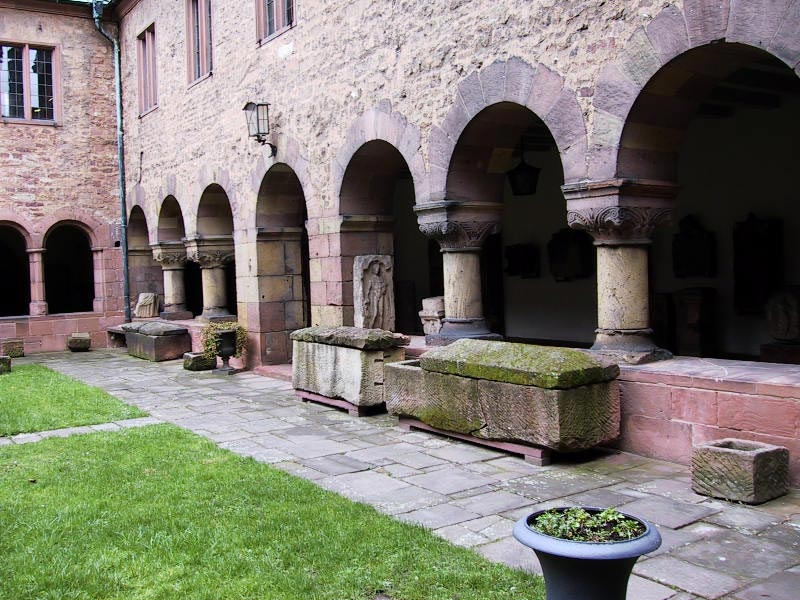
The lapidarium of the museum.

Worms City Museum (German - Museum der Stadt Worms or Stadtmuseum Worms) is a city museum in Worms, Germany, housed in the former Andreasstift complex. Its lapidarium is housed in the former cloister.
