= Toyota City Museum =

Museum in Toyota, Aichi, Japan

- 豊田市博物館
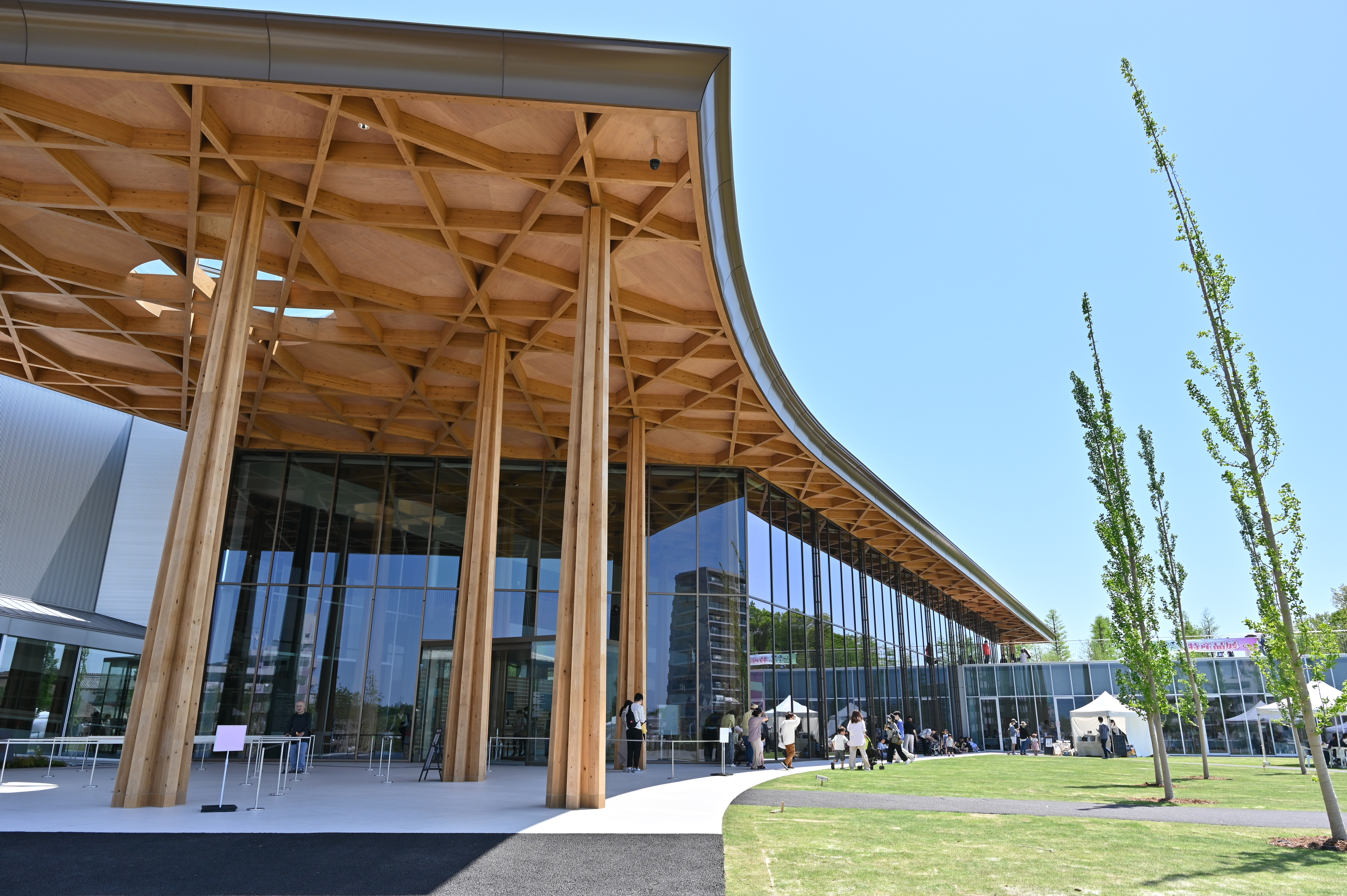
- Interactive map of the Toyota City Museum area

General information
- Location: 5-80 Kozaka-honmachi, Toyota, Aichi Prefecture, Japan
- Coordinates: 35°04′54″N 137°09′07″E
- Opened: 26 April 2024

Design and construction
- Architect: Shigeru Ban

Website
- Official website (ja)

Toyota City Museum (豊田市博物館, Toyota-shi Hakubutsukan) opened in Toyota, Aichi Prefecture, Japan in 2024. The museum supersedes and replaces the former Toyota City Museum of Local History, which opened in 1967 and closed in 2022. Located next to Toyota Municipal Museum of Art in the grounds of the former Shichishū Castle, the museum was designed by architect Shigeru Ban, Peter Walker designing the gardens of both museums. The collection and permanent displays relate to the natural and human history of the area and special exhibitions are also put on.

== See also ==
- Former Ryūshō-in Gardens
- Maiki temple ruins
- Ogyū Castle
