= Haddebyer Noor =

Lake in Schleswig-Holstein, Germany

- Haddeby Nor / Hedeby Nor
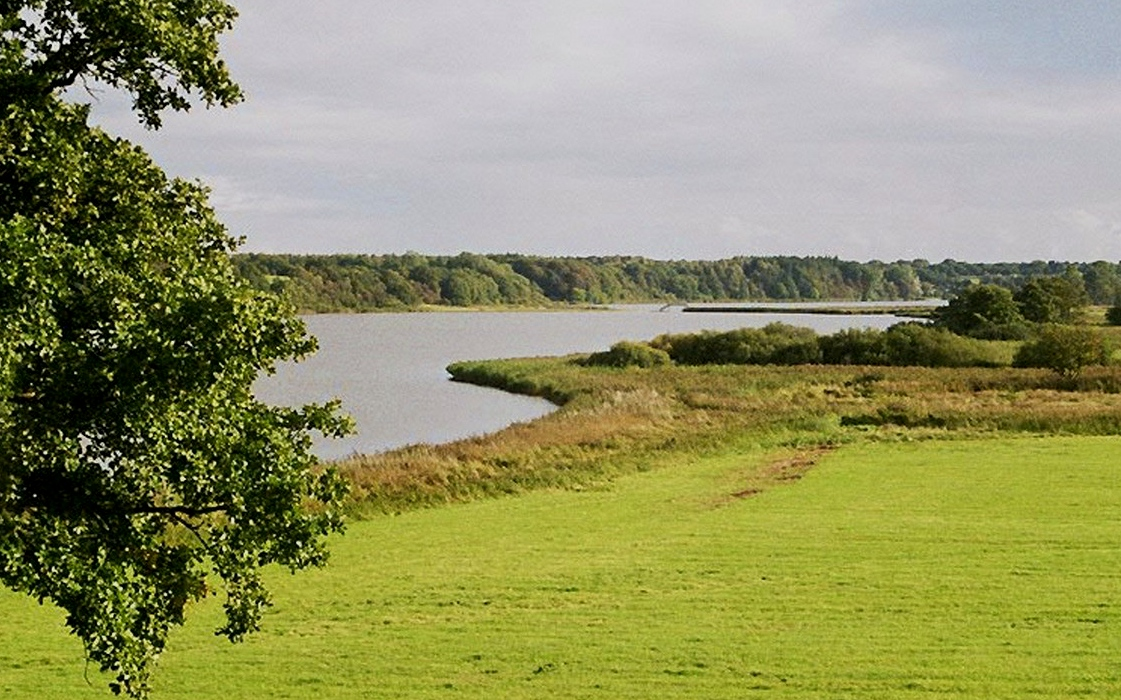

- Location within Schleswig-Holstein
- Location: Schleswig-Holstein
- Coordinates: 54°29′36″N 09°34′28″E
- Primary inflows: Selker Noor
- Primary outflows: Schlei
- Catchment area: 36.2 km^{2} (14.0 sq mi)
- Basin countries: Germany
- Max. length: 1.6 km (0.99 mi)
- Max. width: 0.9 km (0.56 mi)
- Surface area: 1 km^{2} (0.39 sq mi)
- Average depth: 3 m (9.8 ft)
- Max. depth: 5.2 m (17 ft)
- Water volume: 2,951,000 m^{3} (104,200,000 cu ft)
- Shore length^{1}: 4.8 km (3.0 mi)
- Surface elevation: 0 m (0 ft)
- ^{1} Shore length is not a well-defined measure.

Haddebyer Noor (Danish: Haddeby Nor or Hedeby Nor) is a lake – formerly a small arm of the Schlei inlet of the Baltic Sea – in Schleswig-Holstein, Germany. At an elevation of 0 m (0 ft), its surface area is one km^{2} (0.39 sq mi).
