= Dhaka City Museum =

Museum in Dhaka, Bangladesh

- ঢাকা নগর জাদুঘর
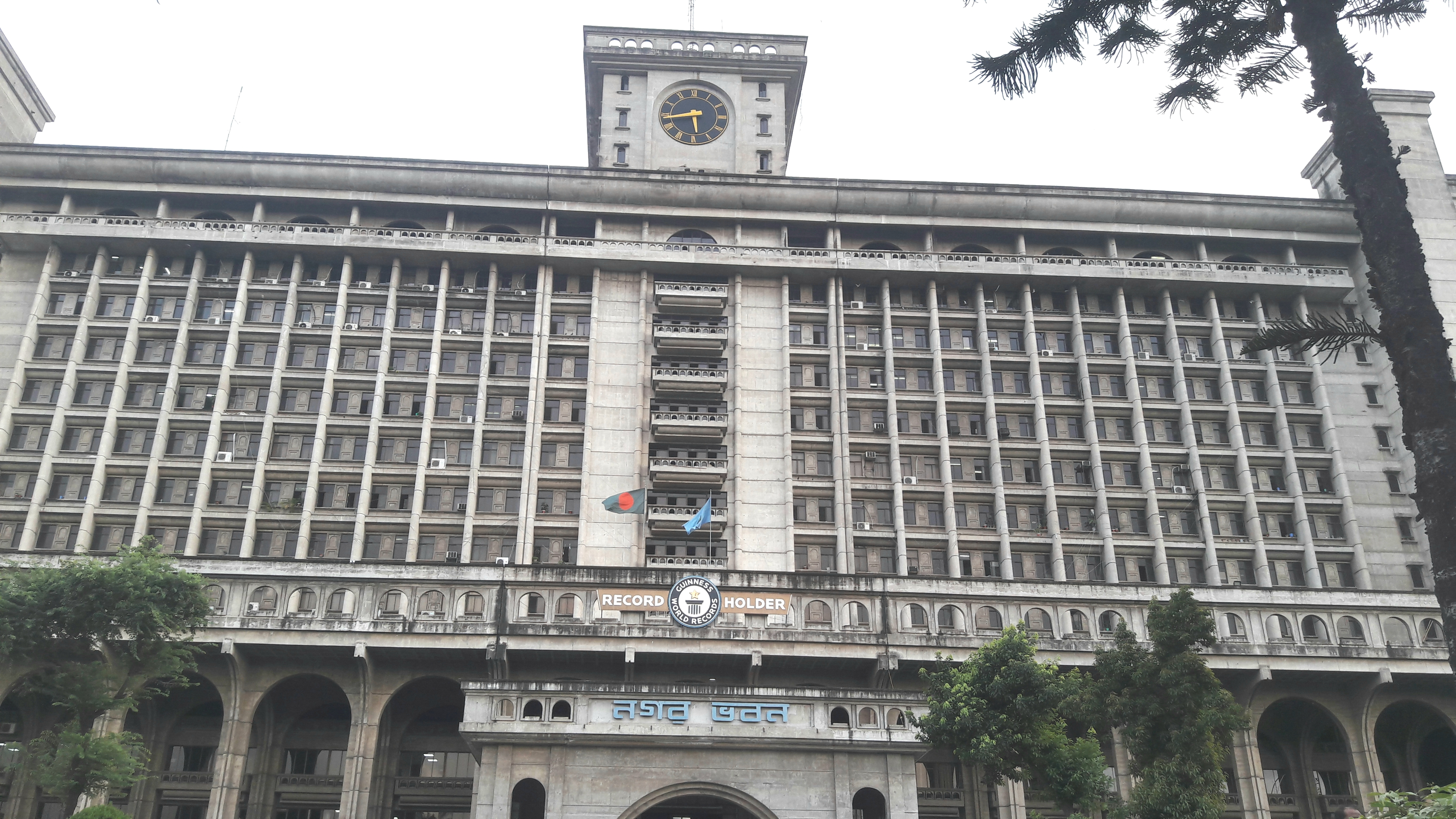
- Established: 20 June 1987; 39 years ago
- Location: Nagar Bhaban, Dhaka, Bangladesh
- Coordinates: 23.7239°N 90.4085°E
- Visitors: c. 1,456 per year

Dhaka City Museum is a local museum, situated in Nagar Bhaban, Dhaka. This museum was established in 1987 to present the history of Dhaka city to the public, which later became government ownership in 1996.

== History ==
Muntassir Mamoon was the main patron of this museum. He established the museum on 20 June 1987 in Panch Bhai Lane of Old Dhaka with Sirajul Islam, Nazrul Islam, Rabiul Hossain and Hashem Khan under private ownership. Later, on 20 July 1996, the ownership of the museum passed to the former Dhaka City Corporation and the Dhaka City Museum became a government antiquarian institution. After the change of ownership, the museum was moved to the headquarters of the present Dhaka South City Corporation named Nagar Bhaban. The museum was originally brought into government ownership as a result of the interest of the then mayor of Dhaka, Mohammad Hanif. However, after the relocation, the museum's location shifted to the government office, so it failed to attract visitors, thereby defeating the purpose of informing the city's history. According to a report published in 2018 by Kaler Kantho, the average number of visitors to the museum is only four. The reason for this is that since 1996, the number of visitors has not been increased due to the non-development of the museum and the non-increase in the number of collections.

== Future plan ==
It is planned to shift the Dhaka City Museum to the third floor of the Rose Garden Palace. The museum will be shifted after completion of the Rose Garden Palace renovation in December 2023.

== Exhibition ==
The museum has a gallery where historical photographs of Dhaka city are displayed. Various objects, documents and materials related to various historical events of Dhaka city are on display in this museum. It has collection of historical newspapers of the city.

== Publications ==
Various papers, books and research papers related to the history of Dhaka city have been published from the museum.
