= Melone =

Melone may refer to the following:

== Places ==
- Cà Melone, Borgo Maggiore, San Marino
- Melone, Guardiagrele, Abruzzo, Italy
- Miller-Melone Ranch, Saratoga, California, U.S.

== People with the surname Melone ==
- Altobello Melone (1490/91–1543), Italian painter
- Drury Melone (1833–1903), American politician
- Harry R. Melone Jr. (1928–2009), American diplomat
- Mary Melone (born 1964), Italian religious sister and theologian
- Suzanne Casale Melone (born 1979), known as Lil Suzy, American singer
- Victoire-Melone Geayant (fl. 1749–58), French actress

== Other ==
- Gelo di melone, a Sicilian dessert

== See also ==
- Melones (disambiguation)
- Meloni
