= Museo diocesano di Lanciano =

Religious art museum in Lanciano, Abruzzo, Italy

Coordinates: 42.2296°N 14.3867°E

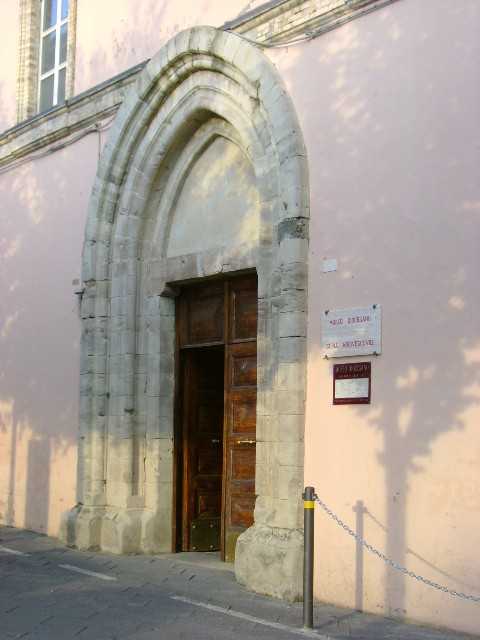
- Museo diocesano di Lanciano

- Location within Abruzzo
- Location: Lanciano
- Type: Religious art
- Website: http://www.museodiocesanolanciano.it/

Museo diocesano di Lanciano (Italian for Diocesan Museum of Lanciano) is a museum of religious art in Lanciano, Province of Chieti (Abruzzo).

== History ==
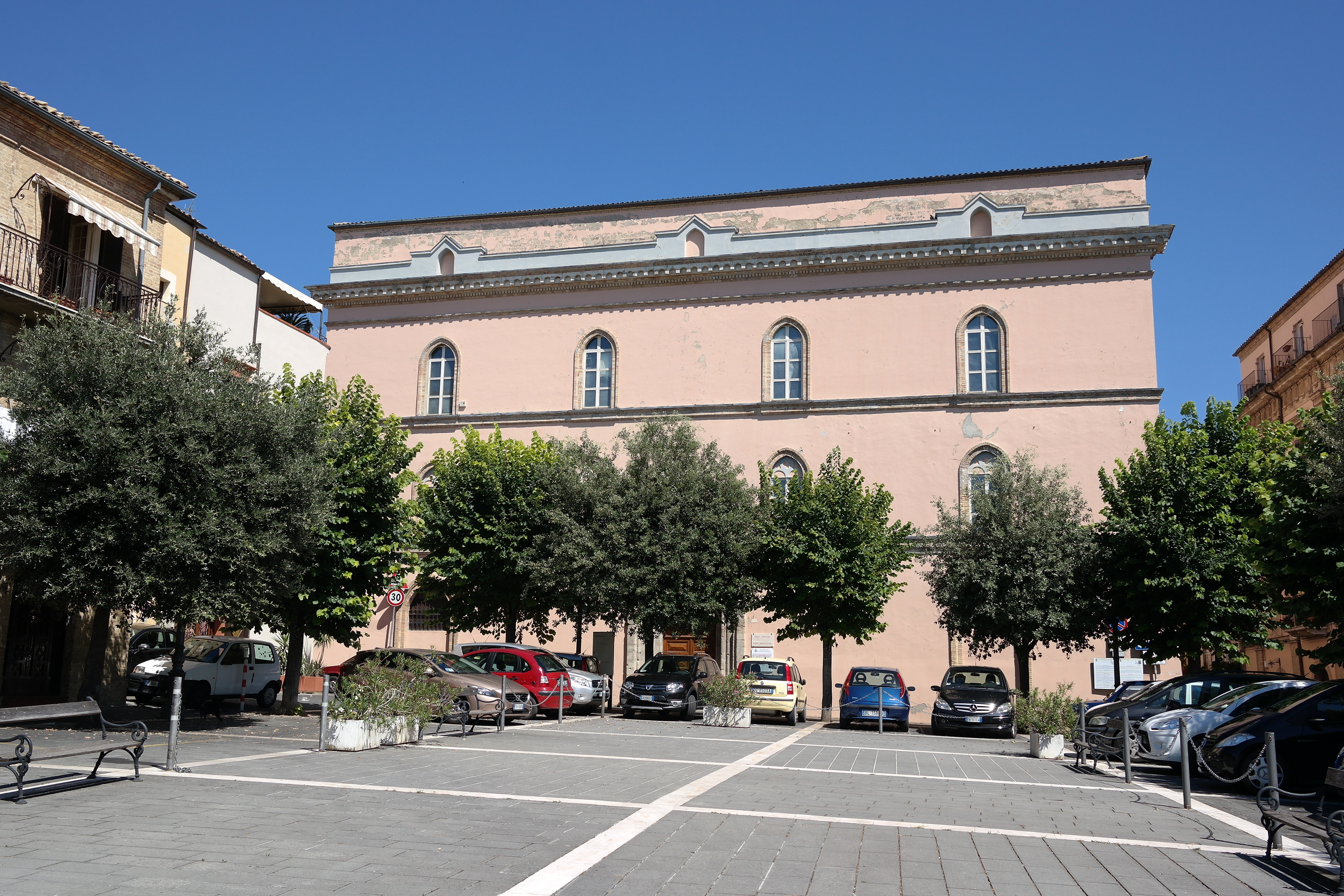
Largo dell'Appello and the exterior of the palace

Opened to the public in 2002 by Monsignor Carlo Ghidelli, the museum is the result of meticulous research into ancient works, curated by Monsignor Enzio d'Antonio, at the archbishop's residence and various churches in Lanciano, some of which have been deconsecrated for centuries.

The museum is located inside the Palazzo del Seminario, a 17th-century building that houses the offices of the Curia, the Library, and the Diocesan Historical Archive. It is divided into nine rooms according to an innovative thematic arrangement and contains a notable collection of artworks, the result of painstaking restoration work, related to Christian worship and dating from the 13th to the 19th century.

The palace was built as the seat of the Frentana diocese in the 16th century (established in 1515, separating from that of Chieti), and housed the seminary until the 1960s. Today it is home to the Diocesan Museum of Lanciano. The construction likely began in 1590, the year the old episcopal residence at the Cathedral was abandoned to build the Hospital of Santa Maria della Sanità. The building has a complex layout resulting from the amalgamation of pre-existing houses. In 1819, the portal of the old Church of the Annunziata in Piazza Plebiscito, demolished by Eugenio Michitelli to create the neoclassical facade of the Cathedral, was mounted on the main facade. The 15th-century portal features a pointed arch, and the neo-Gothic elements of the facade (the windows) were created as part of a revival, while the second lateral portal is typically Baroque.

The facade has a three-level structure, plus an attic, defined by brick cornices that mark the imposts of the openings. On the ground floor, there are three portals, of which the lateral ones, with jambs and pointed arches in brick, are currently bricked up. The main entrance is in the center, featuring the 15th-century portal.

The palace has two entrances: the one on Via Garibaldi from the square, with a 14th-century portal, and the one on Via G. Finamore, in Baroque style with a broken pediment. In the atrium is the Chapel of San Gaetano, and via a flight of stairs, it is possible to access the first floor, which houses various offices, the second floor, home to the museum, and the third floor, with the bishop's offices, some Lanciano prelates, and the small seminary school, affiliated with the Pontifical Abruzzese-Molisano "San Pio X" Seminary in Chieti.

In 2018, restoration work began on the facade and some interior rooms at risk of rainwater infiltration.

== Collection ==
Marian devotion is particularly strong among the people of Lanciano, as evidenced by countless ex-votos, paintings, and gold and precious stone jewelry donated to the Madonna del Ponte, the city's protector, all dating from the 17th to the 20th century. The first two rooms are dedicated to the veneration of the Madonna, containing, in addition to the ex-votos, wooden statues from the 14th and 15th centuries.

In approximately one thousand square meters of exhibition space, significant artifacts spanning centuries of the history of the Frentana Church are displayed: paintings, sculptures, goldsmithing, sacred vestments, ex-votos, wooden furnishings, embroideries, manuscripts, and precious bindings. These objects, dating from the 13th to the 20th centuries, primarily come from the Cathedral, various churches of the Diocese, and the Archbishop's Palace. The core of the collection is notably rich in goldsmith works, featuring masterpieces such as the 15th-century processional cross by Nicola da Guardiagrele and workshop, the almost contemporaneous pastoral staff of the Sulmonese school, and the pontifical jug, marked 1603, probably of Neapolitan manufacture.

The textile section is also significant: notable are the rich 19th-century liturgical vestments belonging to Archbishop Francesco Maria de' Luca, and the extraordinary large ensemble from the mid-18th century, painted in tempera and embroidered, donated by the same prelate to the Cathedral. Among the paintings, noteworthy are the early 16th-century Christ Carrying the Cross by a Giorgionesque painter, the Madonna and Child signed by Iacovo de Lanziano, an artist who likely stayed in 15th-century Venice, and the late 18th-century model by Giacinto Diana for the lost fresco decoration of the Cathedral's dome. Among the sculptures, significant pieces include a Madonna and Child of the late 13th - early 14th-century Abruzzese school, and another Madonna, also originally with the Divine Infant, attributed to an Abruzzese master of the early 15th century.

=== Room 1: Treasure of the Madonna del Ponte ===
The first room of the Diocesan Museum, located in the Archbishop's Palace (Largo dell'Appello), houses the economic and artistic heritage created in honor of the Virgin, transferred to the museum for safety reasons, especially after the damage to the cathedral caused by the Val di Comino earthquake in 1984. The core of the oldest jewels comprises pieces from the 17th-18th centuries of the Neapolitan school, followed by later works, such as the ex-voto paintings from the 19th century, created in honor of the Madonna to commemorate miraculous events.

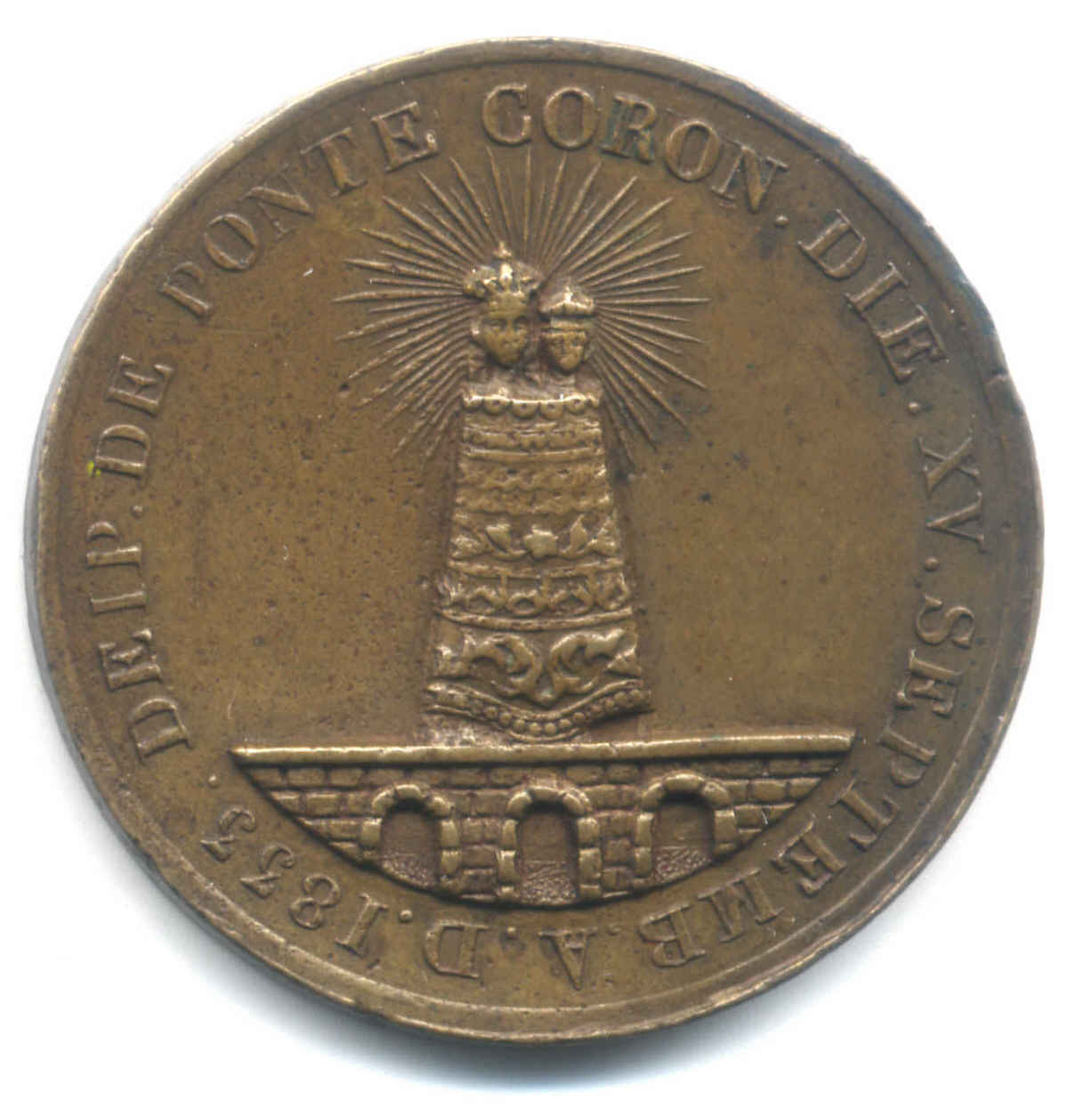
Commemorative medal of the Madonna del Ponte

The oldest jewel in the collection is a 1601 pendant in gilded silver, with a large rock crystal flanked by 4 rubies mounted en cabochon. The pendant was likely completed with some pearls, possibly a gift from the Marchioness of Ugni of Guardiagrele. Other examples of these objects are found in the work "Sant'Apollonia" by Francesco Maria Renzetti (mid-18th century), featuring two very similar elements adorning the chest and head. A more substantial number of 18th-century objects include bodice ornaments, three fine ruby ornaments mounted on a light arabesque lattice. A typically 18th-century jewel for fastening bodice laces: the pendant consists of a large bow or butterfly supporting a drop pendant, to which a third cruciform piece is suspended.

Another notable piece belongs to the treasure of Santa Maria Maggiore, while similar examples are also found in the Victoria and Albert Museum collection in London, with 15 elements of German craftsmanship. The emerald bodice clasp is the result of assembling two "girandole" earrings, consisting of a central element with three drop pendants, to which further elements were added to form a highly elaborate whole. This type belongs to the early 18th century. Other items in the treasure collection include typical liturgical vestments such as reliquaries, chalices, and host boxes.

Notable works include:

- Sketch of the Coronation of the Madonna by Giacinto Diano (1788)
- Reliquary of the Holy Thorn (16th century)
- Pontifical Jug (1603)
- Madonna and Child (14th century)
- Annunciation Group (14th century, from the demolished church of Santa Maria Annunziata)
- Annunciation (from the church of Sant'Agostino)
- Madonna and Child by Jacopo da Lanciano (14th century)

Along with the important collection of ex-voto jewels, two silk vestments are displayed, one from the 18th century and the other from the 19th century, used to dress the statues of the Patroness: the first, entirely embroidered in gold, bears the insignia of Giacomo Lieto of the Dukes of Polignano, Archbishop of Lanciano from 1754 to 1769, who in 1758 had a new marble altar made at the cathedral, executed by the Neapolitan Crescenzio Trinchese based on a design by Gennaro Campanile, influenced by Ferdinando Sanfelice.

The vestment, intended to cover the terracotta statue modeled after the Lauretana, is datable to those years. The second vestment is from the mid-19th century, covering the mannequin statue used for processions, and remained in use until the creation of the new statue in 1933, on the occasion of the centenary of the Coronation of the Madonna del Ponte.

Of interest, besides some 15th-century statues of the Madonna and Child, quite damaged and worn from being locked in the Cathedral's basements for years, is a painting of the Madonna and Child by an unknown Jacopo da Lanciano, from the 14th century. The small panel was located in the church of Santa Maria Maggiore, taken to L'Aquila to the Superintendent's office, and returned to Lanciano in 2002 upon the museum's opening. The painting, in tempera, depicts the first miracle of Jesus according to the Apocryphal Gospels, echoing from pseudo-Matthew the miracle of giving life and raising from the dead by blowing on birds he modeled from mud.

=== Room 2: Works by Pasquale Bellonio from the former church of Madonna degli Angeli ===
The theme of the veneration of the Virgin: all the paintings exhibited are by the Ortonese Pasquale Bellonio (1689-1786), very active in Lanciano. In the room is displayed the original Triptych of the Annunciation, Nativity, Assumption of Mary, from the former church of Madonna degli Angeli in via Cavour, now the Orthodox parish of Saints Sergio and Bacchus, which still houses copies of the canvases. The room also features two 16th-century gilded wooden candle-bearing lions from the church of Sant'Agostino.

The Annunciation and Assumption painting surrounded the main altar panel of the church, adjacent to the De Arcangelis palace.

=== Room 3: Various Works and the Chasuble from Largo San Giovanni ===
- Madonna del Latte (copy of Cranach)
- Holy Family, Neapolitan school
- Madonna of the Rosary between St. Philip Neri, Sebastian, and Martin by Francesco Maria Renzetti
- Pietà and Our Lady of Sorrows by Domenico Renzetti (1733)
- Pastoral staff of Monsignor Angelo Maccafani (1515)
- Madonna and Child between St. John and St. Nicholas by Polidoro da Lanciano (from the Church of St. Nicholas)

The theme of the veneration of the Virgin Mary with the Saints continues; most of the works come from the destroyed churches of St. Martin and St. Maurice, as well as the Chapel of Our Lady of Sorrows at the parish of Santa Lucia on Corso Roma. A Madonna of the Rosary with St. Philip Neri, St. Francis Xavier, St. Sebastian, and St. Martin of Tours from 1750 by Francesco Maria Renzetti of Lanciano (circa 1711-1751) comes from St. Martin. The two sculptures of the Pietà and the Our Lady of Sorrows (1733) are attributed to the workshop of his father, Domenico Renzetti (1679-1750). The statue was commissioned by the Confraternity of Mary Most Holy of Sorrows at Santa Lucia.

Renzetti was a student of sculptor Giacomo Colombo (1663-1731), whose works are present in Lanciano. The canvas of the Our Lady of Sorrows seems dependent on Colombo’s works, specifically the Madonna of Consolation from 1708 from Sant'Agostino for the Confraternity of Saints Simon and Jude Thaddeus, and the Madonna of Candlemas at the Church of San Biagio, for the Confraternity of the Recommended.

The seven medallions were originally placed on the main altar of the Confraternity of Our Lady of Sorrows chapel at the Church of Santa Lucia. These medallions depict prophecies concerning Jesus:

- First: Presentation of Jesus at the Temple under Simeon’s prophecy
- Second: Flight into Egypt of Joseph and Mary
- Third: Jesus among the Scholars at the Temple
- Fourth: Jesus on the way to Calvary, meeting with Mary
- Fifth: Mary at the foot of the Cross with the crucified Jesus
- Sixth: Deposition from the Cross
- Seventh: Burial in the tomb

Also of interest is a Madonna del Latte from the late 17th century, oil on canvas, by an anonymous artist, from the Church of Sant'Agostino. The painting was fervently worshipped and is a copy of a work by Cranach the Elder. The Madonna is depicted with loose hair, as was customary for women who were about to give birth. A drop pearl on her chest symbolizes the lactation.

Noteworthy in the room are a 13th-century silver pastoral staff from the Sulmona area of the Peligna goldsmiths, and a chasuble.

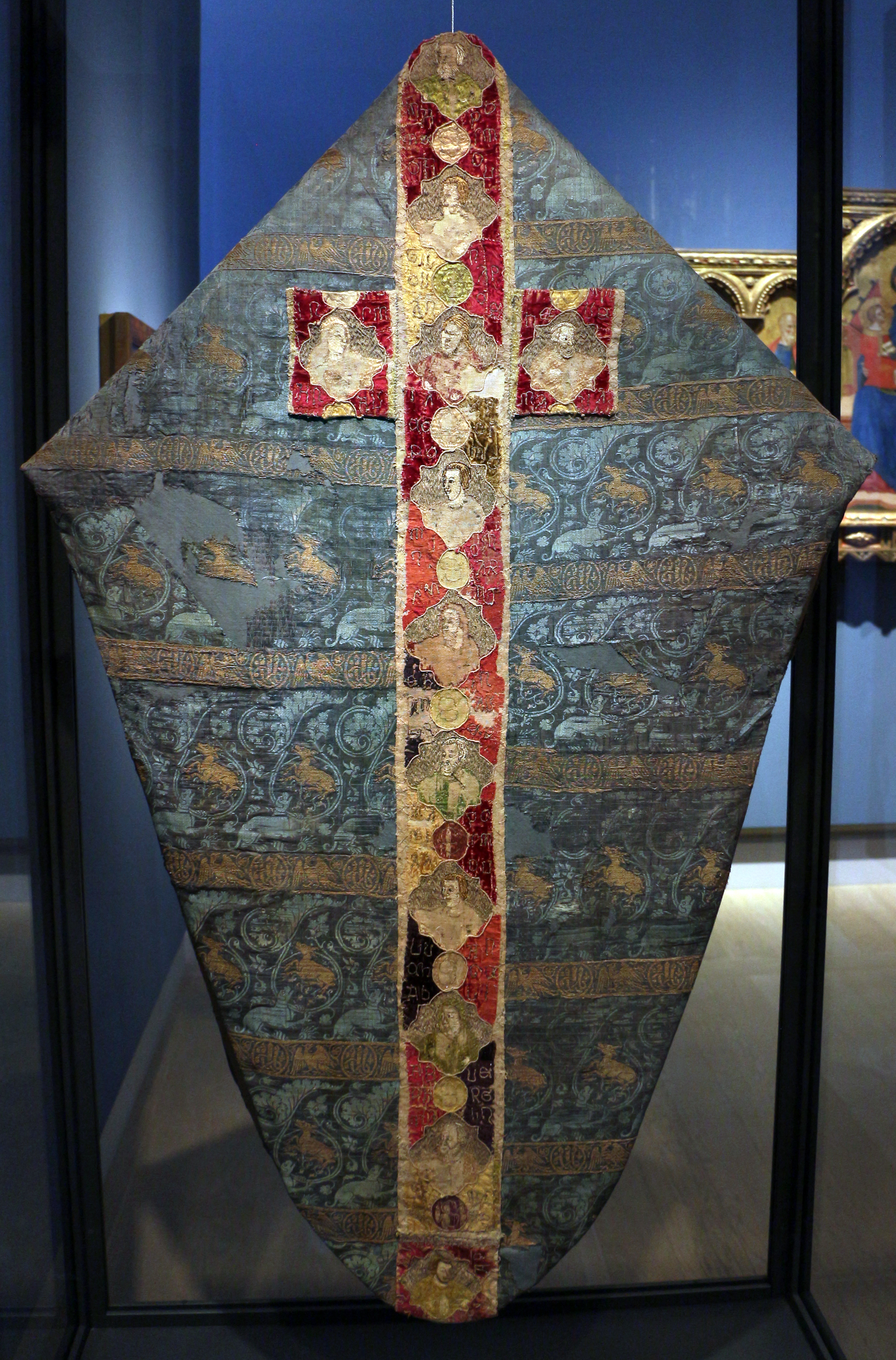
Chasuble from 1310

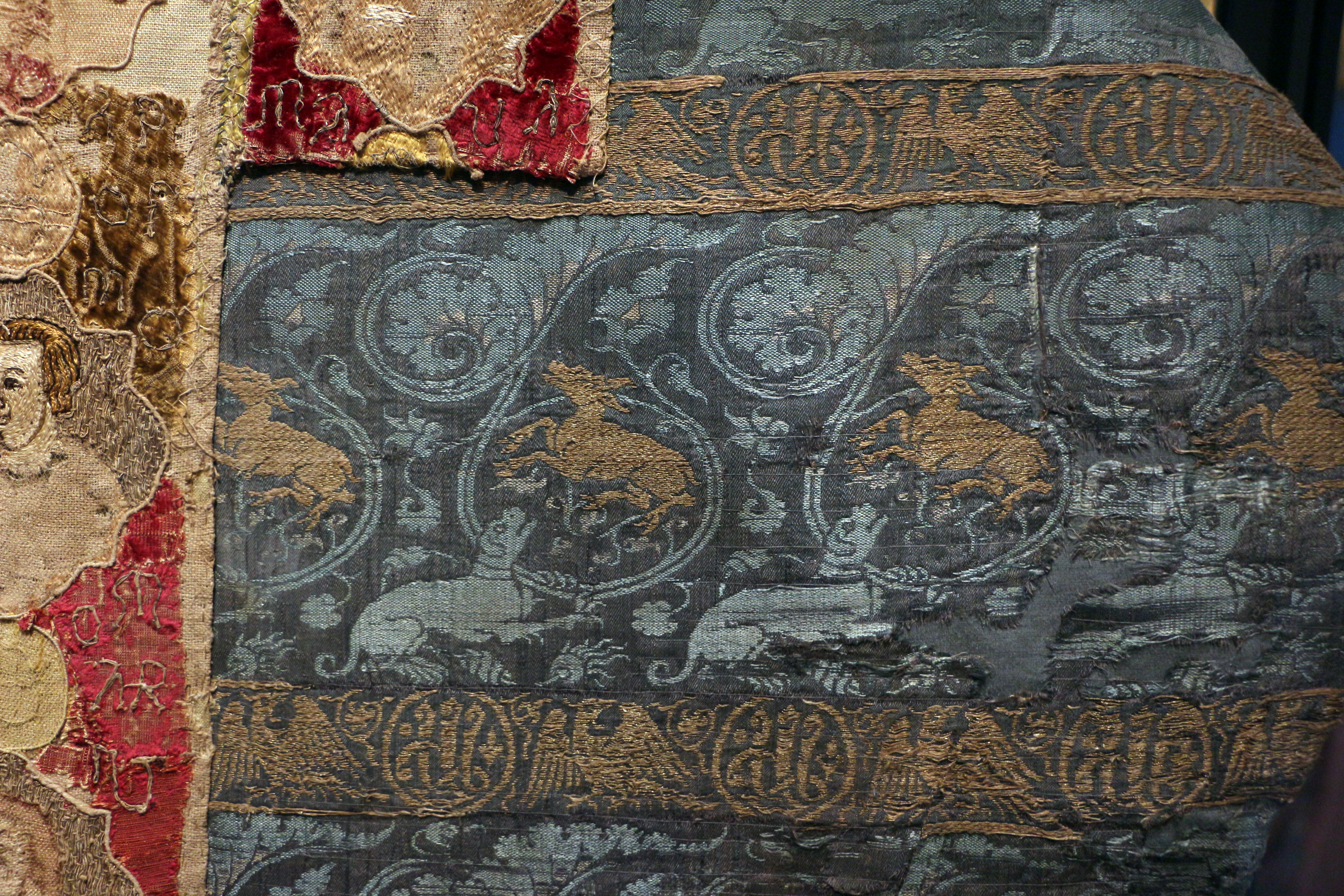
Detail of the chasuble

This precious medieval textile artifact was discovered entirely by chance in the Largo San Giovanni area during the 2013-14 restoration work on the bell tower of the church, which was destroyed by bombings in 1943.

The liturgical vestment identified as a "chasuble" is in the typical shape of the "Roman" planet, known in Italy since the Middle Ages, evolving from the "poenula" cloak, shorter on the sides, less majestic, and more practical. Made around the mid-15th century, the priestly garment uses older recycled textile materials, a sumptuous 14th-century fabric, and a figurative cross embroidery, retrieved from the dismantling of an altar frontal or from the edging of a cope, dating back to the first decade of the 15th century.

Of interest is the lampas with two thrown wefts, brocaded, in light blue and yellow, originally a secular fabric for a high-ranking client. The decorative motif features horizontal bars with an acanthus vine bending into two sinuous spirals in the main frieze. In the lower frieze, a gold-topped fawn tries to break free from the bushes entangling its antlers, while a hunting dog is about to grab it. The smaller lower frieze is adorned with calligraphic discs alternating with a bird of prey identified as a falcon. On the back of the garment is the figurative cross, made up of a long strip, where 12 busts of saints, apostles, and prophets are embroidered in chain stitch with membranous gold and polychrome silks in frames.

The history of this chasuble is still not fully reconstructed. An inventory of the Church of St. John the Baptist from 1600 does not mention the vestment, possibly because it was out of fashion by the 17th century. The chasuble was restored by Tiziana Benzi of the Textile Restoration and Conservation Studio in Piacenza, under the direction of Lucia Arbace.

=== Room 4: Fresco of St. Maurus and Paintings from the Church of St. Nicholas ===
- Christ Carrying the Cross (16th century) from the Church of Santa Maria Maggiore
- Medieval fresco from the destroyed Church of St. Maurus: Crucifixion
- Lamentation of the Dead Christ by Diomede (1731)

This room is dedicated to the figure of Christ, particularly the significance of Redemption through his sacrifice on the cross. On the right side is the most artistically significant work, Christ Carrying the Cross. Notable pieces include the processional cross by Giovannangelo Scognamiglio from 1703, made of silver embossed, engraved, and chiseled, from Santa Maria Maggiore, and two paintings from 1731: Lamentation of the Angels over the Dead Christ - Our Lady of Sorrows, copies of De Mura, from the Church of St. Nicholas.

The Christ Carrying the Cross from 1500-10, oil on panel, is inspired by the works of Giorgione and comes from Santa Maria Maggiore. It was commissioned by a patron who had it placed on one of the church's main altars. The stylistic type of the work oscillates between the works of Bellini and Giorgione.

The Crucifixion fresco from the 15th century was detached from the wall of the former Church of St. Maurus of the Carmelite Fathers (the current Imperial Gallery building on Viale De Crecchio) before its demolition in the 1930s for the construction of the former Imperial Cinema. It was detached by students of the Giuseppe Palizzi Art Institute of Lanciano. Noteworthy is the contemporary landscape depicted in the fresco, which corresponds to that of Lanciano.

The 19th-century Our Lady of Sorrows, made of carved and painted wood with papier-mâché and fabric, comes from the Cathedral of Santa Maria del Ponte. It is one of the various dressed statues of Lancianese churches, objects of particular devotional practices, especially among women, which ranged from the meticulous creation of clothing to the dressing ceremonies before processional outings.

=== Room 5: Large Collection of Processional Crosses, Liturgical Vestments, and Neapolitan Nativity Scenes ===
- Painting of Saint Bartholomew, from the namesake convent, by Giovan Battista Spinelli (1653)
- Miracle of the Profaned Host from the Church of Sant'Agostino
- Various reliquaries from the 14th century from the Church of Santa Maria Maggiore (one by Nicola da Guardiagrele)
- Busts of Saints Leonard, Mark, and Luke from the oratory of the Church of Santa Lucia (16th century)
- Sculpture of Saint Joseph, donated by the Stella family

The sixth room is dedicated to the Veneration of the Saints and mostly preserves works from the disappeared churches of the Lanciano Vecchio neighborhood (San Martino, San Lorenzo, San Maurizio), including a statue of Saint Lawrence from the 15th century, a statue of Saint John from the Church of La Candelora in Largo San Giovanni (14th century), and the altarpiece of Saint Maurice from the 17th century. From the oratory of the Addolorata in Santa Lucia come the busts of the Evangelists Mark and Luke, dated 1778, along with two oval paintings of Saint Joseph and Saint Francis of Paola.

In the entrance showcase, there are liturgical objects, chalices, pyxes, and processional crosses from the 14th to 19th centuries. As you exit the room, you find an altarpiece of the Miracle of the Profaned Host, from the Church of Sant'Agostino, which refers to the profanation of the host by Ricciarella. In 1273, following the advice of a Jewish witch, she prepared a love potion for her husband. The site of the profanation is now occupied by the Chapel of Santa Croce on Via dei Frentani.

There are various Neapolitan chalices from the 17th to 19th centuries, made of cast, embossed, chiseled, engraved, and gilded silver, from various Lanciano and non-local churches. They are displayed chronologically from left to right and from top to bottom, allowing the stylistic evolution of these vestments to be reconstructed. The Neapolitan pyxes are from the 16th to 18th centuries, made of cast and embossed silver. The oldest one comes from the Church of San Lorenzo, created by silversmith Ciucci in 1579, with stamps referencing the most renowned Neapolitan silversmiths.

There is also a reliquary monstrance from the workshop of Nicola da Guardiagrele, from the 15th century with later interventions, made of cast, embossed, chiseled, pierced, and gilded silver with enamels, from the Church of Sant'Agostino. This singularly precious monstrance is the oldest among those exhibited in the museum and showcases the excellence of the Abruzzese goldsmith Nicola Gallucci. It belongs to the transition period between the 14th-century Sulmonese school and the renovatio provided by Lorenzo Ghiberti of Florence.

A chalice pall from the 20th century, made of embroidered silk and gold thread, donated by Monsignor Ezio d'Antonio, is of Roman origin. It belonged to Pope Pius XI, who died in 1939 and donated it to the bishop of Lanciano. The pall, a small square of cloth used to cover the chalice, depicts the Madonna and Child, freely inspired by Botticelli's "Madonna of the Book" (1480-81).

The Madonna is finely embroidered, capturing the details so meticulously that the words in the open book held by the Virgin can be read in Latin. Of southern origin is the processional cross from the 13th-14th centuries, made of embossed and engraved brass from the Church of Sant'Agostino. The cross is notable for its antiquity and allows a comparison with the nearby cross by Nicola Gallucci of Guardiagrele. The recto, missing the lower part, shows the Virgin with the Announcing Angel Gabriel, the Crucifix in the center, and an angel above. The verso features the Tetramorph symbols surrounding the figure of Christ in Majesty.

Nicola Gallucci's cross is from the 15th century, made of embossed, engraved, niello, and champlevé enamel silver, from Sant'Agostino. Critics attribute this work to the mature period of the goldsmith from Guardiagrele, even though it appears more modest than the cross preserved in the showcase of the Church of Santa Maria Maggiore (1422). It stands out as an innovative piece compared to the traditional Abruzzese processional crosses. Nicola created fully three-dimensional figures with masterful embossing and chiseling.

From the Abruzzo region is the Saint Maurice among the Theban Legion (1650), an oil on canvas, from the now-lost Church of San Maurizio in Largo dei Frentani. From the Neapolitan school is the statue of Saint Joseph with the Child Jesus from the 18th century, from Palazzo Stella Maranca on Via Santa Maria Maggiore. The Stella family, related to Cardinal Antinori of L'Aquila, became extinct in the 1960s. The work is notable for the craftsmanship in the detailed carving and the harmonious, dynamic composition, coupled with mastery in color rendering and sensitivity in portraying the expression of the sleeping Child and the tenderness of the gesture of holding the Child's small foot.

=== Room 6: Display of "Dressed" Statues ===
This room showcases the "dressed" statues, known as "canocchie" in Abruzzese folklore, which typically consist only of hands and heads mounted on an iron skeletal structure. From private collections and churches in Lanciano, several 18th-century Neapolitan works are featured, including an interesting Sant'Anna Metterza with the Child Mary and Saint Nicholas of Bari dressed in paper. Noteworthy statues include Saint Clare from the church of the same name, dating to the 19th century, and a Saint Anthony of Padua from the Convent of the Observant Friars Minor in Lanciano.

The statue, larger than life-size to fit the niche in the church, originally stood in the Church of Santa Chiara and San Filippo Neri on Corso Roma. Santa Chiara holds a spherical pyx in her hands, made of gilded metal, which is an iconic element symbolizing Saint Clare of Assisi and is associated with the emblem of the Order of Poor Clares. From the southern region is the Sorrowful Madonna from the 19th century, carved and painted wood with embossed and chiseled silver, from a private collection, likely used in a bedroom setting as an object of familial devotion.

On the wall, there is a large display panel that recounts the tradition of making "dressed" statues in Abruzzo and the ritual of dressing them. Also from the southern region is the Immaculate Madonna from the 18th century, carved and painted wood, still wearing its original clothing, delicately made of silk and well-preserved.

=== Room 7: Reliquaries and Missals ===
This room houses various reliquaries dating from the 17th to 19th centuries, with the most notable being the reliquary of Pope Celestine V. Also on display is the original bust of Bishop Saint Augustine, from the church of the same name, now replaced with a copy; this work dates to 1718 and was created by Domenico Renzetti. Additionally, there is a baptismal font made of carved, engraved, painted, and gilded wood in an octagonal shape from the 17th century, similar to one still found in the Church of San Nicola. Particularly noteworthy is the 17th-century sacristy jewelry, adorned with four panels depicting landscapes and hunting scenes executed in cut paper on a black background.

From Abruzzo is the 17th-century sacristy cabinet, made of carved wood, cut paper, and glass, originally from the Church of Sant'Agostino. The upper part of the cabinet features four mirrored sections with applied art: four small panels made of cut paper applied on a black background, depicting landscapes and hunting scenes with intricate vegetal motifs.

From the southern region is the 18th-century reliquary of Celestine V, carved and gilded wood, possibly from the church and former monastery of Santo Spirito, founded in the 13th century by the Celestine monks and now home to the archaeological museum. From Naples are various ostensory reliquaries dating from the 18th to 19th centuries, made of embossed and engraved silver and brass, containing bone fragments of saints or "contact relics" — fragments of garments or cloth placed in contact with actual relics to absorb their beneficial effects for the people.

From Germany is the cover of the Dresden Missal from 1868, made of leather, brass, and chromolithographic paper, from the Cathedral. This valuable missal, featuring a reproduction of Raphael's Sistine Madonna on the cover, was a gift to the cathedral from musician Angelo Ciccarelli, who studied music in Lanciano in 1815 under the guidance of chapel master Filippo Gianni, and later served at the Dresden Court in 1830.

The wall Crucifix with the "Holy Face," inspired by the relic of Manoppello, dates to the 17th century, carved and painted wood. Its unique feature is the similarity of the face to that of Manoppello. Alongside the Dresden Missal, the central showcase in the room also contains a volume of Giovanni Pico della Mirandola's Opera omnia, printed in 1498 as an incunable in Venice, from the Cathedral Chapter Library in Lanciano. This is an extremely rare volume, with only three known surviving copies of this edition. The volume was restored at the Grottaferrata Abbey.

From Cardinal Aquilano in Lanciano, Anton Ludovico Antinori, there is the Memory Book of the City and Diocese of Lanciano in Latin, dating to the 18th century, in its original manuscript form, from the Cathedral Chapter Library. The manuscript consists of two volumes donated by Lanciano native Antonio Cinerini (1736-1802), who inherited it from his brother, Primicerius Don Silvestro Cinerini, the vicar capitular of Lanciano in 1769. Also displayed is a Rogatorium Officium Terrae Lanzani from the 14th century, a manuscript on parchment from Santa Maria Maggiore in Lanciano, important for reconstructing the city's religious history from its origins. It includes various invocations to the city's patron saints and was used during Rogation ceremonies, propitiatory processions held within and outside the city walls. The manuscript mentions the Chapel of San Longino and the ancient 8th-century Basilian monastery, where the Eucharistic miracle occurred.

=== Room 8: Liturgical Vestments ===
This room features the liturgical vestments of Monsignor Francesco Maria De Luca and the episcopal rings of Lanciano, traditionally kept in the treasury of Madonna del Ponte. Also present are two 18th-century works by the cabinetmaker Modesto Salvini of Orsogna: a tabernacle and a bust of Saint Paschal Baylon, and a painting of Saint Joseph with the Child Jesus by Giacinto Diano (1790), from Palazzo Stella-Maranca. The room also houses several works awaiting restoration.

From Rome is a pastoral staff from 1940, made of embossed and engraved silver foil, donated by the Carinci heirs. The pastoral staff was created for Monsignor Alberto Carinci, ordained as a priest in 1922 and consecrated as bishop of the Diocese of Isernia-Venafro in 1940, and later of the Diocese of Bojano-Campobasso in 1948.

From the southern region is the bust of Saint Apollonia from the 17th century, carved, painted, and gilded wood, from Sant'Agostino, possibly originally from an ancient chapel in the Sant'Iorio district. The bust likely contained the saint's relic and was venerated in the rural areas around Lanciano for relief from toothaches.

Finally, a precious 17th-century reliquary, reworked in the 20th century, carved, painted, and gilded wood, from the Cathedral, represents a unique item in the diocesan heritage, rich with over 4,000 fragments of bone and fabric, including relics of Saint Venturia's head and Saint Cordula's bone.
