= Museo del duomo di Guardiagrele =

Museum of religious art in Guardiagrele, Italy

Coordinates: 42.1907°N 14.2220°E

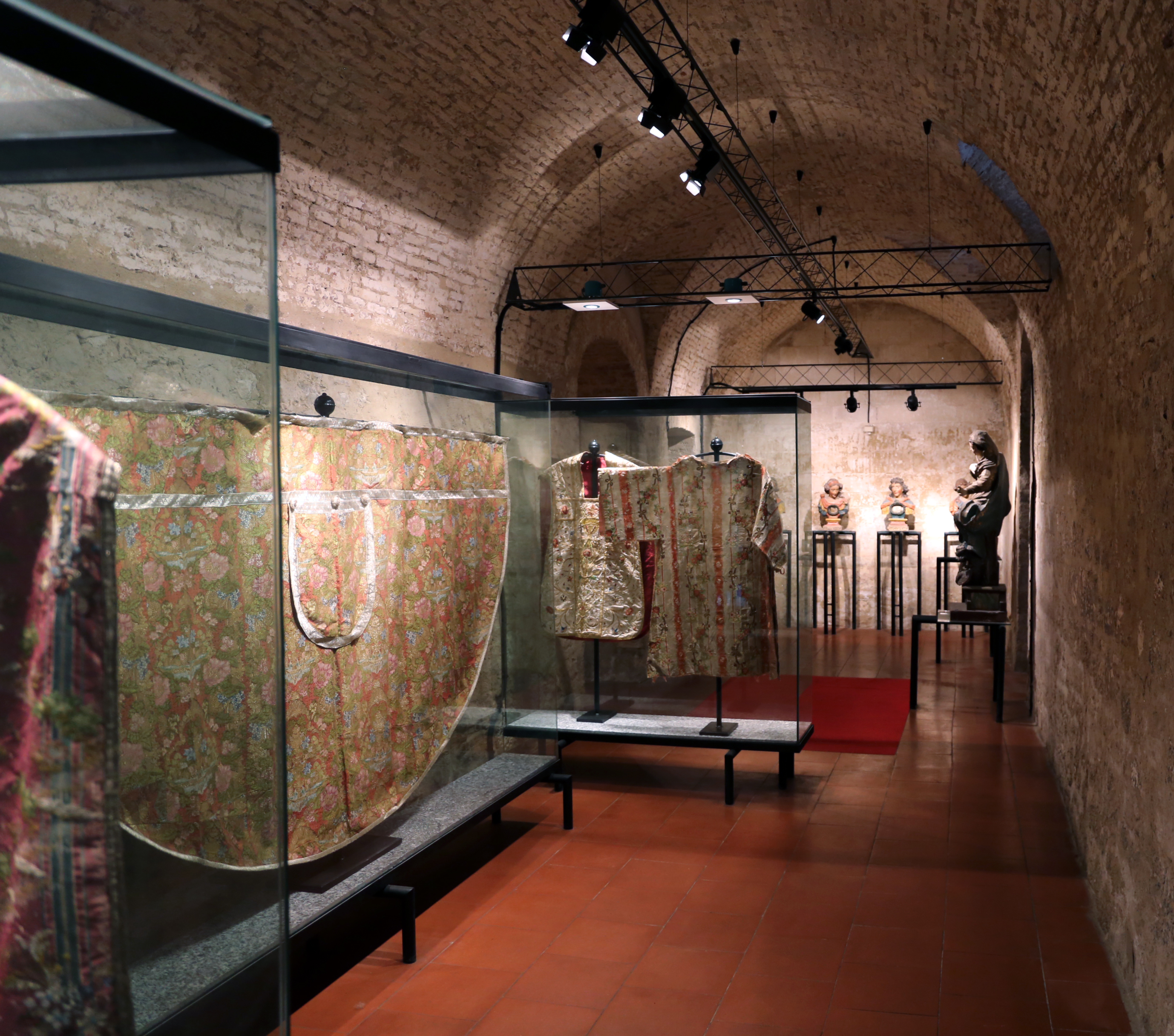
- Museo del duomo di Guardiagrele

- Location within Abruzzo
- Location: Guardiagrele
- Type: Religious art
- Website: http://www.museidiguardiagrele.it/museo-del-duomo

Museo del duomo di Guardiagrele (Italian for Cathedral Museum of Guardiagrele) is a museum of religious art in Guardiagrele, Province of Chieti (Abruzzo).

== History ==
The Duomo Museum was inaugurated in 1987 and set up in what was the medieval hall of the Collegiate Church of Santa Maria Maggiore, the city's cathedral, which was later transformed into a crypt following the construction of the staircase and the elevation of the nave. It was established at the behest of Parish Priest Don Domenico Grossi with the aim of safeguarding, enhancing, and making more accessible a heritage that was previously scattered across the Marsican churches and often targeted by theft.

Thanks to a document drafted by the notary Tideno of Guardiagrele, it is known that in 1570, Guanfranco d'Ugno, the procurator of the building of S. Maria Maggiore, Giantommaso d'Ugno, and others from the Guardiagrele regiment pawned the Collegiate Church's silverware. Further thefts and requisitions are evidenced by a plaque from 1741, once placed at the entrance to the church. A large part of the furnishings and the book collection was stolen during the looting by Napoleonic troops on February 24–25, 1799, which resulted in the loss of three libraries and about forty thousand volumes.

Other works, stolen to order, included the cross by Nicola da Guardiagrele, traditionally carried in processions, of which only pieces were recovered, and eight illuminated choir books from the 14th and 15th centuries, of which only two remain intact. Francesca Manzari deserves credit for identifying an illuminated page during a book antiquities exhibition in Rome in 2005.

All the displayed works, dating from the early 14th century to the early 20th century, are owned by the Church.

== Architecture ==
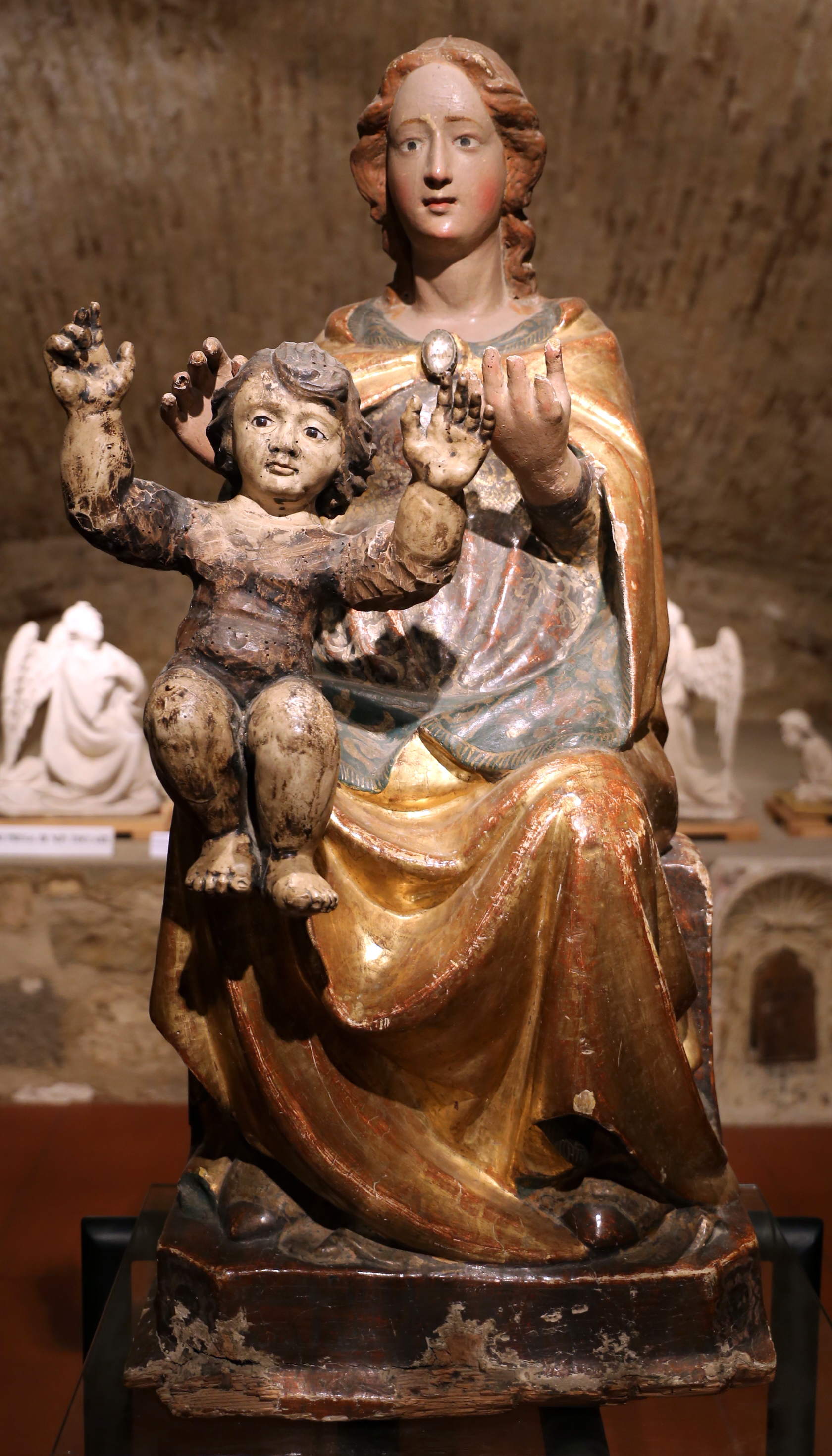
Madonna dell'Aiuto, 15th century, painted wood. The Child is from the 18th century

The Duomo of Guardiagrele has undergone several transformations over the centuries due to troubled historical events, changing tastes, and practical needs that have repeatedly altered its appearance. Its earliest origins define it as the Temple of Mary, founded in 430 AD, characterized by a simple basilica layout with a gabled roof.

Current architectural elements do not allow tracing construction phases before the 12th century, to which the distinctive central position of the square tower on the façade can be attributed, serving both as an entrance and bell tower, following a typical French model. Significant survivals can be identified in some stretches of masonry to the south and near Via dei Cavalieri, where there are single-light windows and pilasters that divide the wall regularly, despite various interventions, particularly those of the 13th and 14th centuries. The Duomo acquired its present external appearance in the 14th century. The 1706 earthquake destroyed the interiors, leading to the retreat of the staircase towards the portal, which previously led to the raised presbytery. This created more space for worship needs through the elevation of the nave. As previously noted, the central bell tower on the façade is the most distinctive element of the church's architecture. In the late 14th century, a large late Gothic ogival portal was added, replacing an older, lost one. The 14th-century decorative overlay did not disrupt the Romanesque architectural layout but enriched the façade with Gothic ornamental elegance. Indeed, the portal of Santa Maria Maggiore is considered one of the finest examples of Gothic architecture in Abruzzo.

The jambs feature clusters of receding columns, with capitals adorned with delicate vegetal motifs and Attic bases, along with concentric cords of the depressed architrave. The lunette once contained the sculptural group of the Coronation of Mary, attributed to Nicola da Guardiagrele or his school.

== Collection ==
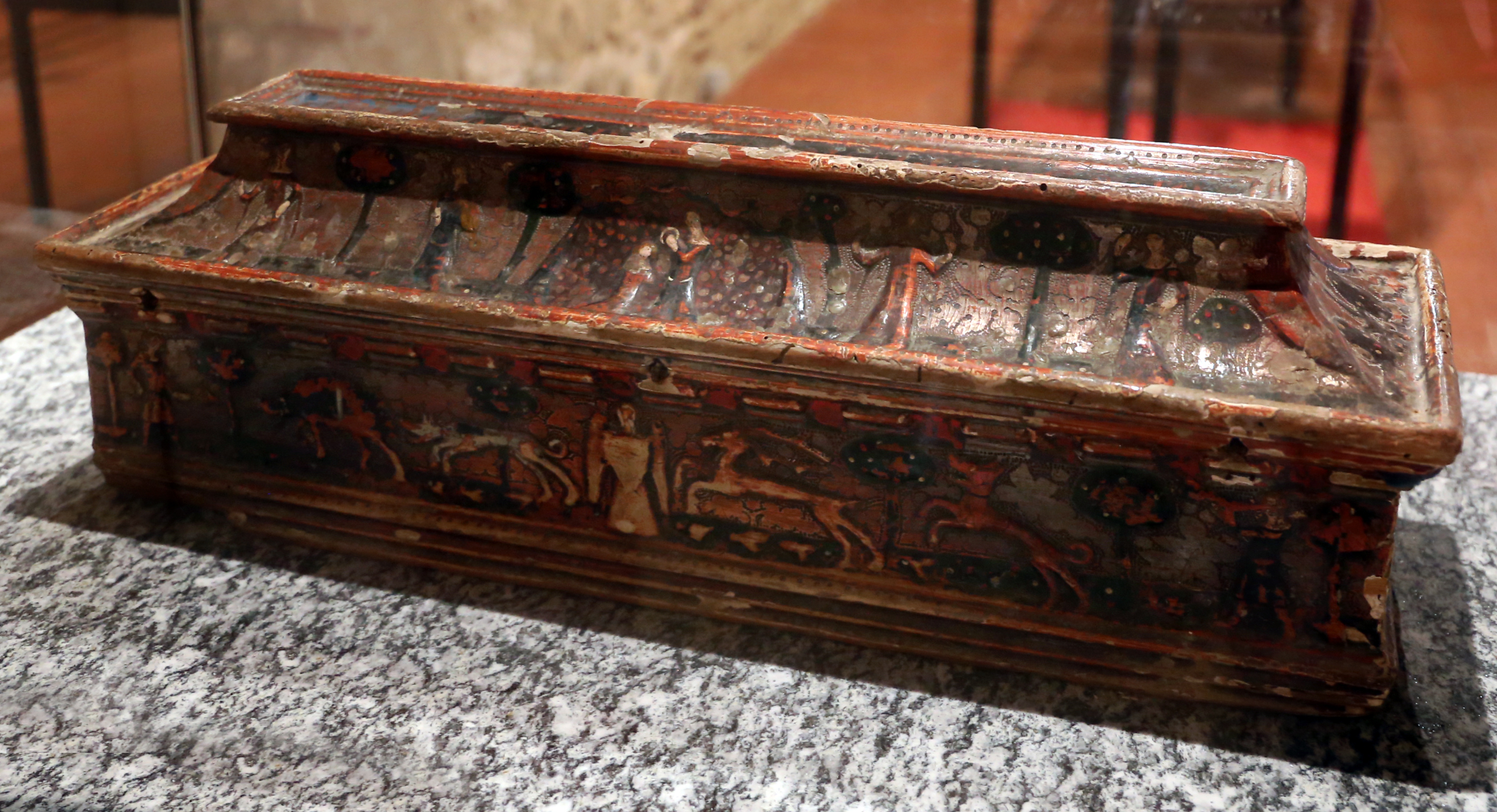
Coffret from the 14th century, carved wood, from the Church of San Francesco

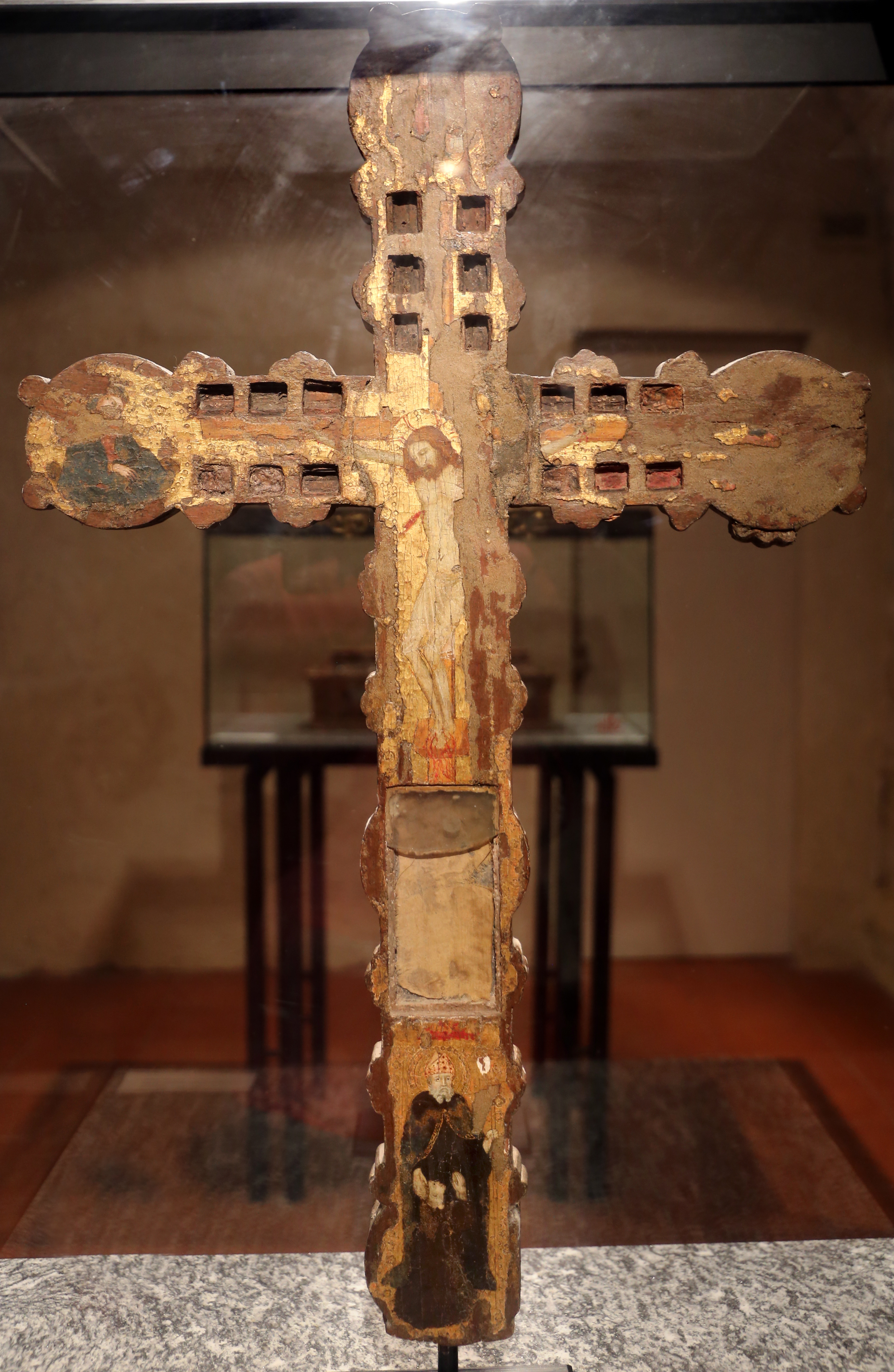
Reliquary cross from the 14th century, painted wood, with a portrait of Saint Nicholas the Greek at the base, from the Church of San Francesco

Below are the works displayed in the museum, divided by the 3 rooms:

Room 1 "Sacred Vestments"

- Chasuble (unknown, 18th century)
- Chasuble (unknown, 18th century)
- Dalmatic (unknown, 17th-18th century)
- Dalmatic (unknown, 18th century)
- Cope (unknown, 18th century)
- Reliquary bust of the Savior (unknown, 1704)
- Statue of the Immaculate Conception (unknown, 1742)
- Reliquary of Saint Balbina (unknown, 17th-18th century)
- Reliquary of Saint Cleric (unknown, 17th-18th century)
- Reliquary of Saint Bibiana (unknown, 17th-18th century)
- Reliquary of Saint Victorinus (unknown, circa 1700)
- Statue of a holy bishop (unknown, late 17th century)

Room 2 "Nicola da Guardiagrele and Guardiese Goldsmithing"

- Processional cross (Nicola da Guardiagrele, circa 1431)
- Statue of Madonna dell'Aiuto (unknown, late 15th century)
- Coronation of Mary and angels (unknown, 15th century sculpture)

Room 3 "14th-Century Art"

- Reliquary crucifix (Giottesque school?, 14th century)
- Box (unknown, mid-14th century)
