= Guardiagrele =

- Comune
- Comune di Guardiagrele
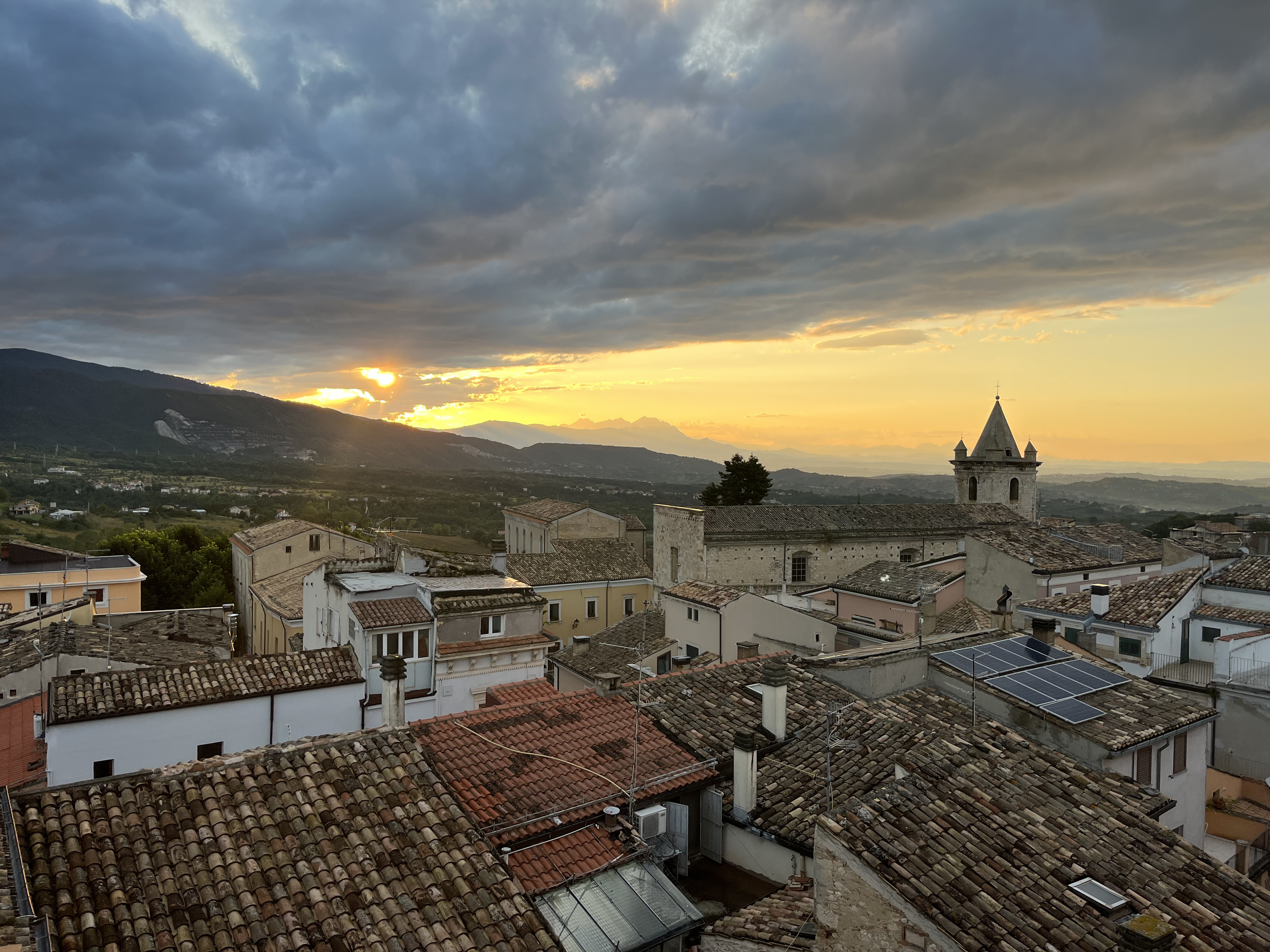

- Coat of arms

- Location within Italy Location within Abruzzo
- Coordinates: 42°12′N 14°13′E
- Country: Italy
- Region: Abruzzo
- Province: Chieti (CH)
- Frazioni: Anello, Bocca di Valle, Caporosso, Caprafico, Caprafico piane, Cerchiara, Colle Barone, Colle Luna, Comino, Crognaleto, Melone, Piano Fonti, Piana San Bartolomeo, San Biase, San Domenico, San Leonardo, Santa Lucia, San Vincenzo, Sciorilli, Tiballo, Villa San Vincenzo, Voire

Government
  - Mayor: Donatello Di Prinzio

Area
  - Total: 56 km^{2} (22 sq mi)
- Elevation: 576 m (1,890 ft)

Population (31 December 2010)
  - Total: 9,497
  - Density: 170/km^{2} (440/sq mi)
- Demonym: Guardiesi
- Time zone: UTC+1 (CET)
  - Summer (DST): UTC+2 (CEST)
- Postal code: 66016
- Dialing code: 0871
- Patron saint: Donatus of Arezzo
- Saint day: August 7
- Website: Official website

Guardiagrele (Italian pronunciation: [ɡuardiaˈɡreːle]; Abruzzese: La 'Uàrdije; Latin: Guardia Graelis) is a town and comune in the province of Chieti, part of the Abruzzo region of central Italy. It is in the foothills of the Maiella mountain at an elevation of around 576 metres (1,890 ft). Its population numbers about 10,000.

Commenting on the views of the mountains and valleys of the Maiella visible from some points in the town, the poet Gabriele d'Annunzio nicknamed Guardiagrele la terrazza d'Abruzzo ("Abruzzo's terrace").

Guardiagrele is the seat of the Maiella National Park, and is one of I Borghi più belli d'Italia ("The most beautiful villages of Italy"). It is a member of Cittaslow.

The closest airport is Abruzzo Airport, which is 25 miles distance. The closest beach is Ortona, which is 18 miles drive. The town has several hospitals, one of which is Ospedale di Guardiagrele. The nearest train station is in Chieti, 16 miles away.

== Main sights ==
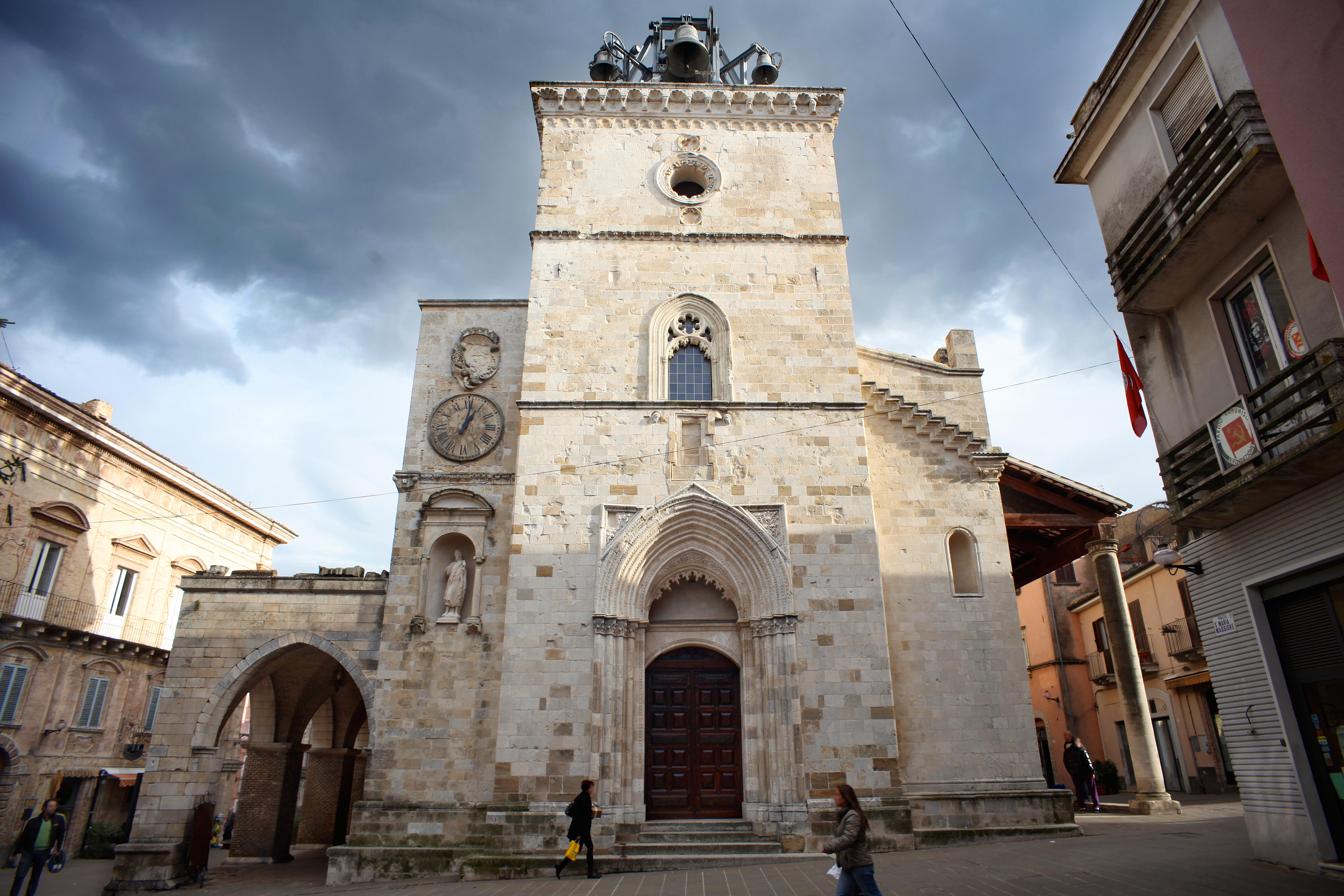
West view of Santa Maria Maggiore

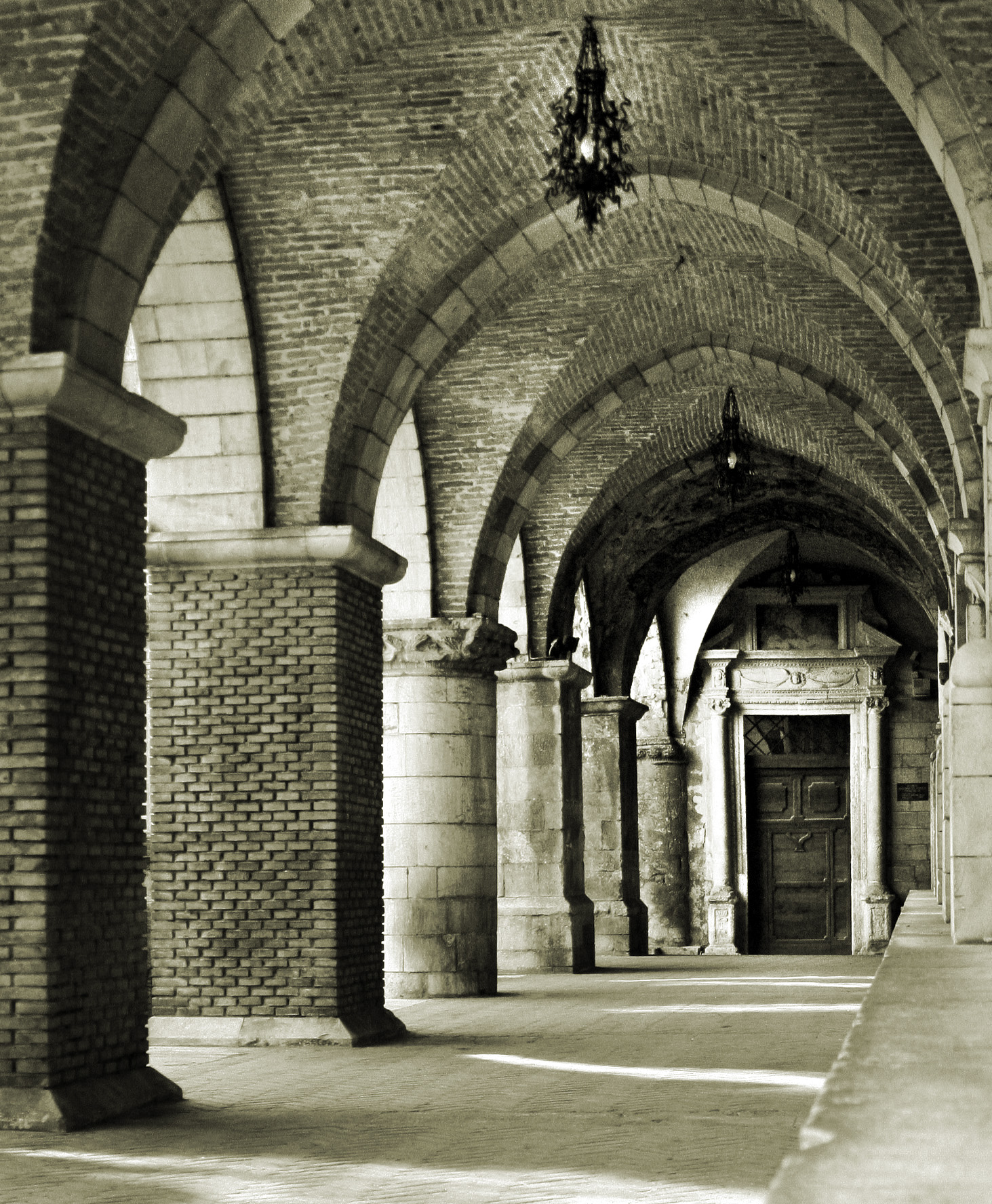
Portico to the church of Santa Maria Maggiore

The Collegiate Church of Santa Maria Maggiore is the duomo or cathedral of Guardiagrele. The façade has an elegant 14th-century Gothic portal. The lunette above the portal has a relief depicting the Coronation of the Virgin, attributed to the school of Nicola di Guardiagrele. Under the colonnaded portico, next to the lateral door, is the large fresco depicting St. Christopher (1473), painted by Andrea De Litio. The interior, completely rebuilt in the 18th century following an earthquake, has Baroque stucco-work and a shrine of the same period set off a 15th-century fresco representing the Madonna of the Milk.

In addition to Santa Maria Maggiore, there are several other churches and palazzi or mansions of various ages which are of architectural interest, including S. Nicola di Bari (founded in the 4th century), the convent of the Chapuchins (1599), Palazzo De Lucia (16th century), Palazzo Elisii (15th-18th century), the cloister of the Palazzo Comunale Piazza San Francesco (17th century) and Palazzo Marini (1391).

Museums include:

- Museo Civico (Civic Museum)
- Museo del Costume e della Tradizione della Nostra Gente (Costume and Folk Museum)
- Museo del Duomo ("Cathedral Museum"), in Santa Maria Maggiore
- Museo Archeologico ("Archaeological Museum").

== Culture ==
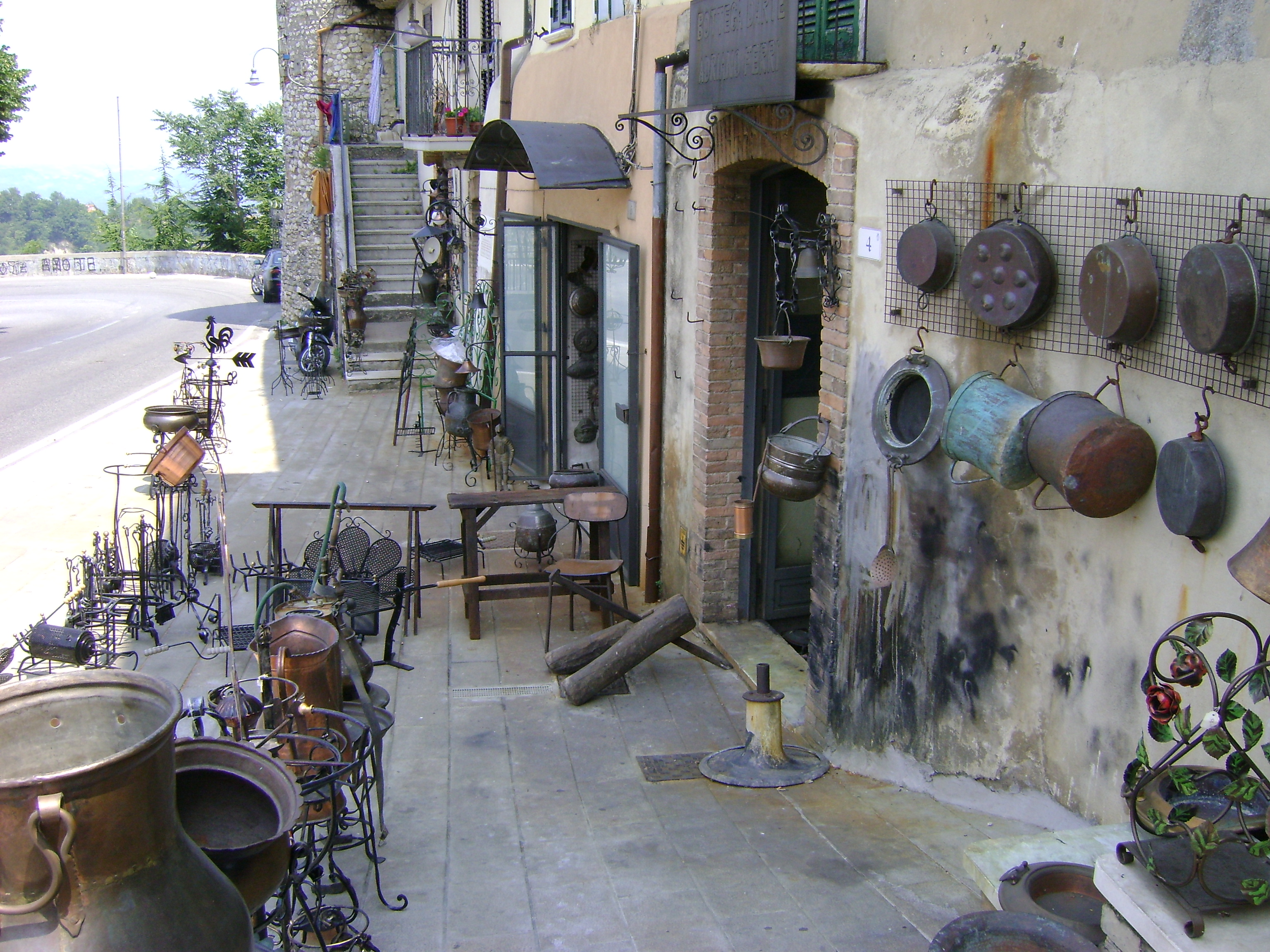
Crafts next to Porta San Giovanni

Known throughout Abruzzo for its wrought-iron craft, copper craft and gold-work, Guardiagrele was the home of the great goldsmith and sculptor Nicola da Guardiagrele, who was born there in the late 14th century.

The patron saints of Guardiagrele are Saint Donatus of Arezzo and Saint Emidius. Annually between the 6th and 8 August there is a festival celebrating these saints in which the effigy of Donatus is paraded around the streets of Guardiagrele. It is traditional to eat porchetta (oven or spit roasted suckling pig flavoured with pepper, rosemary, garlic and other seasonings) at this time.

In the 11th century Archimandrite Saint Nicholas the Greek led a group of monks fleeing the Saracens who had occupied Calabria. In 1338 his body was moved to Guardiagrele and interred in la Chiesa di San Francesco (14th century). His saint's day is celebrated on the third Sunday of May.

The church preserved in its choirbooks the important Guardiagrele Codex, of polyphonic works by Landini and anonymous composers.

== People ==
- Morgan De Sanctis, footballer

== Climate ==
Climate data for Guardiagrele, elevation 577 m (1,893 ft), (1951–2000)
Month	Jan	Feb	Mar	Apr	May	Jun	Jul	Aug	Sep	Oct	Nov	Dec	Year
Record high °C (°F)	22.7 (72.9)	22.4 (72.3)	27.4 (81.3)	27.2 (81.0)	33.0 (91.4)	36.9 (98.4)	40.0 (104.0)	40.8 (105.4)	38.2 (100.8)	29.8 (85.6)	25.4 (77.7)	21.0 (69.8)	40.8 (105.4)
Mean daily maximum °C (°F)	7.9 (46.2)	8.9 (48.0)	11.4 (52.5)	15.0 (59.0)	19.9 (67.8)	24.3 (75.7)	27.3 (81.1)	27.4 (81.3)	23.3 (73.9)	17.8 (64.0)	12.6 (54.7)	9.4 (48.9)	17.1 (62.8)
Daily mean °C (°F)	5.4 (41.7)	6.0 (42.8)	8.2 (46.8)	11.5 (52.7)	16.1 (61.0)	20.2 (68.4)	23.1 (73.6)	23.2 (73.8)	19.5 (67.1)	14.7 (58.5)	10.0 (50.0)	6.9 (44.4)	13.7 (56.7)
Mean daily minimum °C (°F)	2.9 (37.2)	3.1 (37.6)	5.0 (41.0)	8.0 (46.4)	12.3 (54.1)	16.1 (61.0)	18.8 (65.8)	18.9 (66.0)	15.8 (60.4)	11.6 (52.9)	7.4 (45.3)	4.4 (39.9)	10.4 (50.6)
Record low °C (°F)	−8.1 (17.4)	−7.0 (19.4)	−6.1 (21.0)	−2.0 (28.4)	0.5 (32.9)	6.0 (42.8)	9.0 (48.2)	9.0 (48.2)	3.3 (37.9)	−1.0 (30.2)	−5.0 (23.0)	−8.0 (17.6)	−8.1 (17.4)
Average precipitation mm (inches)	91.5 (3.60)	72.7 (2.86)	73.8 (2.91)	78.4 (3.09)	63.9 (2.52)	61.8 (2.43)	53.6 (2.11)	59.4 (2.34)	71.9 (2.83)	91.7 (3.61)	95.2 (3.75)	92.9 (3.66)	906.8 (35.71)
Average precipitation days	7.9	7.6	8.5	7.8	7.8	6.7	4.6	5.1	6.5	8.3	9.1	9.0	88.9
Source: Regione Abruzzo
