= Jacopo da Lanciano =

Italian painter

Jacopo da Lanciano (15th century) was an Italian painter known by a single signed work, a Madonna and Child now in the Museo diocesano di Lanciano, province of Chieti, region of Abruzzo. The painter appears to have been influenced by Paolo Veneziano.
