= Melone, Guardiagrele =

Melone
- Frazione
- Interactive map of Melone
- Coordinates: 42°05′N 14°05′E
- Country: Italy
- Region: Abruzzo
- Province: Chieti
- Commune: Guardiagrele
- Time zone: UTC+1 (CET)
  - Summer (DST): UTC+2 (CEST)

Melone is a frazione (borough) in the municipality of Guardiagrele, Province of Chieti, in the Abruzzo region of Italy.
