= Victoire-Melone Geayant =

French actress

Victoire-Melone Geayant, stage name Mademoiselle Guéant (fl. 1749–1758), was a French stage actress.

She was engaged at the Comédie-Française in 1749. She became a Sociétaires of the Comédie-Française in 1754. She retired in 1758.

She played romantic heroines and enjoyed a short but successful career before her premature death from smallpox.
