= Nicola da Guardiagrele =

Italian painter

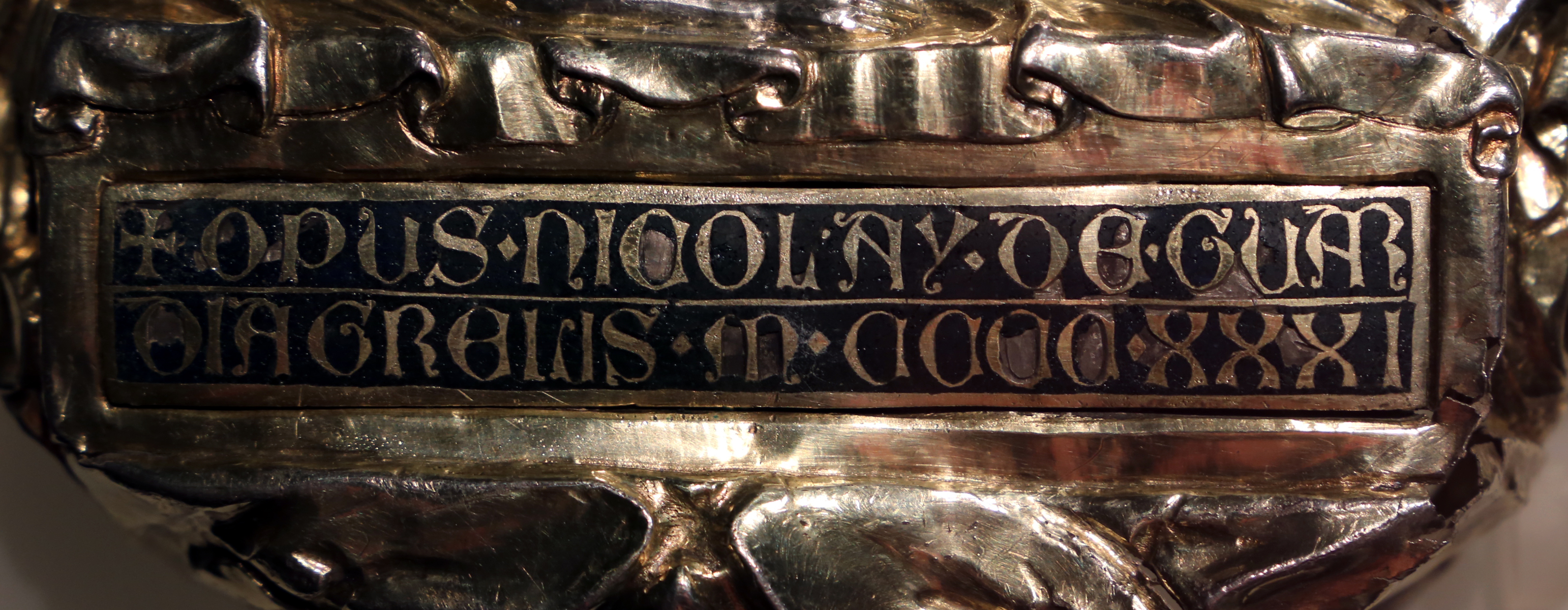
Signature on Guardiagrele Duomo processional cross

Nicola da Guardiagrele (born Nicola Gallucci or Nicola di Andrea di Pasquale; c. 1385/1390 – c. 1462) was an Italian late medieval goldsmith, painter and etcher.

== Biography ==
Born at Guardiagrele, in what is now the province of Chieti, he was primarily influenced by Gothic art and by the contemporary Tuscan school of artists such as Lorenzo Ghiberti.

He worked mostly as goldsmith, with numerous works dated and signed, although also sculptures and a panel painting are also attributed to him. His first known works, the cross of Roccaspinalveti and two monstrances, date from 1413–1418. Together with Paolo Romano and Pietro Paolo da Todi he had executed the twelve silver apostles which were in the Papal chapel before the Sack of Rome (1527). His other works include the antependium in the Cathedral of Teramo, an illuminated prayer book from c. 1420 (now at the Musée Condé) and a Madonna dell'Umiltà at the Uffizi. A sculpted Annunciation, of debated attribution, is at the Museo del Bargello in Florence.

He died at Guardiagrele around 1462.
