= Forts of Rome =

The Forts of Rome are the complex of fixed works of military defense constituting the entrenched field of the city, consisting of fifteen "Prussian"-type forts and four hexagonal batteries. They were erected between 1877 and 1891 in defense of the strip of territory immediately surrounding the city of Rome (Italy), then in the countryside, at a distance of about 4–5 km from the Aurelian Walls and about 2–3 km from each other, for an overall development of about 40 km (25 mi).

After some controversies about the project, the forts were commissioned by Royal Decree nr. 4007 of August 12, 1877. The first seven forts (Monte Mario, Braschi, Boccea, Aurelia Antica, Bravetta, Portuense and Appia Antica) were built starting from the same year 1877 on the right side of the Tiber (except for the Forte Appia Antica), as a defence against landings on the coast of the Tyrrhenian Sea.
The construction of the remaining eight forts (Antenne, Ardeatina, Casilina, Ostiense, Pietralata, Prenestina, Tiburtina and Trionfale) began in 1880 thanks to new funds; by Royal Decree of November 1, 1882, they were named after the streets on which they stood.
The four batteries were built in an intermediate and set-back position: they were called Tevere (on the right bank of the river under Monte Mario), Appia Pignatelli, Porta Furba and Nomentana.

All the buildings soon fell into disuse, due both to their excessive closeness to the expanding city and to the evolution of the ballistic techniques and of the military strategies; by Royal Decree n. 2179 of October 9, 1919, they were removed from the list of the State fortifications and used as barracks and military depots. Later they ended up being incorporated into the urban fabric and, in some case, were delivered to the Municipality of Rome; however, some of them are currently unused or abandoned.

== List ==
#	Fort	Years of construction	Surface (ha)	Municipio	Location	Distance to the next one (km)	Current usage
1	Aurelia Antica	1877–81	5,7	XII	Via Aurelia Antica km 3, on the corner of Via di Bravetta	2,0	Guardia di Finanza
2	Boccea	1877–81	7,3	XIII	Via di Boccea km 1	1,5	Entrusted to the Municipality of Rome
3	Braschi	1877–81	8,2	XIV	Via della Pineta Sacchetti	4,0	AISE and Raggruppamento unità difesa
4	Monte Mario	1877–82	8,4	I	Via Trionfale km 3, on Monte Mario	2,0	Esercito Italiano
5	Trionfale	1882–88	21,0	XIV	Via Trionfale km 7	4,0	Entrusted to the Municipality of Rome
6	Antenne	1882–91	2,5	II	Monte Antenne, at the confluence of Tiber and Aniene	4,0	Entrusted to the Municipality of Rome
7	Pietralata	1881–85	25,4	IV	Via di Pietralata, close to the Aniene	2,0	Esercito Italiano
8	Tiburtina	1880–84	23,8	IV	Via Tiburtina km 4	2,0	Esercito Italiano
9	Prenestina	1880–84	13,4	V	Via Prenestina km 4	3,0	Autonomous social center "CSOA Forte Prenestino"
10	Casilina	1881–82	3,8	V	Via Casilina km 4	4,0	Depot for the military area of the former Rome-Centocelle Airport
11	Appia Antica	1877–80	16,5	VIII	Via Appia Antica km 4	2,0	Aeronautica Militare
12	Ardeatina	1879–82	11,2	VIII	Via Ardeatina km 4	2,5	Entrusted to the Municipality of Rome
13	Ostiense	1882–84	8,8	IX	Via Ostiense km 4	2,5	Polizia di Stato
14	Portuense	1877–81	5,2	XI	Via Portuense km 2	2,0	Entrusted to the Municipality of Rome
15	Bravetta	1877–83	10,6	XII	Via di Bravetta, within the Valle dei Casali	2,0	Entrusted to the Municipality of Rome

== Bibliography ==
- Operare i forti. Per un progetto di riconversione dei forti militari di Roma. Rome: Gangemi Editore. 2010. ISBN 978-88-492-1777-3.
- Elvira Cajano (2006). Il sistema dei forti militari a Roma. Rome: Gangemi Editore. ISBN 978-88-492-1057-6.
- Michele Carcani (1883). I forti di Roma (PDF). Rome: Voghera Carlo tipografo di S.M. Archived from the original (PDF) on August 11, 2014.
- Giorgio Giannini (1998). I forti di Roma. Rome: Newton Compton Editori. ISBN 978-88-8183-895-0.
