= Aurelio (Rome) =

Q. XIII Aurelio
- Quartiere of Rome
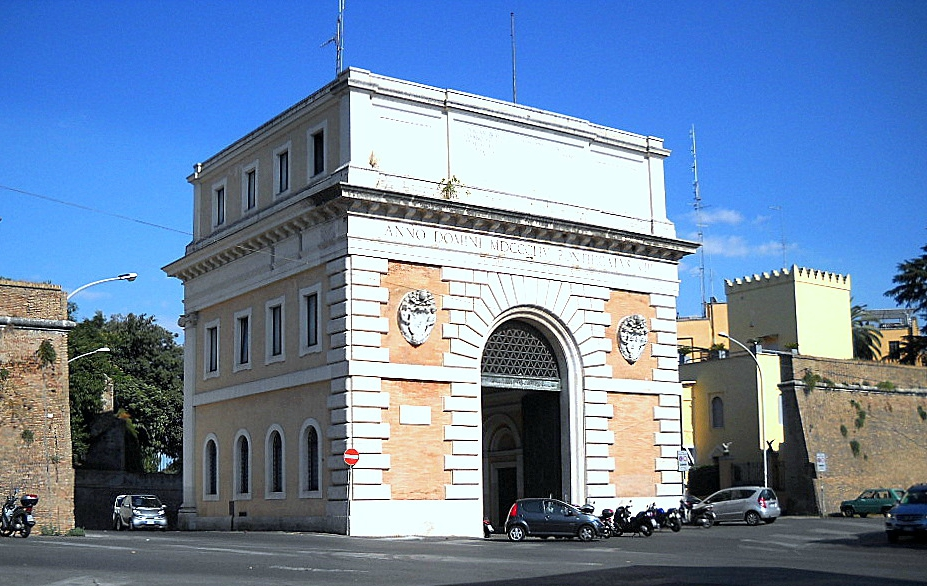

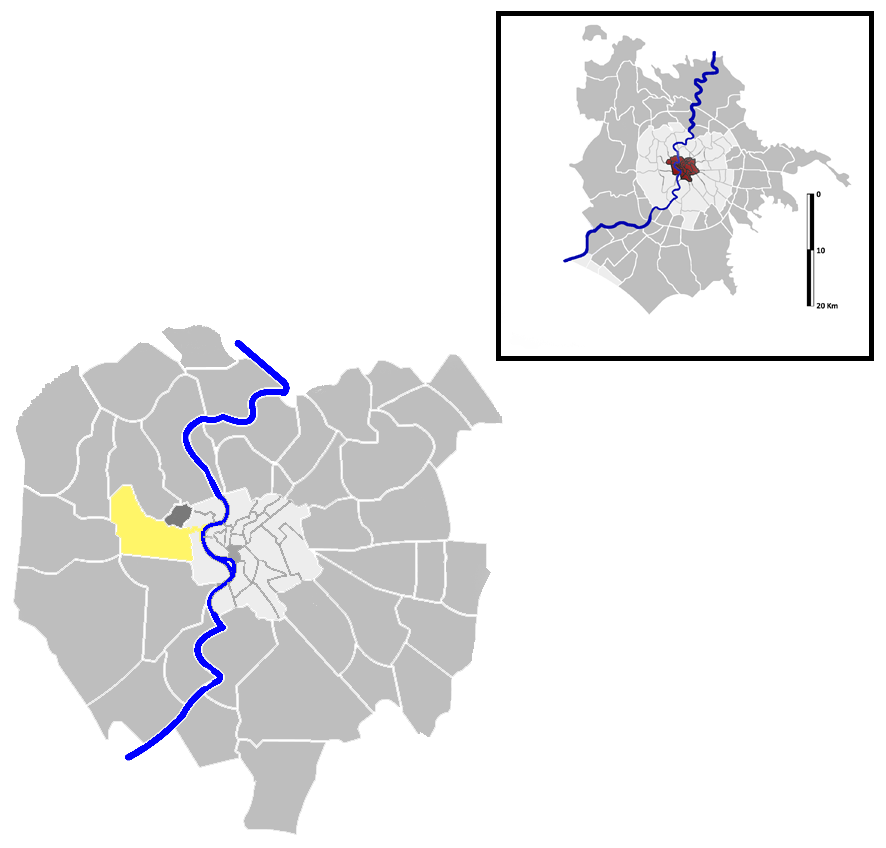
- Position of the quartiere within the city of Rome
- Country: Italy
- Region: Lazio
- Metropolitan City: Rome
- Comune: Rome
- Municipio: Municipio XIII; Municipio XIV
- Established: 20 August 1921

Area
  - Total: 1.8205 sq mi (4.7151 km^{2})

Population (2016)
  - Total: 41,920
- Time zone: UTC+1 (CET)
  - Summer (DST): UTC+2 (CEST)

Aurelio is the 13th quartiere of Rome (Italy), identified by the initials Q. XIII. It belongs to the Municipio XIII and Municipio XIV.

== History ==
Aurelio is among the first 15 quartieri of the city, originally delimited in 1911 and officially established in 1921. It takes its name from the Via Aurelia.

== Geography ==
The territory of the quarter includes the urban zones 18A Aurelio Sud, 18D Aurelio Nord and part of the urban zone 19A Medaglie d'Oro.

=== Boundaries ===
To the north, the quarter borders with quartiere Trionfale (Q. XIV), from which it is separated by Via del Pineto Torlonia, Via di Valle Aurelia, Via Angelo Emo, Via Anastasio II, Via Aurelia, Via di Porta Pertusa and Viale Vaticano up to the Vatican wall. To the north, Aurelio also borders with the Vatican City.

Eastward, the quartiere borders with rione Borgo (R. XIV), from which is separated by the stretch of the Leonine Walls beside Via di Porta Cavalleggeri, Largo di Porta Cavalleggeri and Viale delle Mura Aurelie, and with rione Trastevere, the border being marked by the stretch of the Janiculum walls between Porta Portese and Porta San Pancrazio.

Southward, the quarter borders with quartiere Gianicolense (Q. XII), whose border is delineated by the stretch of Via di San Pancrazio between Piazzale Aurelio and Via Aurelia Antica and by the latter, up to Via di Torre Rossa.

To the west, Aurelio borders with suburbio Aurelio (S. IX), from which it is separated by Via di Torre Rossa, Piazza di Villa Carpegna, Circonvallazione Aurelia, Circonvallazione Cornelia, Via Pier delle Vigne, Via di Boccea and Largo di Boccea. Westward, Aurelio also borders with quartiere Primavalle (Q. XXVII), whose boundary is outlined by Largo di Boccea, Via Domenico Tardini and Via della Pineta Sacchetti, up to Via del Pineto Torlonia.

=== Odonymy ===
Being the quarter very close to the Vatican City, streets and squares are mainly named after popes and prominent cardinals. In the northern part of the quartiere, however, hodonyms remember ancient jurists; whilst, in the north-western part, some streets are dedicated to authors and humanists. Odonyms of the quarter can be categorized as follows:

- Authors and humanists, e.g. Via Giovanni Aurispa, Rampa Antonio Ceriani, Via Giacinto De Vecchi Pieralice, Via Giovanni Battista Gandino, Via Giacomo Giri, Via Giannozzo Manetti, Via Giorgio Merula, Via Umberto Moricca, Via Carlo Pascal, Via Ettore Stampini;
- Cardinals, e.g. Via Cardinal Agliardi, Via Egidio Albornoz, Via Lodovico Altieri, Via Giovanni Bessarione, Piazza Francesco Borgongini Duca, Via Camillo Caccia Dominioni, Via Bonaventura Cerretti, Via del Cottolengo, Via Angelo Di Pietro, Via Cardinal Domenico Ferrata, Via Ludovico Micara, Via Cardinal Pacca, Via Giuseppe Pecci, Via Agostino Richelmy, Via Bartolomeo Roverella;
- Jurists, e.g. Via Accursio, Via Francesco Albergotti, Via Andrea Alciato, Via Baldo degli Ubaldi, Via Domenico Barone, Via Bartolo da Sassoferrato, Via Enrico Besta, Via Prospero Farinacci, Via Graziano, Via Francesco Pacelli, Via Francesco Scaduto, Via Francesco Schupfer;
- Local toponyms, e.g. Via Aurelia, Via del Casale di San Pio V, Via della Cava Aurelia, Via delle Fornaci, Via di Monte del Gallo, Via della Stazione di San Pietro, Via di Valle Aurelia, Via di Villa Betania;
- Popes, e.g. Via Anastasio II, Via Bonifacio VIII, Piazzale e Via Gregorio VII, Via Innocenzo III, Via Innocenzo XI, Via Leone XIII, Via Marcello II, Via Paolo II, Via Pelagio I, Via Pio IV, Largo e Via San Pio V, Piazza Pio XI, Via Sabiniano, Via Sant'Agatone papa Via San Damaso, Via Sant'Evaristo, Via San Lucio, Via Sant'Ormisda, Via San Silverio, Via San Telesforo.

== Places of interest ==
=== Civil buildings ===
- Villa Abamelek
- Villa Carpegna

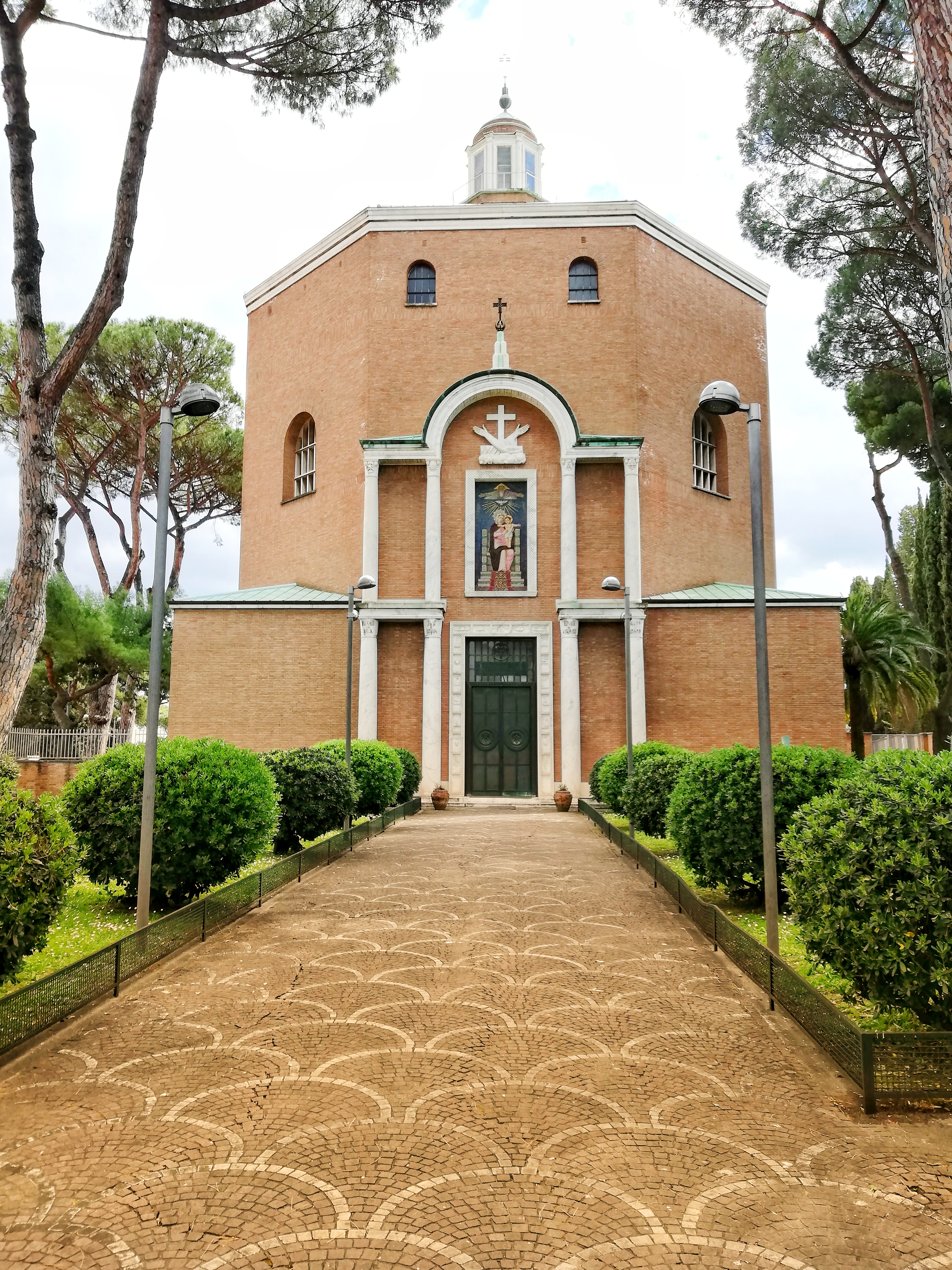
Santa Maria Mediatrice

=== Religious buildings ===
- Santa Maria delle Grazie alle Fornaci fuori Porta Cavalleggeri, in Piazza Santa Maria delle Fornaci.
- San Pio V a Villa Carpegna, in Largo San Pio V.
- Santa Maria del Riposo, on the corner between Via Aurelia and Via della Madonna del Riposo.
- Santa Maria della Visitazione all'Aurelio, in Via di Torre Rossa. 41.893585°N 12.429557°E

a former cloister annexed to the church of San Pio V, now included within the grounds of the Pontifical Institute of Sacred Music.

- San Gregorio VII, in Via Gregorio VII.
- Santa Maria Mediatrice, in Via di Santa Maria Mediatrice.
- Sant'Ambrogio, in Via Girolamo Vitelli.
- San Giuseppe Cottolengo, in Via di Valle Aurelia.
- Santa Maria della Provvidenza, in Via degli Embrici. 41.909617°N 12.434609°E
- Santa Maria Immacolata di Lourdes a Boccea, in Via Santa Bernadette.
- San Leone, in Via di Boccea.
- Santi Protomartiri Romani, in Via Angelo Di Pietro.
- Santa Caterina martire, in Via del Lago Terrione.

it is an Orthodox place of worship, located within the park of Villa Abamelek.

=== Archaeological sites ===
- Catacomb of Calepodius
- Porta Cavalleggeri
- Porta San Pancrazio

=== Parks ===
- Pineto Regional Park
