= Municipio XIX =

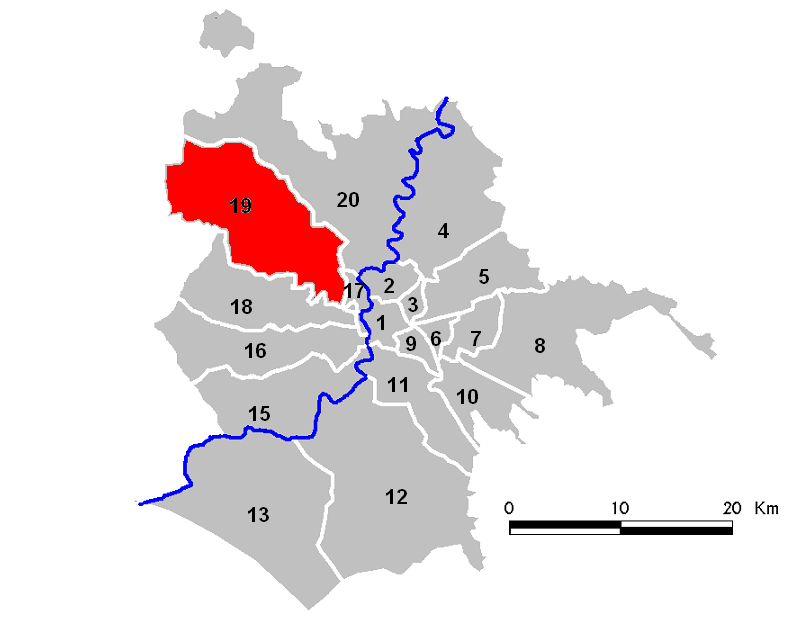
- Coordinates: 41°53′35″N 12°28′58″E
- Country: Italy
- Municipality: Rome

Government
  - President: Alfredo Milioni

Area
  - Total: 131.28 km^{2} (50.69 sq mi)

Population (2010)
  - Total: 184,911
  - Density: 1,408.5/km^{2} (3,648.1/sq mi)
- Website: comune.roma.it

The Municipio XIX was an administrative subdivision of the city of Rome. Following the administrative reform of 11 March 2013, it was suppressed and merged into the new, and coextensive, Municipio XIV. Its territory is situated to the north-west part of the municipality of Rome.

== Subdivision ==
Municipio XIX was divided in 8 urban zones:

M. XIX (Monte Mario)
| 19a Medaglie d'Oro | 39,939 |
| 19b Primavalle | 60,059 |
| 19c Ottavia | 15,165 |
| 19d Santa Maria della Pietà | 18,561 |
| 19e Trionfale | 16,769 |
| 19f Pineto | 2,080 |
| 19g Castelluccia | 16,747 |
| 19h Santa Maria di Galeria | 2,605 |
| Not located | 5,493 |
| Total | 177,418 |

The territory included the following districts:
Q.XIII Aurelio, Q.XIV Trionfale and Q.XXVII Primavalle

the following "suburbi":
S.X Trionfale and S.XI Della Vittoria

and the following zones:
Z.XLVIII Casalotti, Z.XLIX Santa Maria di Galeria, Z.L Ottavia, Z.LI La Storta and Z.LIII Tomba di Nerone.

The "Municipio" includes the following urban areas:
Balduina, La Lucchina, Monte Mario, Palmarola, Pineta Sacchetti, Proba Pretonia, Quartaccio, Selva Candida, Selva Nera, Tragliatella, Torresina e Torrevecchia.

== Politics ==
The list of the Presidents of the Municipio XIII since 2001:

| | Coalition | President |
| 2008 | center-right | Alfredo Milioni |
| 2006 | center-left | Fabio Lazzara |
| 2001 | center-left | Fabio Lazzara |

== Resources ==
In the "Municipio" there are a lot of green areas, the principal are: the Natural Reserve of the Insugherata, the urban Regional Park of the Pineto, the Natural Monument "Quarto degli Ebrei - Tenuta di Mazzalupetto".

There are the Agostino Gemelli Hospital and the San Filippo Neri Hospital, two of the most important hospitals in Rome.

== Education ==
Public libraries include Casa del Parco in Pineta Sacchetti and Franco Basaglia in Primavalle.
