= Murder of Gabriele Sandri =

2007 police shooting in Italy

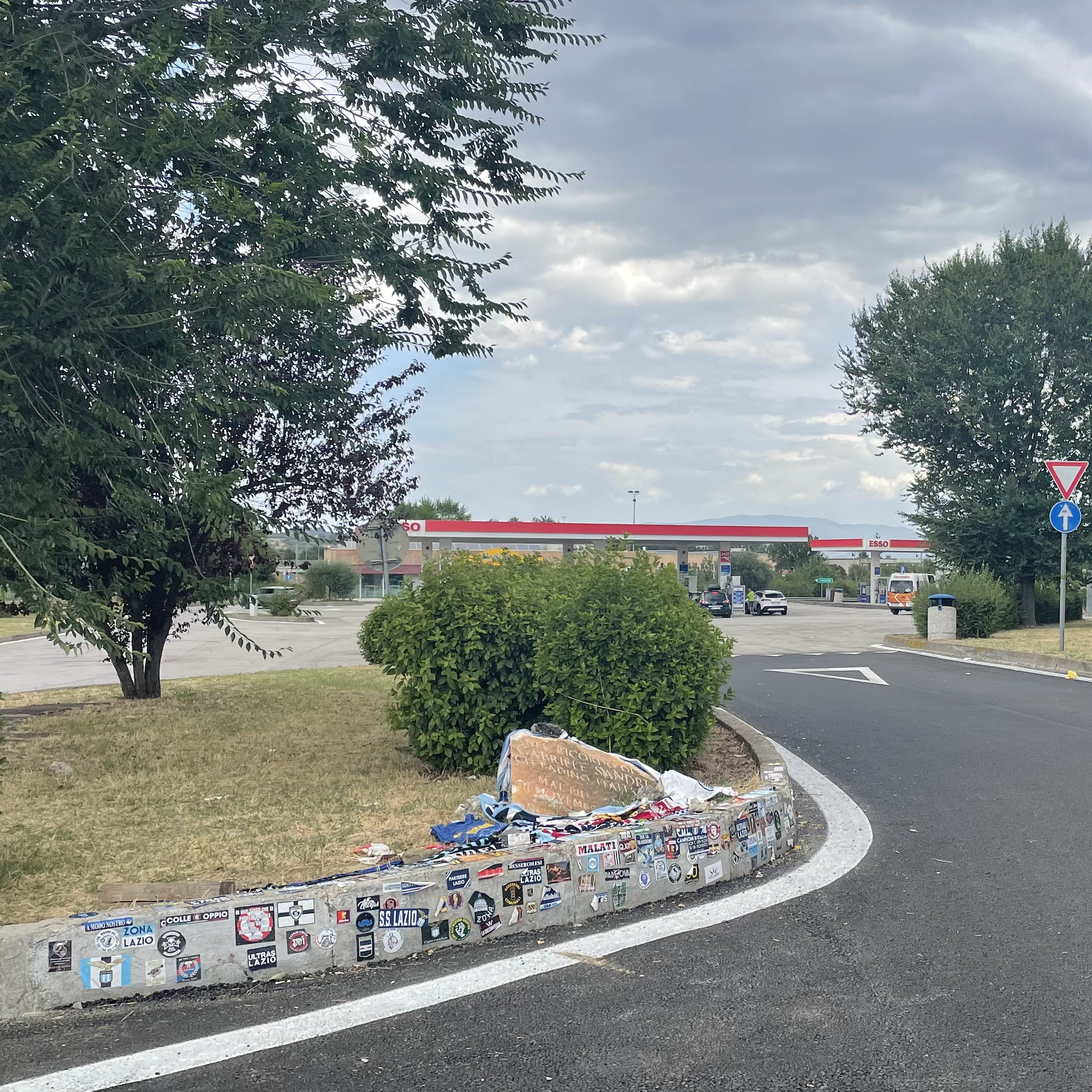
- The memorial to Gabriele Sandri at the site of the shooting.
- Location: A1, Autogrill Badia al Pino, Civitella in Val di Chiana
- Date: 11 November 2007
- Attack type: Shooting
- Weapon: Pistol
- Deaths: 1
- Victim: Gabriele Sandri
- Perpetrator: Luigi Spaccarotella
- Motive: Impulsive behaviour

The murder of Gabriele Sandri is a crime that occurred on 11 November 2007 in Italy, in which the police officer Luigi Spaccarotella fired a gunshot on the A1 motorway near the Autogrill at Badia al Pino Est service station located in Civitella in Val di Chiana (Arezzo), taking the life of a 26 year old disc jockey from Rome following some scuffles between football fans. What followed were nationwide scenes of violence.

== Background ==
Born in Rome on 23 September 1981, 26-year-old, Gabriele Sandri, nicknamed "Gabbo", was a well-known disc jockey in the capital. He was a fan of the SS Lazio football team and his parents were owners of a clothing shop in the Balduina area.

== Shooting ==
On the morning of 11 November 2007, Sandri and four other friends were driving on the Autostrada A1, heading towards Milan to watch the football match between Inter Milan and SS Lazio scheduled for 3:00 pm at the Giuseppe Meazza stadium in San Siro. The five, on board a Renault Mégane, stopped at the Badia al Pino service station near Civitella in Val di Chiana (Arezzo) to wait for the arrival of other friends, also coming from Rome in a Renault Clio. Around 9:00 am, the Lazio fans came into contact with some Juventus supporters and a fight broke out between the two groups.

The scuffles attracted the attention of a patrol of the Highway Police (Polizia Stradale) who were on the opposite side of the road and who, having turned on the siren, moved to the other side of the road. While the group of Sandri's friends got back into the car and were about to leave, the officer Luigi Spaccarotella - according to his testimony, convinced that the four were fleeing following a robbery - got out of the service car, took aim and from a distance of about fifty metres fired two gunshots.

The second bullet passed through the fence dividing the carriageways and hit the Mégane, which in the meantime had started moving, hitting Sandri in the neck, who was sleeping in the middle of the back seat. The travelling companions immediately realised Gabriele's serious condition and therefore stopped at the next service station in Reggello, 30 km further on, to alert both the police and the emergency services. The ambulance arrived on the scene but the young man was already dead.

=== Reactions and consequences ===
The news spread and the Italian Football Federation (FIGC) decided to postpone the match between Inter and Lazio: for the other matches, the start was ordered with a 10 minute delay. For the following weekend, the FIGC ordered the suspension of serie B and serie C. Several stadiums were the scene of incidents, caused by fans protesting against the police. In Bergamo, the match between Atalanta and Milan was suspended after a few minutes due to the excesses of the Orobic supporters. Other violent reactions occurred in Parma and Taranto. In Lavello, Potenza, the Brindisi fans were the protagonists of some episodes of violence against the police and six Apulian fans were arrested, while Milan and Rome were invaded by processions of fans who attacked the barracks and the police. For reasons of public safety, the match between AS Roma and Cagliari scheduled for 20:30 in the capital was also postponed. The worst of the violence was reported in Rome. Windows were smashed and vehicles were set on fire.

As an immediate measure, the FIGC expressed the idea of banning away matches considered to be the most dangerous and of making recognition mandatory at the entrance to stadiums. The fan card (Tessera del tifoso) was then promoted in 2008, although in the following years the problem of violence in stadiums and between fans was never completely resolved.

Statuto dedicated the song È già domenica to Sandri, released on the album of the same name in 2010.

=== Funeral ===
Sandri's funeral was held on 14 November 2007, in the Church of San Pio X in Balduina. Thousands of people attended the ceremony, including the entire Lazio team, the captain of the Associazione Sportiva Roma, Francesco Totti and the coach Luciano Spalletti. As the coffin was being carried out, some of those present chanted slogans against the police and scarves from other teams were left on the coffin.

=== Gabriele Sandri’s derby ===
On March 19th 2008, SS Lazio played the first Derby della Capitale aganish AS Roma, since the death of Gabriele Sandri. The derby was dedicated to Sandri and before the match AS Roma captain Fracesco Totti, along with representatives from the Curva Sud, paid their respects to Sandri by walking to the Curva Nord leaving flowers and unfolding a banner with the text "Le lacrime non conoscono colore: Gabbo uno di noi" (Tears know no color: Gabbo, one of us).

== The legal proceedings ==
In July 2009, Spaccarotella was sentenced to 6 years of imprisonment for manslaughter with conscious guilt: the sentence was then reformed on appeal. In December 2010 and changed to voluntary homicide, re-evaluating it to eventual intent, and increasing the sentence to 9 years and 5 months of imprisonment.

In 2012, the Supreme Court of Cassation, to which Spaccarotella's defense had appealed, reaffirmed the second-instance verdict of the Court of Assizes of Appeal of Florence, confirming the conviction for voluntary homicide. Ten years after the crime, in the autumn of 2017, he was granted semi-liberty, to be able to carry out voluntary work.

== Bibliography ==
- Filippo Grassia (2010). Inter. Il calcio siamo noi. Sperling & Kupfer. p. 389. ISBN 9788820049676.
- Maurizio Martucci (2008). 11 novembre 2007. L'uccisione di Gabriele Sandri una giornata buia della Repubblica. Sovera Edizioni. p. 160. ISBN 9788881247875.

== See also ==
- 2007–08 Serie A
- Police brutality by country
