= Forte Braschi (Rome) =

Building in Rome, Italy

- Part of Entrenched field of Rome
- Via della Pineta Sacchetti, 216 – 00167 Rome in Italy

Site information
- Open to the public: no
- Condition: in use

Location
- Coordinates: 41°54′50″N 12°25′24″E

Site history
- Built: 1877–1881
- Built by: Victor Emmanuel II

Garrison information
- Occupants: Ministry of Defence

Forte Braschi is one of the 15 forts of Rome, built in the period between 1877 and 1891 to constitute the "entrenched field of Rome".
It is located in the Quarter Q. XIV Trionfale, within the Municipio XIV.

== History ==
It was built starting from 1877 and completed in 1881, on a surface of 8.2 ha (20 acres) along Via della Pineta Sacchetti. The area on which it was built belonged to Cardinal Romoaldo Braschi-Onesti, from which it takes its name.

Since 1925, having ceased its strategic function, it has hosted the military Italian intelligence agencies, such as the Servizio Informazioni Militare (SIM). On 29 May 1931, the fort was the scene of the shooting of the anarchist Michele Schirru, convicted of planning an attempt on Mussolini.

Since the second postwar period it has hosted the Servizio Informazioni Forze Armate (SIFAR) and the Servizio Informazioni Difesa (SID). From 1977 to 2007 it housed the operation center of the military intelligence, the Servizio per le Informazioni e la Sicurezza Militare (SISMI). It currently houses the headquarters of the Agenzia Informazioni e Sicurezza Esterna (AISE) and of the Raggruppamento Unità Difesa (RUD). It is entitled to Nicola Calipari.

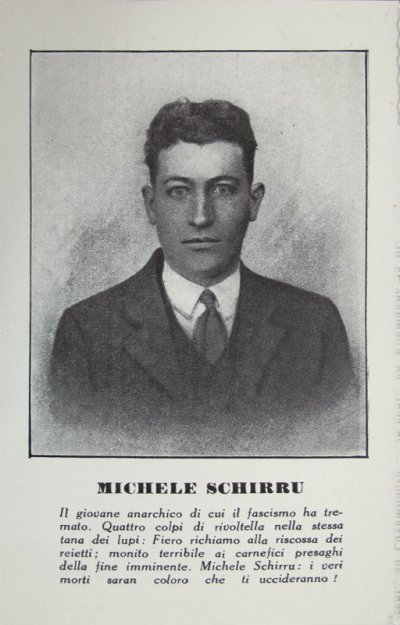
Michele Schirru (1899–1931).

== Bibliography ==
- Operare i forti. Per un progetto di riconversione dei forti militari di Roma. Rome: Gangemi Editore. 2010. ISBN 978-88-492-1777-3.
- Elvira Cajano (2006). Il sistema dei forti militari a Roma. Rome: Gangemi Editore. ISBN 978-88-492-1057-6.
- Michele Carcani (1883). I forti di Roma. Rome: Voghera Carlo tipografo di S.M.
- Giorgio Giannini (1998). I forti di Roma. Rome: Newton Compton Editori. ISBN 978-88-8183-895-0.
- Pablo Dell'Osa (2017). Il tribunale speciale e la presidenza di Guido Cristini 1928-1932). Milan: Mursia. ISBN 978-88-425-5162-1.
