= Trionfale =

Q. XIV Trionfale
- Quartiere of Rome
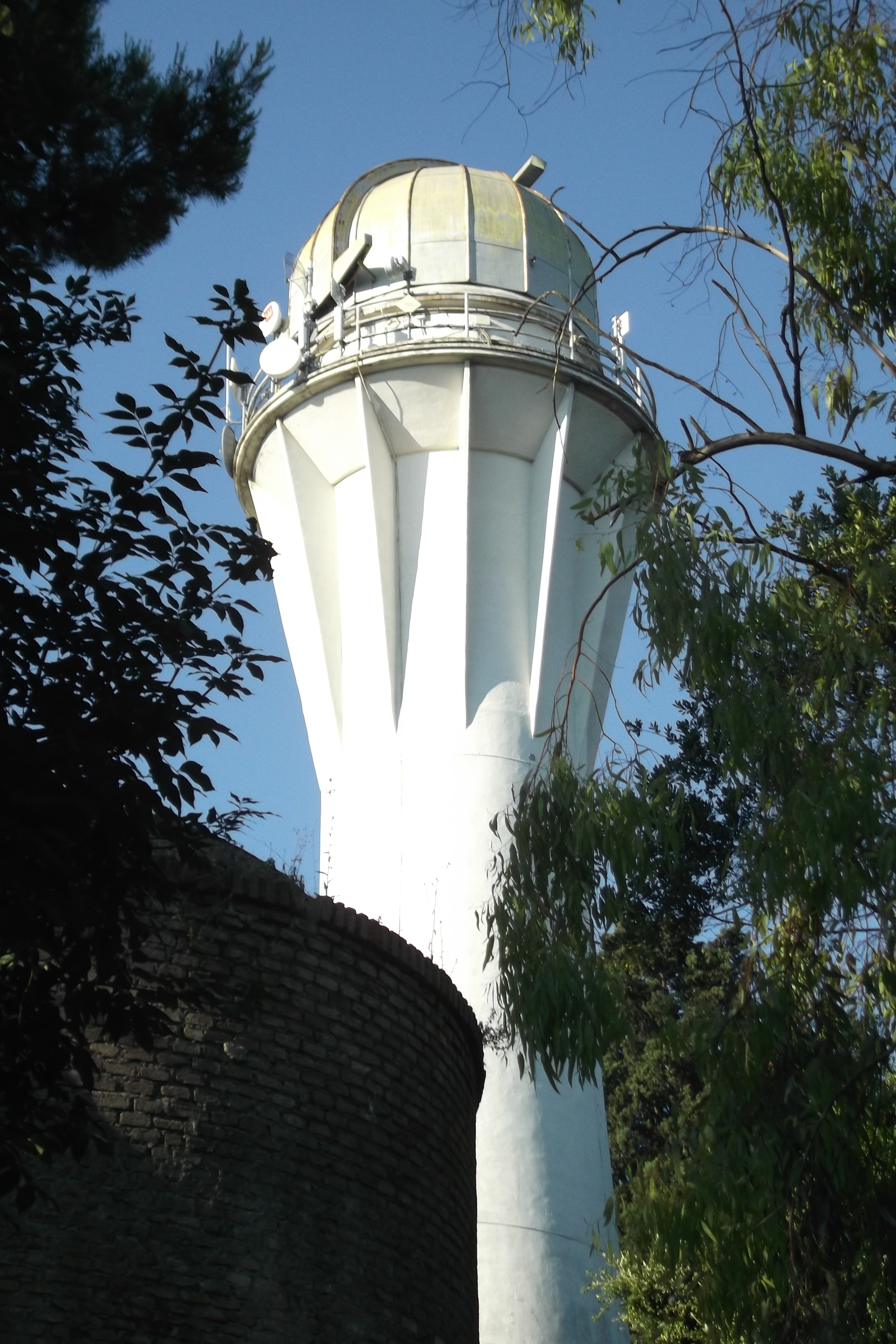

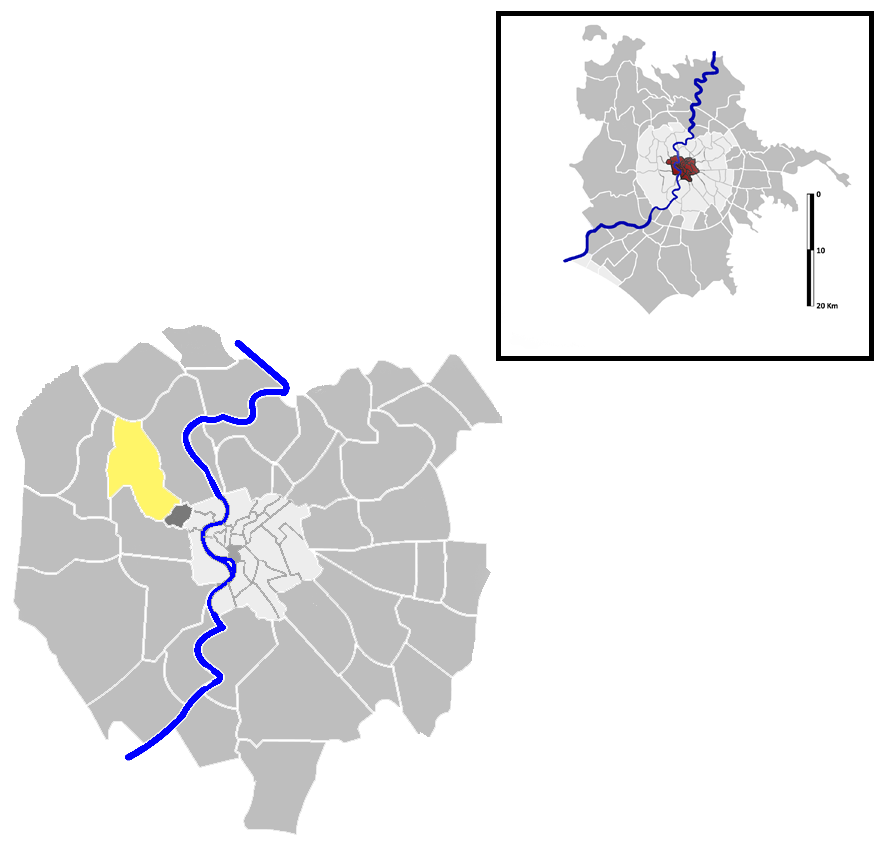
- Position of the quartiere within the city of Rome
- Country: Italy
- Region: Lazio
- Metropolitan City: Rome
- Comune: Rome
- Municipio: Municipio I Municipio XIII; Municipio XIV
- Established: 20 August 1921

Area
  - Total: 2.38 sq mi (6.17 km^{2})

Population (2016)
  - Total: 55,338
- Time zone: UTC+1 (CET)
  - Summer (DST): UTC+2 (CEST)

Trionfale (Italian pronunciation: [tri.oɱˈfaːle]) is the 14th quartiere of Rome (Italy), identified by the initials Q. XIV. The toponym also indicates the urban zone 19E of Municipio XIV.

== History ==
Trionfale is among the first 15 quartieri of the city, originally delimited in 1911 and officially established in 1921. It takes its name from the Via Trionfale. During the Middle Age the pilgrims coming from the Via Francigena used to travel along this road in order to get to Rome. The little church of San Lazzaro in Borgo, where pilgrims had to stop before entering the city walls, bears witness to this.

== Geography ==
=== Boundaries ===
To the north, the quarter borders with suburbio Della Vittoria (S. XI), from which it is separated by the stretch of Via Trionfale between Via della Pineta Sacchetti and Via Igea.

To the west, Trionfale borders with quartiere Della Vittoria (Q. XV), whose border is delineated by the stretch of Via Trionfale between Via Igea and Viale delle Milizie, as well as with rione Prati (R. XXII), the boundary being marked by Via Leone IV.

Southward, Trionfale shares its border with the Vatican City and with quartiere Aurelio, from which it is separated by Viale Vaticano, Via di Porta Pertusa, Via Aurelia, Via Anastasio II, Via Angelo Emo, Via di Valle Aurelia and Via del Pineto Torlonia.

To the east, the quartiere borders with quartiere Primavalle (Q. XXVII), whose boundary is delineated by Via della Pineta Sacchetti.

=== Odonymy ===
Odonyms are focused, in the southern part of Trionfale, on prominent admirals, Navy heroes and naval combats; in the north-western area, streets and squares are mostly named after Italian war heroes (next to Viale delle Medaglie d'Oro) and ancient authors. The avenues within the park of Via Proba Petronia are named for Italian actors. Some streets close to Circonvallazione Trionfale are named after famous philosophers. Odonyms of the quarter can be categorized as follows:

- Actors, e.g. viale Gianni Agus, viale Galeazzo Benti, viale Gino Bramieri, viale Memmo Carotenuto;
- Admirals and Navy heroes, e.g. viale degli Ammiragli, via Marcantonio Bragadin, piazzale Ammiraglio Bergamini, via Antonio Canal, via Francesco Caracciolo, via Pietro de Cristofaro, via Ruggero di Lauria, via Andrea Doria, via Angelo Emo, via Domenico Millelire, piazza Francesco Morosini, via Gino Nais, via Vittor Pisani, via Luigi Rizzo, via Giorgio Scalia, via Francesco Sivori, via Sebastiano Veniero, via Sebastiano Ziani;
- Italian war heroes, e.g. via Guido Alessi, via Ugo Bartolomei, via Alberto Cadlolo, largo e via Damiano Chiesa, via Ugo De Carolis, largo Giuseppe di Montezemolo, piazzale degli Eroi, via Genserico Fontana, piazza e via Attilio Friggeri, via Alfredo Fusco, via Duccio Galimberti, via Luigi Gherzi, via Aladino Govoni, via Guglielmo Grandjacquet, piazzale e viale delle Medaglie d'Oro, via Vittorio Montiglio, via Pier Ruggero Piccio, via Pantaleone Rapino, via Romeo Rodriguez Pereira, Rampa Sergio Sartof, via Alfredo Serranti;
- Latin and Greek authors, e.g. piazza Ammiano Marcellino, via Arnobio, via Cornelio Nepote, via Cremuzio Cordo, via Elio Donato, via Emilio Draconzio, piazza Ennio, via Fedro, via Festo Avieno, via Firmico Materno, piazza Giovenale, via Lattanzio, via Livio Andronico, via Lucilio, via Lucio Apuleio, via Marziale, via Nevio, via Orbilio, via Pacuvio, via Paolo Orosio, via Polibio, via Pomponio Porfirione, via Prisciano, via Proba Petronia, via Quintiliano, via Seneca, via Silio Italico, via Svetonio, viale Tito Livio, via Vegezio, via Venanzio Fortunato;
- Naval combats, e.g. via Candia, via Cipro, via della Meloria, via Ostia, via Rialto, via Santamaura, via Tolemaide, via Tunisi;
- Philosophers, e.g. via Giacomo Barzellotti, via Giovanni Bovio, via Giordano Bruno, via Tommaso Campanella, via Enrico Caporali, via Marsilio Ficino, via Antonio Genovesi, via Giovanni Gentile, via Pietro Giannone, via Antonio Labriola, via Aonio Paleario, via Carlo Passaglia, viale Platone, via Plotino, via Pietro Pomponazzi, via San Tommaso d'Aquino, via Paolo Sarpi, piazzale Socrate, via Bernardino Telesio, via Bernardino Varisco;
- Local toponyms, e.g. piazza e via della Balduina, via di Casal Ciocci, via Massimi, clivo delle Mura Vaticane, via di Valle Aurelia, viale Vaticano.

== Places of interest ==
=== Civil buildings ===
- Agostino Gemelli University Policlinic.

=== Religious buildings ===
- Basilica of San Giuseppe al Trionfale
- Santa Maria delle Grazie a Via Trionfale, in Piazza Santa Maria delle Grazie.
- Santa Paola Romana, in Via Duccio Galimberti.
- San Pio X, in Piazza della Balduina.
- Gesù Divino Maestro, in Via Vittorio Montiglio.

=== Military buildings ===
- Forte Braschi.

=== Parks ===
- Pineto Regional Park.

== Politics ==
Cecilia D'Elia won the 2022 Rome Trionfale by-election.
