= Forte Monte Mario (Rome) =

- Part of Entrenched field of Rome
- 00136 Rome in Italy

Site information
- Open to the public: No

Location
- Coordinates: 41°55′27″N 12°27′05″E

Site history
- Built: 1877–1882
- Built by: Victor Emmanuel II
- In use: 1882–1919

Garrison information
- Occupants: Ministry of Defence

Forte Monte Mario is one of the 15 forts of Rome, built between 1877 and 1891. It is located in Rome (Italy), in the Quarter Q, XV Della Vittoria, within the Municipio I.

== History ==
Construction was started in 1877 and was finished in 1882. The fort covers a ground area of 8.4 ha (21 acres) and is situated at the 3rd km of Via Trionfale on Monte Mario, for which it is named.

It is currently occupied by military units.

== Biography ==
- Operare i forti. Per un progetto di riconversione dei forti militari di Roma. Rome: Gangemi Editore. 2010. ISBN 978-88-492-1777-3.
- Elvira Cajano (2006). Il sistema dei forti militari a Roma. Rome: Gangemi Editore. ISBN 978-88-492-1057-6.
- Michele Carcani (1883). I forti di Roma. Rome: Voghera Carlo tipografo di S.M.
- Giorgio Giannini (1998). I forti di Roma. Rome: Newton Compton Editori. ISBN 978-88-8183-895-0.
