= Forte Boccea (Rome) =

Building in Rome, Italy

- Part of Entrenched field of Rome
- 37 Via di Val Cannuta - 00167 Rome in Italy

Site information
- Open to the public: no

Location
- Coordinates: 41°54′08″N 12°25′02″E

Site history
- Built: 1877-1881
- Built by: Victor Emmanuel II

Garrison information
- Occupants: Ministry of Defence

Forte Boccea is one of the 15 forts of Rome, built in the period between 1877 and 1891 as a part of the "entrenched field of Rome".
It is located in Rome (Italy), in the Suburb S. IX Aurelio, within the Municipio XIII.

== History ==
The fort was built starting from 1877 and completed in 1881, on an area of 7.3 ha (18 acres), at the first km of Via di Boccea, from which it takes its name.

It was used as a military remand prison until 2005; in 2013 a resolution was approved, establishing its conversion into a park for cultural initiatives. General Mario Carloni was a prisoner there from 1946 to 19 May 1951.

== Bibliography ==
- Operare i forti. Per un progetto di riconversione dei forti militari di Roma. Rome: Gangemi Editore. 2010. ISBN 978-88-492-1777-3.
- Elvira Cajano (2006). Il sistema dei forti militari a Roma. Rome: Gangemi Editore. ISBN 978-88-492-1057-6.
- Michele Carcani (1883). I forti di Roma. Rome: Voghera Carlo tipografo di S.M.
- Giorgio Giannini (1998). I forti di Roma. Rome: Newton Compton Editori. ISBN 978-88-8183-895-0.
