= Monte Mario =

Hill in northwestern Rome, Italy

Coordinates: 41°55′30″N 12°27′6″E

- Hill of Rome
- Latin name: Mons Vaticanus, Clivus Cinnae
- Italian name: Monte Mario
- Rione: Prati
- Buildings: Villa Mellini, Villa del Pigneto, John Felice Rome Center
- Churches: Madonna del Rosario, Nostra Signora di Guadalupe a Monte Mario

Monte Mario (English: Mount Mario or Mount Marius) is the hill that rises in the north-west area of Rome (Italy), on the right bank of the Tiber, crossed by the Via Trionfale. It occupies part of Balduina, of the territory of Municipio Roma I (Roma Centro), of Municipio Roma XIV (Roma Monte Mario) and a small portion of Municipio Roma XV of Rome, thus including part of the Quarters Trionfale, Della Vittoria and Primavalle.

The same toponym also identifies the urban area which extends over the hill, close to Via Trionfale and the first stretch of Via di Torrevecchia, with the railway station of the same name.

It is the highest (139 m) hill in the town and, together with the Janiculum and the Pincius, one of the most scenic spots in the city, especially in the place called "Zodiac", which offers a south and west view of the main architectural monuments of the city, of the Vatican City, of the Alban Hills, of the Monti Tiburtini, of the Monti Prenestini and of the highest peaks of western central Apennines. Here, moreover, begins the longest Linear Park in Rome, which connects the town to the Parco di Monte Ciocci.

The location has been chosen as trigonometrical station in the Gauss–Boaga cartographic projection, giving rise to the datum Roma 40.

Although it is the highest hill in the modern city of Rome, Monte Mario is not one of the proverbial Seven Hills of Rome, being outside the boundaries of the ancient city.

== History ==
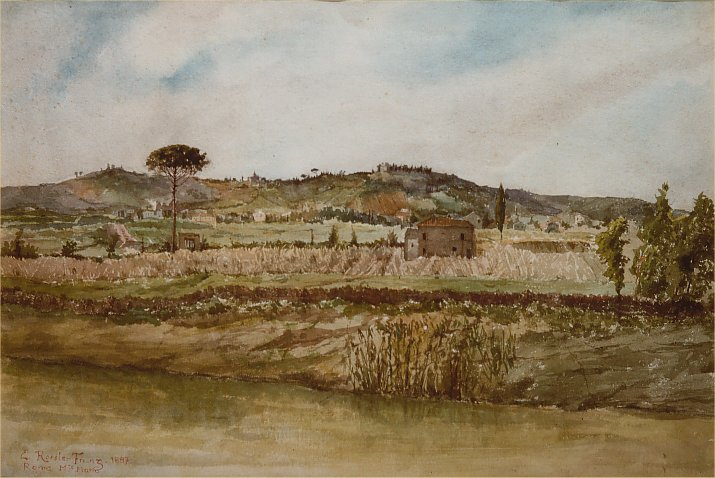
Prati di Castello and Monte Mario in a watercolor by Ettore Roesler Franz

Excavations carried out in the Cartoni estate, close to Monte Mario, have found a flint tool, some splinters of the same material and animal teeth. The remains date back to about 65,000 years ago and are the oldest finds in the area of Rome.

In the Middle Ages Monte Mario was located on the Via Francigena; pilgrims referred to it as Mons Gaudii (Latin for Mount of the Joy). The Via Francigena came from the Leonine City and continued towards La Giustiniana and then La Storta; then, having passed Isola Farnese, it continued north.

=== Origin of the name ===
The hill was known as Mons Vaticanus or Clivus Cinnae (from the name of the Consul Lucius Cornelius Cinna) during the ancient Roman period.

The current name, according to some theories, comes from Mario Mellini, a cardinal who owned a villa (since 1935 the seat of the Museo Astronomico e Copernicano of Rome) and several hamlets around the hill in the 15th century. A second hypothesis derives the name from the word mare (Italian for "sea"), referring to the fossil shells found there or to the fact that from some heights is it possible to see the sea. Finally, a third hypothesis is related to the medieval name of the hill, Monte Malo ("Bad Mountain"), due to the murder of the patrician Giovanni Crescenzio that took place there in 998.

== Description ==
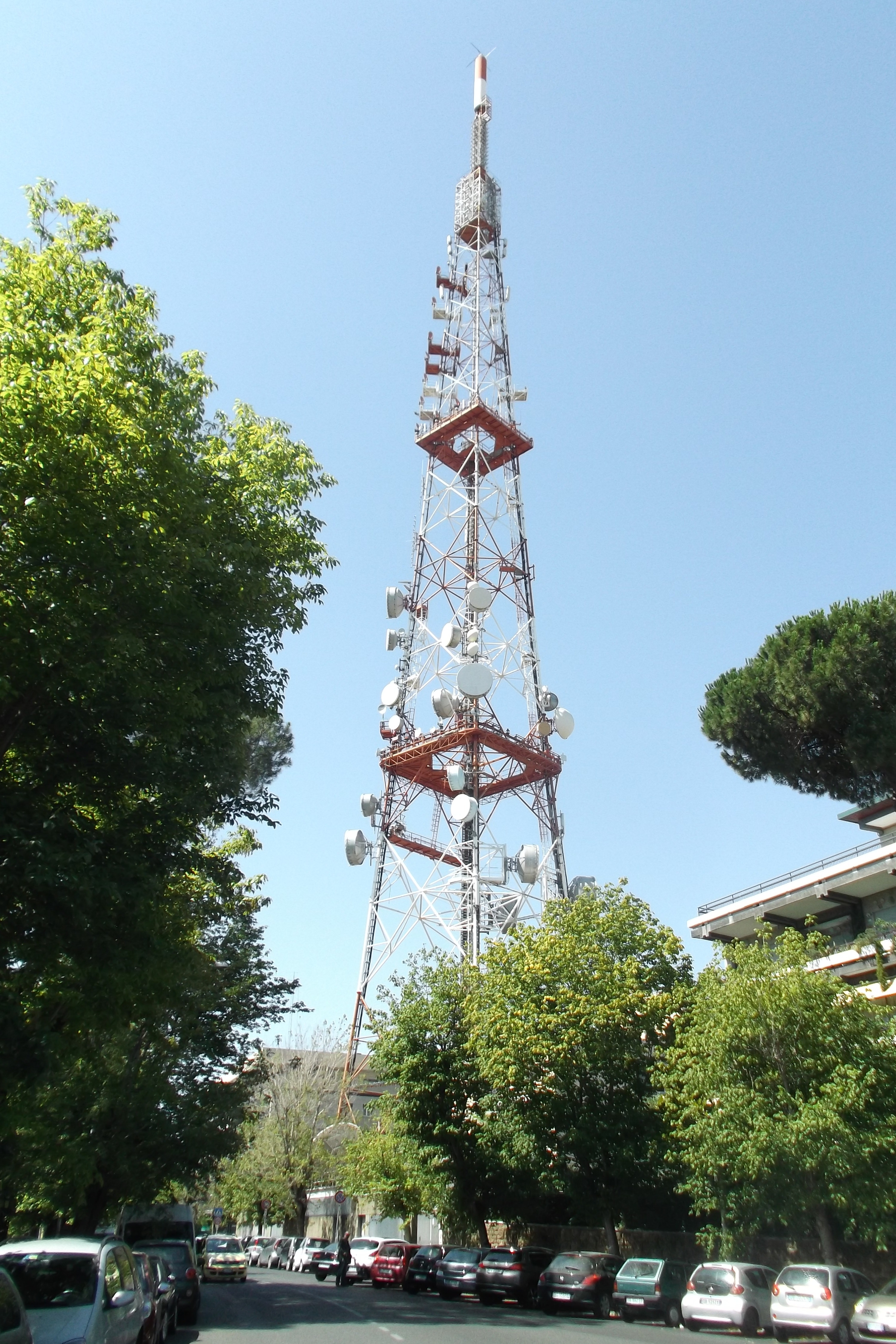
Radio-television antenna tower at the RAI broadcast and transmission centre in Monte Mario

The eastern part of the hill is a nature reserve and on the west side lies the now upmarket district of the same name. Atop one hill is the church and convent of the Madonna del Rosario. On the hilltop, in the site of the 15th-century Villa Mellini, rises the Monte Mario Observatory, part of the Rome Observatory, and the Museo Astronomico Copernicano. This location (12°27'8.4"E ) was used as the prime meridian (rather than Greenwich) for the maps of Italy until the 1960s. The side of the hill was the former site of the Villa del Pigneto, built by Pietro da Cortona. The ruins of the structure were razed in the 19th century.

The John Felice Rome Center, one of the four campuses of Loyola University Chicago, is located on the hill in Via Massimi.

The other settlements on the hill include:

- the headquarters and administrative offices of the National Institute for Astrophysics (INAF);
- the Transmitting center of Monte Mario, which houses the RAI repeaters;
- the Ospedale San Filippo Neri;
- the Faculty of Medicine and Surgery "Agostino Gemelli" of the Università Cattolica del Sacro Cuore and the Agostino Gemelli University Policlinic;
- the Roma Monte Mario weather station.

The built-up area of the hill include middle and high-bourgeois residential districts, such as Balduina, Trionfale, Belsito and Della Vittoria, as well as a more popular area, corresponding to the northernmost part of Primavalle.

The part of Della Vittoria Suburb overlooking Piazza Nostra Signora di Guadalupe is called Monte Mario Alto ("High Monte Mario") and develops close to Colle Sant'Agata, where, in the 1920s, a cooperative of post and telegraph workers built the first settlement. Other popular housing units were added in the 1930s, while the full edification was completed between the 1960s and the 1980s.

Monte Mario is also historically linked to the complex of the former Manicomio Santa Maria della Pietà, one of the largest and oldest mental health hospital in Europe.

=== Parks and green areas ===
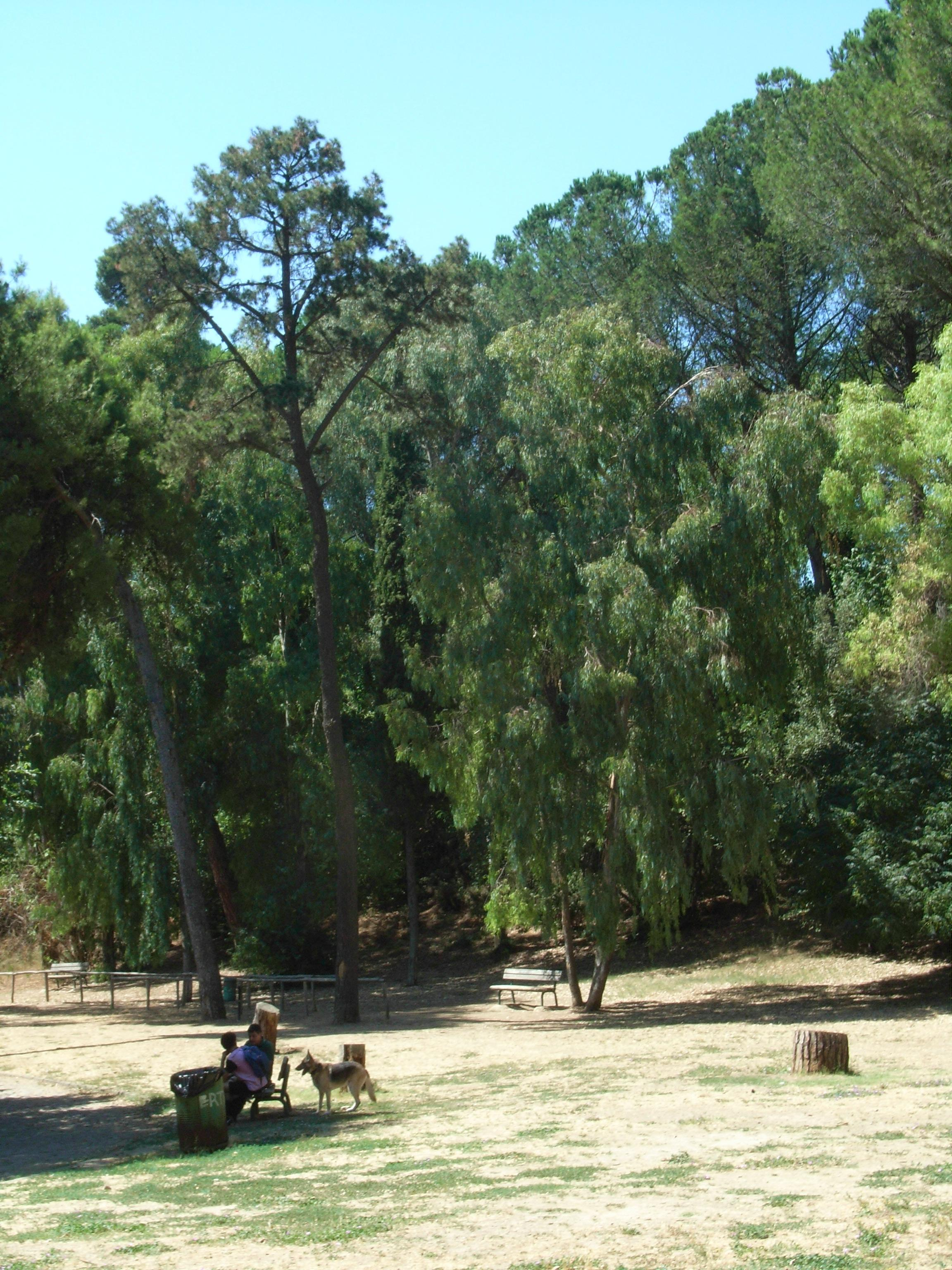
The park of Monte Mario

- Riserva naturale di Monte Mario: a nature reserve with an area of 204 hectares.
- Riserva naturale dell'Insugherata: a nature reserve that hosts most of the herbs surveyed in Rome, whose name derives from the abundant presence of cork oaks (Italian: "querce da sughero"). Its accesses are in the workshops of the Ospedale San Filippo Neri, in Via Andrea Angiulli and in Via Augusto Conti. It is an important biologic corridor between the urbanized area north of Rome and the Veii Regional Park, north-west of the Capital. The new delimitation of the Grande Raccordo Anulare has considerably reduced the protected area on the north side.
- Parco regionale urbano del Pineto: it is a nature reserve, established in 1987 by the municipality of Rome, which covers about 240 hectares and provides an integral reserve area of 26 hectares. It can be accessed from Via della Pineta Sacchetti and Via Proba Petronia.
- Linear Park: it occupies the route of the former Rome-Viterbo railway line and was inaugurated on June 14, 2014. It is the largest linear park of Rome and includes a pedestrian and cycle track linking the area of Monte Mario Railway Station, from the complex of Santa Maria della Pietà, to the Park of Monte Ciocci. The path, five kilometers long, has ten entrances integrated with the traditional mobility roads, intersections with four stations of FR3 railway line (Monte Mario, Gemelli, Balduina, Appiano), three play areas for children and a skating rink, turnstiles between one road and another, to prevent entry to cars and mopeds; moreover, ten standpipes and more than one hundred benches. The route has an average gradient of 1%.

== Historical re-enactment of Monte Mario Circuit ==
In 2004, thanks to Moto Guzzi Roma and under the patronage of the Lazio Region, of the Province of Rome and of Roma Capitale, the Monte Mario Circuit was reborn: it is a circuit crossed by Tazio Nuvolari with his Bianchi 350 (the legendary Blue Arrow) on February 24, 1925.

== See also ==
- Seven hills of Rome
- Aventine Hill (Aventino)
- Caelian Hill (Celio)
- Capitoline Hill (Capitolino)
- Cispian Hill (Cispio)
- Esquiline Hill (Esquilino)
- Janiculum Hill (Gianicolo)
- Oppian Hill (Oppio)
- Palatine Hill (Palatino)
- Pincian Hill (Pincio)
- Quirinal Hill (Quirinale)
- Vatican Hill (Vaticano)
- Velian Hill (Velia)
- Viminal Hill (Viminale)
