= Pineto Regional Park =

Protected area in Italy

Coordinates: 41°55′21″N 12°25′50″E

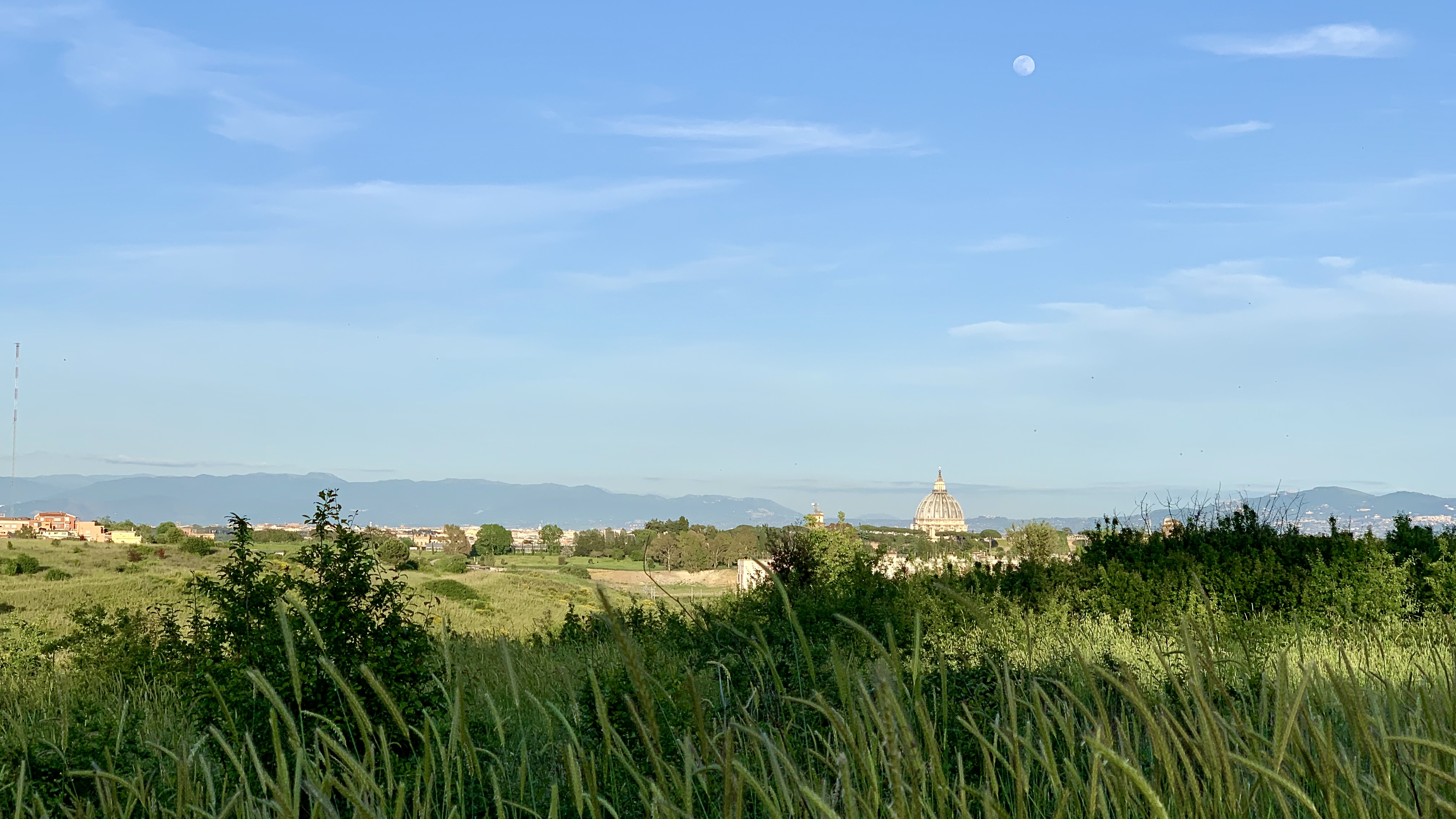
View over St Peters' from the park 2020

The Pineto Regional Park is a protected natural area of Lazio, Italy, instituted in 1987. It has an area of approximately 240 hectares, which includes Pineta Sacchetti. The park is in the northwest area of the city of Rome, in Municipio XIX, shared between the districts of Aurelio, Primavalle, and Trionfale.

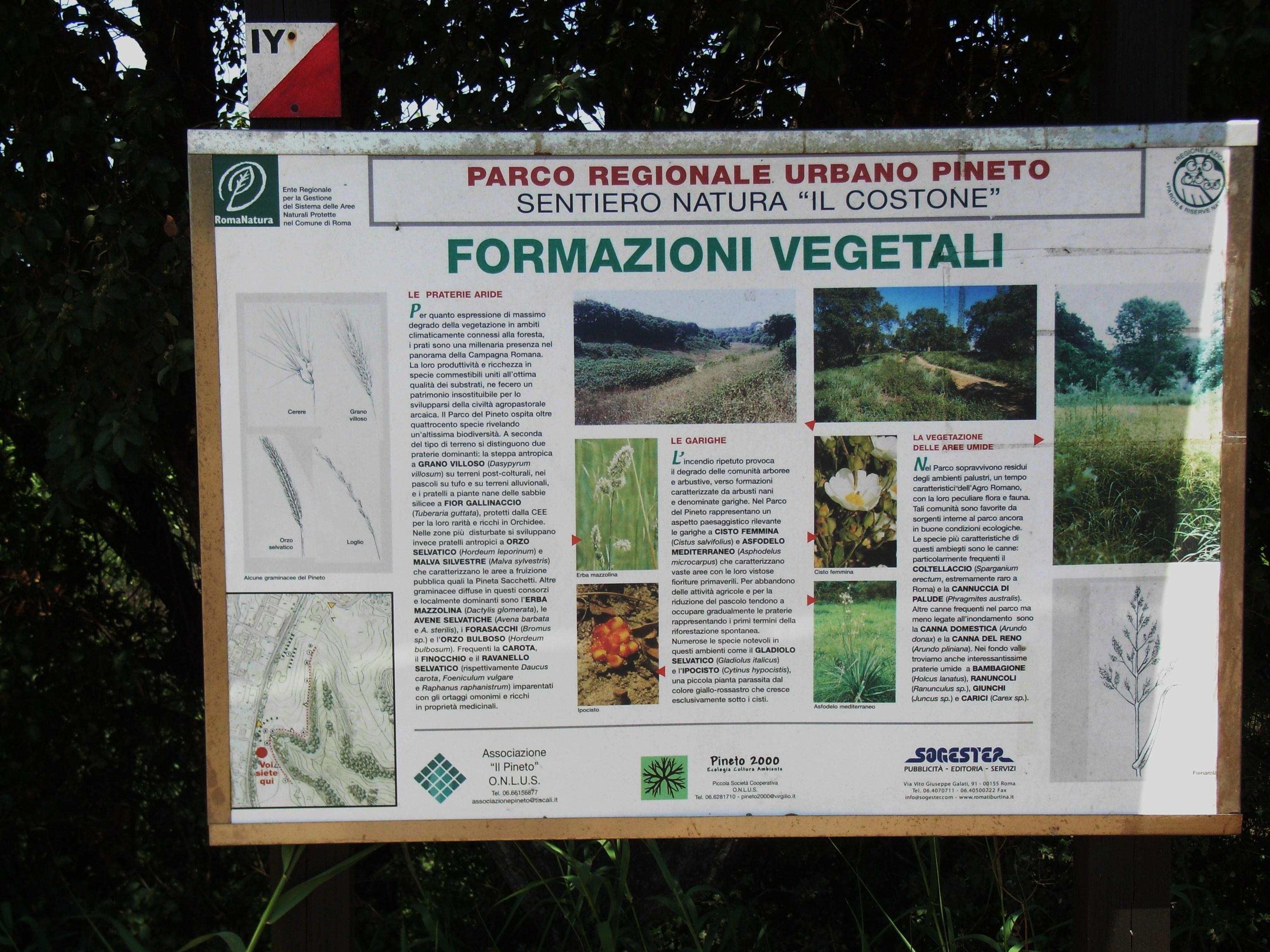
Information board outlining the protected plant zones in the park

The Parco del Pineto is a valley, the so-called “Valle dell’Inferno” (Valley of Hell), once extending to the Vatican walls and characterized by furnaces and limestone for the construction of St. Peter’s Basilica.

The cork oak, maple and birch trees are predominant here. Among the wildlife there are dormice and water-snakes. The park also contains traces of a previous ecological structure.

== See also ==
- Regional Park of Decima-Malafede
