= Antemnae =

Town and Roman colony of ancient Latium

Coordinates: 41.9379°N 12.5000°E

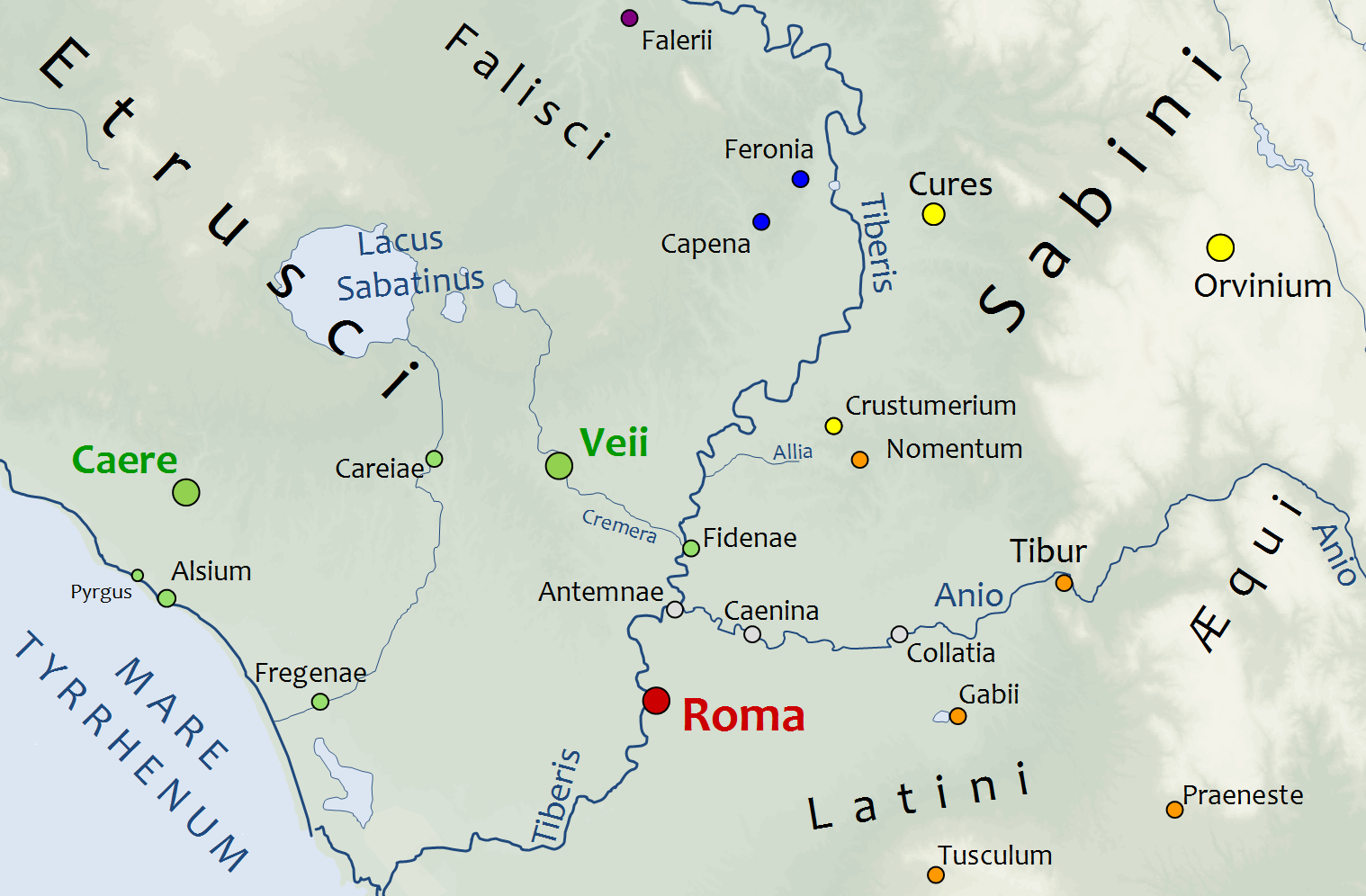

Antemnae was a town and Roman colony of ancient Latium in Italy. It was situated two miles north of ancient Rome on a hill (now Monte Antenne) commanding the confluence of the Aniene and the Tiber. It lay west of the later Via Salaria and now lies within a park in modern Rome.

== History ==
The name was said to have derived from Ante Amnes.

Antemnae was regarded as older than Rome. (Note: Priscian preserved a passage of Cato the Elder saying as much: Antemna etiam veterior est quam Roma.) In Rome's founding myths, its people, sometimes regarded as Sabines, were among those who attended the festival of Neptune Equester organized by Romulus to supply wives for the Roman men. The abduction—known as the Rape of the Sabine Women—was said to have prompted an invasion by the Antemnates. The Romans repulsed them and then conquered their town. The Fasti Triumphales placed Romulus's triumph for the victory in 752 BC. As it was the home of Romulus's own wife Hersilia (later deified as "Hora"), she convinced her husband to make the locals Roman citizens, effectively granting it colony status.

The settlement was subsequently of little importance, although it was the site of the Samnites' surrender to Sulla in 82 BC during the civil war between the Cinna-Marius faction and Sulla, and of one of Alaric's encampments in the year before the Visigoth's sack of Rome in AD 410.

In the 19th century, no ruins were known to have survived, but an excavation undertaken during the construction of Italy's Forte Antenne discovered wells, several huts, a cistern, and traces of the defensive walls of the ancient town around 1880. The remains of a villa from the end of the Republic were also found.

== Sources ==
- Baynes, T. S., ed. (1878), "Antemnæ" , Encyclopædia Britannica, vol. 2 (9th ed.), New York: Charles Scribner's Sons, p. 102
- Cifani, Gabriele (2008), Architettura romana arcaica: edilizia e società tra monarchia e repubblica (in Italian), L'Erma di Bretschneider, ISBN 978-88-8265-444-3
- Quilici, Lorenzo; Gigli, Stefania Quilici (1978), Latium Vetus: Antemnae, CNR. (in Italian)
