= Gauss–Boaga projection =

Coordinates: 41.9244°N 12.4521°E

The Gauss–Boaga projection is a map projection used in Italy that uses a Hayford ellipsoid.

== Naming and History ==
The projection is named after Carl Friedrich Gauss and Giovanni Boaga. It was created by Giovanni Boaga in the 1940s who was at that time the head of the Istituto Geografico Militare. The projection method is a slight variant of the Gauss–Krüger series development for the ellipsoidal transverse Mercator projection. Like the closely related UTM, the Gauss–Boaga scales the projection down so that the central meridian has a scale factor of 0.9996 rather than 1.0.

== Specifications ==
The grid system is based on the Roma 1940 datum, whose origin lies at Monte Mario near Rome. The coordinates at this point were measured 1940 as φ = 41° 55' 25".51 and λ = 12° 27' 08".40.

== Subdivisions ==
The projection is split into a western (EPSG:3003) and eastern zone (EPSG:3004). The western zone is also referred to as Monte Mario / Italy zone 1 or Rome 1940 / Italy zone 1. It is used in Italy on- and-off shore west of the 12 °E longitude. The eastern zone is also referred to as Monte Mario / Italy zone 2 , Rome 1940 / Italy zone 2. It is used on- and off-shore east of the 12 °E longitude.
