= Forte Antenne (Rome) =

- Part of Entrenched field of Rome
- Viale del Forte Antenne, 12 - 00199 Rome in Italy
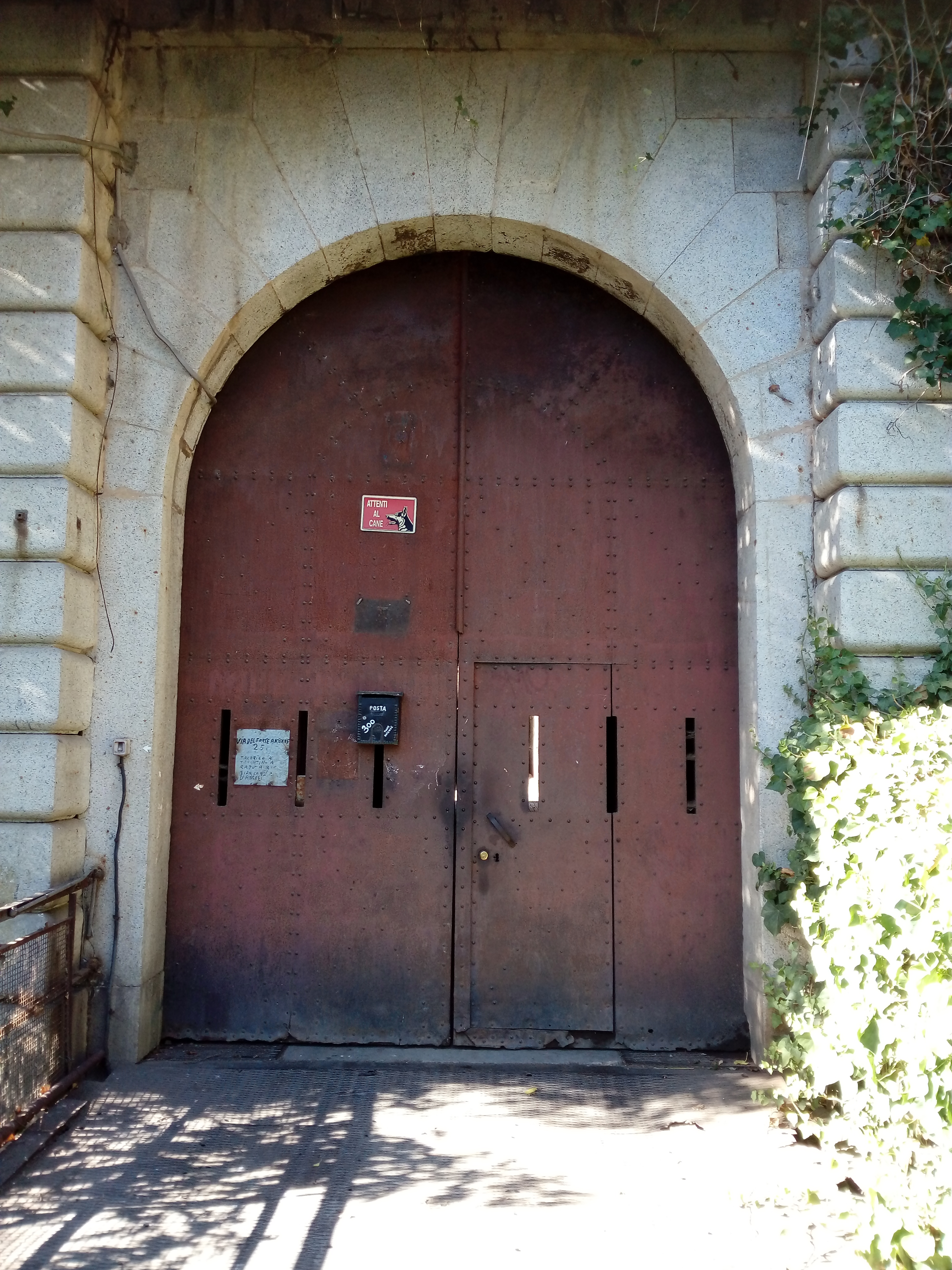
- Forte Antenne, main entrance

Site information
- Open to the public: no
- Condition: in disuse

Location
- Coordinates: 41°56′15″N 12°30′02″E
- Area: 2.5 ha (6.2 acres)

Site history
- Built: 1882–1891
- Built by: Umberto I of Italy
- In use: 1884–1946

Forte Antenne is one of the 15 forts, built in Rome (Italy) in the period between 1877 and 1891.
It is located in the Q. II Parioli, within the Municipio II, inside Villa Ada.

The fort occupies the site of the city of Antemnae, conquered by Romulus.

== History ==
The fort, which covers an area of 2.5 ha (6.2 acres), was built starting from 1882 and finished in 1891 on Monte Antenne, from which it takes its name, near the confluence of the river Aniene with the Tiber.

Until the 1940s it was used as a depot of the Signal Corps and then decommissioned. A part of the fort was taken over by the Municipality of Rome, which only partially used it; the remainder was occupied by military units.

In 1958, on the occasion of the upcoming 1960 Rome Olympics, the public ownership sold it to the Municipality of Rome in order to use it as a camping site, which however was built only in the surrounding park, since some private residences had already been built within the fort.

According to the most recent news, the fort and its complex should be part of a recovery plan, aimed at transforming it in a hotel or in a branch office of the nearby LUISS University.

In accordance with the Code for Cultural and Landscape Heritage, the fort is a protected area under Ministerial Decree August 6, 2008.

== Transports ==
- Railway station (Campi Sportivi)

== Bibliography ==
- Operare i forti. Per un progetto di riconversione dei forti militari di Roma. Rome: Gangemi Editore. 2010. ISBN 978-88-492-1777-3.
- Elvira Cajano (2006). Il sistema dei forti militari a Roma. Rome: Gangemi Editore. ISBN 978-88-492-1057-6.
- Michele Carcani (1883). I forti di Roma. Rome: Voghera Carlo tipografo di S.M.
- Giorgio Giannini (1998). I forti di Roma. Rome: Newton Compton Editori. ISBN 978-88-8183-895-0.
