= Giovanni Boaga =

Italian mathematician and geodesy professor (1902–1961)

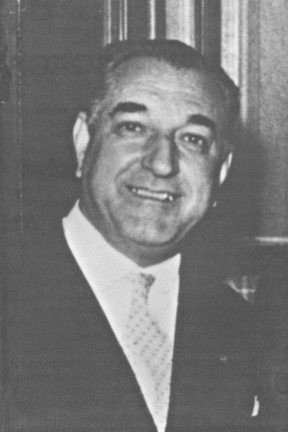
Giovanni Boaga

Giovanni Boaga (February 28, 1902 – November 17, 1961) was an Italian mathematician and geodesy professor.

He was born in Trieste and died in Tripoli, Libya. His Gauss-Boaga Projection is the standard projection used in Italian topography by the Istituto Geografico Militare.
