= Tessera del tifoso =

Pass adopted by Italian football teams

The Tessera del tifoso (English: Supporter's ID card) is an identity document introduced in 2009-2010 by the Italian Ministry of the Interior to identify fans and supporters of specific association football clubs. This was introduced in order to counter the level of hooligan violence during games, and was made compulsory during the 2010/2011 season, despite not yet being approved by Parliament.

The identity card identifies fans as supporters of specific teams and are checked by police or security at the stadium entry. In addition, it doubles as a point collection scheme whereby fans can cash in points at banks for season and away tickets.

The tessera has been criticized by fans' organizations, ultras, consumer protection NGOs and pro-privacy groups for a variety of reasons, including being blamed for a reduction in ticket sales while being unable to prevent hooligan violence.

When A.S. Roma decided to acquiesce to fan demands from MyRoma (the AS Roma Supporters’ Trust) and sell tickets without tesseras, it faced obstruction from the National Observatory on Sports Events, a body of the Interior Ministry. Similar attempts to do the same at Cagliari, Taranto and Padova clubs have also faced stiff opposition from the National Observatory.
