= Balduina =

Coordinates: 41°55′13″N 12°26′31″E

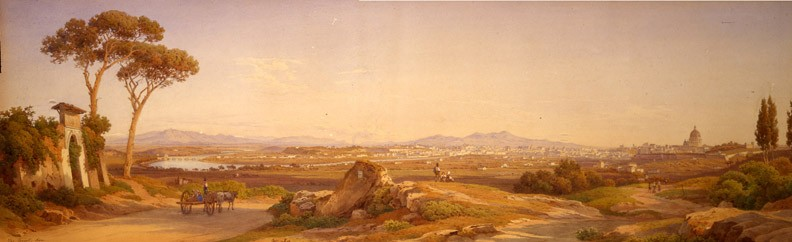
View of Rome from Via Trionfale, close to the Madonna del Rosario convent. On the left the arch that leads to Villa Mellini, now an observatory. Oil painting by Salomon Corrodi, 1876

Balduina is an urban area that belongs to the Municipio XIX of the comune of Rome, Italy, and to the fourteenth borough of the city, (Q.XIV, called Trionfale). Situated at 139 metres above sea level on the southern side of Monte Mario, Balduina is the highest part of Rome. The population is 42,000.

== Geography ==
The area of Balduina is marked on the southern side by the green "cliffs" of the hill forming a natural entrance just at the corner of Via Antonio Labriola and Via Gualtiero Serafino through Viale delle Medaglie d’Oro in a place known at the beginning of the 20th century as Dogana della Balduina (the customs house of Balduina); It is bounded to the west by the FL3 railway that runs from Rome to Cesano and Viterbo, a boundary overtaken by some housing in the Monte Ciocci area, here facing the Valle Aurelia, known as "Valle dell’Inferno" Balduina is bounded to the north by some convents and villas on the Via Trionfale, a historic road that leads north towards Via Cassia. Finally, to east the neighbourhood is framed by the Via Trionfale itself, which runs down from Villa Stuart to Borghetto S. Lazzaro and is the boundary with Prati di Castello.

Until the beginning of the twentieth century "Balduina" and "Monte Mario" were used interchangeably and the neighbourhood was surrounded by open fields with no specific name. Subsequently, the name "Monte Mario" slowly "moved" (in an urban sense) towards the areas of S. Onofrio and Case Nostre, marking these areas on the plateau where today stands the railway station of the same name.

== History ==
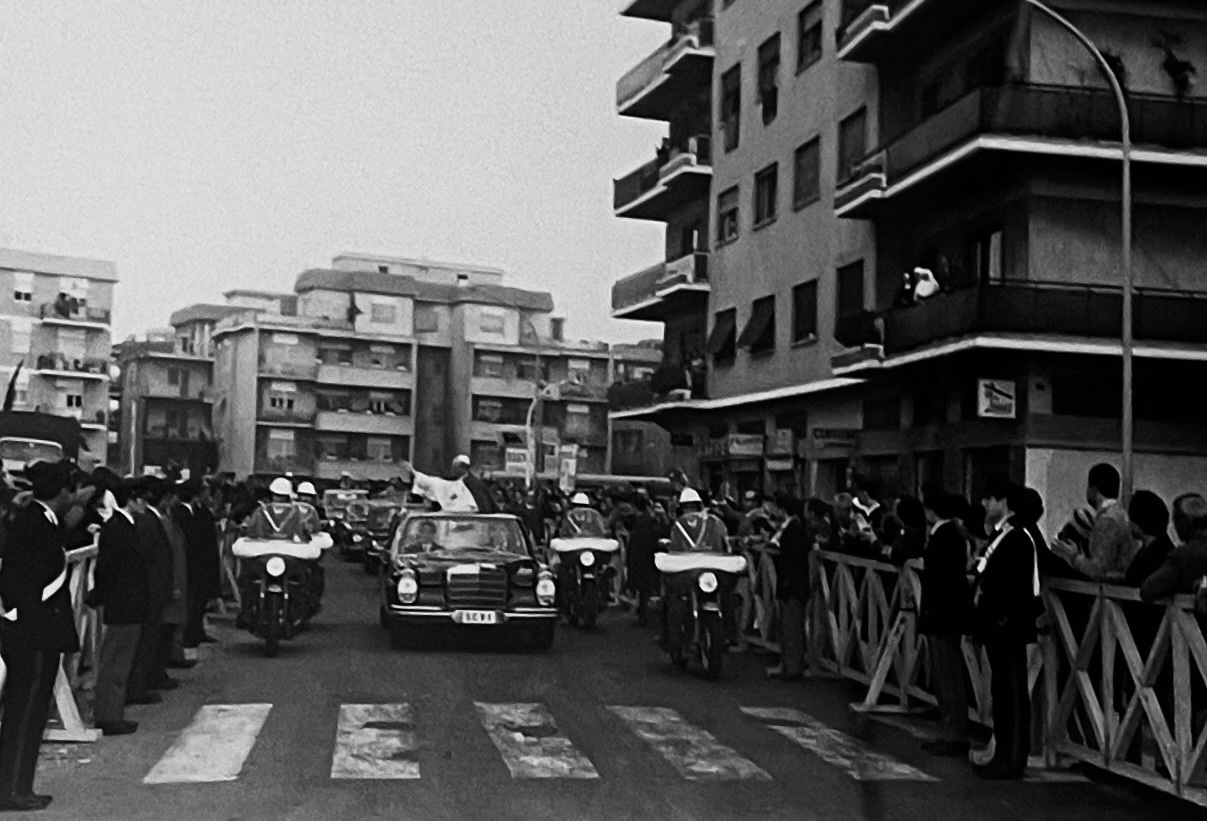
Pope Paul VI greets the faithful of the Balduina neighborhood in Rome

Balduina is named after Baldovino del Monte, brother of Pope Julius III del Monte (1550–1555) and owner of those lands on the southern part of Monte Mario.

The modern neighbourhood started around 1909 with some elegant villas built on Viale delle Medaglie d’Oro and Viale Tito Livio.

A much bigger expansion started just after World War II with the typical Roman Palazzine, four or five-storey buildings, split in some apartments, nine as a base.

== Districts ==
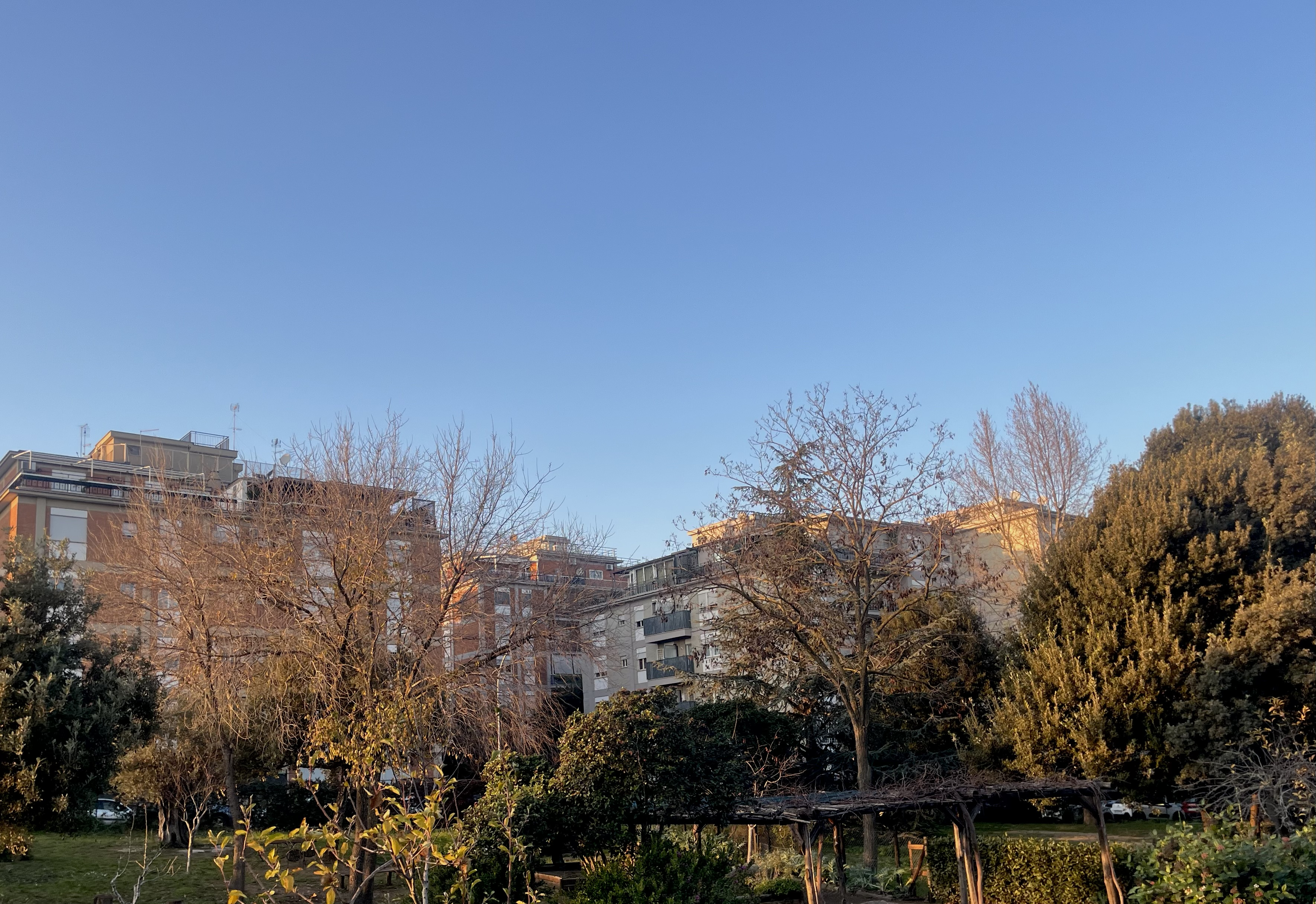
Balduina

Balduina is divided into:

- the central part of Balduina, the core of the neighbourhood, is centred on Piazza Balduina;
- Belsito, to the north, is marked by Piazzale delle Medaglie D'Oro and the green area of Parco della Vittoria, Villa Stuart and the green areas around the Waldorf Astoria Rome Cavalieri;
- Monte Ciocci, named after the Casale Ciocci mansion (a work by Baldassarre Peruzzi), faces the Vatican Hill and is the home of the old brickworks which were created to provide building materials for Saint Peter’s Basilica. Streets here are named after Latin writers.

== Places of interest ==
- The 120,000 m² Parco di Monte Mario
- The Dominican monastery of the Madonna del Rosario that hosts an icon of the Virgin previously placed in S.Maria in Trastevere.
- The observatory, opened in 1938 in the Villa Mellini.
- The John Felice Rome Center, a campus of Loyola University Chicago, hosts approximately 200 American University Students at any given time.

=== Historical villas and mansions ===
- Casale Ciocci, built by Baldassarre Peruzzi in the sixteenth century.
- Villa Stuart, built in the seventeenth century and owned by Emmeline Stuart-Wortley and Lord Allen since the nineteenth century.
- Villa Monte Mario, owned in the nineteenth century by Bernard Blumensthil, an Alsacian negotiator for the Holy See.
- Villa Miani, a mansion planned at the beginning of the twentieth century to host the American Methodist Church University.

=== Churches ===
- Santa Paola Romana, in Via Duccio Galimberti.
- Santa Maria Stella Matutina, in Via Lucilio.
- San Pio X, in Via Attilio Friggeri.
- San Fulgenzio, in Via della Balduina.

== Transport ==
FL3: a regional and urban railway line linked to the major Trastevere and Ostiense train stations and to the Linea A metro with a junction at Valle Aurelia.

The bus lines 990, 913, 911 and 985 serve the area.
