= Giacomo Barzellotti =

Italian philosopher (1826-1895)

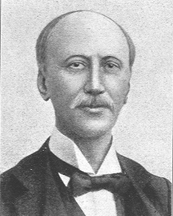
Giacomo Barzellotti

Giacomo Barzellotti (7 July 1844 – 19 September 1917) was an Italian philosopher and senator of the Kingdom of Italy.

== Biography ==
Giacomo Barzellotti was born in Florence in Tuscany. His father, Gaspero, was a doctor and Teresa Benvenuti, the daughter of Pietro Benvenuti, a painter. He is related to the Tuscan physician also named Giacomo Barzellotti (1768–1839) first obtained in 1866 a doctorate in literature and philosophy from the University of Pisa. He then served for a year as professor of philosophy in the Royal Liceo Dante of Florence during 1867–1877. During 1879–1880, he served as docent at the University of Rome. In Rome, he met Terenzio Mamiani, who was teaching philosophy. He then gained a post as ordinary professor of the cathedra of moral philosophy at the Royal University of Pavia, where he taught during 1881–1883. he obtained a teaching position in 1886 at the University of Rome, and in 1887 at the University of Naples. In 1897, he returned to Rome where he taught the history of philosophy for over a decade.

He was made a member of the Royal Academy of the Lincei in Rome. He was inducted in the Ordini cavallereschi italiani, and awarded a badge of the Legion of Honour by France. He married Antonietta Tabarrini, the daughter of Marco Tabarrini, Italian senator and president of the Council of State.

== Selected works ==
- Delle dottrine filosofiche nei libri di Cicerone, 1867;
- La morale nella filosofia positiva, Florence: M. Cellini, 1871; translated into English in 1878 as The Ethics of Positivism;
- La rivoluzione e la letteratura in Italia: avanti e dopo gli anni 1848 e 1849, Florence: Successori Le Monnier, 1875;
- La nuova scuola del Kant e la filosofia scientifica contemporanea in Germania, Rome: Tip. Barbera, 1880;
- David Lazzaretti di Arcidosso (detto il santo), Bologna: Zanichelli, 1884 (nuova ed. con il titolo: Monte Amiata e il suo profeta, Milan: Fratelli Treves, 1909);
- Santi, solitari, filosofi: saggi psicologici, 2ª ed., Bologna: Nicola Zanichelli, 1886;
- Studi e ritratti, Bologna: Zanichelli, 1893;
- Ippolito Taine, Rome : Loescher, 1895;
- Dal Rinascimento al Risorgimento (with a speech by Giosuè Carducci), 2nd. ed., 1909;
- L'opera storica della filosofia, Palermo: R. Sandron, 1918 (published posthumously).

== Biography ==
- Troilo, E. (1917). "Giacomo Barzellotti". Nuova Antologia. 275: 286–292.
- Cappelletti, Virginia (1965). "Giacomo Barzellotti". Dizionario Biografico degli Italiani (in Italian). Vol. 7: Bartolucci–Bellotto. Rome: Istituto dell'Enciclopedia Italiana. ISBN 978-88-12-00032-6.
