= Primavalle =

Coordinates: 41°55′32.81″N 12°24′57.95″E

- Quartiere of Rome
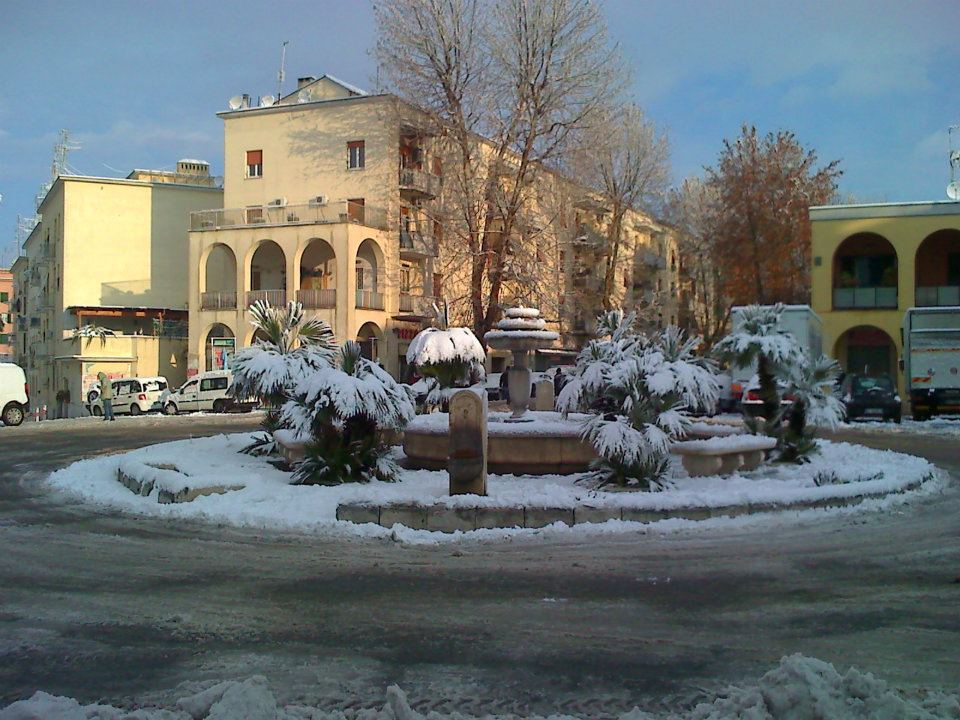
- Piazza Clemente XI and its distinctive fountain

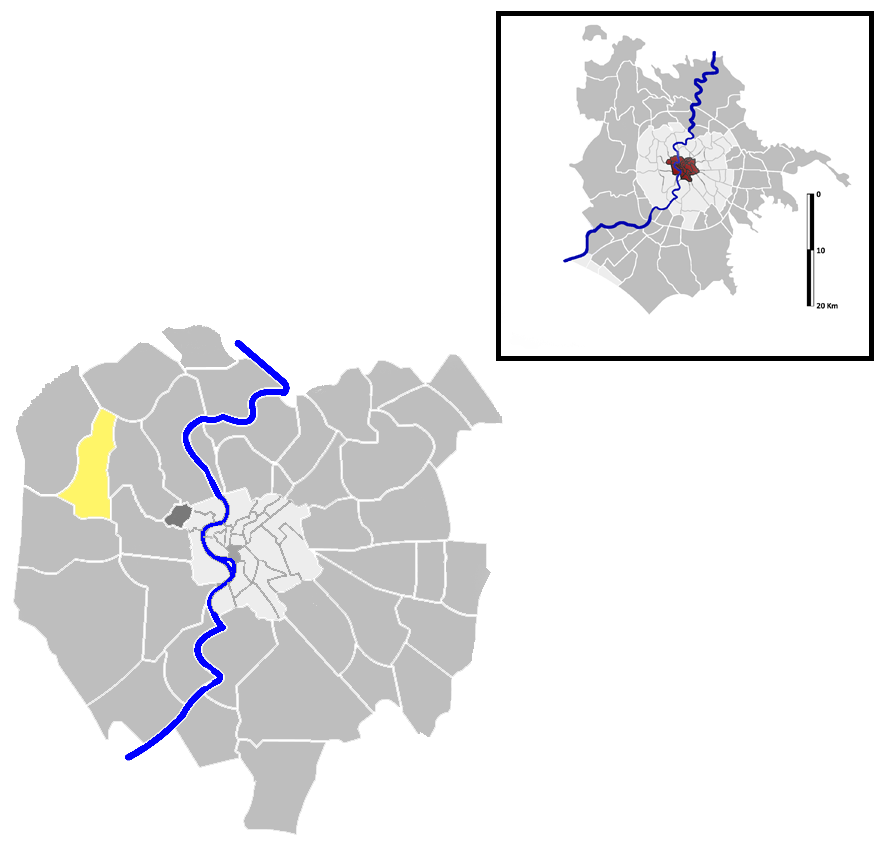
- Position of the quartiere within the city
- Country: Italy
- Region: Lazio
- Province: Rome
- Comune: Rome

Area
  - Total: 1.9176 sq mi (4.9666 km^{2})

Population (2016)
  - Total: 75,468
  - Density: 39,355/sq mi (15,195.1/km^{2})
- Time zone: UTC+1 (CET)
  - Summer (DST): UTC+2 (CEST)

Primavalle is the 27th quartiere of Rome, identified by the initials Q. XXVII. It is part of the Municipio XIV.

== History ==
Thanks to several archaeological discoveries, the first settlements in the area can be dated back to 1st century BC: a structure of that period, that was part of a thermal bath, was found between Via Pietro Bembo and Via Pietro Gasparri, belonging to a villa rustica, in the little valley where the Fosso della Favara used to flow; and in 1912 a big dolium was discovered during the broadening of Via della Pineta Sacchetti. This has led historians to hypothesize that the area was inhabited from the 1st century AD mainly with farms and agricultural estates supplying the market of the Urbs. In the area where is now located the Agostino Gemelli University Policlinic a villa or a farm should have existed, as during the refurbishment of an adjoining plot of land tufa and travertine blocks have been found. Also noteworthy is a section of aqueduct built by Emperor Trajan in AD 109, restored by Pope Paul V in the 17th century, and today incorporated into newer buildings and largely buried. During the Roman Empire period, the area currently occupied by the neighborhood lay within the fifth mile from Rome, an imaginary line within which important rural festivals were celebrated. After the fall of the Roman Empire, the area was used for cultivation and was largely uninhabited, forming part of the vast Agro Romano, with scattered huts and buildings.

In the Middle Ages, the area was comprised within the vast estate called Casalia or Casalia Turris Vetulae (in Latin, Farmhouses or Farmhouses of the Old Tower), a large property owned by St. Peter's Basilica that included a number of adjacent neighborhoods, like Mimmoli, Sant'Agata, Palmarola, Mazzalupo, Sant'Andrea, Casal del Marmo and Pedica della Marinetta. From 1505 to 1509, the Vatican Chapter divided the estate in 8 minor plots, amongst which the Tenuta di Torrevecchia and the Tenuta di Primavalle.

While the toponym Torrevecchia can be dated back to 1390, deriving from the presence of a medieval tower that no longer exists, the name Primavalle appears for the first time in the Mappa della Campagna romana al tempo di Paolo III ("Map of the Roman Campagna at the time of Paul III"), a map intended for hunters, drawn in 1547 by Eufrosino Della Volpaia, and in other old maps.

The entire area was used by the nobility as a hunting estate, as evidenced, for example, by a guide drawn up in 1548 by Domenico Boccamazza, the Pope's gamekeeper, who described an itinerary covering a wide area between the Pineta Sacchetti and present-day Torresina.

Following to the 1866–7 laws on the liquidation of the ecclesiastical assets, the Vatican Chapter alienated the Tenuta di Torrevecchia in 1875 and later, to avoid expropriations, quickly ceded the Tenuta di Primavalle (the territory of Torrevecchia) to private individuals, who, however, did not urbanize the area, which remained rural until the first half of the 20th century. The area, that at the time was uninhabited and was used for military drills, was acquired in 1923 by ALBA (Società Anonima Laziale di Bonifica Agraria), a construction company that began to build little houses, mixed with vegetable gardens and more modest rural buildings, all surrounded by the green of the near Pineta Sacchetti (a large pinewood owned by the noble Sacchetti family). Alongside the main road, the very long Via del Pidocchio (later called Via di Primavalle, which in 1956 was divided into Via Cardinale Garampi, Via Cardinal Passionei, and Via Pio IX, and corresponding to the present-day Via Pio IX and Via Cardinal Garampi), a large square had been built, Piazza di Primavalle, which was dedicated to Pope Pius IX in 1956. Alongside Via del Pidocchio already stood the Casale di Primavalle, the Vaccheria di Primavalle, and Piazza di Primavalle (renamed Piazza Pio IX in 1956). Via del Pidocchio connected them to Via Boccea. A "garden city" type of development was envisaged for the area, but this did not take place, as in the post-World War II period many new buildings were constructed without adequate regulation, drastically altering the original appearance of the area.

In 1923, by adapting and renovating the old disused Casale di Primavalle, located beyond Forte Braschi, the Sisters of the Congregation of the Poor Daughters of Saint Joseph Calasanctius of Blessed Celestina Donati founded the "Oasi di Primavalle", which welcomed girls between the ages of 3 and 10, daughters of prisoners and orphans; over time the building also became a school. Later, other religious congregations established institutions there, such as the Ursuline Sisters of Mother Urszula Ledochowska, but above all the Opera Don Calabria which, already entrusted with the administration of the Church of San Filippo Neri at the Pineta Sacchetti, with Father Isaia Filippi built in 1933 the small Church of Santa Maria Assunta e San Giuseppe a Primavalle (renovated and expanded in the 1950s) in what is now Piazza Clemente XI.

In the same years, restoring and readjusting an old abandoned farmhouse, the nuns of the Congregation of the Poor Daughters of San Giuseppe Calasanzio established the Oasi di Primavalle, a social facility addressed to orphans and inmates' children, that later became a school. Later, other religious congregations established institutes in the borough, especially the Congregation of the Ursulines of the Agonizing Heart of Jesus and the Poor Servants of Divine Providence: the latter is in charge of the church of Santa Maria Assunta e San Giuseppe in Primavalle.

When, during the fascist period, several new suburbs (the so-called borgate) were planned to house the population that was moving from the center of Rome after the demolitions provided by the 1931 city plan, a borgata was built near the Pineta Sacchetti, taking advantage of the preexisting roads and buildings. Primavalle was intended to host about 5,000 people coming from the areas where Via della Conciliazione (then under construction with the demolition of the Spina di Borgo) and Via dei Fori Imperiali had been built, and from Porta Metronia and Monte Caprino.

The new borgata also reorganized the precarious situation of many agricultural laborers from the nearby Fogaccia and Porcareccia estates, who had been housed in shacks that had already raised hygienic and social concerns within the Governatorate in the 1920s. The construction of the new settlement officially began in 1936 under the Istituto Fascista Case Popolari (IFCP, Fascist Institute for Public Housing). Previously, the Governatorate of Rome had built a public dormitory (which currently houses the Municipal Library and several municipal offices) alongside the huts and poor houses that residents had constructed independently using improvised materials and lacking all services. The area was particularly poor and still after the Second World War social services were scarce. Primavalle was located in an area largely isolated from the city center, like the other official borgate, with the additional disadvantage of difficult connections due to the depressions in the terrain that gave the area its name.

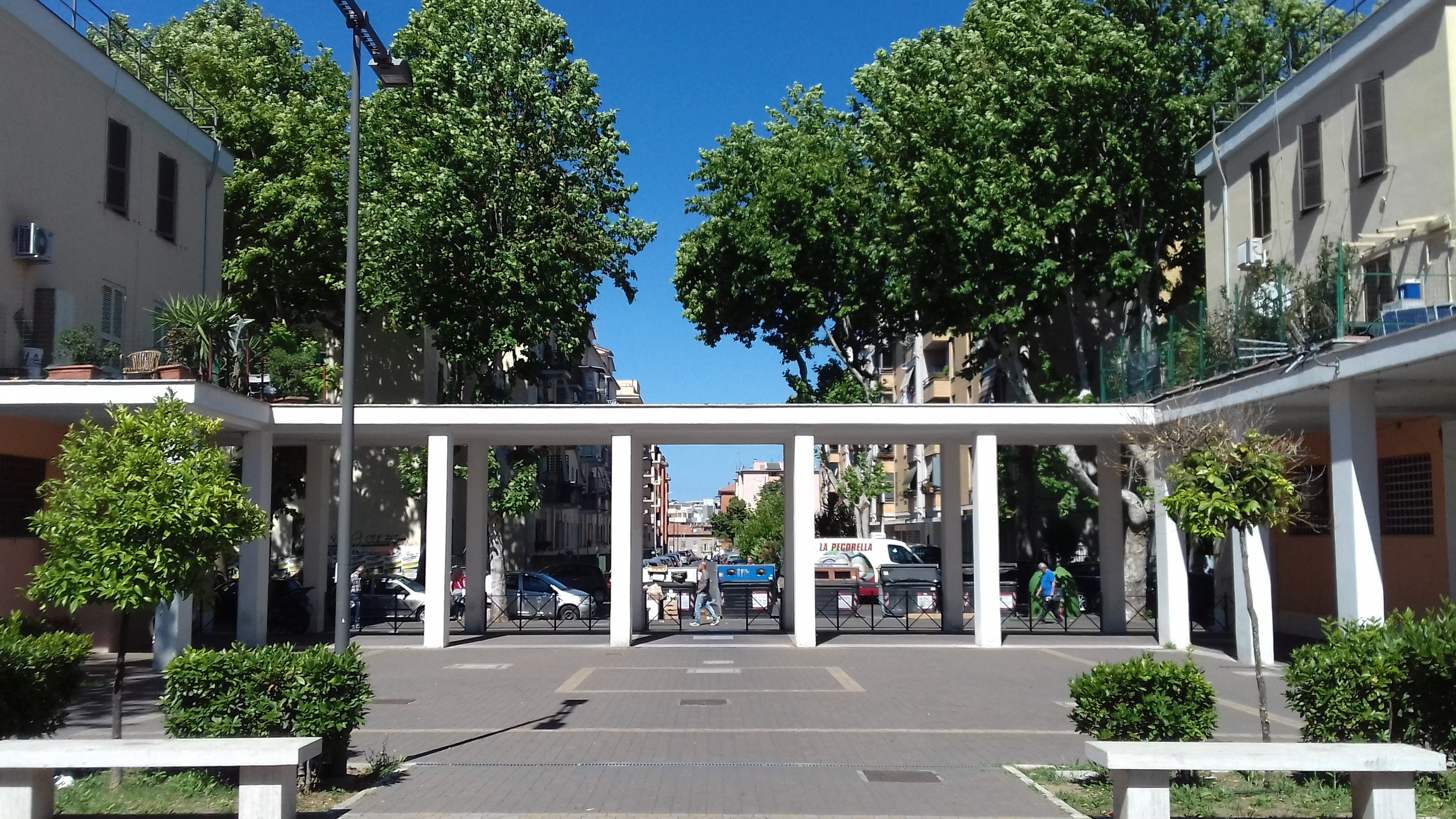
Courtyard of the public housing in Via Federico Borromeo

The borgata was inaugurated in 1939, developing along the route of Via della Borgata di Primavalle (the current Via Federico Borromeo), with the linear structure typical of the Fascist architecture, economical and essential in style, and in some buildings was associated with Rationalism. From the time of its construction, characteristic features of the new borgata were the extreme poverty of its inhabitants and the lack of public services, especially connections with the city center, a situation that persisted for many years after the Second World War.

On 4 December 1947, following a demonstration coinciding with a general strike, a group of workers residing in Primavalle returned to the neighborhood to continue protesting in front of the police station. Police officers responded with violence, firing at chest height and killing the twenty-four-year-old communist activist Giuseppe Tanas.

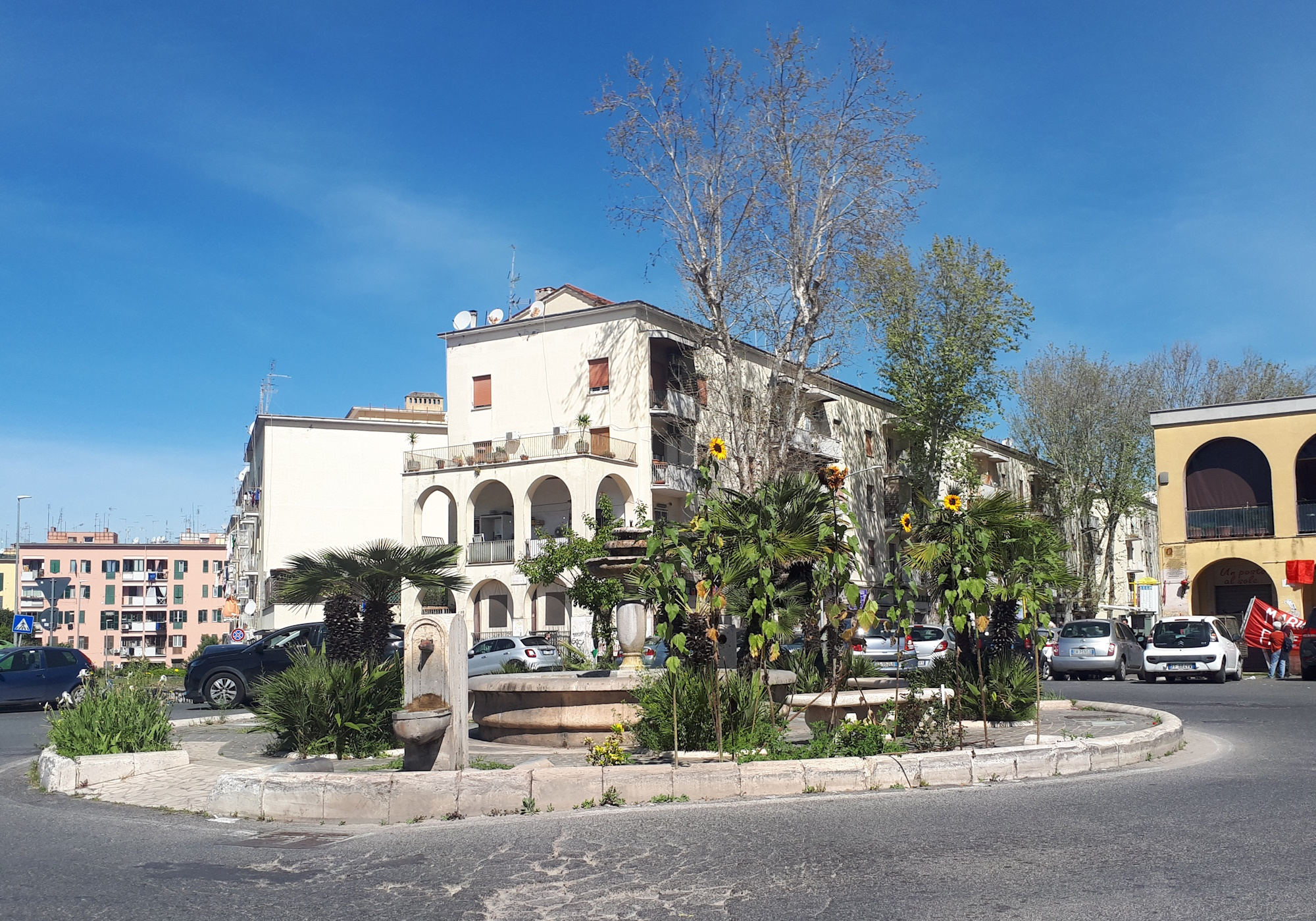
Piazza Clemente XI with the historic fountain

In the 1950s, the area became known for the murder of a child, Annarella Bracci, for which the farm laborer Lionello Egidi was initially accused. National news outlets followed the case with intense interest, as the murder occurred in an extremely degraded and impoverished environment. Egidi was later declared innocent by the courts, and the crime has never been solved.

On 31 January 1953, the Mayor of Rome, Rebecchini, and Bishop Micara inaugurated the branch of the Peschiera-Capore Aqueduct. The fountain at the center of Piazza Clemente XI, inaugurated for the occasion, is of uncertain origin, as it is not known whether it was a structure created for the event, an imitation of a fountain that remained in Borgo, or the reuse of a fountain from Borgo. In some Fascist-era footage of the inauguration of the open-air Principe di Piemonte school on Via Nicola Salvi, near the Colosseum, a fountain very similar to that in the square can be seen. The school in question was demolished in 1940.

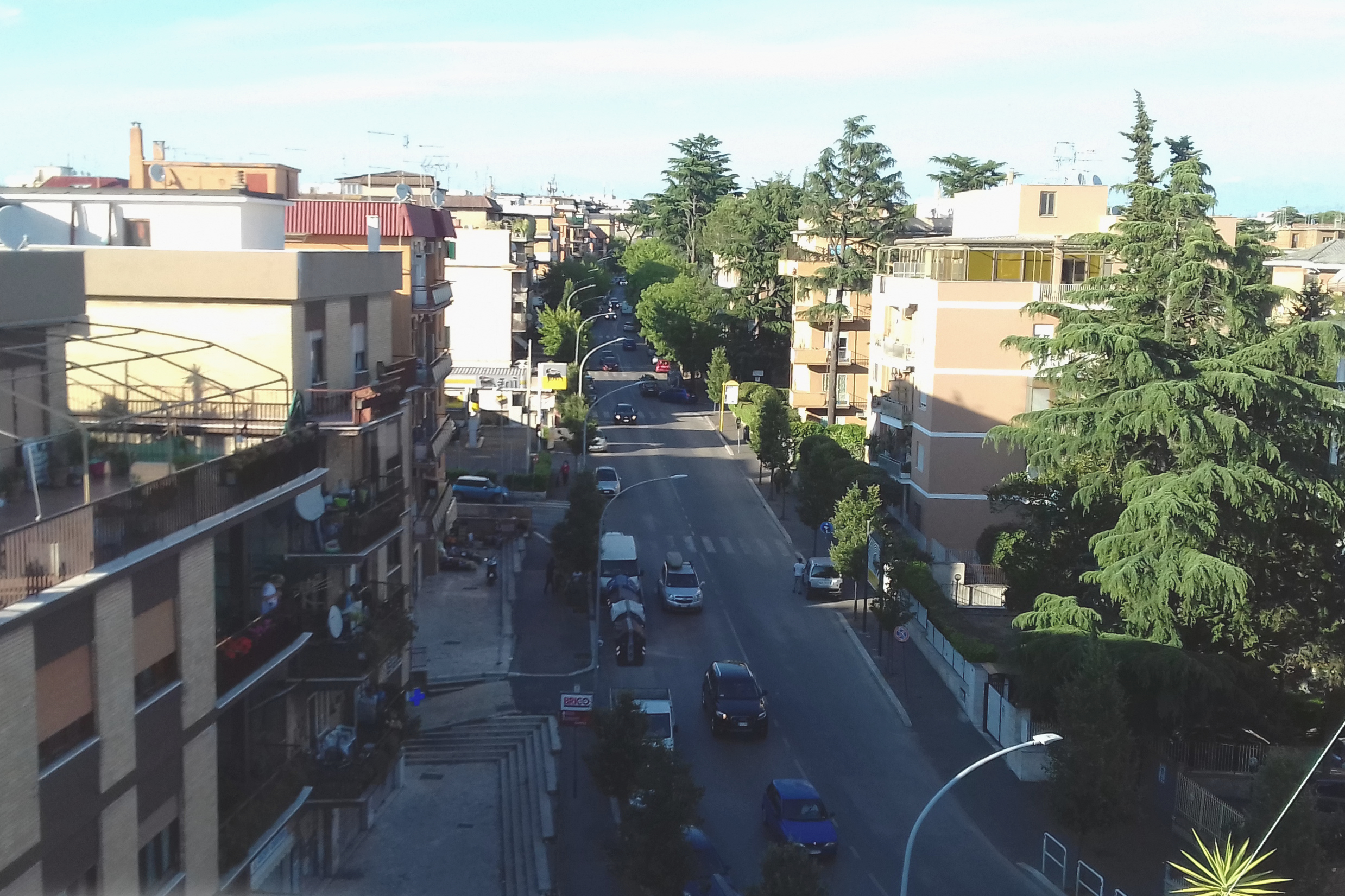
Initial stretch of Via di Torrevecchia, in the northern part of the neighborhood

Over time Primavalle has become more linked to the city center, and is now considered as a semi-peripheral suburb. However, because of the widespread poverty and of the difficult conditions of the population in the past decades, the area is regarded as a petty crime borough. Moreover, during the so-called Anni di Piombo, Primavalle was the location of violent conflicts. On 16 April 1973, the Primavalle fire (arson attack) occurred. During the night, several members of Potere Operaio poured flammable liquid on the door of the home of the secretary of the Primavalle section of the Italian Social Movement - National Right, Mario Mattei. The fire destroyed the apartment, and two of Mattei's sons, Virgilio, aged 22, and Stefano, aged 8, died of burns.

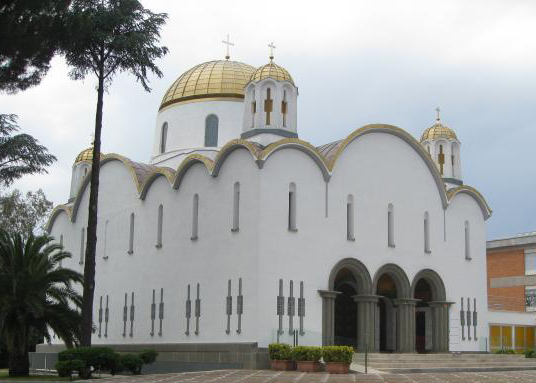
Ukrainian Catholic Basilica of Saint Sophia on Via di Boccea

Between the late 1970s and the first half of the 1980s, several redevelopment interventions took place that determined the current layout of the area.

A distinctive feature of Primavalle was the organization of so-called "reverse strikes". Faced with the inertia of the institutions, residents built facilities necessary for the livability of the borgata. A typical example is the construction, at their own expense and working on public holidays, of several connecting roads with Via della Pineta Sacchetti from the 1950s onward, such as Via del Forte Braschi and Via dei Monti di Primavalle.

== Geography ==
The territory of Primavalle includes the urban zones 19B Primavalle and 19D Santa Maria della Pietà, as well as portions of the urban zones 18B Val Cannuta and 18C Fogaccia.

=== Boundaries ===
To the north, Primavalle borders with Suburbio Della Vittoria (S. XI), whose border is marked by the stretch of Via Trionfale between Via Vincenzo Chiarugi and Via della Pineta Sacchetti.

To the east, the quartiere borders with Quartiere Trionfale (Q. XIV), from which is separated by Via della Pineta Sacchetti. Eastward, Primavalle also borders with Quartiere Aurelio (Q. XIII), whose boundary is marked by Via Domenico Tardini and Largo di Boccea.

Southward, it borders with Suburbio Aurelio (S. IX), from which is separated by Largo di Boccea and Via di Boccea, up to Via di Torrevecchia.

Westward, Primavalle borders with Suburbio Trionfale (S. X), whose boundary is defined by Via di Torrevecchia, Via della Valle dei Fontanili, Via Giuseppe Guicciardi, by the Fosso dei Fontanili up to Via Cesare Lombroso, by Via Cesare Lombroso itself, Via Sebastiano Vinci, Piazza Santa Maria della Pietà and Via Vincenzo Chiarugi.

=== Human geography ===
==== Urban planning ====
Within the territory of the Quartiere Primavalle, in addition to the eponymous Zone 19B, the following urban zones also extend to varying degrees: 19D Santa Maria della Pietà to the north, 18B Val Cannuta to the south, and 18C Fogaccia to the south-west. The neighborhood also includes the urban area of Torrevecchia. The northern part of the quartiere is known as "Monte Mario", after the hill on which it stands and the railway station of the same name; the southern part is known as "Boccea", from the name of the road that borders it.

The urban zone, in addition to covering most of the quartiere, also extends into Suburbio S. XI Della Vittoria (in a small part to the north) and into Suburbio S. X Trionfale to the west.

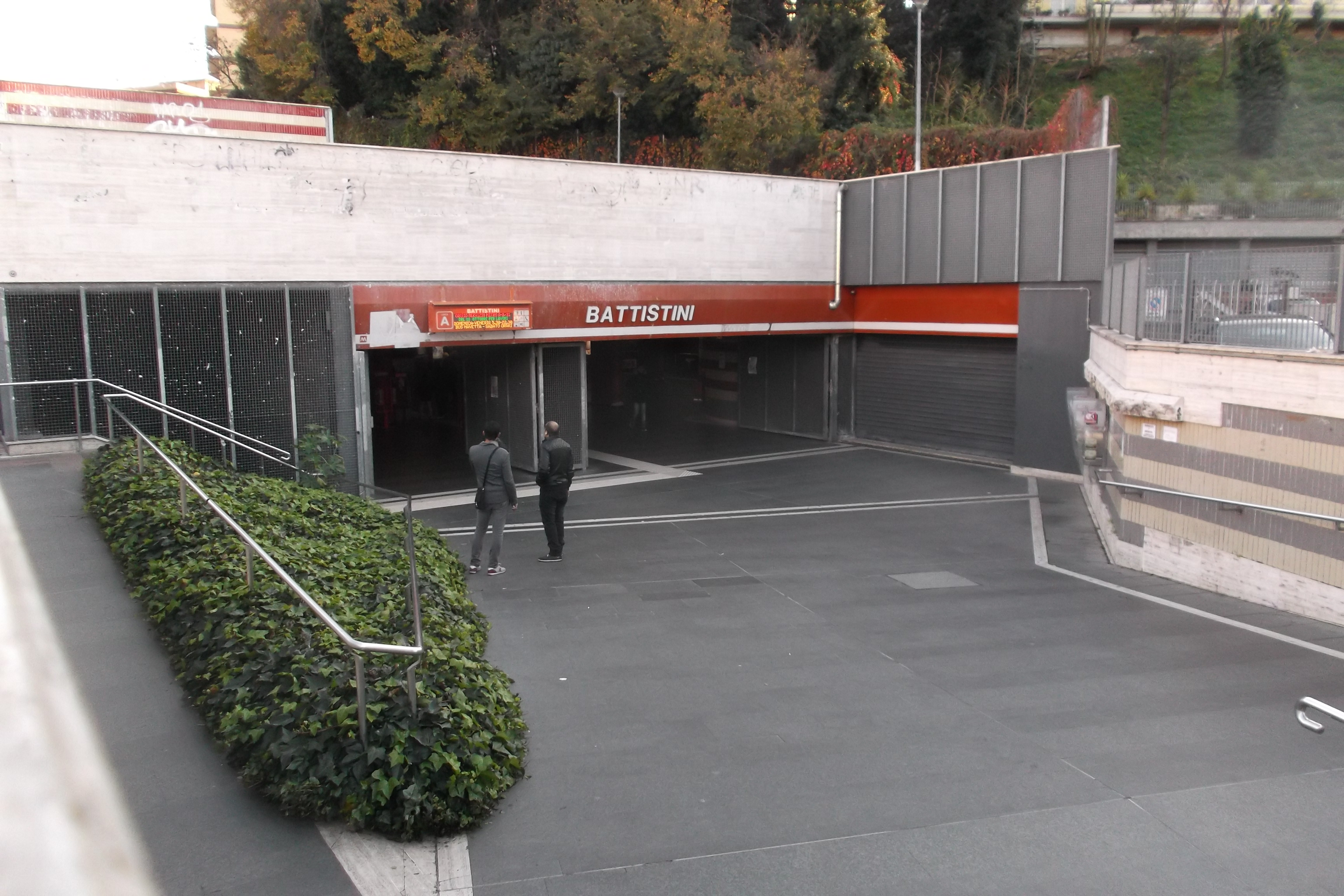
The "Battistini" terminus of Rome Metro Line A

=== Odonymy ===
The majority of the streets and squares of Primavalle is named after religious figures, like popes and cardinals, and after psychiatrists and physicians, revealing the closeness of the borough both to the Vatican City, to the south-east, and to Santa Maria della Pietà, a former mental hospital, to the north. The odonyms of the quartiere can be categorized as follows:

- Actors and operatic singers, e.g. Via Mattia Battistini, Via Gemma Bellincioni, Via Enrico Caruso, Via Edoardo Ferravilla, Via Giulia Grisi, Via Fausta Labia, Via Maria Malibran, Via Claudia Muzio, Via Adelina Patti, Via Titta Ruffo, Via Fanny Tacchinardi;
- Artists related to the St. Peter's Basilica, e.g. Via Pietro Adami, Via Pietro Albertini, Via dei Cristofori, Via Simone Mosca, Via Marcello Provenzale, Via Giambattista Soria;
- Cardinals, e.g. Via Benedetto Aloisi Masella, Via Alessio Ascalesi, Via Pietro Bembo, Via Federico Borromeo, Piazza Alfonso Capecelatro, Via Girolamo Casanate, Via Cardinal Caprara, Via Cardinal Domenico Capranica, Via Cardinal Garampi, Largo Enrico Enríquez, Via Pietro Gasparri, Via Pietro Maffi, Via Prospero Santacroce;
- Educators, e.g. Via Ferrante Aporti, Via Tommaso Pendola, Via Enrico Pestalozzi;
- Popes, e.g. Via Adriano I, Via Alessandro VII, Piazza Clemente XI, Via Eugenio IV, Via Lucio II, Via Pasquale II, Piazza Pio IX, Via San Cleto Papa, Via San Melchiade Papa, Via San Vitaliano, Via Sant'Igino Papa, Via Urbano II;
- Psychiatrists and physicians, e.g. Via Franco Basaglia, Via Ugo Cerletti, Via Vincenzo Chiarugi, Piazza Sante De Sanctis, Via Camillo Golgi, Via Giuseppe Guicciardi, Via Vittorio Marchi, Via Girolamo Mercuriale, Via Enrico Morselli, Via Angelo Mosso, Via Augusto Tamburini, Via Andrea Verga;
- Towns in Liguria, e.g. Via Apricale, Via Beverino, Via Cogoleto, Via Finale Ligure, Largo Millesimo, Via Moneglia, Via Taggia, Via Torriglia, Via Zignago.

== Places of interest ==
=== Churches ===
- San Filippo Neri alla Pineta Sacchetti, on Via Martino V
- Santa Maria della Salute, on Piazza Alfonso Capecelatro
- Santa Maria Assunta e San Giuseppe a Primavalle, on Piazza Clemente XI
- San Lino, on Via della Pineta Sacchetti
- Church of San Cipriano, on Largo Millesimo
- San Giuseppe all'Aurelio, on Via Boccea
- San Luigi Maria Grignion de Montfort, on Viale dei Monfortani
- Church of San Luigi Grignion de Montfort, on Viale dei Monfortani.
- Church of Santa Maria della Presentazione, on Via di Torrevecchia. This is a Parish established on 10 February 1973 by decree of Cardinal Ugo Poletti "Quotidianis curis". Its territory was formed from that of the parishes of Santa Maria Assunta e San Giuseppe a Primavalle and Santa Maria della Salute a Primavalle.
- Church of Santa Sofia, on Via Boccea.
- Rectory church of the parish of Santa Maria della Presentazione, officiated in the Eastern Rite.

=== Green areas ===
- Tenuta di Acquafredda Nature Reserve, extending over part of the southern portion of the Primavalle neighborhood and the territory of Casalotti. Established in 1997, the reserve covers an area of 249 hectares.

==== Parks ====
- Pineto Regional Park, a 40-hectare protected natural area instituted in 1987.

=== Education ===
==== University ====
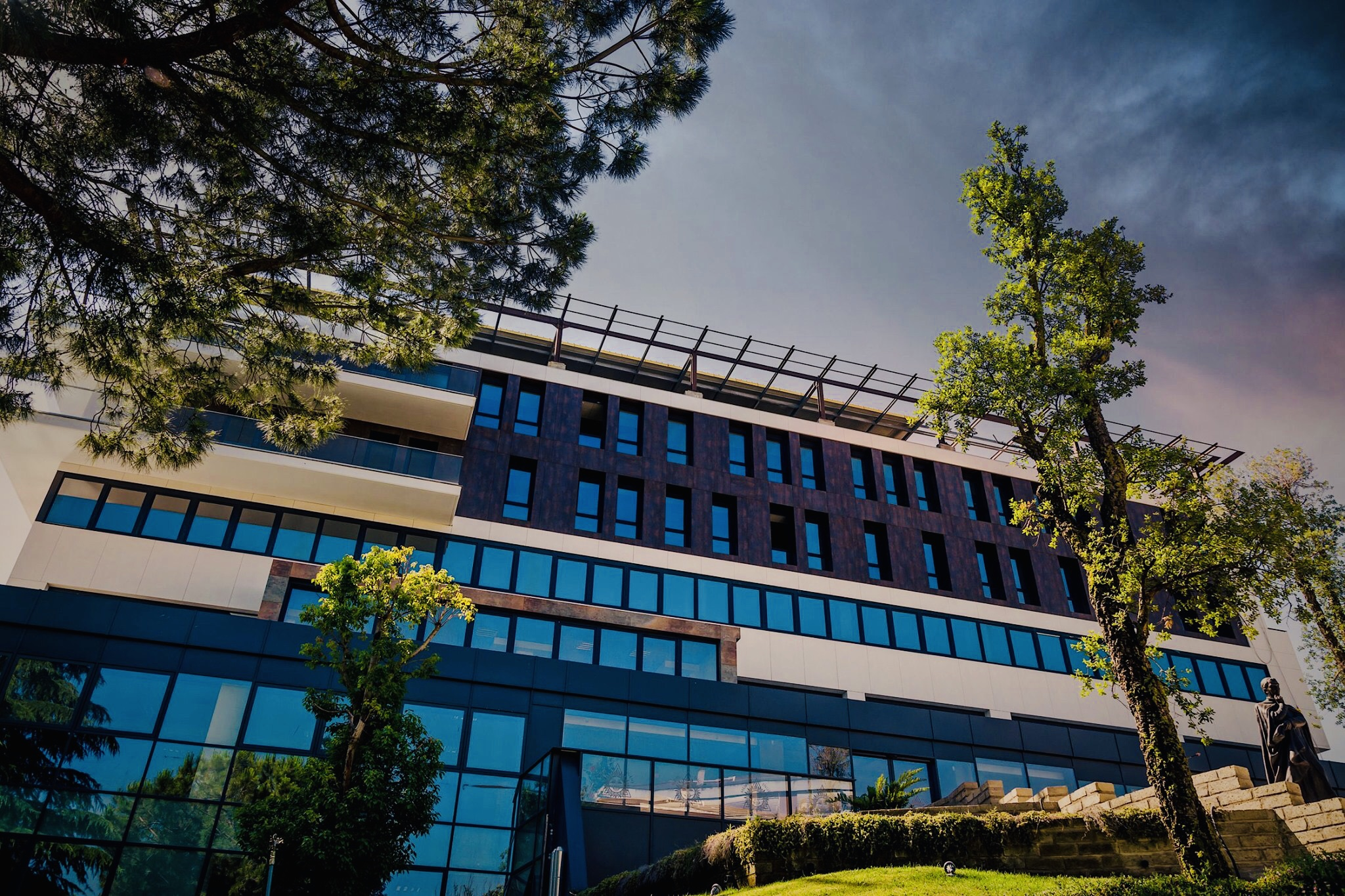
Niccolo Cusano University

At the southern edge of the neighborhood lies Niccolò Cusano University, a private university founded in 2006. Its academic offer is provided through the departments of Economics, Law, Education Sciences, Political Science, Engineering, and Psychology.

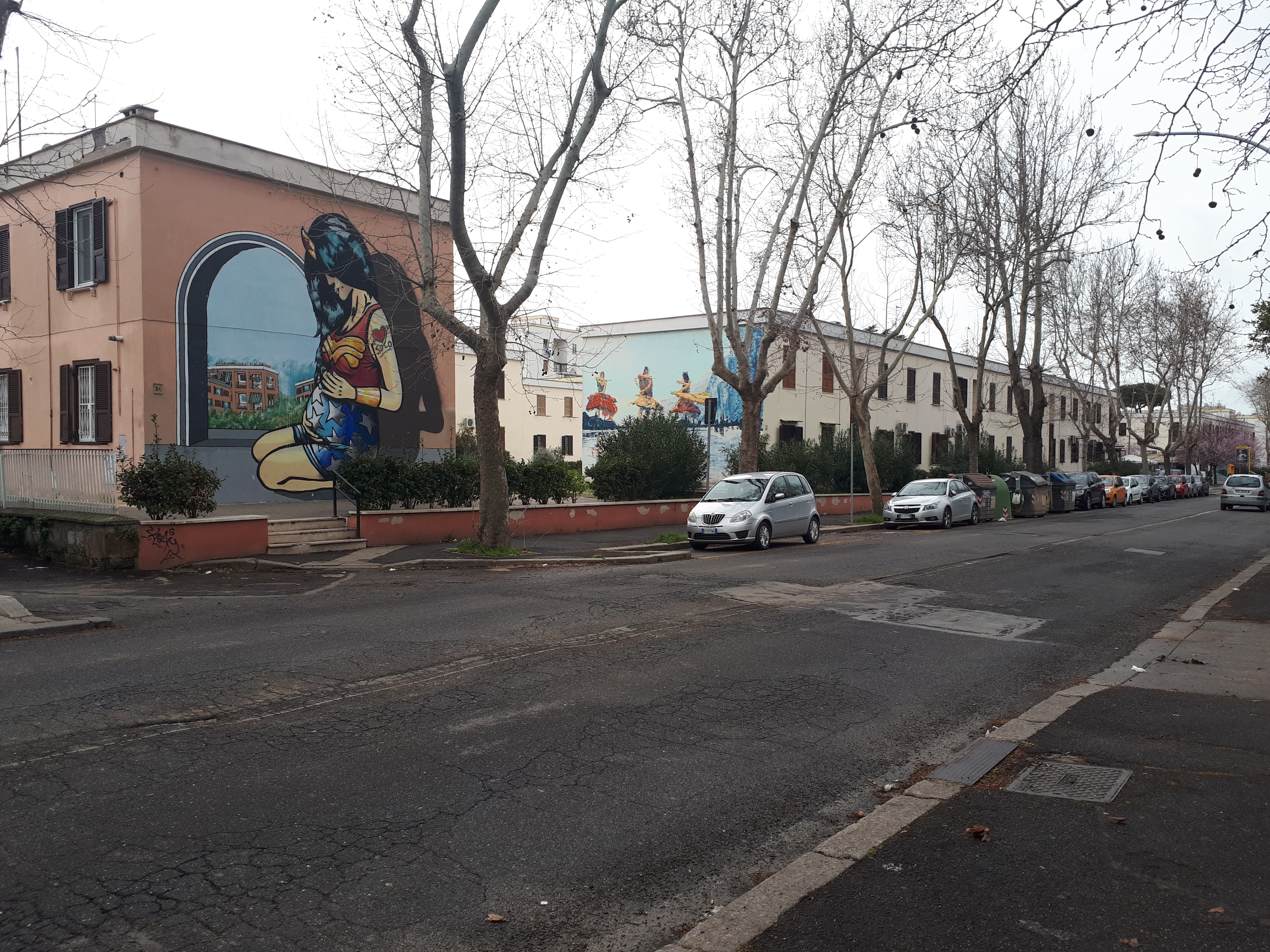
Mural on Via Federico Borromeo

==== Libraries ====
Biblioteca Franco Basaglia is the main public library in Primavalle.

== Sports ==
In Primavalle there are two historic amateur teams: A.S. Primavalle Calcio and A.S.D. Tanas Casalotti. The latter is the result of a merger of three local teams: San Filippo Neri, Casalotti Calcio, and Tanas Primavalle.

== See also ==
- Primavalle Fire

== Bibliography ==
- Lorenzo Sturiale (2004). Partecipería – la periferia come centro di democrazia – contratto di quartiere a Primavalle [Parteciperia – the periphery as a center of democracy – neighborhood contract in Primavalle]. Comune di Roma.
- Giorgio Carpaneto (1997). I quartieri di Roma. Rome: Newton Compton Editori. ISBN 978-88-8183-639-0.
- Mauro Quercioli (1991). "QUARTIERE XXVII. PRIMAVALLE". I Rioni e i Quartieri di Roma. Vol. 8. Rome: Newton Compton Editori.
- Claudio Rendina; Donatella Paradisi (2004). Le strade di Roma. Vol. 1. Rome: Newton Compton Editori. ISBN 88-541-0208-3.
- Claudio Rendina (2006). I quartieri di Roma. Vol. 2. Rome: Newton Compton Editori. ISBN 978-88-541-0595-9.
- Luciano Villani (2012). "5.4 "Sorge Primavalle"". Le borgate del fascismo. Storia urbana, politica e sociale della periferia romana. Milan: Ledizioni. pp. 174–187. ISBN 978-88-6705-014-7.
- Paolo Petaccia; Andrea Greco (2016). Borgate. L'utopia razional-popolare. Roma Capitale. Rome: Officina Edizioni. ISBN 978-88-6049-194-7.
- Gianluca Chiovelli and Alessandro Guarnacci, [ (https://typimediaeditore.it/libro/la-storia-di-primavalle/) La storia di Primavalle. Dalla preistoria ai giorni nostri], Typimedia Editore, 2020, ISBN 9788836260331
- Gianluca Chiovelli, Ennio De Risio and Alessandro Guarnacci, [ (https://www.iacobellieditore.it/catalogo/la-campagna-dei-papi/) La campagna dei Papi. Aurelio e Monte Mario, Via di Boccea, Primavalle, Torrevecchia], Iacobelli Editore, 2023, ISBN 978-88-6252-777-4
