= Municipio XIII =

Coordinates: 41°44′0″N 12°17′06″E

Municipio XIII di Roma
- Municipio of Rome
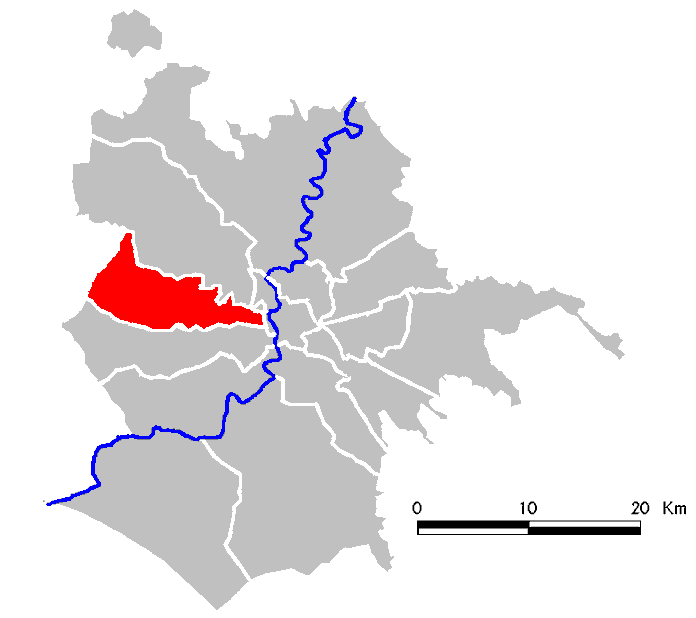
- Location of Municipio XIII of Rome
- Country: Italy
- Region: Lazio
- Comune: Rome
- Established: 2013

Government
  - President: Sabrina Giuseppetti (Democratic Party)

Area
  - Total: 25.84 sq mi (66.93 km^{2})

Population (2010)
  - Total: 137,633
  - Density: 5,190/sq mi (2,004/km^{2})
- Time zone: UTC+1 (CET)
  - Summer (DST): UTC+2 (CEST)

Municipio XIII is an administrative subdivision of the city of Rome. It was first created by Rome's City Council on 19 January 2001 and it has a president who is elected during the mayoral elections.

Originally called Municipio XVIII, since 11 March 2013 its borders were modified and its name changed in Municipio XIII.

== Subdivision ==
Municipio XIII is divided in six urbanisms zones:

Locality	Inhabitants; 31 December 2010
18a Aurelio Sud	27,372
18b Val Cannuta	35,548
18c Fogaccia	30,705
18d Aurelio Nord	19,405
18e Casalotti di Booccea	17,089
18f Boccea	7,309
Not localized	205

== Politics ==
Current allocation of seats in the Municipio XIII's parliamentary body as of the 2013 Rome municipal election:

- Democratic Party (PD) 13
- People of Freedom (PdL) 5
- Left Ecology Freedom 2
- Five Star Movement (M5S) 2
- Others 2

In May 2013 Valentino Mancinelli (PD) was elected president. The current majority is formed by Democratic Party and Left Ecology Freedom.
