= Municipio XIV =

Municipio XIV di Roma
- Municipio of Rome
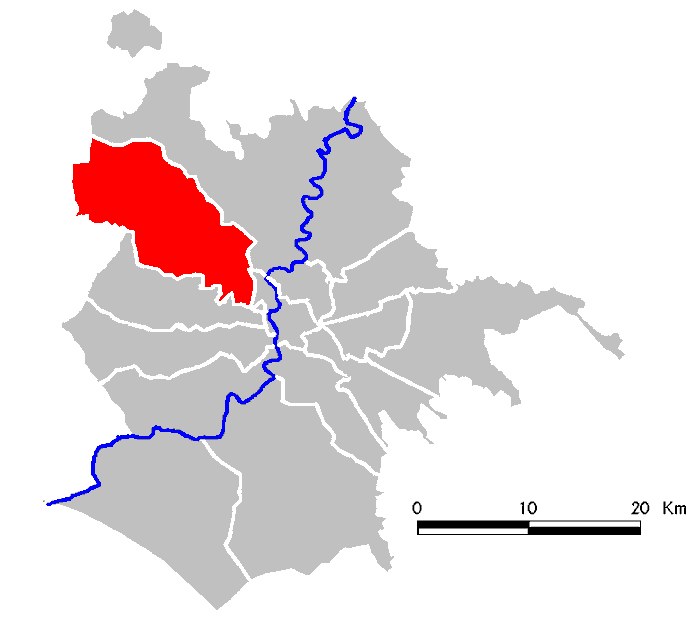
- Location of Municipio XIV of Rome
- Country: Italy
- Region: Lazio
- Comune: Rome
- Established: 2013

Government
  - President: Marco Della Porta (Democratic Party)

Area
  - Total: 51.5 sq mi (133.5 km^{2})

Population (2010)
  - Total: 184,911
  - Density: 3,650/sq mi (1,408/km^{2})
- Time zone: UTC+1 (CET)
  - Summer (DST): UTC+2 (CEST)

Municipio XIV is an administrative subdivision of the city of Rome. It was first created by Rome's City Council on 19 January 2001 and it has a president who is elected during the mayoral elections.

Originally called Municipio XIX, since 11 March 2013 its borders were modified and its name was changed in Municipio XIV.

== Subdivision ==
Municipio XIV is divided into eight localities:

Locality	Inhabitants; 31 December 2010
19a Medaglie d'Oro	41,027
19b Primavalle	59,831
19c Ottavia	16,000
19d Santa Maria della Pietà	21,822
19e Trionfale	17,287
19f Pineto	2,047
19g Castelluccia	22,526
19h Santa Maria di Galeria	3,770
Not localized	601

== Politics ==
Current allocation of seats in the Municipio XIV's parliamentary body as of the 2013 Rome municipal election:

- Democratic Party (PD) 13
- People of Freedom (PdL) 4
- Left Ecology Freedom 2
- Five Star Movement (M5S) 2
- Others 2

In June 2013 Valerio Barletta (PD) was elected president. The current majority is formed by Democratic Party and Left Ecology Freedom.
