= List of diplomatic missions in Rome =

This is a list of the 226 resident embassies in Rome (142 for Italy and 86 for the Holy See). For other diplomatic missions in Italy and the Vatican City, see List of diplomatic missions in Italy and the List of diplomatic missions to the Holy See.

== Embassies in Rome to Italy ==
Country	Address	Municipality	Image	Website
Afghanistan	Via Nomentana, 120	Municipio II		
Albania	Via Asmara, 5	Municipio II		
Algeria	Via Bartolomeo Eustachio, 12	Municipio II		
Angola	Via Druso, 39	Municipio I		
Argentina	Piazza dell`Esquilino, 2	Municipio I		
Armenia	Lungotevere dei Mellini, 17	Municipio I		
Australia	Via Antonio Bosio, 5	Municipio II		
Austria	Via Pergolesi, 3	Municipio II		
Azerbaijan	Via Giovanni Battista de Rossi, 27	Municipio II		
Bahrain	Viale di Villa Massimo, 47	Municipio II		
Bangladesh	Via Dell'Antartide, 5-7	Municipio IX		
Belarus	Via delle Alpi Apuane, 16	Municipio III		
Belgium	Via Giuseppe de Notaris, 6	Municipio II		
Bolivia	Via Civitavecchia, 1	Municipio II		
Bosnia and Herzegovina	Piazzale Clodio, 12/int. 17	Municipio I		
Brazil	Piazza Navona, 14	Municipio I		
Bulgaria	Via Pietro Paolo Rubens, 21	Municipio II		
Burkina Faso	Via Trionfale, 101	Municipio XIV		
Burundi	Via Enrico Accinni, 63 Scala B Int 10	Municipio I		
Cameroon	Viale Regina Margherita, 42	Municipio II		
Canada	Via Zara, 30	Municipio II		
Cape Verde	Via Giosuè Carducci, 4	Municipio I		
Chile	Viale Liegi, 21	Municipio II		
China	Via Bruxelles, 56	Municipio II		
Colombia	Vía Giuseppe Pisanelli, 4	Municipio II		
Congo	Via Ombrone, 8/10	Municipio II		
DR Congo	Via del Quirinale, 26	Municipio I		
Costa Rica	Viale Parioli, 41	Municipio II		
Croatia	Via Virginio Orsini, 27	Municipio I		
Cuba	Via Licinia, 7	Municipio I		
Cyprus	Via Ludovisi, 35	Municipio II		
Czech Republic	Via dei Gracchi, 322	Municipio I		
Denmark	Piazza Rio de Janeiro, 3	Municipio II		
Dominican Republic	Via Ludovisi, 16	Municipio I		
Ecuador	Via Nomentana 257, int. 5	Municipio II		
Egypt	Villa Savoia - Via Salaria, 267	Municipio II		
El Salvador	Via Gualtiero Castellini, 13	Municipio II		
Equatorial Guinea	Via Bruxelles, 59/A	Municipio II		
Eritrea	Via Savoia, 80	Municipio II		
Estonia	Via Clitunno, 34-36	Municipio II		
Ethiopia	Via Andrea Vesalio, 16	Municipio II		
Finland	Via Lisbona, 3	Municipio II		
France	Piazza Farnese, 67	Municipio I		
Gabon	Lungotevere Michelangelo, 9	Municipio I		
Georgia	Via del Plebiscito, 102	Municipio I		
Germany	Via San Martino della Battaglia, 4	Municipio I		
Ghana	Via Ostriana, 4	Municipio II		
Greece	Viale Gioacchino Rossini, 4	Municipio II		
Guatemala	Vía Arenula, 83	Municipio I		
Guinea	Via Adelaide Ristori, 9b/13	Municipio II		
Haiti	Via di Villa Patrizi, 7-7A	Municipio II		
Holy See	Via Po, 27a/29	Municipio II		
Honduras	Via Emanuele Gianturco, 5	Municipio II		
Hungary	Via dei Villini, 12	Municipio II		
Iceland	Corso Vittorio Emanuele II, 154	Municipio I		
India	Via XX Settembre, 5	Municipio I		
Indonesia	Via Campania, 55	Municipio I		
Iran	Via Nomentana, 361	Municipio II		
Iraq	Via della Camilluccia, 355	Municipio XV		
Ireland	Villa Spada - Via Giacomo Medici, 1	Municipio I		
Israel	Via Michele Mercati, 14	Municipio II		
Ivory Coast	Via Guglielmo Saliceto, 6-8-10	Municipio II		
Japan	Via Quintino Sella, 60	Municipio I		
Jordan	Via Giuseppe Marchi, 1/b	Municipio II		
Kazakhstan	Via Cassia, 471	Municipio XV		
Kenya	Viale Luca Gaurico, 205	Municipio IX		
Kosovo	Via Tolmino, 12	Municipio II		
Kuwait	Via Archimede, 124/126	Municipio II		
Kyrgyzstan	Via Clitunno, 2	Municipio II		
Latvia	Via Giovanni Battista Martini, 13	Municipio II		
Lebanon	Via Giacomo Carissimi, 38	Municipio II		
Lesotho	Via Serchio, 8	Municipio II		
Liberia	Piazza Medaglie d'Oro, 7	Municipio XIV		
Libya	Via Nomentana, 365	Municipio II		
Lithuania	Via Vittoria Colonna, 1	Municipio I		
Luxembourg	Via Santa Croce in Gerusalemme, 90	Municipio I		
Madagascar	Via Riccardo Zandonai, 84/A	Municipio XV		
Malaysia	Via Nomentana, 297	Municipio II		
Mali	Via delle Cave Fiscali, 21	Municipio III		
Malta	Lungotevere Marzio, 12	Municipio I		
Mauritania	Via Antonio Bertoloni, 29	Municipio II		
Mexico	Via Lazzaro Spallanzani, 16	Municipio II		
Moldova	Via Francesco Cherubini, 27	Municipio XV		
Monaco	Via Bertoloni, 36	Municipio II		
Mongolia	Via Vincenzo Bellini, 4	Municipio II		
Montenegro	Via Giovanni Paisiello, 27	Municipio II		
Morocco	Via Brenta, 12/16	Municipio II		
Mozambique	Via Filippo Corridoni, 14	Municipio I		
Myanmar	Viale Cortina d’ Amprezzo, 50	Municipio XV		
Netherlands	Via Michele Mercati, 8	Municipio II		
New Zealand	Via Clitunno, 44	Municipio II		
Niger	Via Leon Pancaldo, 14/26	Municipio VIII		
Nigeria	Via Orazio, 14/18	Municipio I		
North Korea	Viale dell'Esperanto, 26	Municipio IX		
North Macedonia	Viale Bruxelles, 73-75	Municipio II		
Norway	Via delle Terme Deciane, 7	Municipio I		
Oman	Via della Camilluccia, 625	Municipio XV		
Pakistan	Via della Camilluccia, 682	Municipio XV		
Panama	Largo di Torre Argentina, 11	Municipio I		
Paraguay	Via Panama, 74	Municipio II		
Peru	Via Francesco Siacci, 2b	Municipio II		
Philippines	Via Aurelia, 290 / A	Municipio XIII		
Poland	Via Pietro Paolo Rubens, 20	Municipio I		
Portugal	Via Guido d’Arezzo, 5	Municipio II		
Qatar	Via Goito, 50-52	Municipio I		
Romania	Via Nicolo Tartaglia, 36	Municipio II		
Russia	Via Gaeta, 5	Municipio I		
San Marino	Via Eleonora Duse, 35	Municipio II		
Saudi Arabia	Via Giovanni Battista Pergolesi, 9	Municipio II		
Senegal	Via Antonio Stoppani, 7/I	Municipio II		
Serbia	Via dei Monti Parioli, 20	Municipio II		
Slovakia	Via dei Colli della Farnesina, 144 VI/A	Municipio XV		
Slovenia	Via Salaria, 222	Municipio II		
Somalia	Via dei Gracchi, 305	Municipio I		
South Africa	Via Tanaro, 14	Municipio II		
South Korea	Via Piemonte, 54	Municipio I		
South Sudan	Via Valle della Storta, 182	Municipio XV		
Sovereign Military Order of Malta	Piazza dei Cavalieri di Malta, 3	Municipio I		
Spain	Piazza Navona, 106/109	Municipio I		
Sri Lanka	Via Adige, 2	Municipio II		
Sudan	Via Panama, 48	Municipio II		
Sweden	Piazza Rio de Janeiro, 3	Municipio II		
Switzerland	Via Barnaba Oriani, 61	Municipio II		
Syria	Piazza d'Aracoeli, 1	Municipio I		
Tajikistan	Vía Giuseppe Pisanelli, 4	Municipio II		
Tanzania	Viale Cortina D'Ampezzo, 185	Municipio XV		
Thailand	Via Nomentana, 132	Municipio II		
Tunisia	Via Asmara, 7	Municipio II		
Turkey	Via Palestro, 28	Municipio I		
Turkmenistan	Via Dei Tre Orologi, 6	Municipio II		
Uganda	Via Salita del Poggio Laurentino, 7	Municipio XIV		
Ukraine	Via Guido d'Arezzo, 9	Municipio II		
United Arab Emirates	Piazza della Croce Rossa, 3	Municipio II		
United Kingdom	Via XX Settembre 80/a	Municipio I		
United States	Palazzo Margherita - Via Veneto, 121	Municipio I		
Uruguay	Via Giacomo Puccini, 10	Municipio II		
Uzbekistan	Via Pompeo Magno, 1	Municipio I		
Venezuela	Via Nicolò Tartaglia, 11	Municipio I		
Vietnam	Via di Bravetta, 156	Municipio XII		
Yemen	Via Antonio Bosio, 10	Municipio II		
Zambia	Via Ennio Quirino Visconti, 8	Municipio I		
Zimbabwe	Via Crescenzio, 9	Municipio I		

== Missions and Consulates in Rome to Italy ==
Country	Mission type	Address	Municipality	Image	Website
Palestine	Mission	Viale Guido Baccelli, 10	Municipio I		
Taiwan (Taiwan)	Representative Office	Viale Liegi, 17	Municipio II		

== Embassies to the Holy See based in Rome ==
Country	Address	Municipality	Image	Website
Albania	Via della Conciliazione, 10	Municipio I		
Angola	Palazzo Odescalchi-Piazza SS Apostoli, 81-1	Municipio I		
Argentina	Piazza della Città Leonina, 1 - 3P	Municipio I		
Armenia	Via dei Corridori, 64	Municipio I		
Australia	Corso Vittorio Emanuele II, 349	Municipio I		
Austria	Via Reno, 9	Municipio II		
Azerbaijan	Via Della Conciliazione, 10	Municipio I		
Belarus	Via Monte Santo, 10 A - 2nd floor	Municipio XV		
Belgium	Via Giuseppe de Notaris, 6	Municipio II		
Bolivia	Via Di Porta Angelica, 15	Municipio I		
Bosnia and Herzegovina	Piazzale Clodio, 12	Municipio I		
Brazil	Via della Conciliazione, 22	Municipio I		
Bulgaria	Via Ferdinando Galiani, 36	Municipio XV		
Burkina Faso	Via di Porta Angelica, 63	Municipio I		
Burundi	Via Porta Angelica, 31	Municipio I		
Cameroon	Piazza Digione, 2	Municipio II		
Canada	Palazzo Pio, Via della Conciliazione 4-D	Municipio I		
Chile	Piazza Città Leonina, 9	Municipio I		
Colombia	Via Cola Di Rienzo, 285	Municipio I		
Congo	Via Aurelia, 172	Municipio XIII		
DR Congo	Via della Stazione di San Pietro, 6	Municipio XIII		
Costa Rica	Via Alberico II, 33	Municipio I		
Croatia	Via della Conciliazione, 44	Municipio I		
Cuba	Via Aurelia, 137	Municipio XIII		
Cyprus	Piazza Farnese, 44	Municipio I		
Czech Republic	Via Crescenzio, 91	Municipio I		
Dominican Republic	Via Rusticucci, 14	Municipio I		
Ecuador	Via di Porta Angelica, 63	Municipio I		
Egypt	Piazza della Città Leonina, 9	Municipio I		
El Salvador	Via Alberico II, 35	Municipio I		
Equatorial Guinea	Via Aurelia, 172	Municipio XIII		
France	Via Piave, 23	Municipio I		
Gabon	Via Ovidio, 7a	Municipio I		
Georgia	Via Toscana, 48	Municipio I		
Germany	Via di Villa Sacchetti, 4-6	Municipio II		
Ghana	Via Fasana, 36	Municipio I		
Greece	Via Giuseppe Mercalli, 6	Municipio II		
Guatemala	Corso del Rinascimento, 49	Municipio I		
Haiti	Via di Villa Patrizi, 5/B	Municipio II		
Honduras	Via dei Gracchi, 81	Municipio I		
Hungary	Piazza Girolamo Fabrizio, 2	Municipio II		
Indonesia	Via Marocco, 10	Municipio IX		
Iran	Via Bruxelles, 57	Municipio II		
Iraq	Via della Camilluccia, 355	Municipio XV		
Ireland	Via dei Corridori, 48	Municipio I		
Israel	Via Michele Mercati, 12	Municipio II		
Italy	Viale delle Belle Arti, 2	Municipio II		
Ivory Coast	Via Brenta, 13	Municipio II		
Japan	Via della Conciliazione, 15	Municipio I		
Kazakhstan	Via dei Corridori, 48	Municipio I		
Kenya				
Lebanon	Via di Porta Angelica, 15	Municipio I		
Libya	Via Orazio, 31	Municipio I		
Lithuania	Via Giulia, 66	Municipio I		
Malaysia	Via della Conciliazione, 4/D	Municipio I		
Mexico	Via Ezio, 49	Municipio I		
Monaco	Largo Spinelli, 5	Municipio II		
Montenegro	Via dei Corridori, 48	Municipio I		
Morocco	Via Venti Settembre, 98/G	Municipio I		
Mozambique	Via della Conciliazione, 1	Municipio I		
Netherlands	Via Michele Mercati, 6	Municipio II		
Nigeria		Municipio I		
North Macedonia	Via di Porta Cavalleggeri, 143	Municipio XIII		
Palestine	Via Porta Angelica, 63	Municipio I		
Panama	Largo di Torre Argentina, 11	Municipio I		
Paraguay	Via Della Conciliazione, 10	Municipio I		
Peru	Via Di Porta Angelica, 63	Municipio I		
Philippines	Via Paolo VI, 29	Municipio I		
Poland	Via dei Delfini, 16	Municipio I		
Portugal	Villa Lusa - Via S.Valentino, 9	Municipio II		
Taiwan (Taiwan)	Via della Conciliazione, 4/d	Municipio I		
Romania	Via Panama, 92	Municipio II		
Russia	Via della Conciliazione, 10	Municipio I		
San Marino	Via Fogliano, 6	Municipio II		
Senegal	Via Crescenzio, 97	Municipio I		
Serbia	Via dei Monti Parioli, 20	Municipio II		
Slovakia	Via dei Colli della Farnesina, 144	Municipio XV		
Slovenia	Via della Conciliazione, 10	Municipio I		
South Korea	Via della Mendola, 109	Municipio XV		
Sovereign Military Order of Malta	Orsini Palace - Via di Monte Savello, 30	Municipio I		
Spain	Palazzo di Spagna - Piazza di Spagna, 57	Municipio I		
Switzerland	Via Crescenzio, 97	Municipio I		
Timor-Leste	Via Giosuè Carducci, 2	Municipio I		
Turkey	Via Serchio, 9 - 11	Municipio II		
Ukraine	Via dei Corridori, 48	Municipio I		
United Kingdom	Via dei Corridori, 48	Municipio I		
United States	Via Sallustiana, 49	Municipio I		
Uruguay	Via dei Corridori, 48	Municipio I		
Venezuela	Via Antonio Gramsci, 14	Municipio I		

== See also ==
- Foreign relations of Italy
- Foreign relations of the Holy See
- List of diplomatic missions in Italy
- List of diplomatic missions to the Holy See
