= Fleming (Rome) =

Neighborhood in Rome, Italy

Coordinates: 41°55′55.57″N 12°29′12.55″E

Fleming is a neighbourhood of Rome, Italy. Administratively it was part of Municipio XV of Rome.

The district is situated just east of Corso Francia, on the other side of the road from Vigna Clara railway station.

Elegant and quiet, it is an upscale residential area of Rome.

== Origin of the name ==
The name derives from the name of Via Fleming, the road that, starting from Corso di Francia, joins the Flaminia Vecchia, via Via Bevagna.

It sits on top of a hill overlooking the meanders of the Tiber, similar to the Monti Parioli hills on the other side of the river. For this reason Romans often refer to the area as Collina Fleming (Fleming hill).
