= Embassy of Colombia, Holy See =

- Location: Prati
- Address: Via Cola di Rienzo, 285; 00192 Rome, Italy
- Coordinates: 41°54′24.54″N 12°27′35.20″E
- Ambassador: Jorge Mario Eastman

The Embassy of Colombia to the Holy See is the diplomatic mission of the Republic of Colombia to the Holy See; it is headed by the Ambassador of Colombia to the Holy See. The current ambassador is Jorge Mario Eastman. It is located in the Prati neighbourhood of the Municipio XVII of Rome, just outside Vatican City, precisely at Via Cola di Rienzo, 285 at the intersection of Via Silla, and it is serviced by the Ottaviano–San Pietro–Musei Vaticani metro station and the Risorgimento tram stop.

== Background ==
The Vatican established diplomatic relations with Colombia on 26 November 1835. The embassy is accredited to the Sovereign Military Order of Malta. The embassy is charged with representing the interests of the President and Government of Colombia, improving diplomatic relations between Colombia and the accredited countries, promoting and improving the image and standing of Colombia in the accredited nations, promoting the Culture of Colombia, encouraging and facilitating tourism to and from Colombia, and ensuring the safety of Colombians abroad.

Unlike all other embassies, the Embassy of Colombia near the Holy See is not located within the accredited entity, this is because of the size limitations of Vatican City, all embassies accredited to the Holy See are located in Rome and are accredited to the Holy See and not to the Vatican City State proper.

In 2021, Ambassador Jorge Mario Eastman presented a mosaic representing Our Lady of the Rosary of Chiquinquirá, which was commissioned by the embassy, to the Vatican, to be displayed in the Vatican gardens.
