= Municipio XV =

Administrative area of Rome in Lazio, Italy

Municipio XV di Roma
- Municipio of Rome
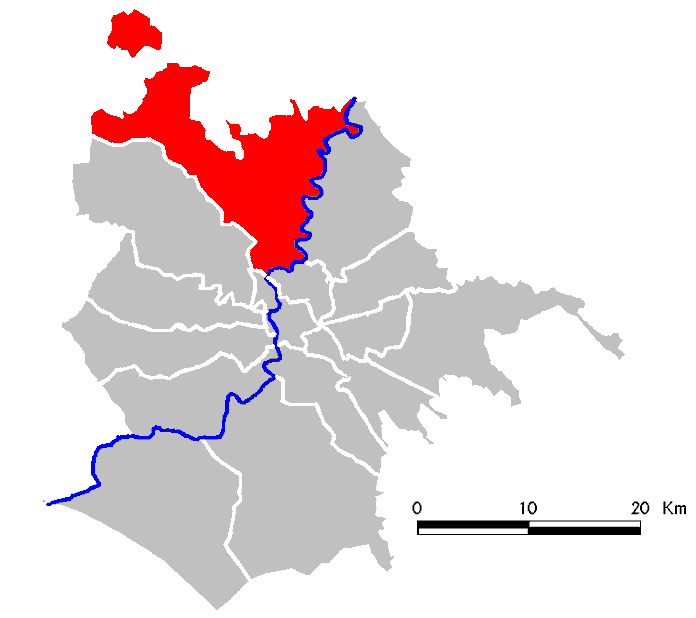
- Location of Municipio XV of Rome
- Country: Italy
- Region: Lazio
- Comune: Rome
- Established: 2013

Government
  - President: Daniele Torquati (Democratic Party)

Population (2016)
  - Total: 159,984
- Time zone: UTC+1 (CET)
  - Summer (DST): UTC+2 (CEST)

Municipio XV (or Municipality 15) is one of the 15 administrative subdivisions of the city of Rome in Italy.

== Localities ==
- Fleming neighbourhood
