= List of diplomatic missions in Italy =

At present, the capital city of Rome hosts 142 embassies. Several countries have ambassadors accredited to Italy, with most being resident in Brussels, London, or Paris. This listing excludes honorary consulates, trade missions, and embassies to the Holy See.

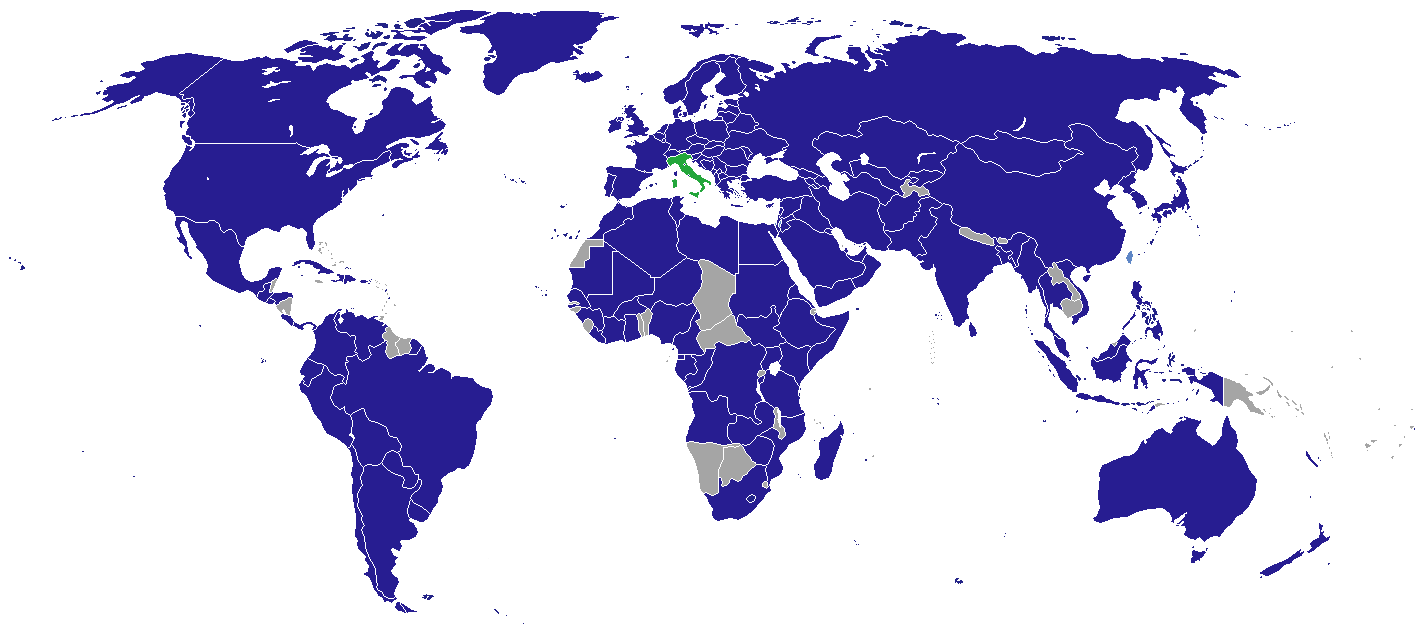
Map of diplomatic missions in Italy

== Diplomatic Missions in Rome ==
=== Embassies ===
1. Afghanistan
2. Albania
3. Algeria
4. Angola
5. Argentina
6. Armenia
7. Australia
8. Austria
9. Azerbaijan
10. Bahrain
11. Bangladesh
12. Belarus
13. Belgium
14. Bolivia
15. Bosnia and Herzegovina
16. Brazil
17. Bulgaria
18. Burkina Faso
19. Burundi
20. Cameroon
21. Canada
22. Cape Verde
23. Chile
24. China
25. Colombia
26. Congo-Brazzaville
27. Congo-Kinshasa
28. Costa Rica
29. Croatia
30. Cuba
31. Cyprus
32. Czech Republic
33. Denmark
34. Dominican Republic
35. Ecuador
36. Egypt
37. El Salvador
38. Equatorial Guinea
39. Eritrea
40. Estonia
41. Ethiopia
42. Finland
43. France
44. Gabon
45. Georgia
46. Germany
47. Ghana
48. Greece
49. Guatemala
50. Guinea
51. Haiti
52. Holy See
53. Honduras
54. Hungary
55. Iceland
56. India
57. Indonesia
58. Iran
59. Iraq
60. Ireland
61. Israel
62. Ivory Coast
63. Japan
64. Jordan
65. Kazakhstan
66. Kenya
67. Kosovo
68. Kuwait
69. Kyrgyzstan
70. Latvia
71. Lebanon
72. Lesotho
73. Liberia
74. Libya
75. Lithuania
76. Luxembourg
77. Madagascar
78. Malaysia
79. Mali
80. Malta
81. Mauritania
82. Mexico
83. Moldova
84. Monaco
85. Mongolia
86. Montenegro
87. Morocco
88. Mozambique
89. Myanmar
90. Netherlands
91. New Zealand
92. Niger
93. Nigeria
94. North Korea
95. North Macedonia
96. Norway
97. Oman
98. Pakistan
99. Panama
100. Paraguay
101. Peru
102. Philippines
103. Poland
104. Portugal
105. Qatar
106. Romania
107. Russia
108. San Marino
109. Saudi Arabia
110. Senegal
111. Serbia
112. Slovakia
113. Slovenia
114. Somalia
115. South Africa
116. South Korea
117. South Sudan
118. SMOM
119. Spain
120. Sri Lanka
121. Sudan
122. Sweden
123. Switzerland
124. Syria (details)
125. Tajikistan
126. Tanzania
127. Thailand
128. Tunisia
129. Turkey
130. Turkmenistan
131. Uganda
132. Ukraine
133. United Arab Emirates
134. United Kingdom
135. United States
136. Uruguay
137. Uzbekistan
138. Venezuela
139. Vietnam
140. Yemen
141. Zambia
142. Zimbabwe

=== Permanent missions to the Food and Agriculture Organization ===
1. Brazil
2. European Union (Delegation)
3. France
4. Germany
5. Italy
6. Mexico
7. Netherlands
8. Norway
9. Poland
10. Switzerland
11. United States (Note: see United States Mission to the UN Agencies in Rome.)

=== Other delegations or representative offices ===
1. Abkhazia (Representative Office)
2. Catalonia (Delegation)
3. Republic of China (Taiwan) (Taipei Representative Office)
4. Northern Cyprus (Representative Office)
5. Palestine (Mission)
6. South Ossetia (Representative Office) (Note: The government of Italy does not recognize either "the self-proclaimed representative office" or its diplomatic status.)

=== Gallery ===
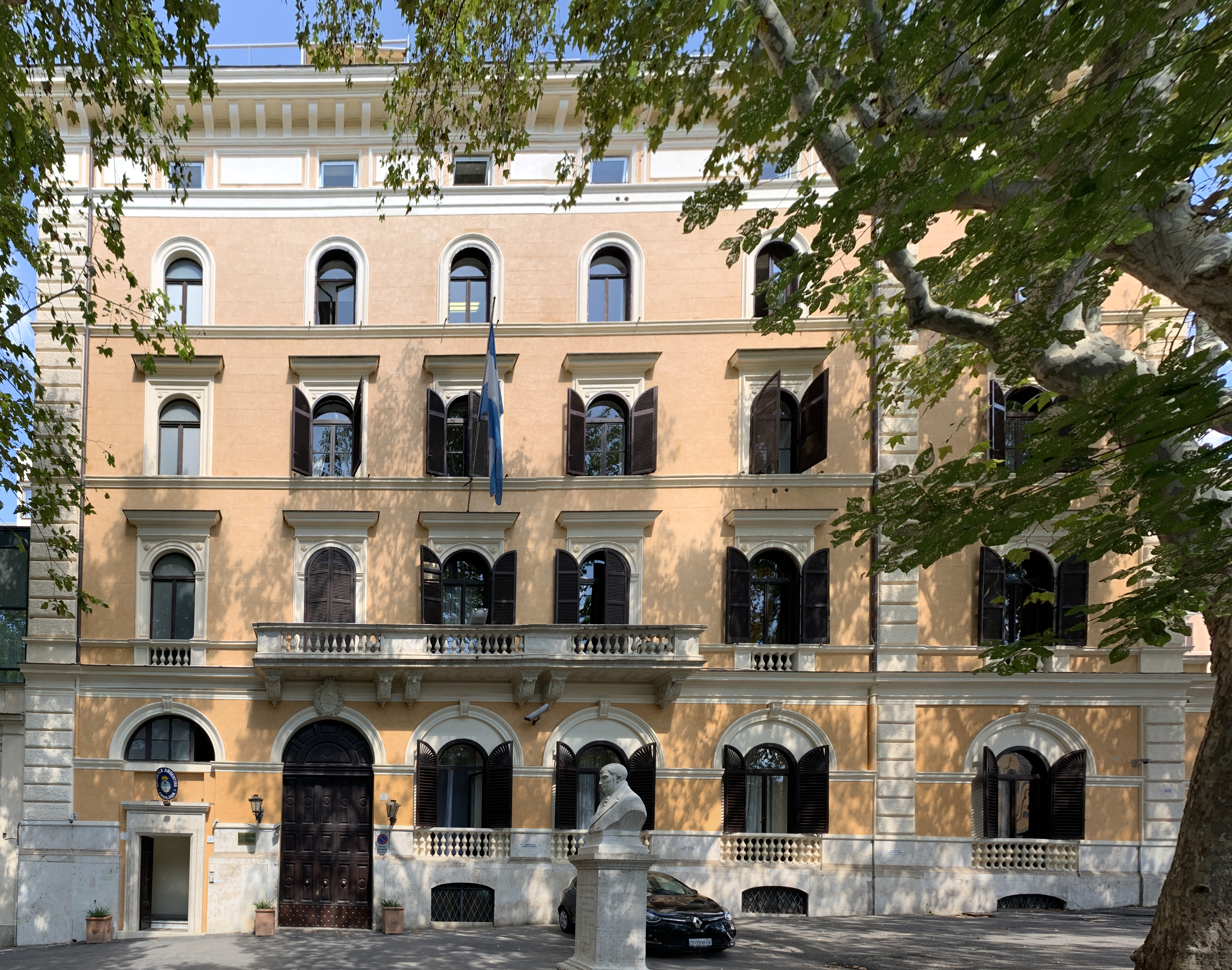
Embassy of Argentina

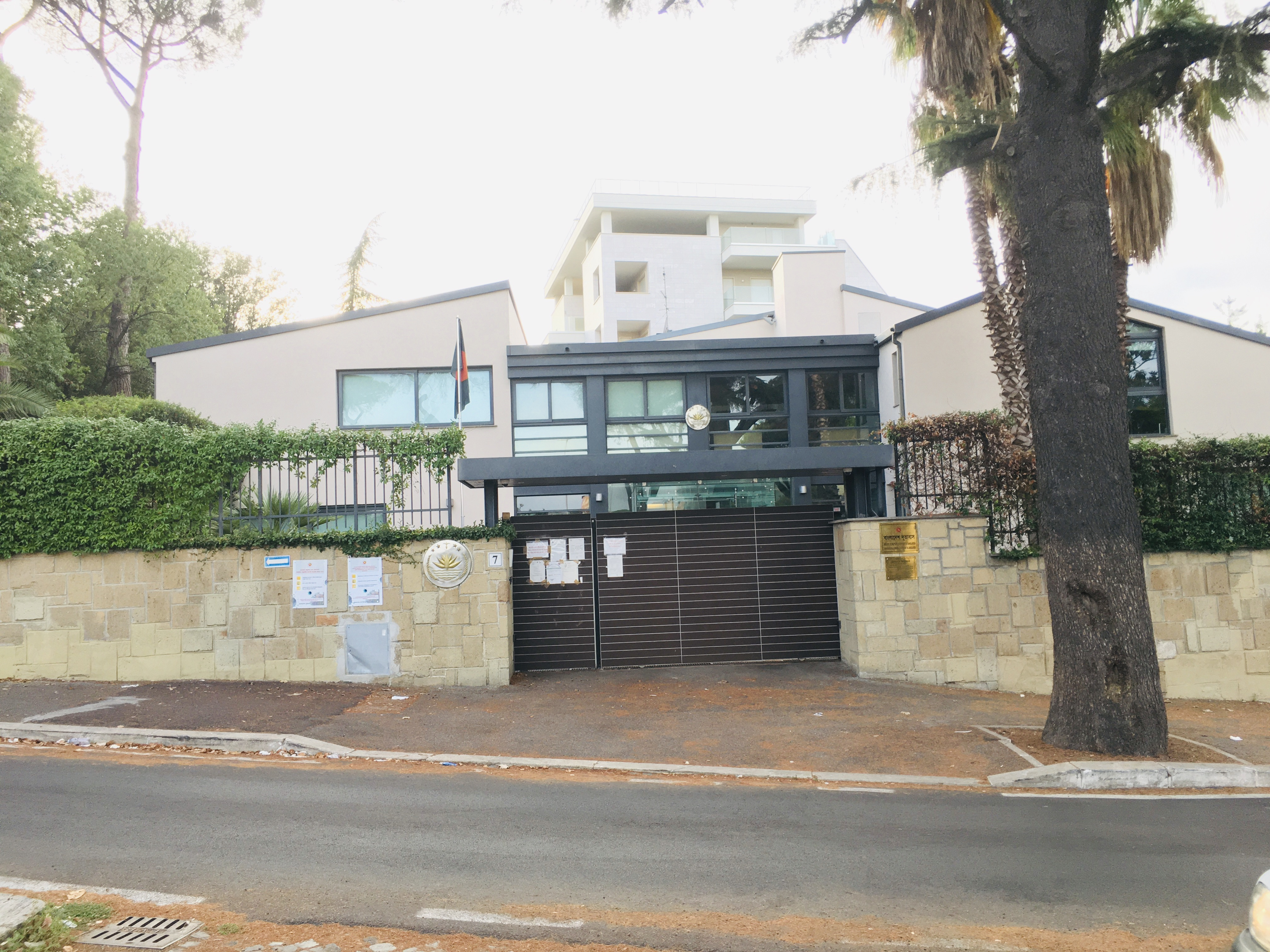
Embassy of Bangladesh

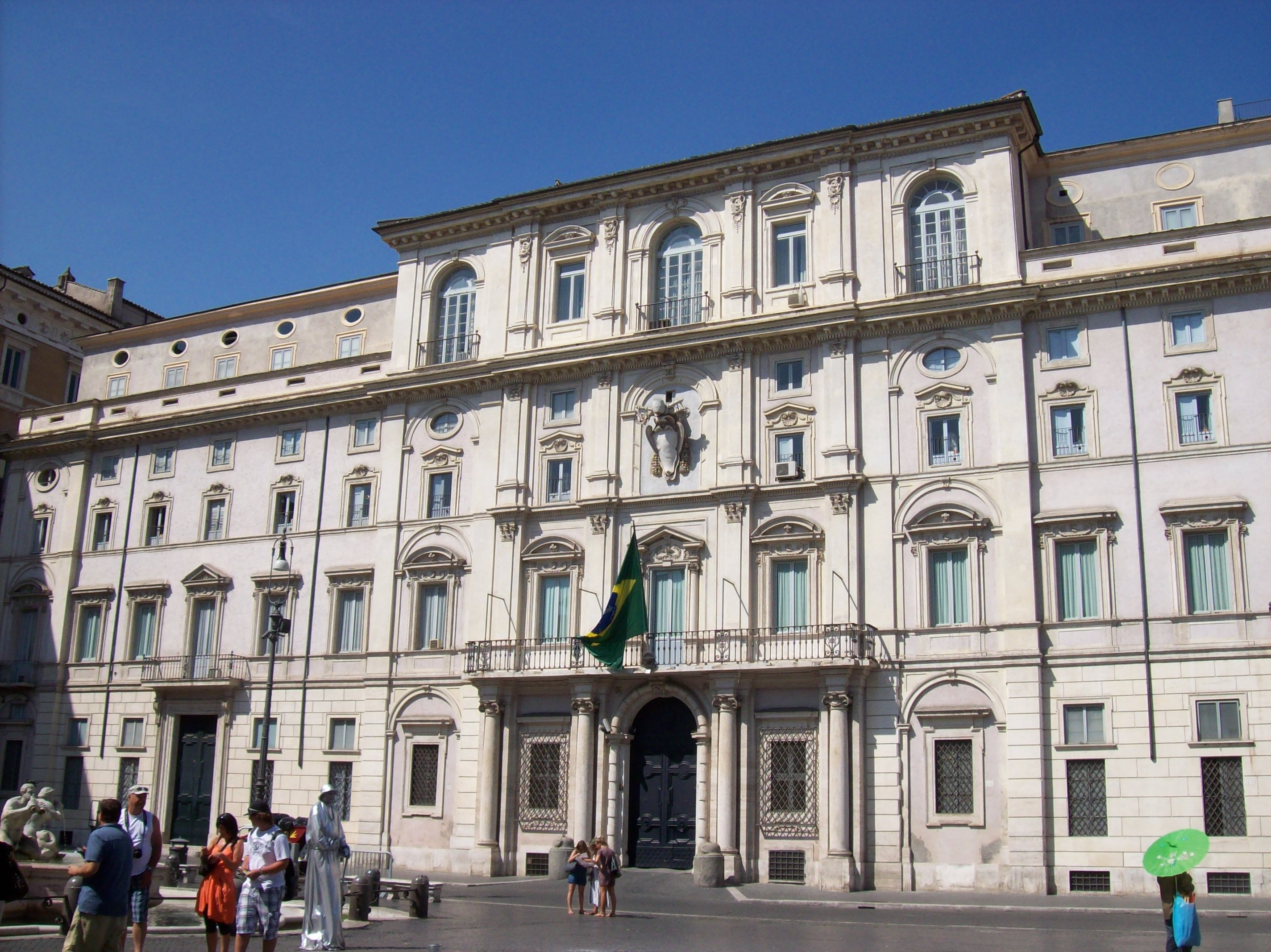
Embassy of Brazil

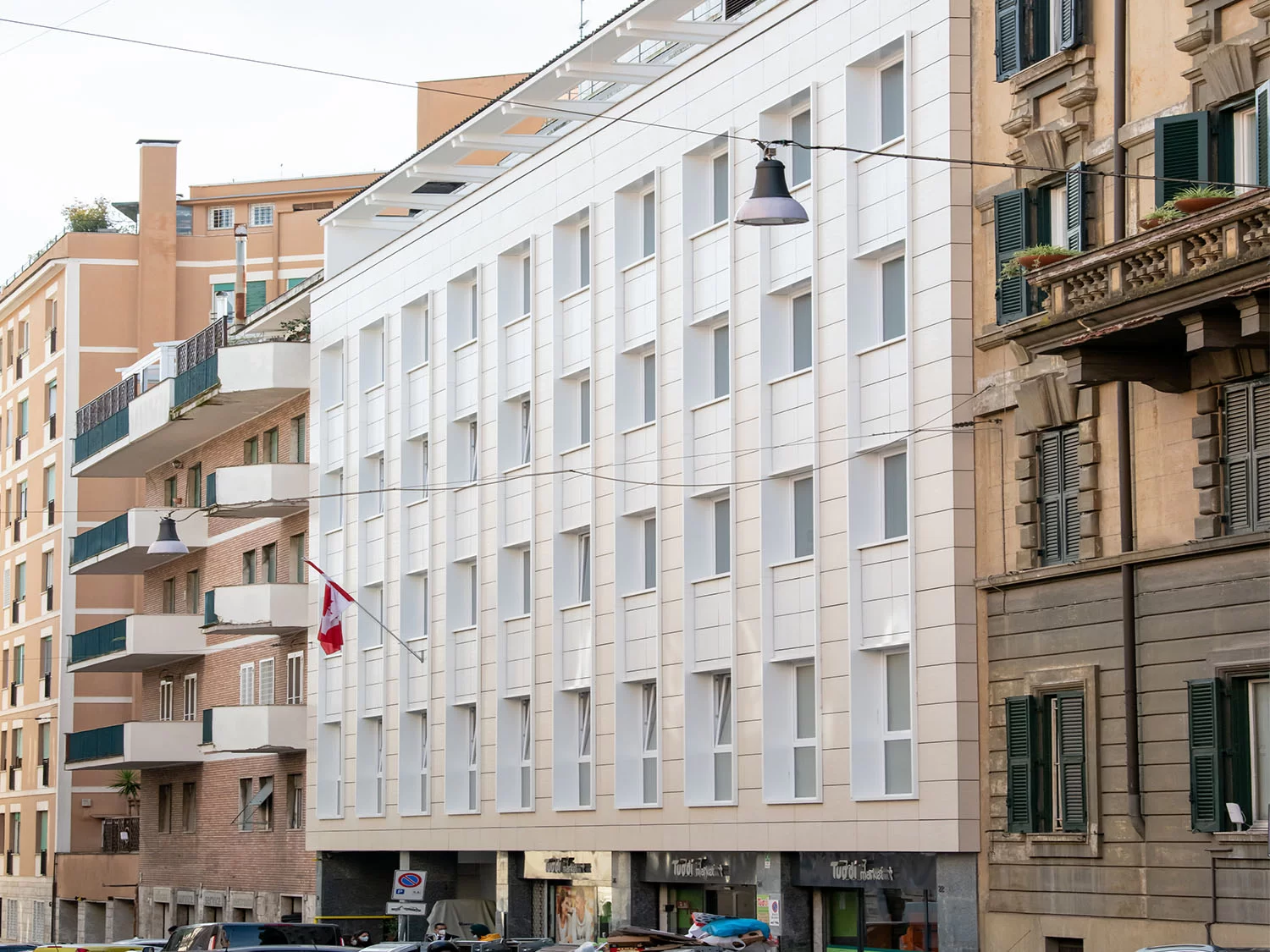
Embassy of Canada

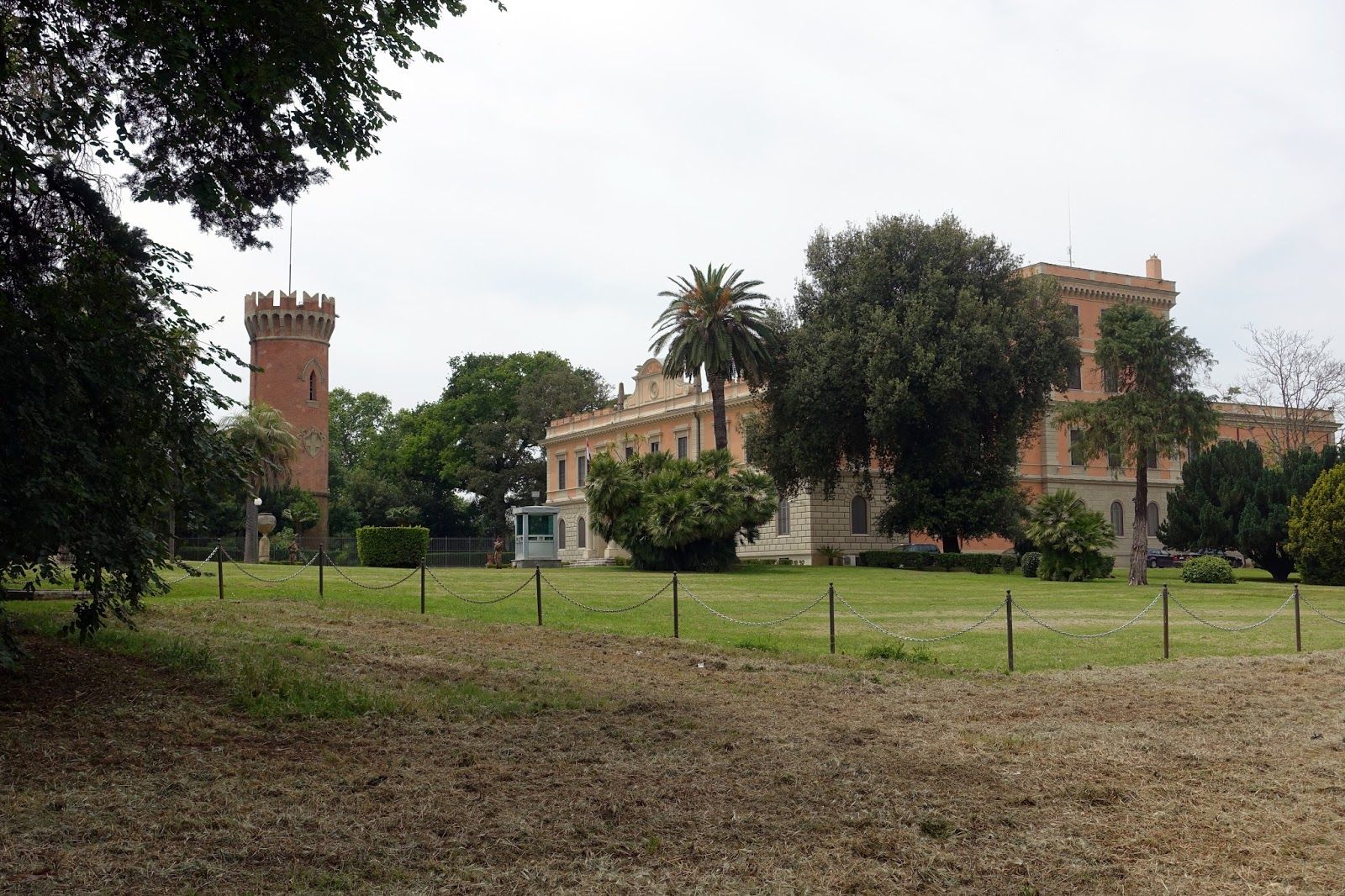
Embassy of Egypt

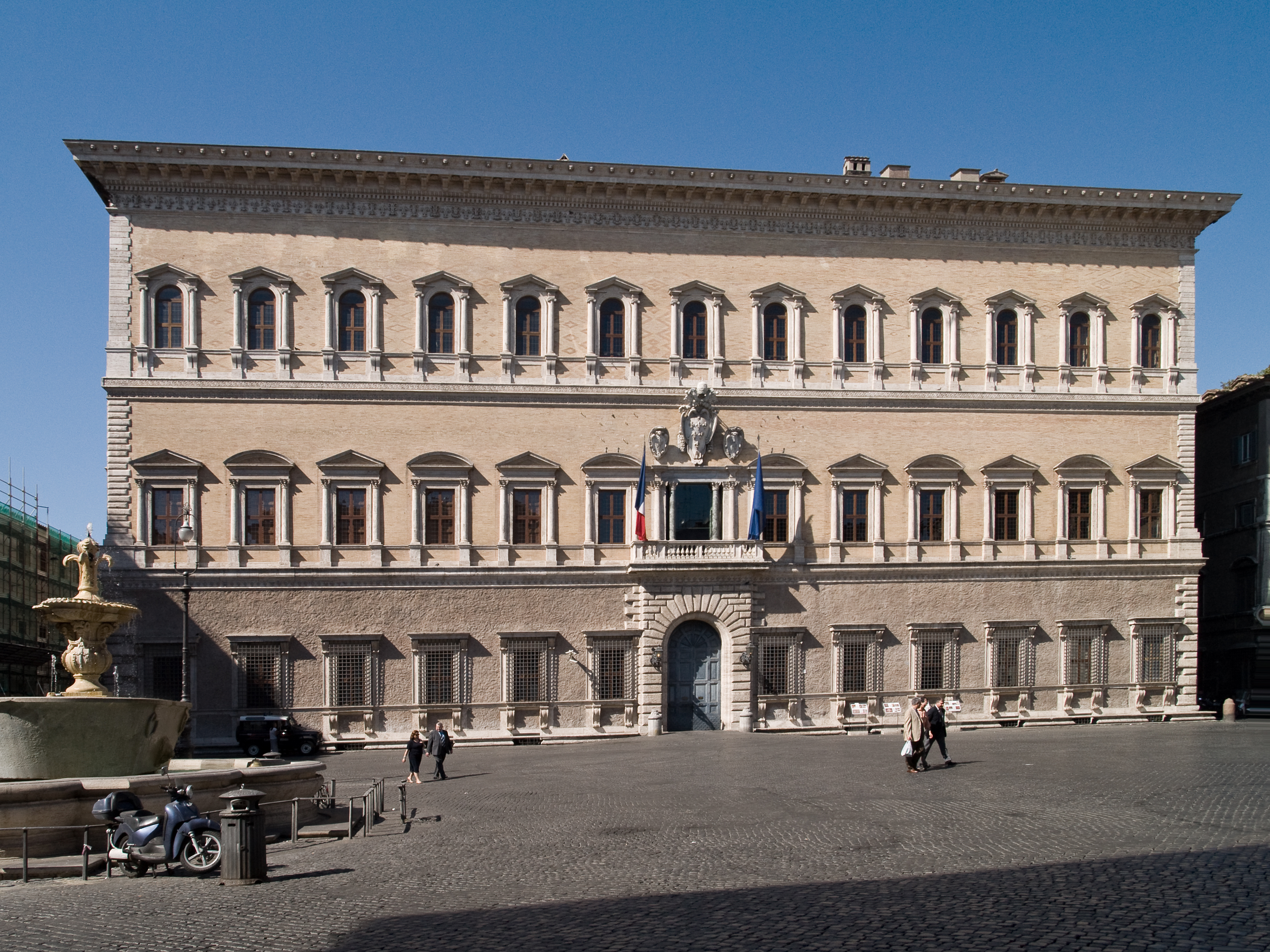
Embassy of France

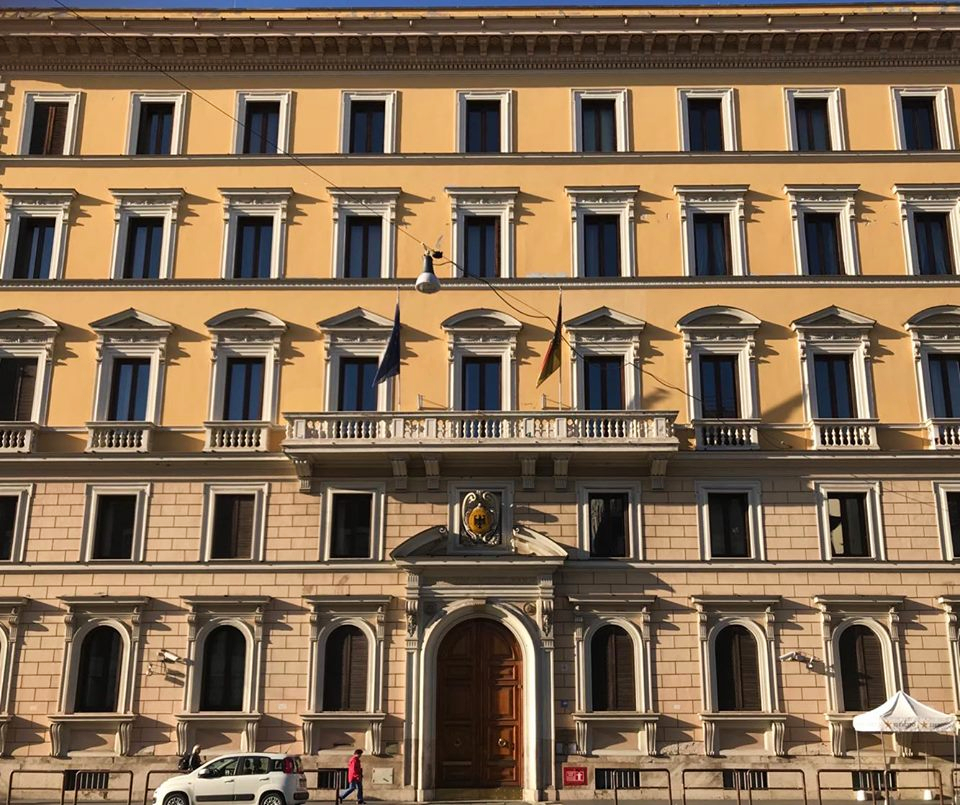
Embassy of Germany

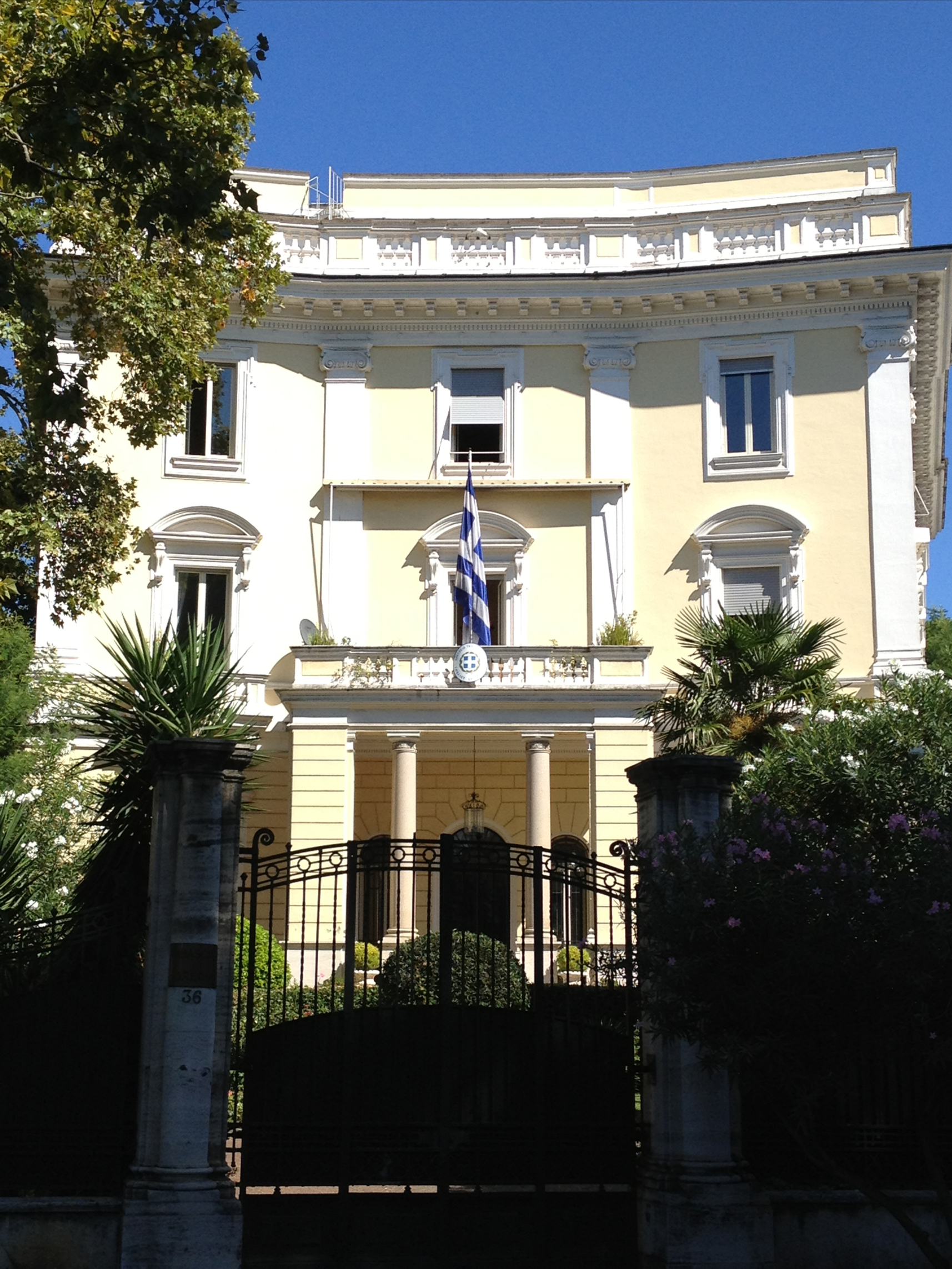
Embassy of Greece

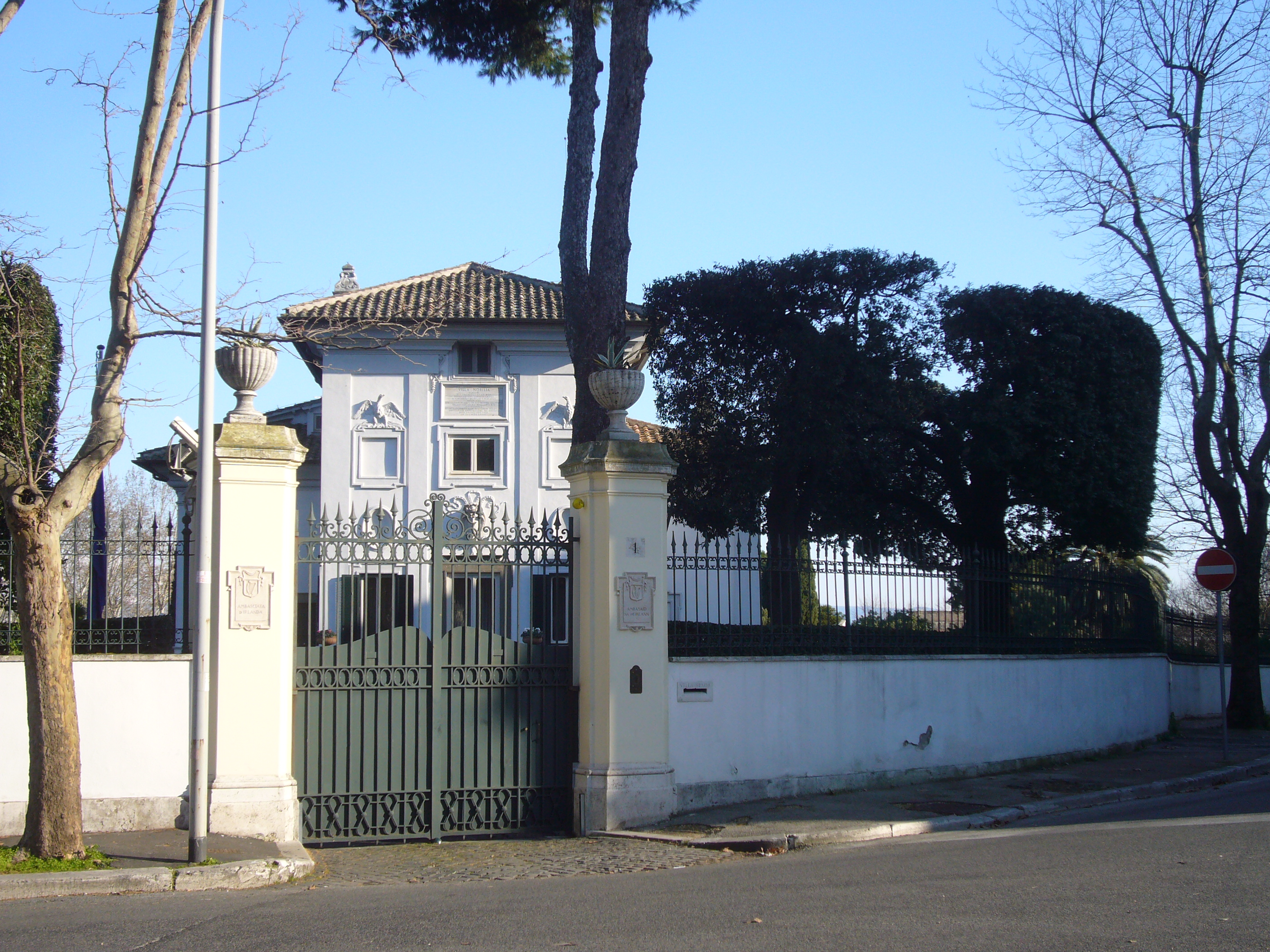
Embassy of Ireland

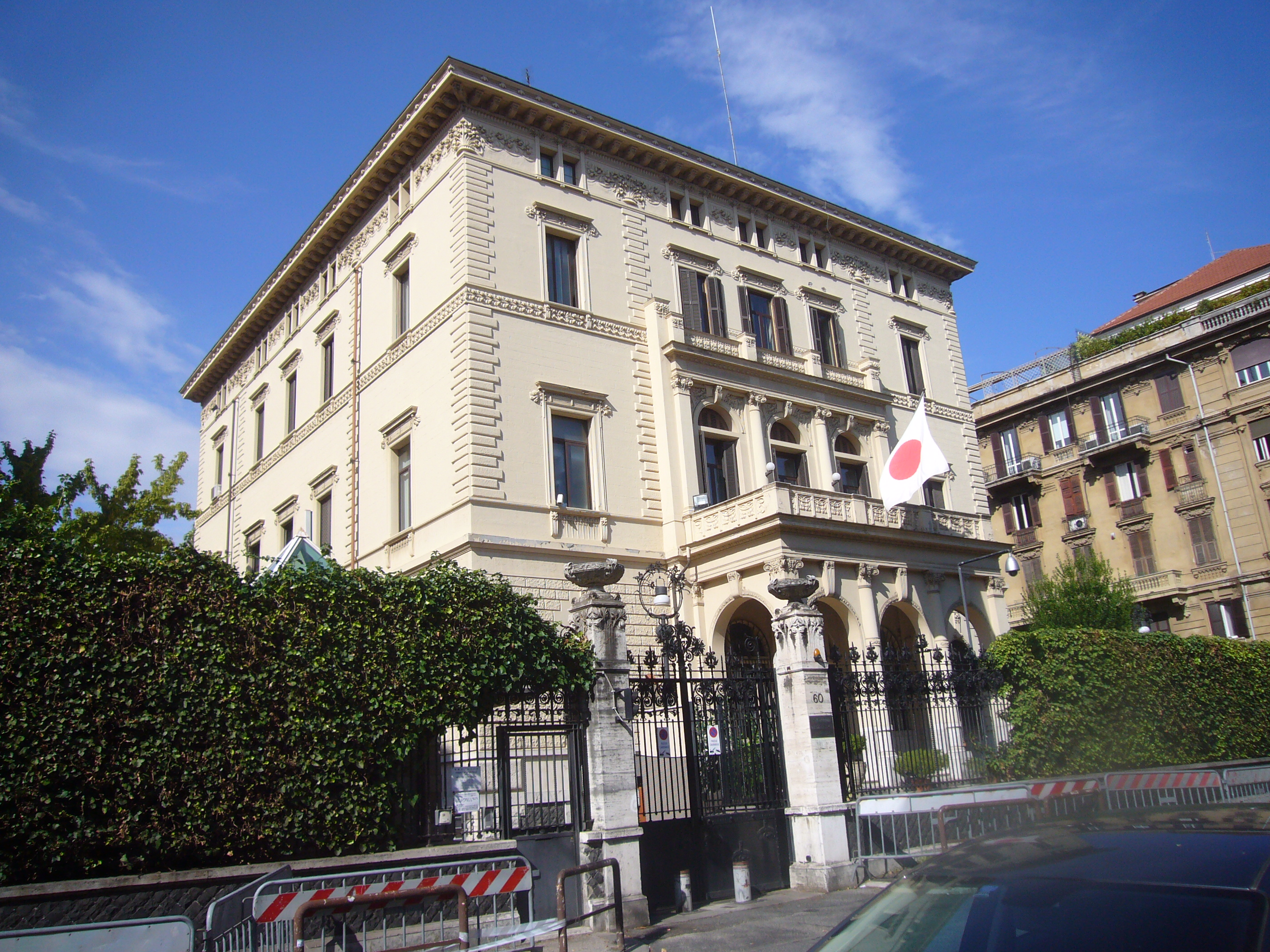
Embassy of Japan

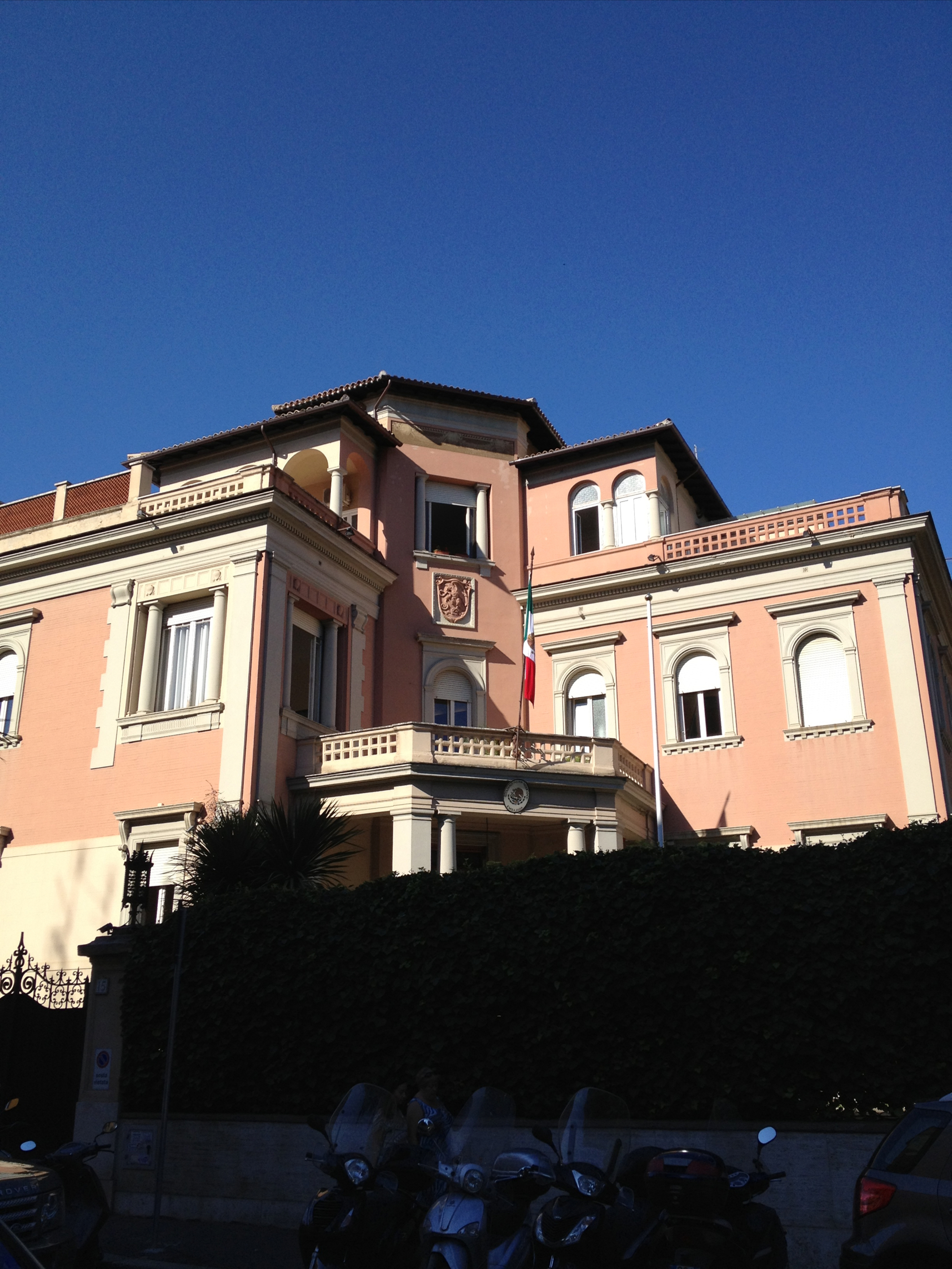
Embassy of Mexico

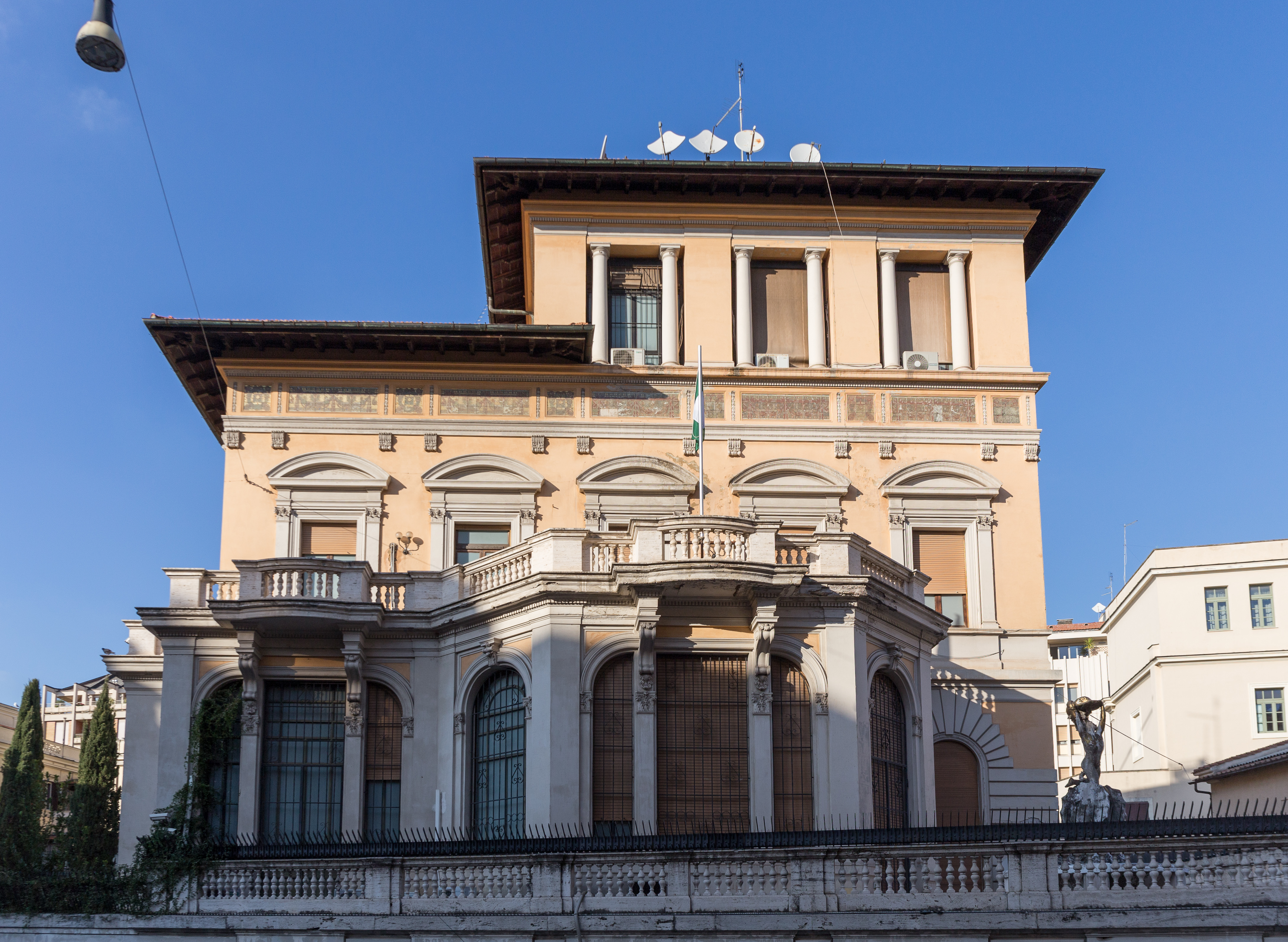
Embassy of Nigeria

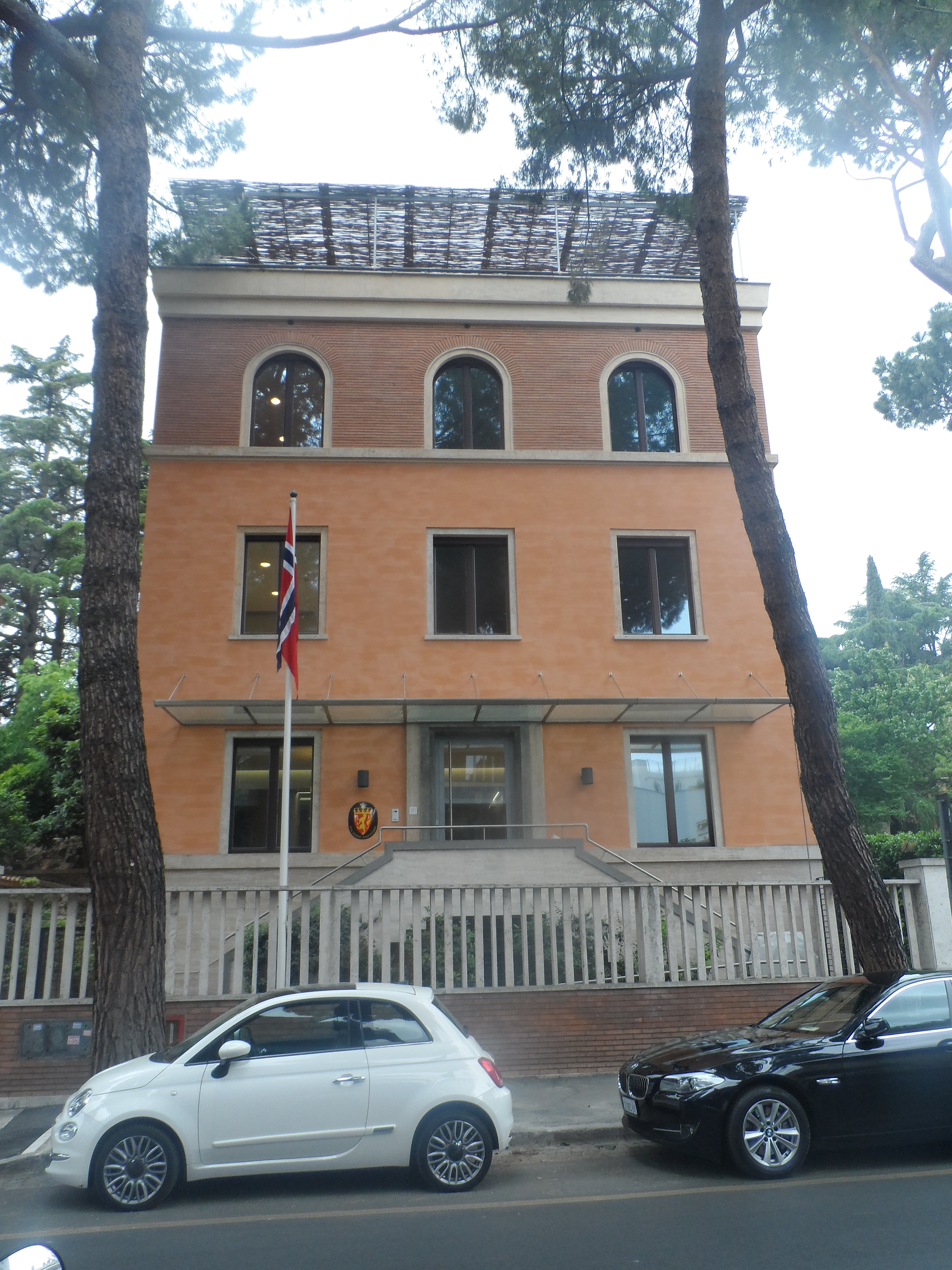
Embassy of Norway

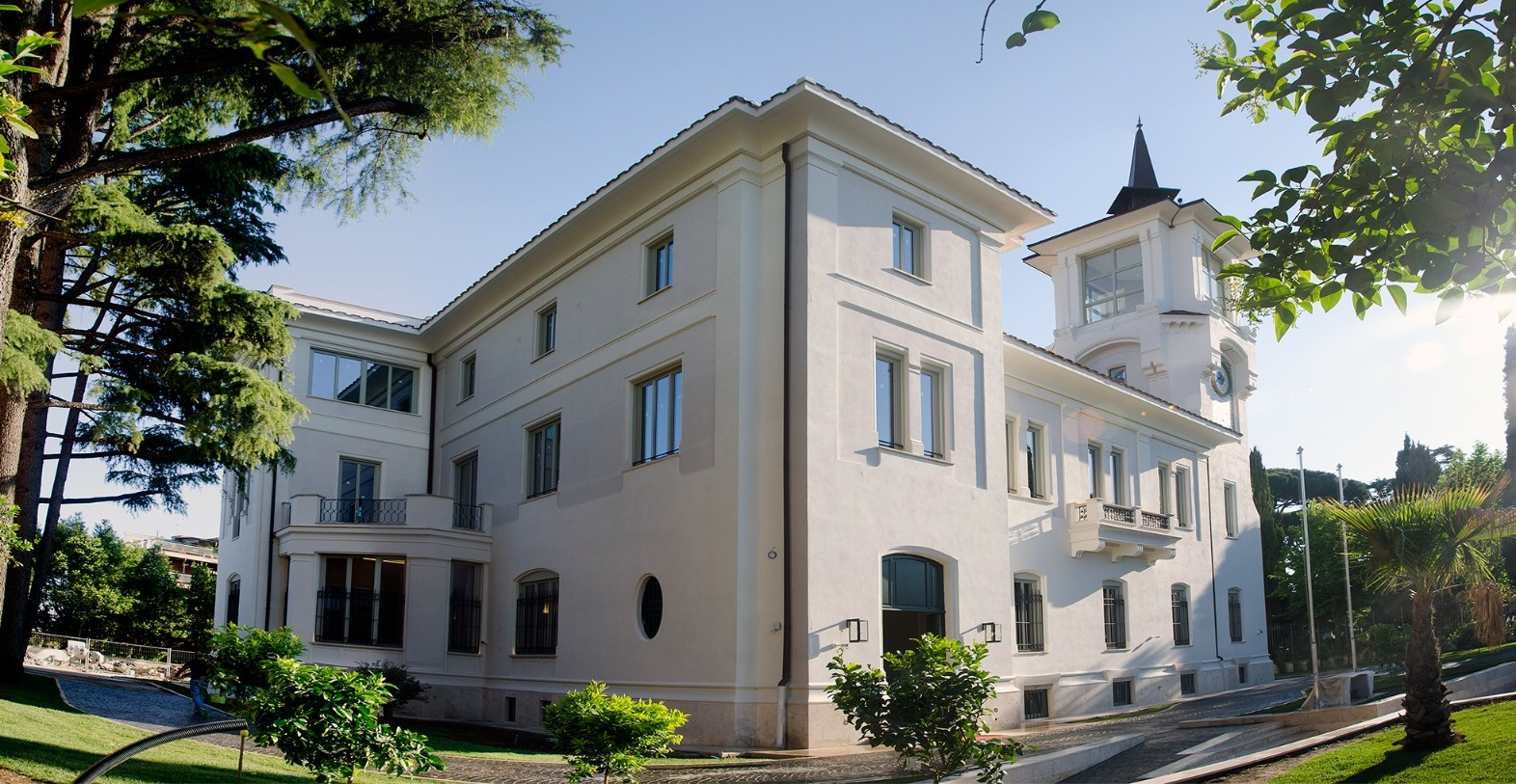
Embassy of the Philippines

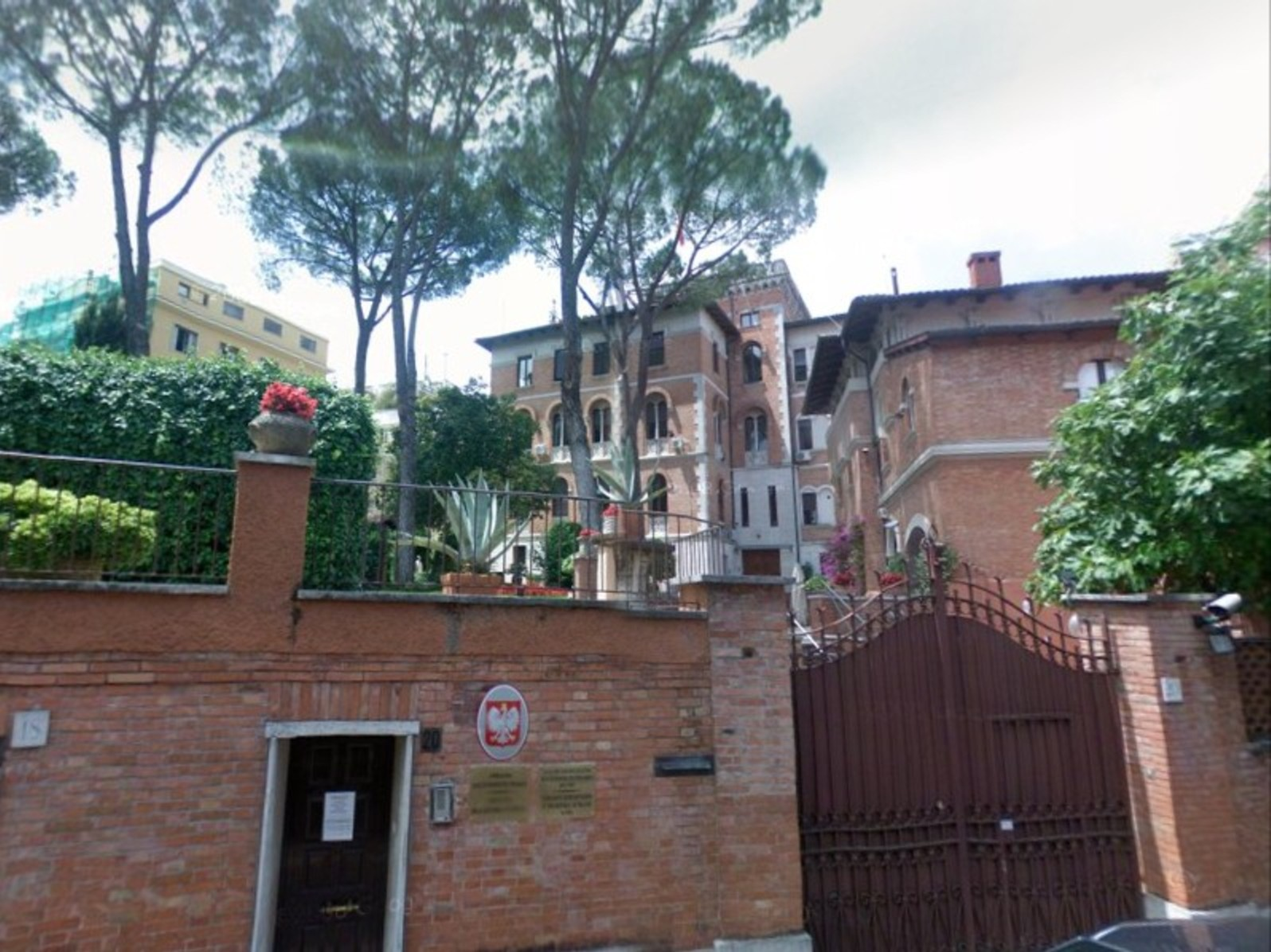
Embassy of Poland

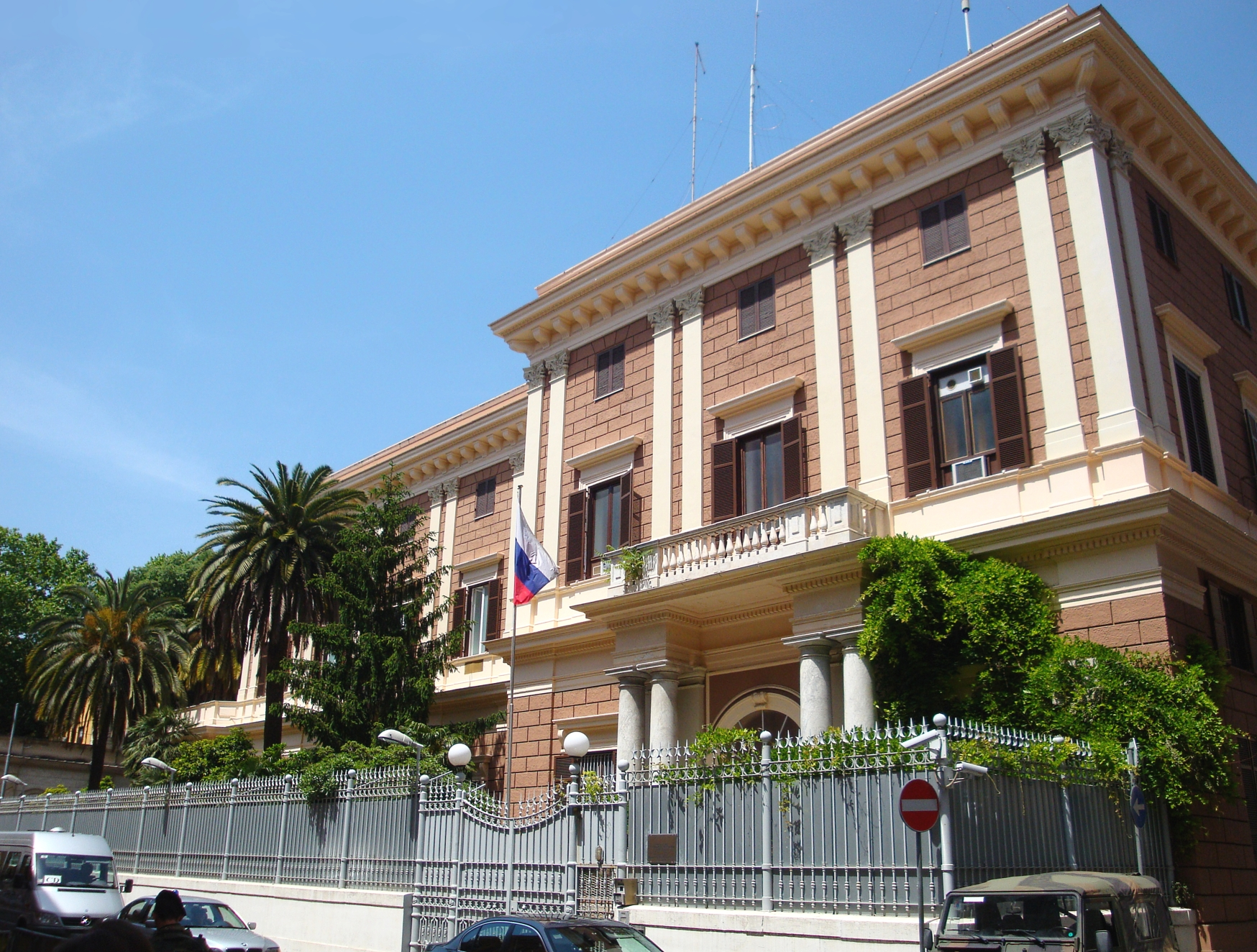
Embassy of Russia

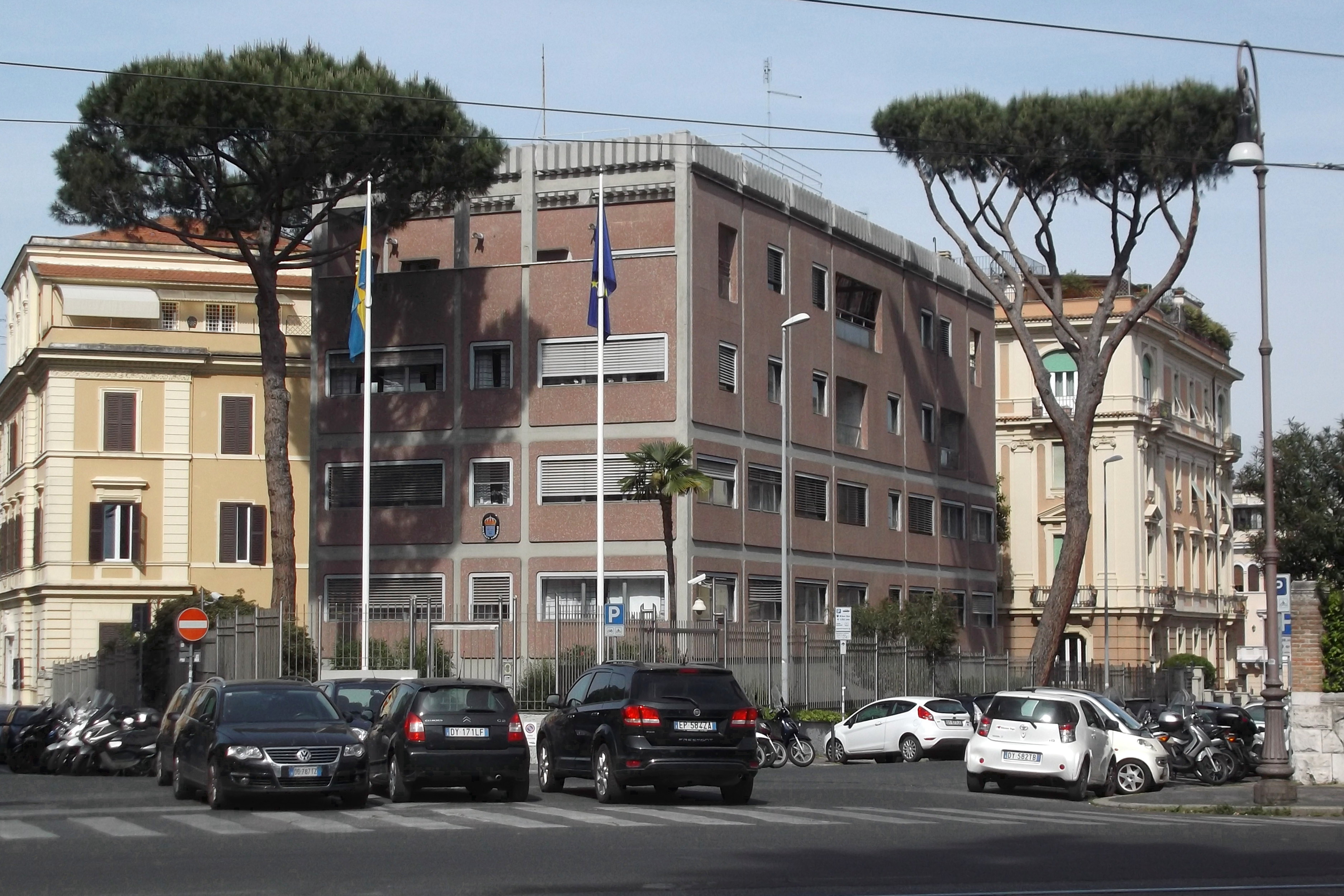
Embassy of Sweden

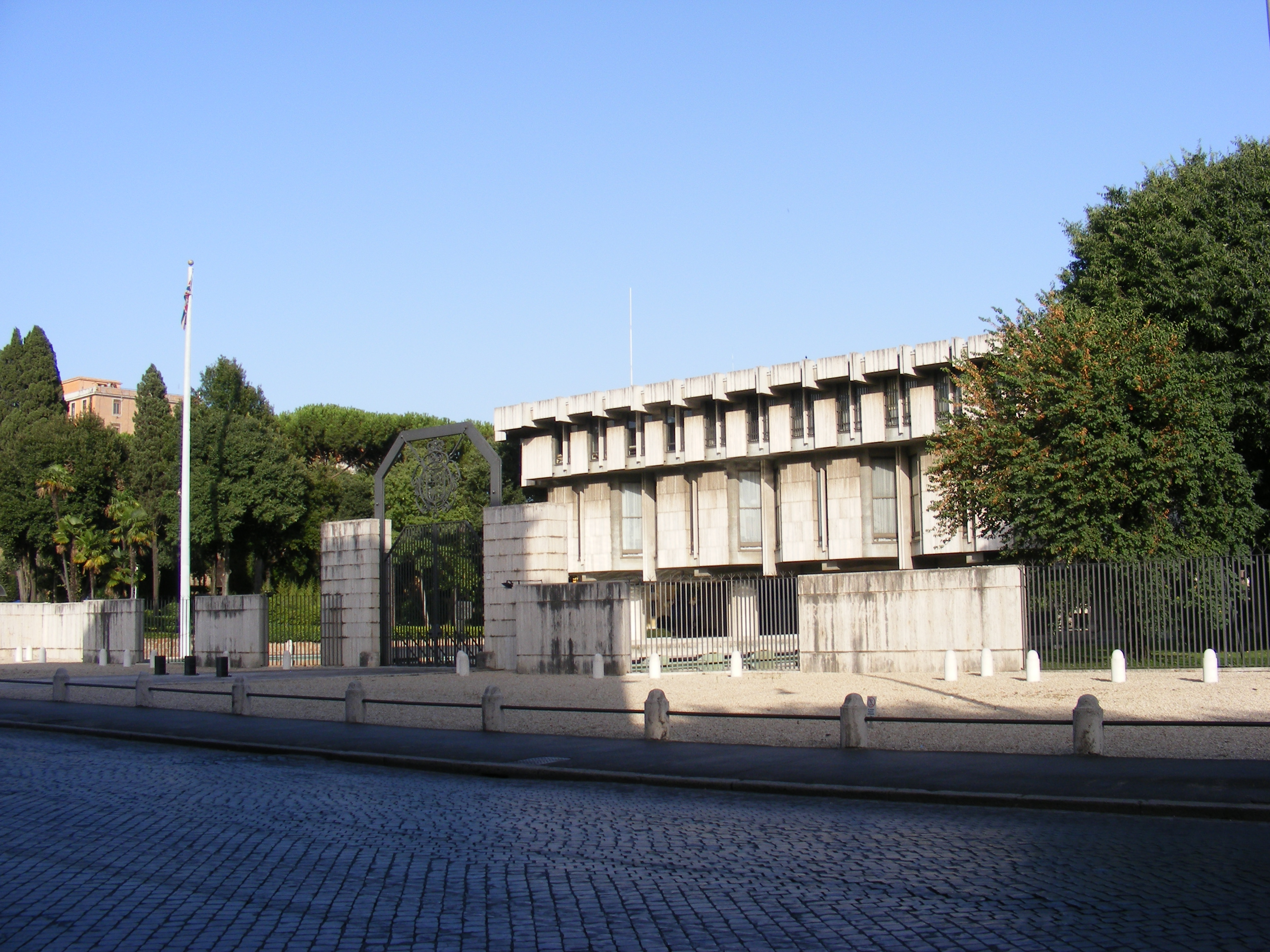
Embassy of the United Kingdom

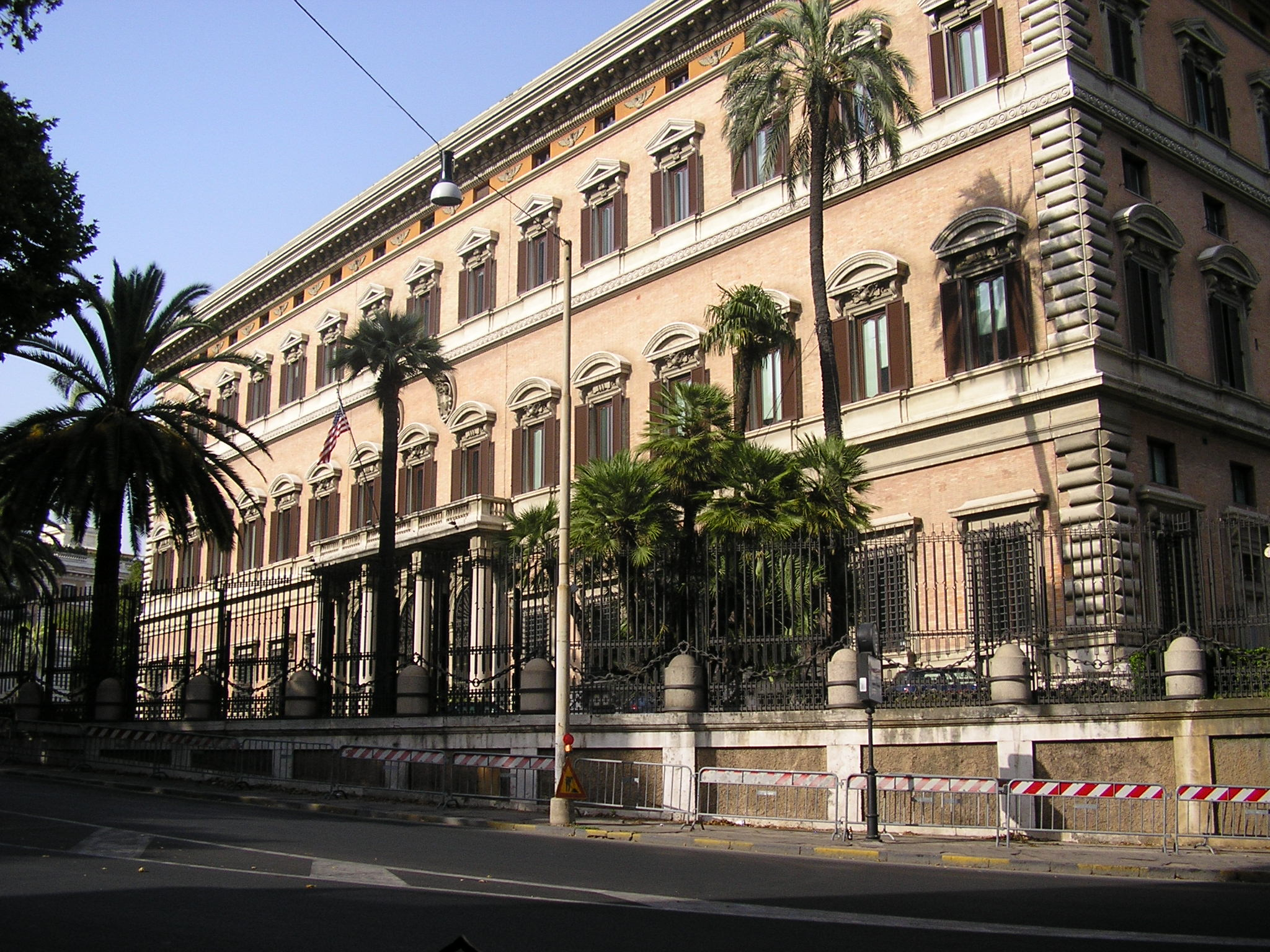
Embassy of the United States

== Consular missions ==
The following cities are host to career consular missions. All are consulates-general unless otherwise indicated.

=== Bari ===
- Albania
- Kosovo (Consular office)
- Romania

=== Bologna ===
- Morocco
- Montenegro (Consulate)
- Romania

=== Catania ===
- Romania (Consulate)

=== Florence ===
- China
- France
- Peru
- United States (Consulate-General)
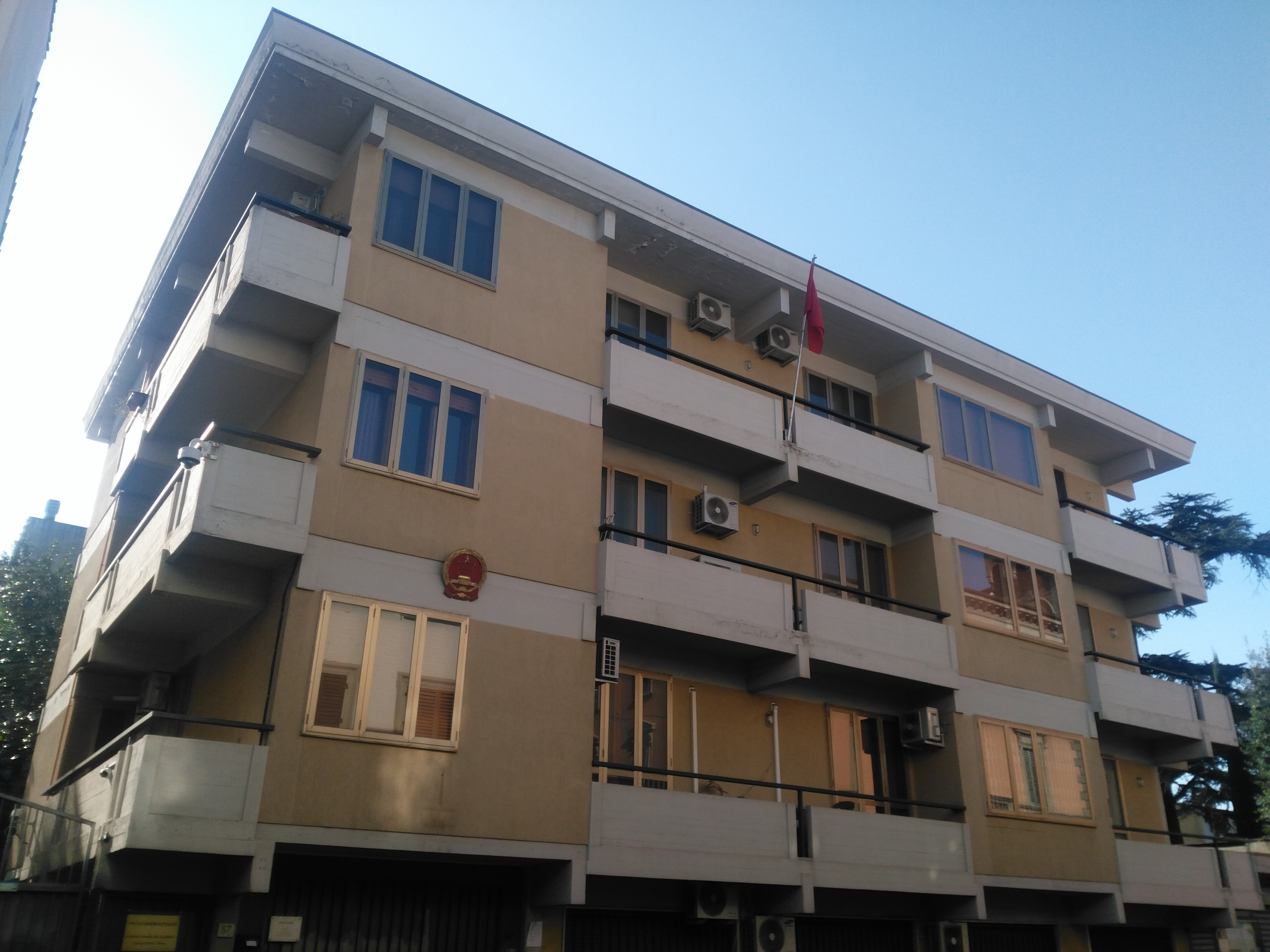
Consulate-General of China

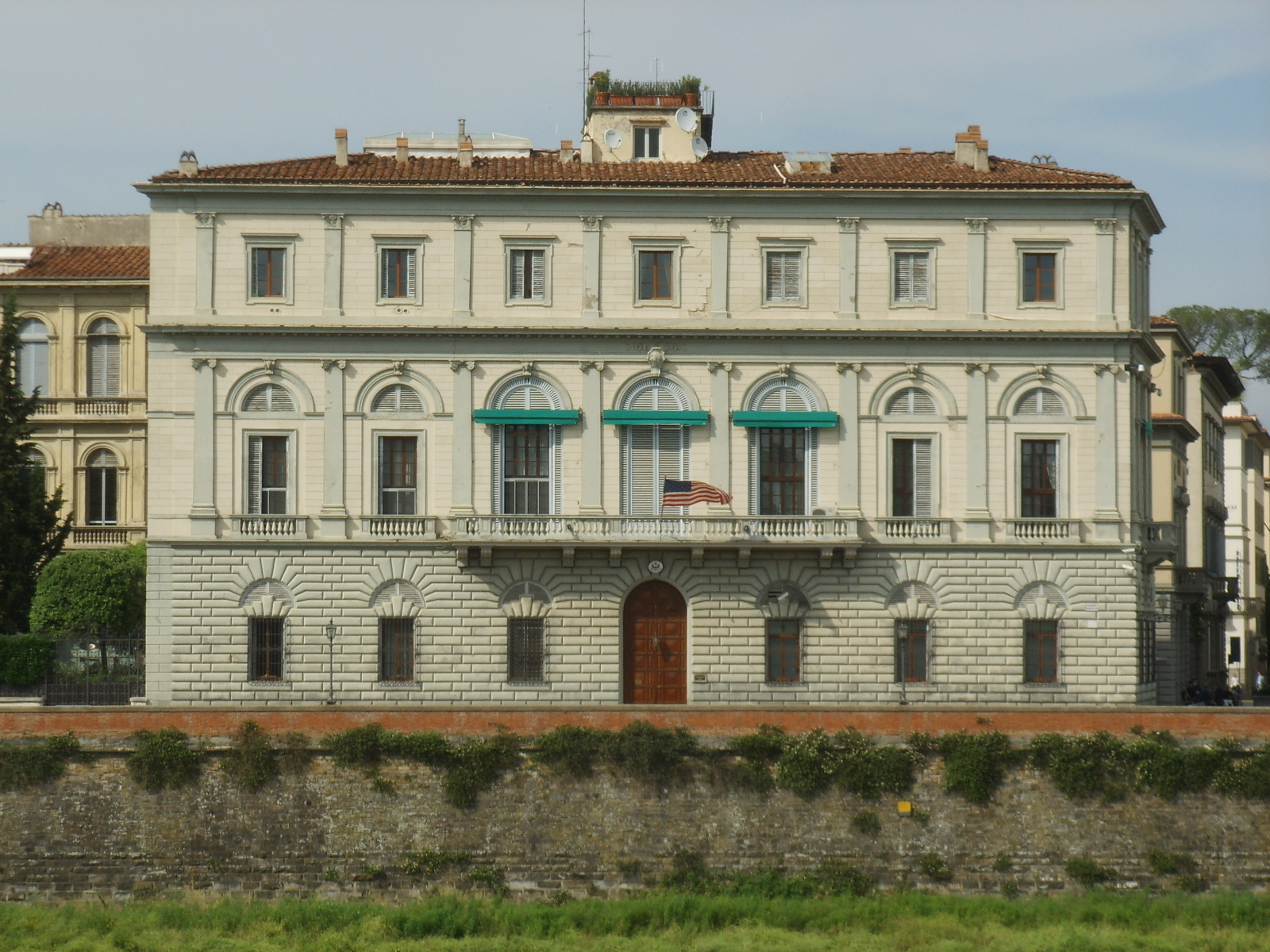
Consulate-General of the United States

=== Genoa ===
- Dominican Republic
- Ecuador
- Panama
- Peru
- Russia (Consulate)
- Tunisia (Consulate)

=== Milan ===
1. Albania
2. Algeria
3. Argentina
4. Armenia
5. Australia
6. Austria
7. Bangladesh
8. Bolivia
9. Bosnia and Herzegovina
10. Brazil
11. Bulgaria
12. Burkina Faso
13. Canada
14. Chile
15. China
16. Colombia
17. Croatia
18. Cuba
19. Czechia
20. Denmark
21. Dominican Republic
22. Ecuador
23. Egypt
24. El Salvador
25. Eritrea
26. France
27. Germany
28. Hungary
29. India
30. Iran
31. Ireland
32. Japan
33. Kosovo
34. Kuwait
35. Lebanon
36. Libya
37. Malaysia (Consulate)
38. Mexico
39. Moldova
40. Morocco
41. Netherlands
42. New Zealand
43. Pakistan
44. Peru
45. Philippines
46. Poland
47. Qatar
48. Romania
49. Russia
50. Senegal
51. Serbia
52. Slovenia
53. Republic of Korea
54. Spain
55. Sri Lanka
56. Switzerland
57. Taiwan (Taipei Representative Office)
58. Tunisia (Consulate)
59. Turkey
60. Ukraine
61. United Kingdom
62. United States
63. Uruguay
64. Venezuela
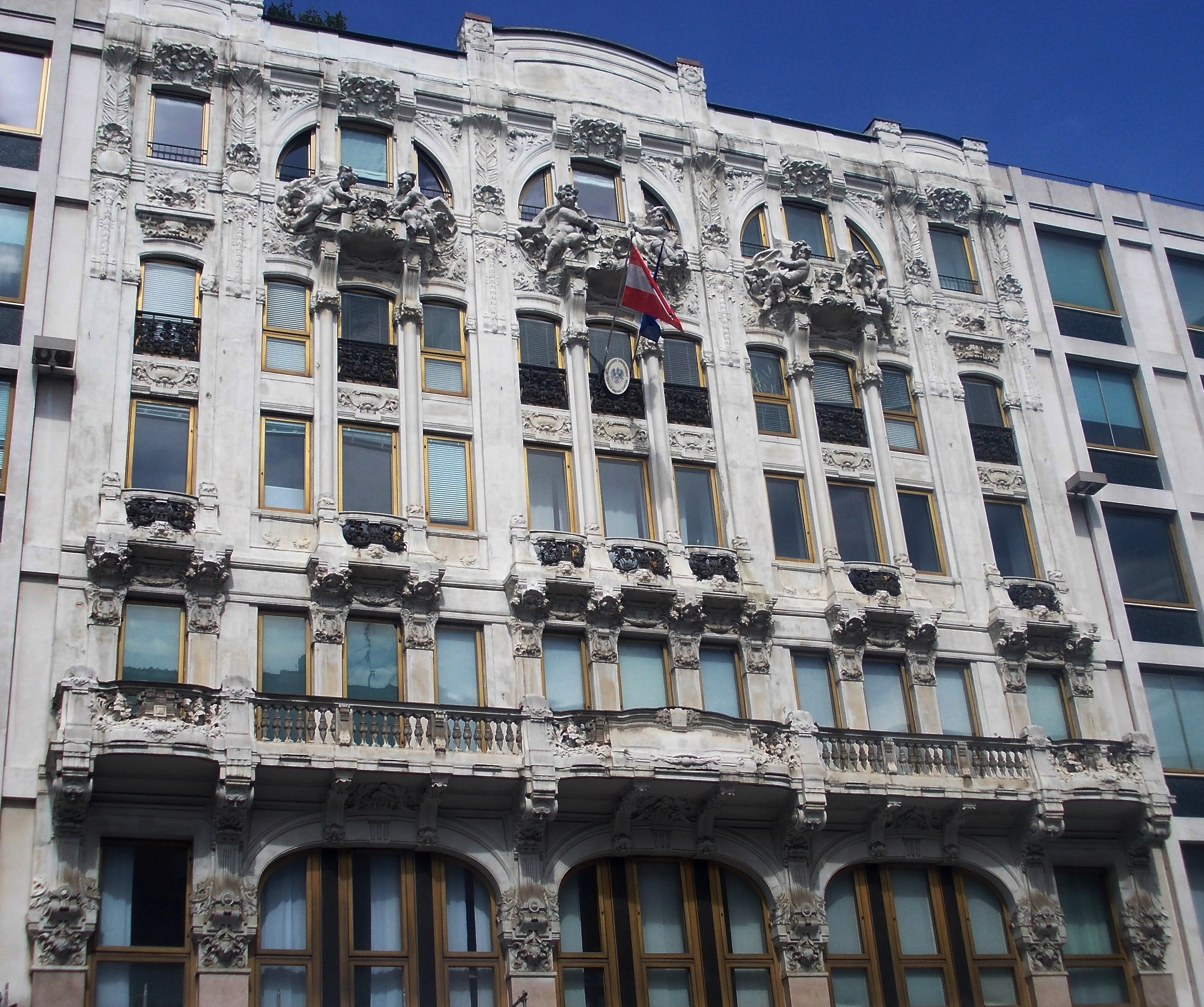
Consulate-General of Austria

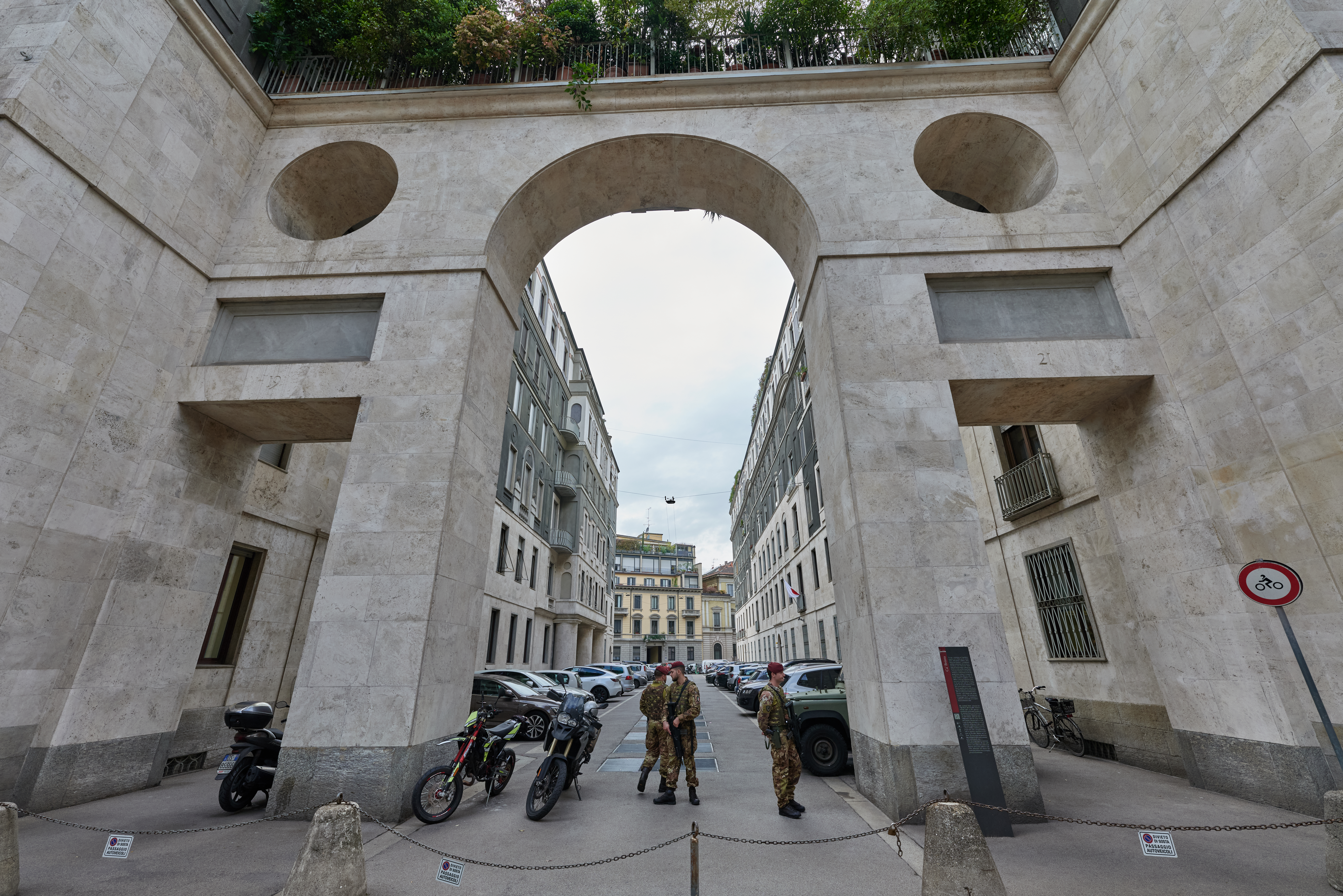
Consulate-General of Japan (right side)

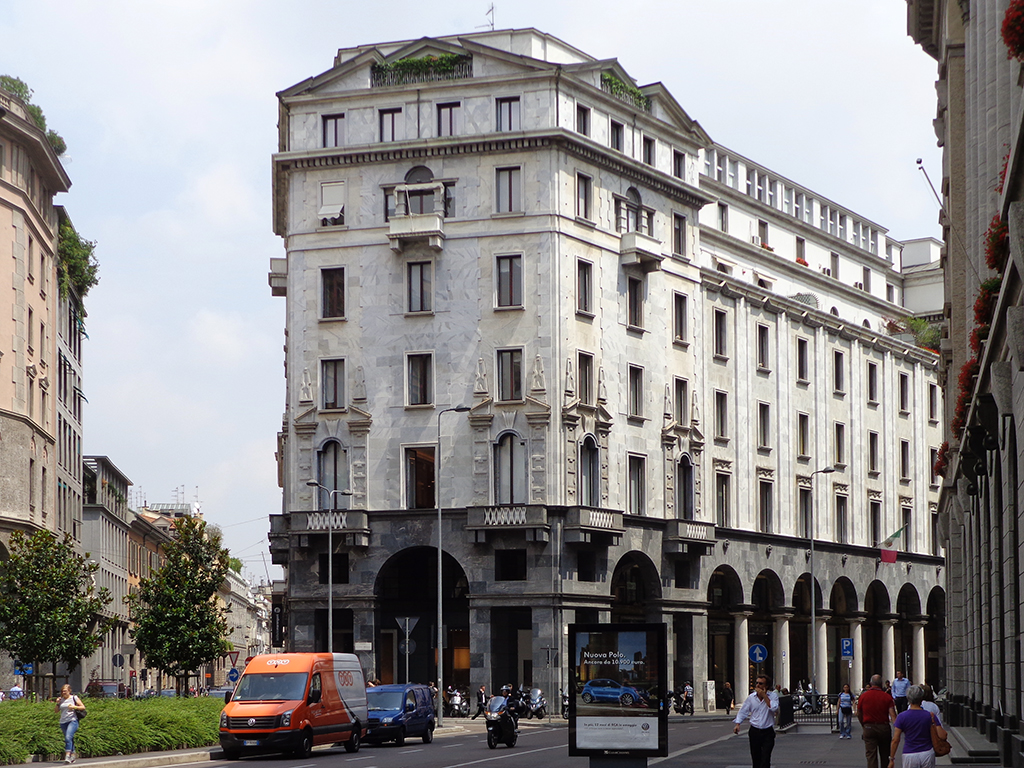
Building hosting the Consulate-General of Mexico

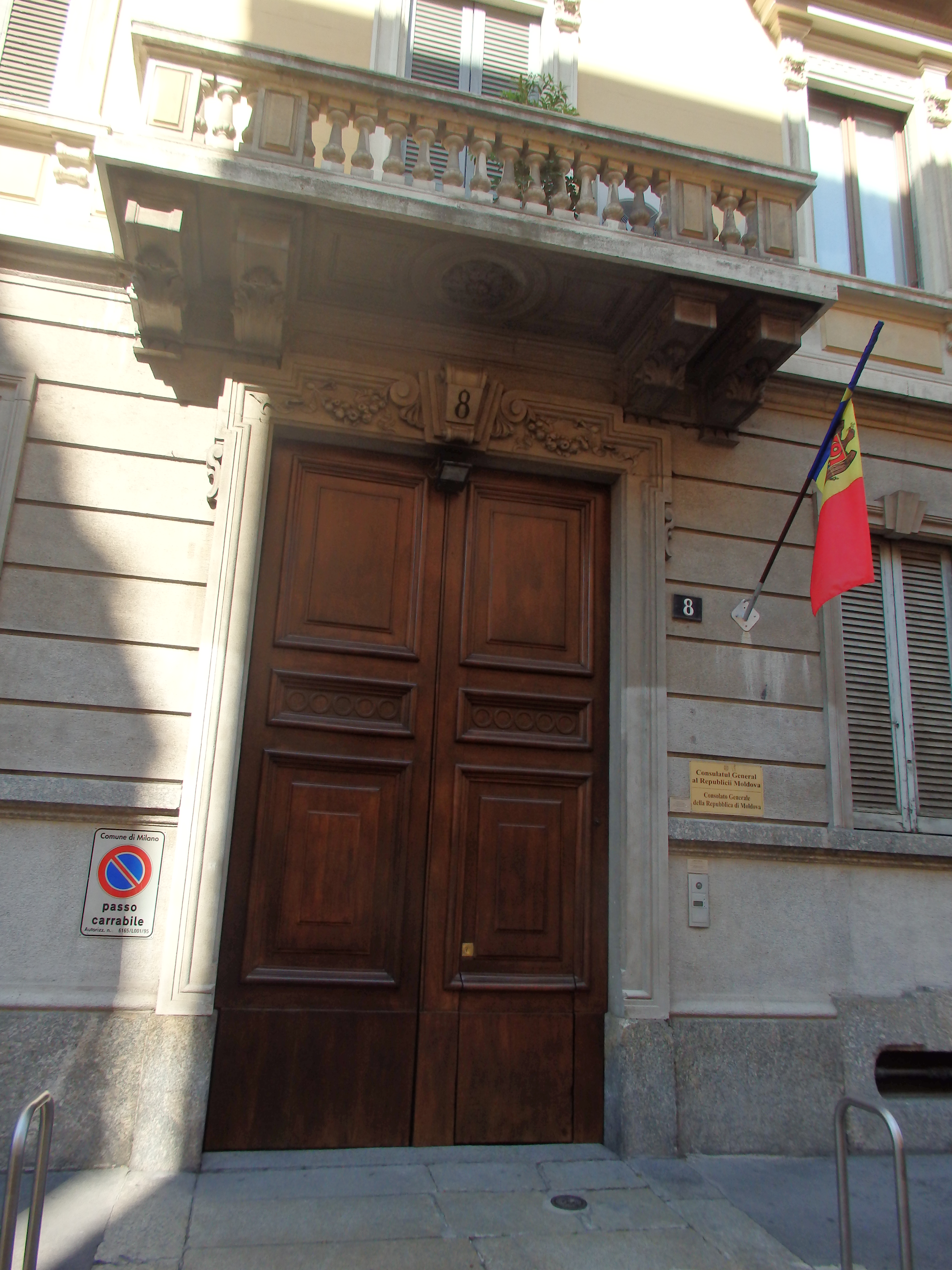
Consulate-General of Moldova

Building hosting the Consulate-General of Spain

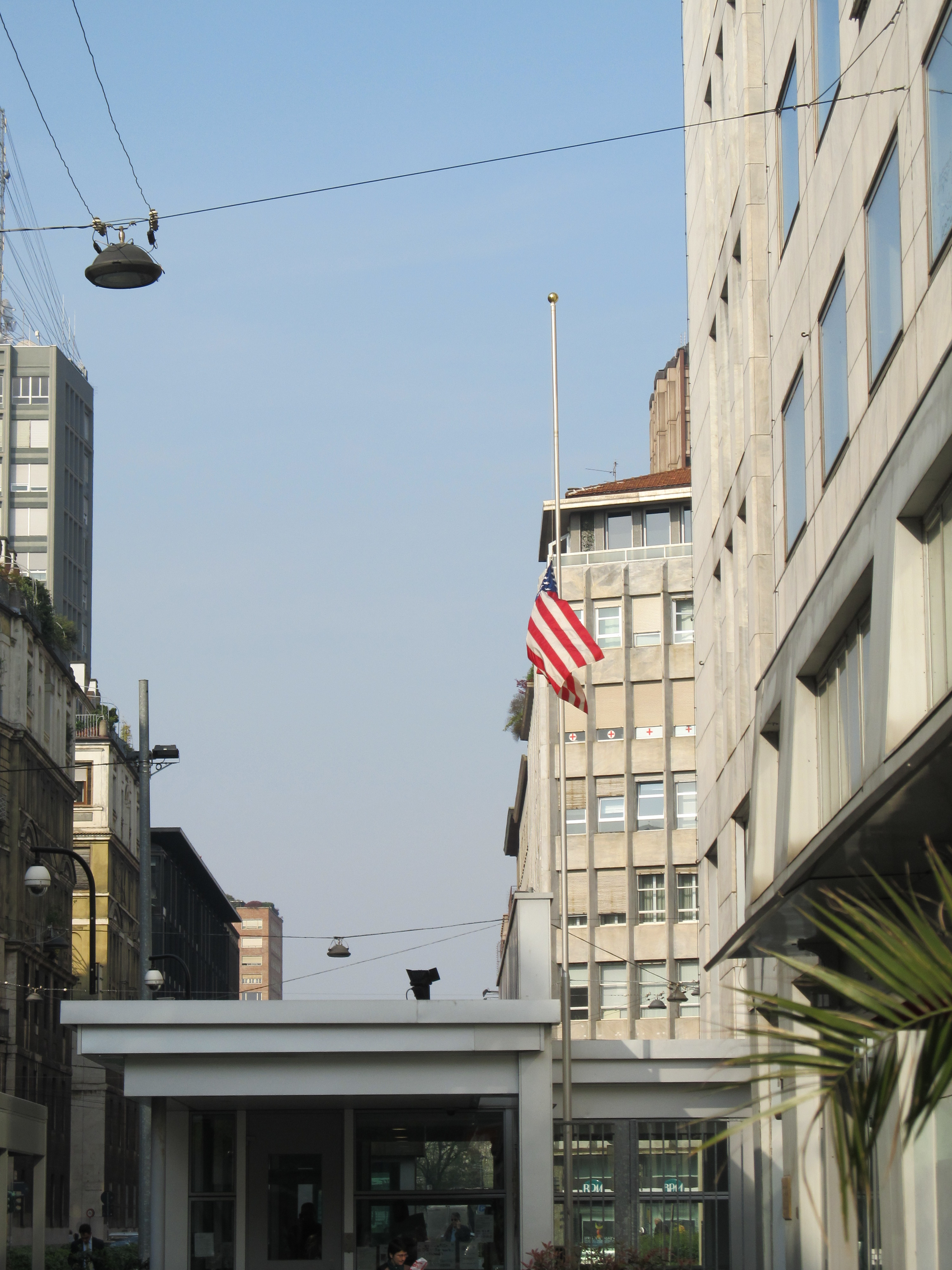
Consulate-General of the United States

=== Naples ===
1. Algeria
2. France
3. Spain
4. Morocco
5. Panama
6. Senegal
7. Tunisia (Consulate)
8. Ukraine
9. United States
10. Venezuela

=== Padua ===
- Moldova

=== Palermo ===
- Libya
- Morocco
- Russia
- Tunisia (Consulate)
- United States (Consular agency)

=== Trieste ===
- Croatia
- Romania
- Serbia
- Slovenia

=== Turin ===
- Morocco
- Peru
- Romania

=== Venice ===
- North Macedonia
- Panama
- United States (Consular agency)

=== Verona ===
- Morocco

== Non-resident embassies accredited to Italy ==
=== Resident in Brussels, Belgium ===
1. Barbados
2. Botswana
3. Fiji
4. Malawi
5. Papua New Guinea
6. Samoa
7. Saint Kitts and Nevis
8. São Tomé and Príncipe
9. Vanuatu

=== Resident in Paris, France ===
1. Brunei
2. Cambodia
3. Central African Republic
4. Comoros
5. Djibouti
6. Mauritius
7. Namibia
8. Rwanda
9. Seychelles
10. Suriname
11. Togo

=== Resident in Geneva, Switzerland (Note: Accredited missions are the sending countries's permanent missions to the United Nations Office at Geneva) ===
1. Guyana
2. Jamaica
3. Laos
4. Maldives
5. Nepal
6. Trinidad and Tobago

=== Resident in London, United Kingdom ===
1. Bahamas
2. Eswatini
3. Tonga

=== Resident in other cities ===
1. Andorra (Andorra la Vella)
2. Antigua and Barbuda (St John's)
3. Chad (Berlin)
4. Gambia (Madrid)
5. Guinea-Bissau (Lisbon)
6. Sierra Leone (Berlin)
7. Singapore (Singapore)

== Embassies to the Holy See ==
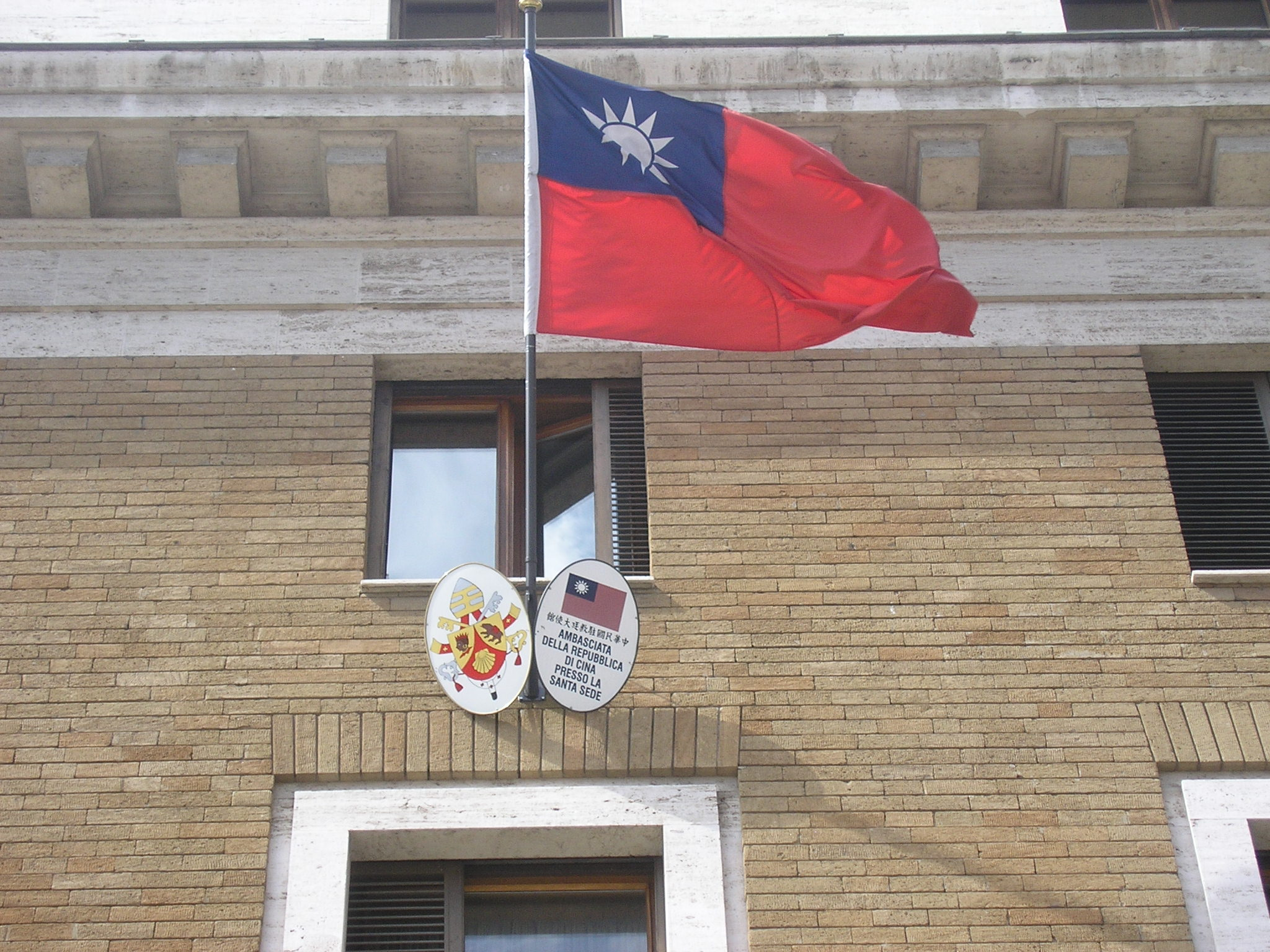
Like many embassies to the Vatican City, the Republic of China's embassy to the Holy See is actually located in Rome, outside the borders of the Vatican and in a country with which the ROC has no official diplomatic recognition.

The Vatican City State, governed by the Holy See, does not possess sufficient territory to host diplomatic missions, so diplomatic missions accredited to the Holy See are based in Rome.

== Closed missions ==
Host city	Sending country	Mission	Year closed	Ref.
Rome	Benin	Embassy	2020	
Rome	Kingdom of Nepal	Embassy	1967	
Rome	Nicaragua	Embassy	2026	
Rome	Rwanda	Embassy	Unknown	
Rome	Syria	Embassy	2013	
Catania	Poland	Consulate-General	2009	
Florence	United Kingdom	Consulate	2011	
Genoa	Colombia	Consulate-General	1990	
Genoa	Spain	Consulate-General	2021	
Genoa	Sweden	Consulate-General	1981	
Genoa	Switzerland	Consulate-General	2014	
Genoa	United States	Consulate-General	1993	
Milan	Belarus	Consulate-General	2018	
Milan	Greece	Consulate-General	Unknown	
Milan	Sweden	Consulate-General	1995	
Naples	Germany	Consulate-General	2013	
Naples	Greece	Consulate-General	2011	
Naples	Switzerland	Consulate-General	2007	
Naples	United Kingdom	Consulate	2012	
Palermo	United States	Consulate	1994	
Trieste	France	Consulate-General	1998	
Turin	United Kingdom	Consulate	2006	
Venice	France	Consulate-General	1998	
Venice	Greece	Consulate	Unknown	
Venice	Empire of Japan	Embassy	1945 or sooner	
Venice	United Kingdom	Consulate-General	2011	

== See also ==
- Foreign relations of Italy
- List of diplomatic missions of Italy
- Visa requirements for Italian citizens
