= Embassy of Indonesia to the Holy See =

Embassy of the Republic of Indonesia to the Holy See Kedutaan Besar Republik Indonesia untuk Takhta Suci Ambasciata della Repubblica di Indonesia presso la Santa Sede
- Location: Rome, Italy
- Address: Via Marocco 10; 00144 Rome, Italy
- Coordinates: 41.81963°N 12.465869°E
- Ambassador: Michael Trias Kuncahyono
- Jurisdiction: Holy See
- Website: kemlu.go.id/vatican

Embassy of the Republic of Indonesia to the Holy See (Indonesian: Kedutaan Besar Republik Indonesia untuk Takhta Suci) is the diplomatic mission of the Republic of Indonesia to the Holy See, the universal ecclesiastical jurisdiction over the Catholic Church and the sovereign city-state of Vatican City. The embassy is located outside the Vatican City territory in the Italian capital of Rome. The mission is currently headed by Ambassador Michael Trias Kuncahyono which was sworn in by President Joko Widodo on 26 June 2023.

== History ==
Before Indonesia's independence, the Holy See sent an Apostolic Delegation to the Dutch East Indies in 1947. Diplomatic relations between Indonesia and the Holy See were established after the Holy See recognized Indonesia's sovereignty on 16 March 1950. Indonesia's inaugural ambassador was Sukarjo Wiryopranoto whom took office from 1950 until 1952.

== See also ==
- Holy See–Indonesia relations
- List of diplomatic missions of Indonesia
- List of diplomatic missions of the Holy See
