= Sacro Cuore del Suffragio =

Roman Catholic church building in Rome, Italy

Chiesa del Sacro Cuore di Gesù in Prati
- Church of the Sacred Heart of Jesus in Prati (in English)
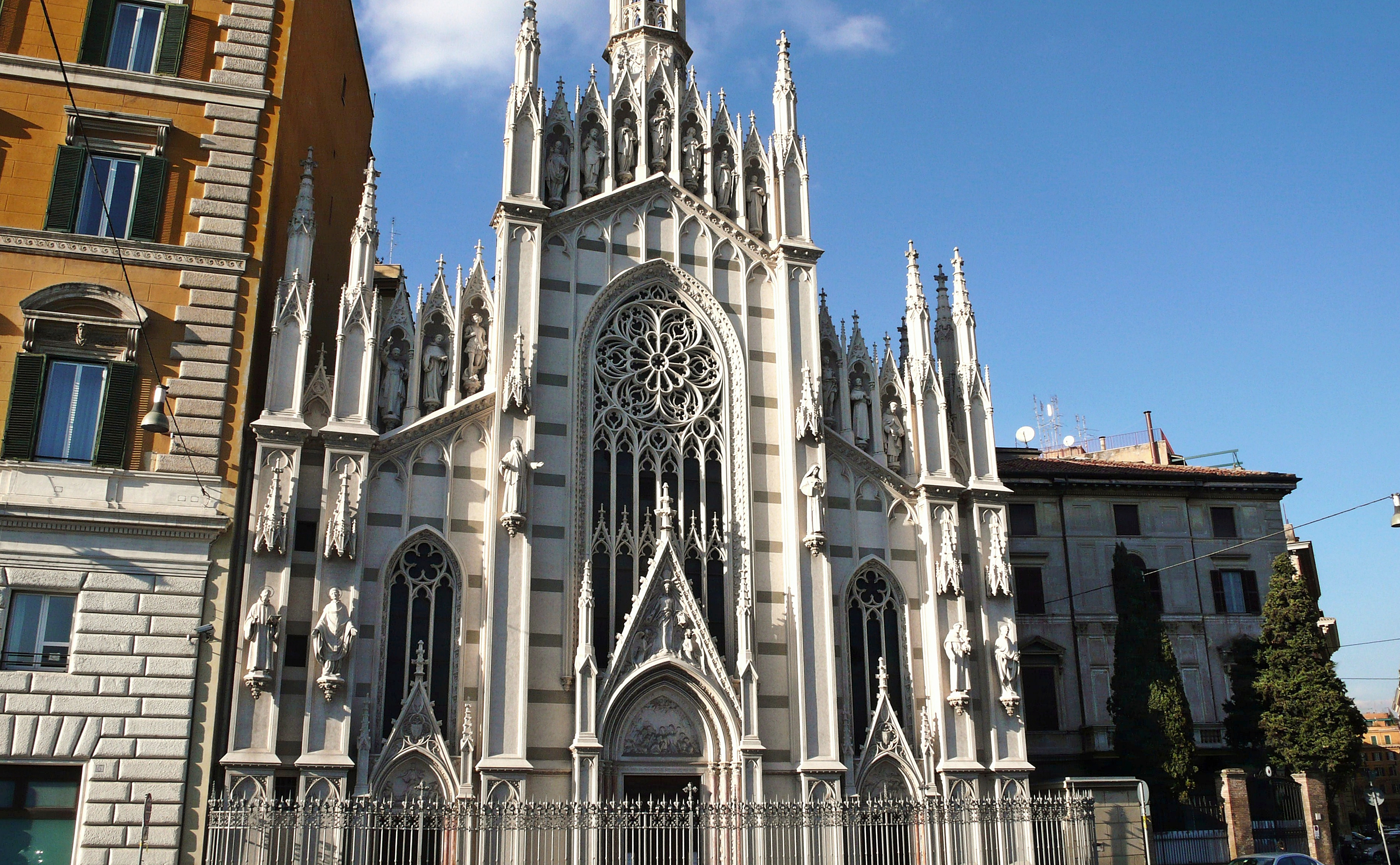
- Façade of the church
- Click on the map for a fullscreen view
- 41°54′15.08″N 12°28′20.37″E
- Location: Rome
- Country: Italy
- Denomination: Roman Catholic
- Tradition: Roman Rite

History
- Dedication: Missionaries of the Sacred Heart
- Consecrated: 1921

Architecture
- Architect: Giuseppe Gualandi
- Architectural type: Church
- Style: Neogothic
- Groundbreaking: 1908
- Completed: 1917

Administration
- Province: Rome

Sacro Cuore di Gesù in Prati (Italian for "Sacred Heart of Jesus in Prati"), also known as Sacro Cuore del Suffragio (Italian for "Sacred Heart of the Suffrage"), is a Catholic church in the centre of Rome (Italy), rising in the rione Prati, hosting the parish with the same name, entrusted to the Missionaries of the Sacred Heart.

The church, designed by engineer Giuseppe Gualandi, is sometimes referred as the little Milan Cathedral, due to its rich neogothic style.

== History ==
In 1893, the Missionary of the Sacred Heart Victor Jouët, born in Marseille, founded in Rome the Associazione del Sacro Cuore del Suffragio delle Anime del Purgatorio (Italian for "Association of the Sacred Heart of the Suffrage of the Purgatory Souls"), having the aim to spread the worship to the Sacred Heart and to the Virgin Mary. The former oratory of the Association rose in Via dei Cosmati; a second one, used between 1896 and 1914, was located in Lungotevere Prati, into a ground that the founder had bought in order to build a bigger church, whose foundation stone was blessed in 1894 by Joseph-Jean-Louis Robert, Bishop of Marseille.

The construction of the new church began in 1908 and the design was committed to engineer Giuseppe Gualandi, who chose a style inspired by French Gothic architecture. In 1914, the Association moved to the church of St. Joseph Calasanz in Via Cavallini, since the old chapel was partially demolished in order to allow the completion of the new church; the building, completed in 1917, was blessed and opened to worship on November 1 of the same year. The parish was founded on December 10. On May 17, 1921, the church was consecrated by Pietro Benedetti, Archbishop of Tyre, its first vicar.

Pope John Paul II visited the church on February 1, 1998.

== Description ==
=== Façade ===
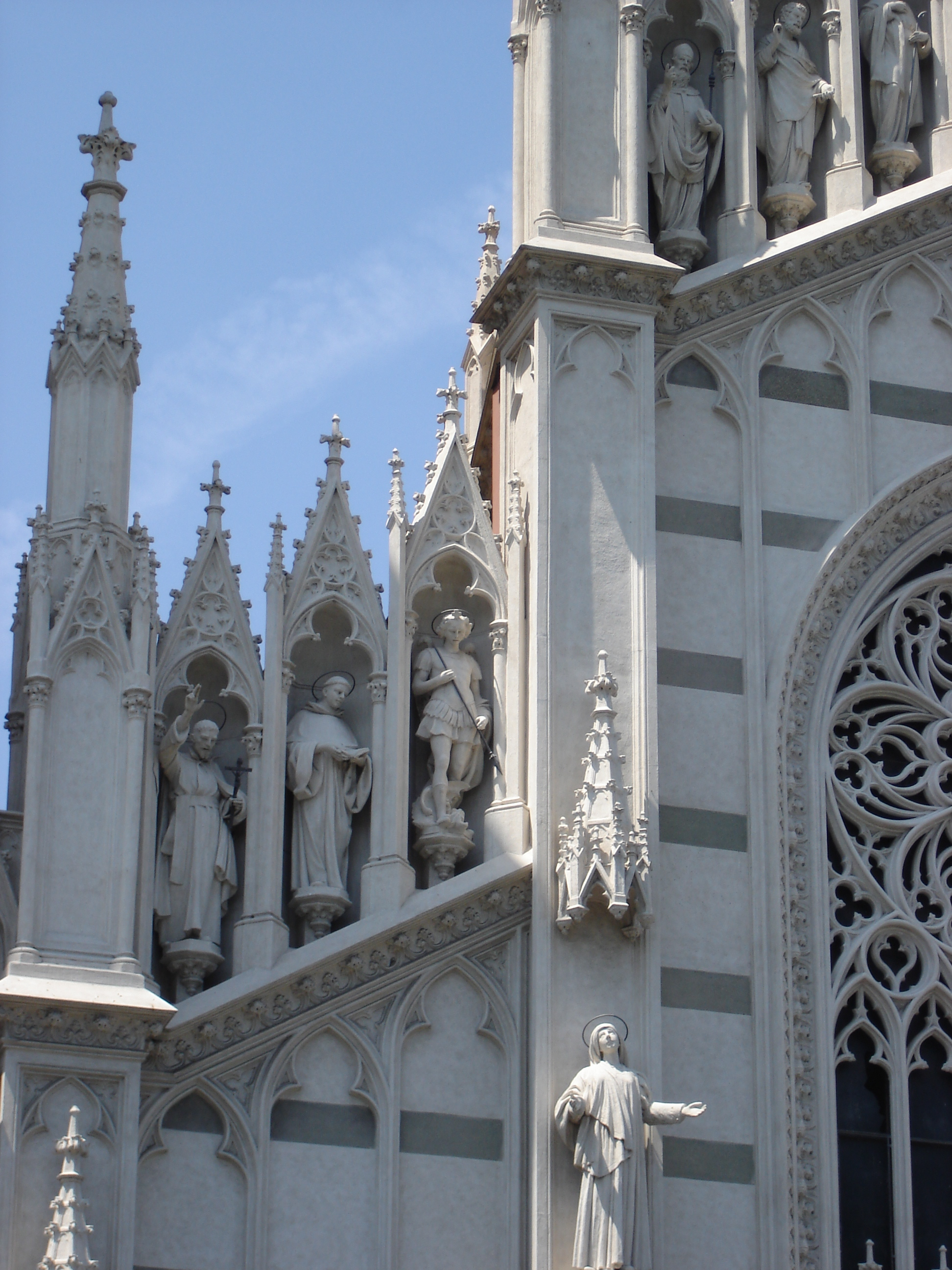
A detail of the façade

Sacro Cuore di Gesù in Prati rises in Lungotevere Prati, between Via Ulpiano and Via Paolo Mercuri, close to the Palace of Justice.

The façade with salients, entirely made with reinforced concrete, underlines the internal subdivision into three naves thanks to six quadrangular piers, each surmounted by a spire. In the lower part there are three portals, whose embrasure is decorated by little columns made of red Verona marble; each portal is surmounted by a wimperg and decorated with a marble lunette hosting a bas-relief: the central lunette portrays the Souls of Purgatory, the one on the right the Deposition of Christ and the one on the left the Resurrection of Christ; the wimperg above the central portal shows a high-relief portraying the Sacred Heart of Jesus between two Angels. In correspondence to each of the side naves there is a high triphora, while the central nave corresponds to a big esaphora including a rose window showing a richly decorated trestle. The façade ends aloft with a thin octagonal bell tower: it is surmounted by a cross that hosts an earth-shaped ex-voto, donated by Victor Jouët.

The decorations of the façade, formerly made with artificial stone, has been replaced, starting from 1960+, by statues made with St. Gotthard stone, though identical to the original ones. They include gothic-inspired architectural features and nineteen statues of saints, personally chosen by Pope Pius X; they are positioned within recesses above the slopes of the central nave (from the left: St. Augustine, St. Peter Apostle, St. Joseph, Our Lady of the Sacred Heart, St. John Evangelist, St. Paul Apostle and St. Odo of Cluny), of the nave on the right (from the left: St. Victor, St. Francis of Assisi and St. Nicholas of Tolentino), of the nave on the left (from the left: St. Francis Xavier, St. Dominic of Guzmán and St. Michael Archangel) and close to the six pillars, placed on shelves (from the left: St. Bernard of Clairvaux, St. Gregory the Great, St. Margaret Mary Alacoque, St. Catherine of Genoa, St. Anthony of Padua and St. Patrick.

=== Interior ===
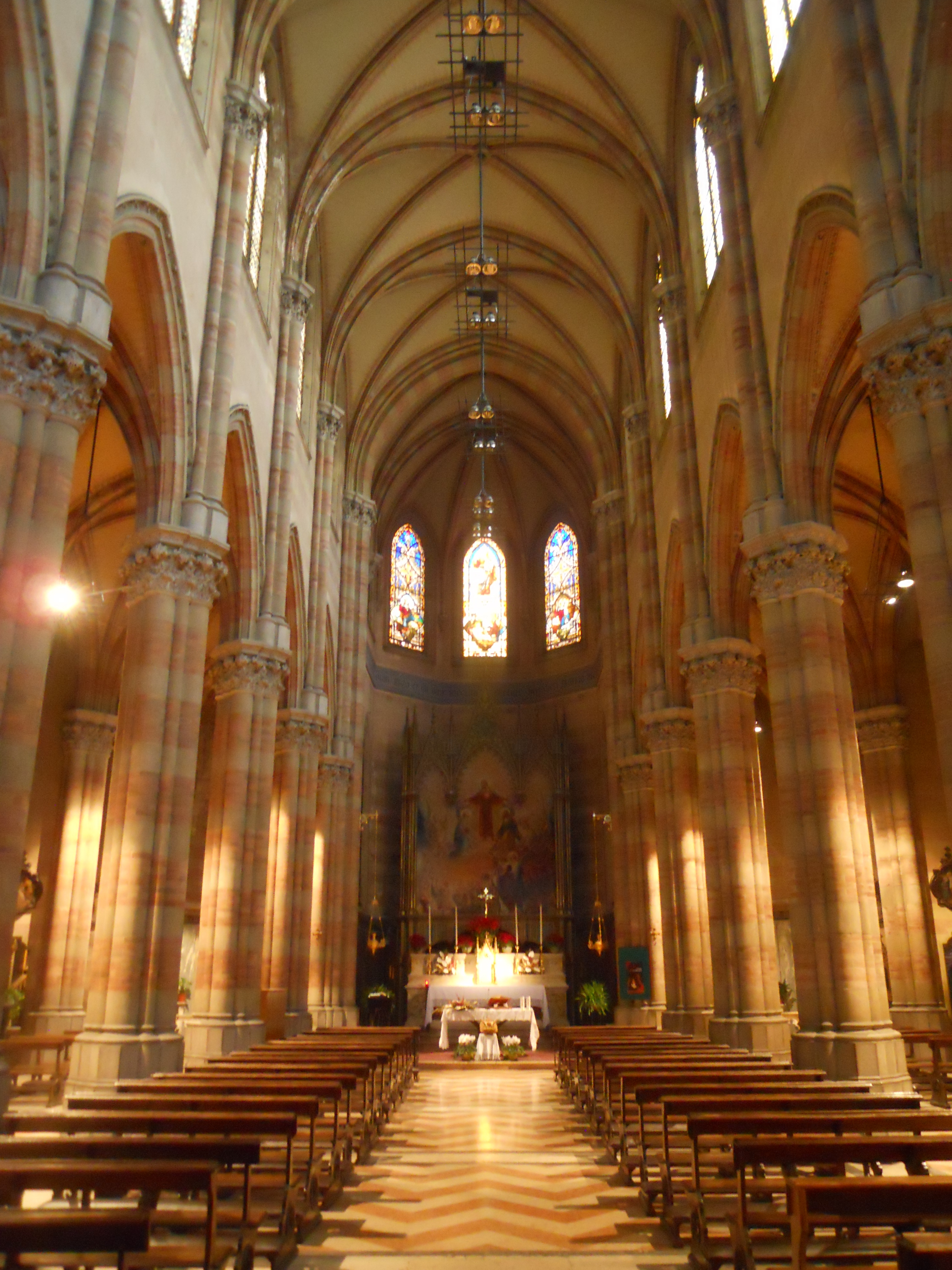
Interior

The interior of the church, slightly rotated in respect with the axis of the façade, has three naves with six bays each, covered with a groin vault and divided by pointed arches which rest on polystyle pillars with carved capitals; the pillars and the ribs of the vaults are decorated with stripes of gray stone and red bricks, while the floor shows inserts of red Verona marble. The external light enters from the three windows of the façade, as well as from eighteen biphoras with stained glass windows; the ones in the nave on the right show, starting from the entrance, St. Frances of Rome and St. Catherine of Genoa, St. Bridget and St. Ambrose, St. Bonaventure and St. Thomas Aquinas, St. Ephrem and St. Peter Damian, St. Joan of Arc and St. Sebastian, St. Robert Bellarmine and St. Francis of Sales.

Along the two side naves, in correspondence of each span, there is a barely deep, rectangular chapel; the second and fourth chapel of each side host a marble altar, while the other ones show fine wooden neo-gothic confessionals.

The first altar on the right is dedicated to St. Michael Archangel and is surmounted by an altar piece by Alessandro Catani portraying the Saint; the predella shows seven musician Angels, painted by the daughters of the artist. The following altar is dedicated to St. Margaret Mary Alacoque and is surmounted by a triptych by Giovan Battista Conti portraying the Vision of the Heart of Jesus to Margaret Maria Alacoque (1923), while the predella shows, from the left, St. Jeanne-Françoise Frémiot de Chantal, St. Margaret Maria Alacoque surrounded by the souls of the Purgatory, St. Margaret Maria Alacoque shows to the novices the worship of the Sacred Heart of Jesus and St. Francis of Sales.

The first altar on the left is dedicated to St. Anthony of Padua: the altar piece, by Giuseppe Burgo, portrays St. Anthony as the saint of charity and rests on a predella showing, from the left, St. Gerolamo Emiliani, St. Vincent de Paul, St. Camillus de Lellis, Jesus the Saviour parting the bread, Blessed Anna Maria Taigi, St. Elizabeth of Hungary and St. Louise de Marillac. The following altar is dedicated to St. Gregory the Great and is surmounted by an altar piece inspired to the legend of the monk Justus: it shows St. Gregory the Great celebrating mass for the soul of the monk Justus and, above it, the Blessed Spirit and, on the top of the frame, the sculpture God the Father; the predella shows, from the left, St. Michael Archangel, St. Gregory the Great and poor people, St. Gregory the Great dictates the Gregorian chant and St. Gabriel Archangel; the work is by Giovan Battista Conti.

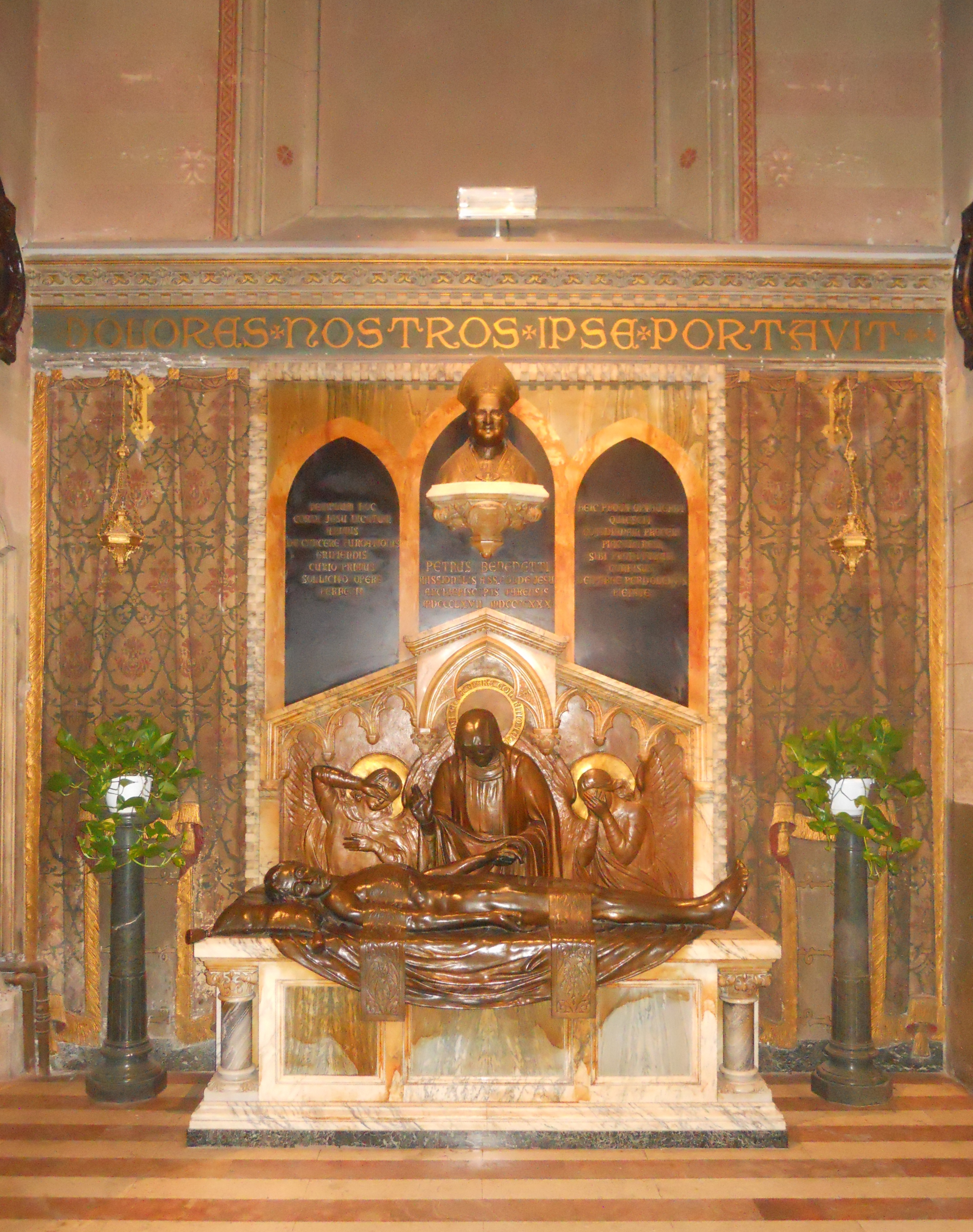
Funeral monument of Monsignor Pietro Benedetti

In the last span of the side nave on the left, placed against the wall, rises the Funeral monument to Monsignor Pietro Benedetti (1932), made with polychrome marbles, completed by a bronze "Piety" in the lower part and a bronze bust of the same Bishop in the higher.

Both side naves end with a polygonal chapel, which contains a marble altar whose slab rests on little columns and closed by a balustrade decorated with trilobate arches. The chapel in the nave on the right is dedicated to St. Joseph and corresponds to the second oratory of the Association of the Sacred Heart of the Suffrage of the Purgatory Souls; its altar is surmounted by an altar piece by Giuseppe Brugo portraying St. Joseph with Jesus as a child between two angels, St. Teresa and St. Bernard. The chapel on the opposite side is dedicated to Our Lady of the Rosary and the altar is surmounted by the altar piece by Francesco Notari Our Lady of the Rosary between angels, St. Dominic of Guzmán and St. Catherine of Siena; the frame is decorated with God the Father (in the middle) and the Annunciation (on both sides), while the painted predella shows on the left St. Zita, St. Agnes and St. Cecilia, on the right St. Alphonsus Maria de' Liguori, St. Bernardino of Siena and St. Cyril of Alexandria; the tabernacle is decorated with the Sacred Heart of Jesus. The frame was designed by Notari and manufactured by carpenter Giuseppe Fallaci, wood carver Arturo Grossi and gilder Giovacchino Corsi.

The central nave ends with a deep polygonal apse, enlightened by two orders of ogival windows; in the centre of the apse rises the marble high altar, decorated with gilded bronzes and surmounted by the tabernacle Behind the altar there is the altar piece The Sacred Heart and the Souls of Purgatory, by Giuseppe and Alessandro Catani.

=== Pipe organ ===
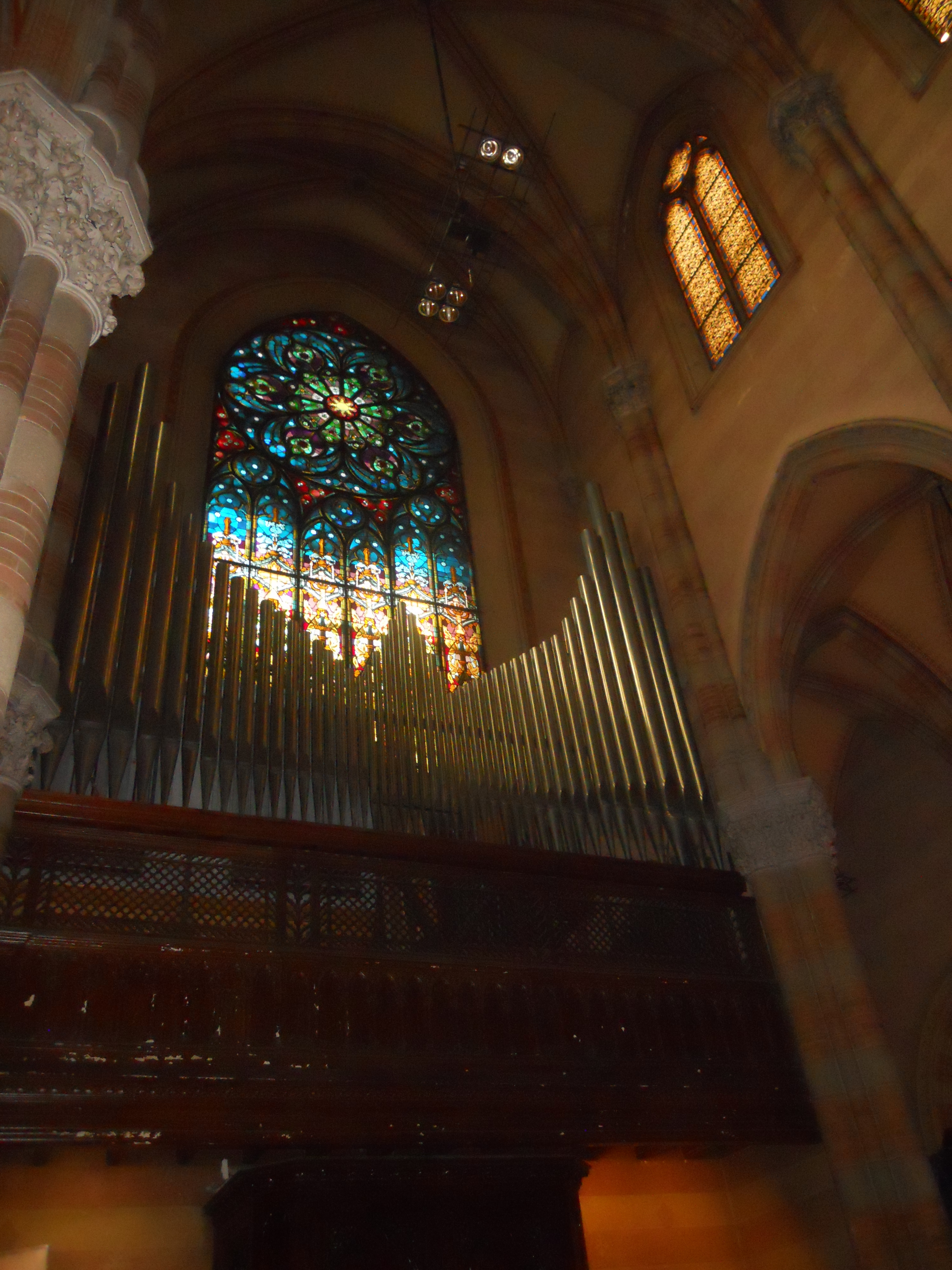
The organ in the counter-façade

Close to the counter-façade, above a wooden cantoria whose bulwark is decorated with a series of ogival arches, rises the pipe organ, built by Fabbrica Organi Ruffatti after 1960+ in place of a former one, coming from the church of Santa Brigida.

=== Museo delle anime del Purgatorio ===
Next to the church, within the sacristy, is the Museo delle anime del Purgatorio ("Museum of the Souls of Purgatory"), whose entry is a door in the sixth span of the nave on the right.

On July 2, 1897 a miraculous occurrence happened in the Chapel of the Association of the Sacred Heart of Purgatory Souls' Suffrage, when, during a fire, the soul of a deceased appeared to the attendance and his effigy was impressed on the wall; hereafter Victor Jouët decided to search for testimonies (documents and looms) about the appearances of the souls of Purgatory and to collect them in a museum close to the church.

== Bibliography ==
- Barbieri, Patrizio; Morelli, Arnaldo (1985). "Regesto degli organi della città di Roma", in L'organo - Rivista di cultura organaria e organistica, anno XIX (1981) (PDF). Bologna: Patron.
- Tagliaferri, Alberto (1994). Rione XXII - Prati. Rome: Fratelli Palombi.
- La grande guida dei rioni di Roma: storia, segreti, monumenti, tradizioni, leggende, curiosità. Milan: Newton & Compton. 2004. ISBN 88-8289-388-X.
- Rendina, Claudio (2004). Le chiese di Roma. Milan: Newton & Compton. ISBN 88-541-0205-9.
- Abbate, Fulvio (2007). Roma: guida non conformista alla città. Rome: Cooper. ISBN 978-88-7394-062-3.
- Alemanno, Massimo (2010). Le chiese di Roma moderna, vol. II. Rome: Armando. ISBN 978-88-7394-062-3.
- Santangini, Domenico; Fioravanti, Arianna (2013). Chiesa del Sacro Cuore di Gesù in Prati e Piccolo Museo del Purgatorio. Rome: Litografia Leberit.
