= Grottarossa mummy =

2nd-century mummy of a young Roman girl

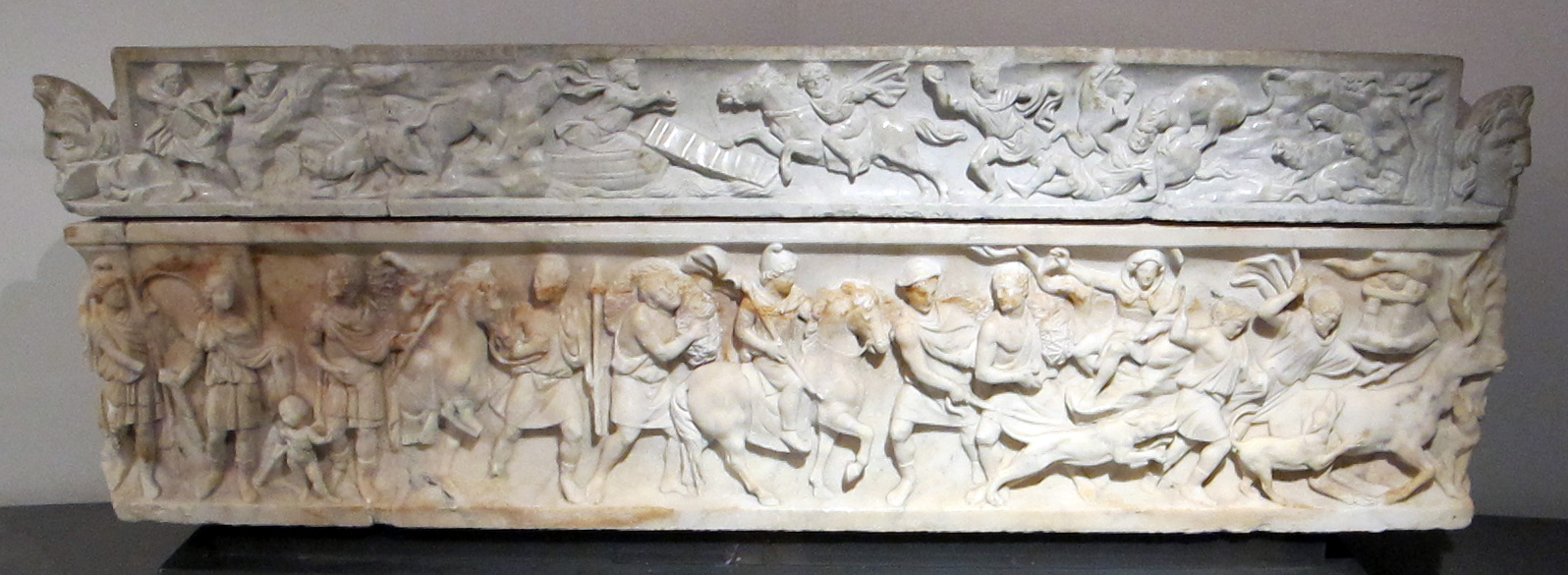
- Her marble sarcophagus at the National Roman Museum
- Died: Second century CE (aged approximately 8)
- Cause of death: Probably pleurisy, possibly resulting from pneumonia
- Resting place: National Roman Museum of Palazzo Massimo, Rome, Italy
- Known for: Mummy of a young Roman girl embalmed in Egyptian style and buried with gold jewellery and an articulated ivory doll

The Grottarossa mummy is the preserved body of a young Roman girl who lived during the second century AD. Her burial was discovered in 1964 in the Grottarossa district of Rome. She was entombed within a white marble sarcophagus decorated with scenes referencing the Aeneid. The tomb was protected from ancient robbery by a large amount of building material, possibly from a funerary monument; her identity is unknown.

The girl died at around eight years-old of pleurisy. Study of her bones revealed she had been ill frequently prior to her death. She was buried wearing gold jewellery set with sapphires from Sri Lanka, and an articulated doll made of ivory. Her body was embalmed and wrapped in linen fabric bandages in Egyptian style. At the time of discovery, her body was perfectly preserved; exposure to the air resulted in rapid dehydration and discolouration of the skin. Her burial is housed in the National Roman Museum of Palazzo Massimo.

== Discovery ==
The Grottarossa mummy was discovered on 5 February 1964 during construction work at the intersection of the Via Cassia and the Via di Grottarossa in the district of Grottarossa, on the northern edge of Rome. The sarcophagus was uncovered by a bulldozer and loaded onto a truck along with the spoil to be removed from the site. The truck driver alerted the police, who contacted the archaeological service. The body was sent to the Sapienza University of Rome.

Excavations carried out after her discovery found her sarcophagus was placed in a narrow cut 5.3 metres (17 ft) below the modern ground level. The shaft was closed with a plug of cement. Above was an area of ancient building debris, possibly from a funerary monument of which nothing has survived.

Based on the style of her burial, she is thought to have lived late in the reign of Hadrian (died 138) or under the Antonine emperors (160-180 AD).

== Sarcophagus ==
The sarcophagus is of white Carrara marble and measures 1.74 by 0.58 by 0.52 metres (5.7 ft × 1.9 ft × 1.7 ft). It was broken into seven pieces during discovery.

The surface is covered in elaborately carved scenes. The lid is vaulted, with raised long edges, one of which is missing. The surviving side shows a lion-hunting scene. One horseman flees with a stolen cub while its mother looks on unable to help, representing the forceful separation of parent and child and the emotional impact of the loss. The corners are decorated with masks.

The front long side is carved with Aeneas and Dido's hunt in the Aeneid by Virgil. Dido, at the far left, is depicted as the goddess Diana; Aeneas is beside her, separated by a cupid. Aeneas as a representation of Rome was a popular figure on sarcophagi of individuals who lived in Roman provinces. This may support the idea that the girl and her family lived outside of Italy and her body was returned for burial. In the centre of the scene is Aeneas' son Ascanius riding a horse. He, as a mythological future leader, may suggest ongoing life. There is a boar-hunting scene on the adjoining short right side. The short left side depicts the personified Africa and River Bagradas along with the goddess Venus.

== Mummy ==
The preserved body of the girl is 120 centimetres (47 in) long. In her mummified state she weighs only 4,960 grams (10.93 lb). She had short (3–5 centimetres (1.2–2.0 in)) black hair. Based on her skull shape, she is suggested to have come from central or northern Italy. At the time of discovery, her body had a life-like appearance but quickly dehydrated and discoloured, probably due to exposure to air.

Her body was treated with plant resins, largely derived from pine and including aromatics such as myrrh; products derived from juniper may have been introduced to the body. No natron, the salt used in Egyptian mummification, is present. Her organs are preserved but show signs of decomposition. Small textile fragments stuck to the resin indicate she wore a silk tunic with contrasting band(s) (clavi). Her body was then wrapped in linen bandages, which survived on her upper arms. As the linen is of Italian manufacture, her mummification is thought to have been carried out in Rome. Her Egyptian-style treatment is suggested to be the result of either her family living in Egypt for some period, or them worshiping Egyptian deities.

X-ray examination of her teeth and bones, combined with her height, estimate she was eight years-old at death. Lines of arrested growth (Harris lines) and generally low bone density (osteoporosis) indicate periods of malnutrition, presumably caused by illness. Her cause of death was determined to be most likely pleurisy, possibly as a result of pneumonia. The suggested causes of her malnutrition are tuberculosis or diabetes, the latter of which would make her more susceptible to further illnesses.

She was buried wearing several items of jewellery. She wore gold hoop earrings, and a gold necklace with sapphires. Chemical analysis identified the stones as originating from Sri Lanka. She wore a single gold ring with a figure of winged Victory; the hoop of the ring was wound with thread to make it smaller to fit securely on her finger.

== Burial goods ==
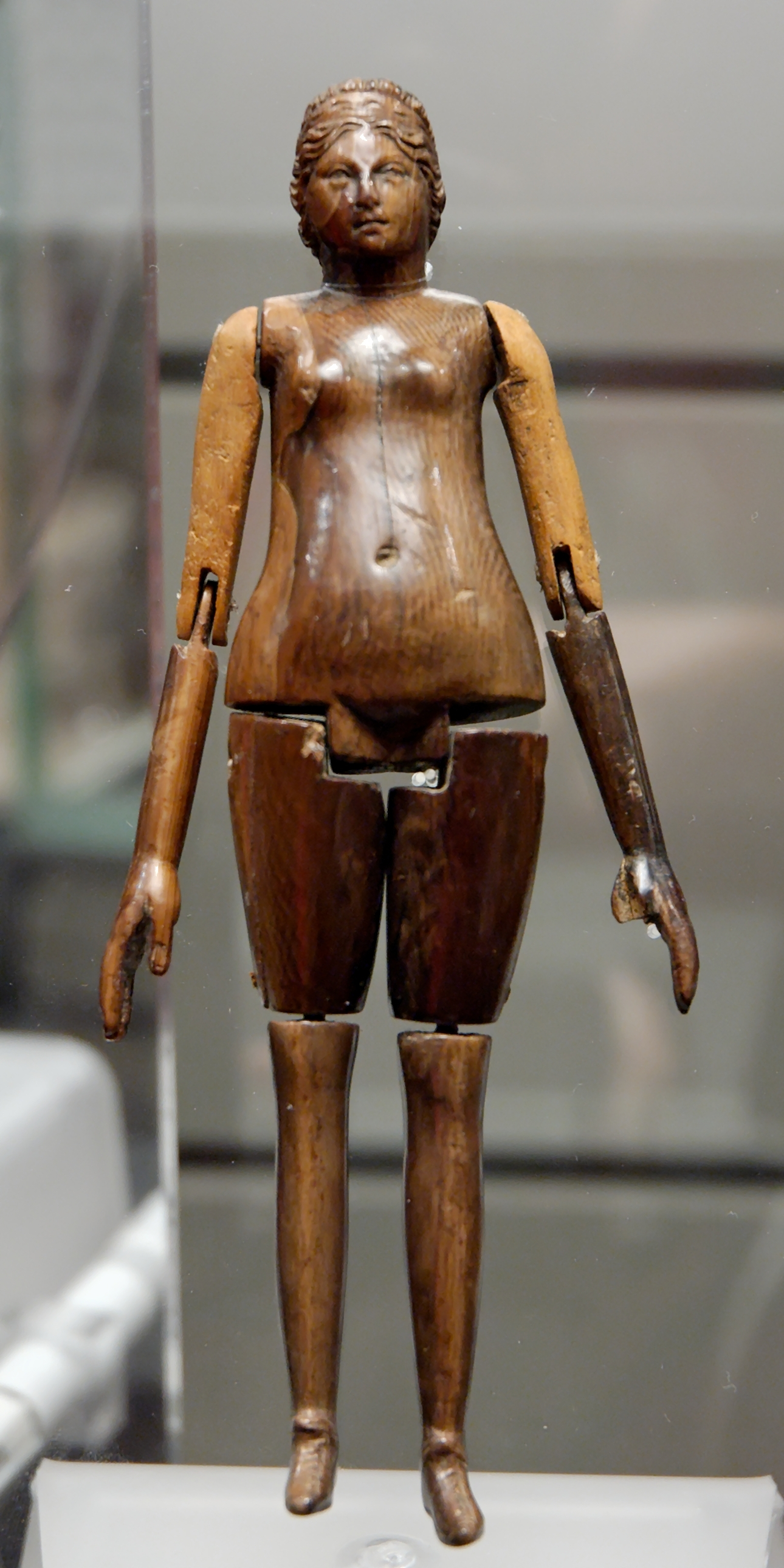
Articulated ivory doll

A 16.5 centimetres (6.5 in) tall ivory doll with articulated limbs was placed in the sarcophagus. The upper arms were lost during discovery, and the thumb was broken from the left hand. Her hairstyle is a low bun, similar to the hairstyle of Faustina the Younger, wife of Marcus Aurelius, which supports a date of the 150s-160s.

Other small objects were made of amber: a small container in the shape of a shell; a oval vase; a miniature pot; a lidded scoop with handle. Inside the wrappings were further amber objects consisting of a die, a wedge, a pine nut; and a small female bust.

== See also ==
- Crepereia Tryphaena - a young Roman woman who lived around the same time and was buried in similarly elaborate style, discovered in 1889
