= Crepereia gens =

Roman family

The gens Crepereia was a plebeian family of equestrian rank at ancient Rome. The family appears in history from the first century BC to the first or second century AD. Cicero describes the strict discipline of the Crepereii.

== Origin ==
"If a man's nomen is uncommon enough," write Barbara Levick and Shelagh Jameson, "it can reveal something of the origin and history of his family." The gentilicium Crepereius is uncommon, attested only in Italy and certain portions of the Roman Empire, becoming relatively common only in North Africa.

Varro states that the word creper is Sabine, which provides a likely origin for this family. One branch of this gens during the first century BC proceeded east to the Greek-speaking provinces where they prospered as negotiatores; inscriptions bearing the name of this gens can be found at Attaleia and Pisidian Antioch. On the other hand, the Crepereii attested in North Africa, who number about 50, are explained as descendants of one or more recruits who served in the Legio III Augusta during the first or second century AD.

== Branches and cognomina ==
Among those cognomina appearing in history are Rocus, from raucus, "hoarse, shouting, raucous", and Gallus, a common surname with two ambivalent derivations: from gallus, a cockerel, belonging to a common class of surnames derived from the names of familiar objects and animals; or Gallus, a Gaul, frequently applied to persons of Gallic descent, appearance, or habits.

== Members ==
This list includes abbreviated praenomina. For an explanation of this practice, see filiation.

- Marcus Crepereius was one of the judges in the case of Verres. However, he was designated one of the military tribunes for 69 BC, and was therefore unable to take part in the trial after the first of January that year.
- Quintus Crepereius M. f. Rocus, perhaps the son or brother of the judex Marcus Crepereius, minted several coins depicting Venus and Neptune, the gods of Corinth, from which it may be inferred that he had some connection with that city, perhaps after its restoration by Caesar.
- Crepereius Gallus, a friend of Agrippina, who perished in the ship that was sunk with the intention of causing Agrippina's death. He might be the same Gaius Crepereius Gallus mentioned as a procurator in an inscription from Antioch in Galatia.
- Crepereius Calpurnianus, a native of Pompeiopolis, wrote a history of the wars between Rome and Parthia, which has been lost.
- Lucius Crepereius Euhodus, a freedman buried at Rome in the latter part of the second century, along with Crepereia Tryphaena. Their tomb was found near the Palace of Justice in 1889.
- Crepereia Tryphaena, a freedwoman buried at Rome in the latter part of the second century, along with Lucius Crepereius Euhodus.
- Crepereius Proculus.
- Lucius Crepereius Rogatus signo Secundinus, a Roman senator and a pagan, from around the late third or early fourth century.
- Crepereius Amantius, a vir clarissimus probably from around the mid-fourth century, and possibly ordinary consul in 345.
- Crepereius Donatianus, addressee of a law of Constantine I, dated 13 December 319.
- Lucius Crepereius Madalianus, suffect consul probably by 335, and proconsul of Africa after 341.
- Crepereius Optatianus, legatus Karthaginis in 361.

== See also ==
- List of Roman gentes

== Bibliography ==
- Marcus Terentius Varro, De Lingua Latina (On the Latin Language).
- Marcus Tullius Cicero, In Verrem.
- Publius Cornelius Tacitus, Annales.
- Lucian, Quomodo Historia Conscribenda Sit (How to Write History).
- Andreas Morell, Thesaurus Morellianus, Siwart Haverkamp et al. (eds.), Jacob Wetstein, Amsterdam (1734–1752).
- Dictionary of Greek and Roman Biography and Mythology, William Smith, ed., Little, Brown and Company, Boston (1849).
- Theodor Mommsen et alii, Corpus Inscriptionum Latinarum (The Body of Latin Inscriptions, abbreviated CIL), Berlin-Brandenburgische Akademie der Wissenschaften (1853–present).
- René Cagnat et alii, L'Année épigraphique (The Year in Epigraphy, abbreviated AE), Presses Universitaires de France (1888–present).
- George Davis Chase, "The Origin of Roman Praenomina", in Harvard Studies in Classical Philology, vol. VIII, pp. 103–184 (1897).
- Barbara Levick and Shelagh Jameson, "C. Crepereius Gallus and His Gens", in Journal of Roman Studies, vol. 54, pp. 98–106 (1964).
- Martindale, John R.; Jones, A. H. M.; Morris, John, eds. (1971). The Prosopography of the Later Roman Empire: Volume I, AD 260–395. Cambridge: Cambridge University Press. ISBN 0-521-07233-6.
- John C. Traupman, The New College Latin & English Dictionary, Bantam Books, New York (1995).
