= Giovanni Battista Milani =

Italian architect and engineer (1876–1940)

- Born: 17 May 1876; Rome, Kingdom of Italy
- Died: 26 June 1940 (aged 64); Rome, Kingdom of Italy
- Occupation(s): Architect, engineer

Giovanni Battista Milani (17 May 1876 – 26 June 1940) was an Italian architect and engineer.

== Life and career ==
After graduating in engineering in Rome in 1899, Milani began his career working with the engineer and architect Guglielmo Calderini before establishing his own professional practice. In 1905, he succeeded Enrico Guy as full professor of technical architecture at the Royal School of Engineering in Rome. Together with Gustavo Giovannoni, he was one of the founders of the School of Architecture in 1920.

Among his works in Rome are the church of San Lorenzo da Brindisi on Via Sicilia (1910); the apartment buildings for the Istituto Romano di Beni Stabili on Viale Mazzini and the Villino Campos in Piazza d'Armi (1911); the Palazzo Coen and other projects for prominent Jewish families; the expansion of the School of Engineering in the former convent of San Pietro in Vincoli (1916–1920); and the "Roma" seaside resort in Ostia (1924, later destroyed by Nazis during World War II). Outside Rome, he most notably designed the headquarters of the Banca Popolare Cosentina in Cosenza (1926), the psychiatric hospital in Rieti (1930), and Villa Milani in Spoleto, purchased and renovated between 1920 and 1927 as his summer residence.

Milani was also a member of the Accademia di San Luca, the Accademia Raffaello of Urbino, and the Academy of Fine Arts of Perugia.

== Sources ==
- Capanna, Alessandra (2010). "MILANI, Giovanni Battista". Dizionario Biografico degli Italiani. Vol. 74. Istituto dell'Enciclopedia Italiana.
- De Guttry, Irene (1989). Guida di Roma moderna dal 1870 ad oggi. Rome: De Luca. p. 132.
- Mazza, Alessandro (1996). Giovanni Battista Milani. Progetti e architetture romane 1900-1940. Rome.
- Sgarbi, Vittorio (1991). Dizionario dei monumenti italiani e dei loro autori. Roma dal Rinascimento ai giorni nostri. Milan: Bompiani. p. 168.
