= Museo delle anime del Purgatorio =

Italian religious museum

Museum of the Souls of Purgatory
- Museo delle Anime del Purgatorio
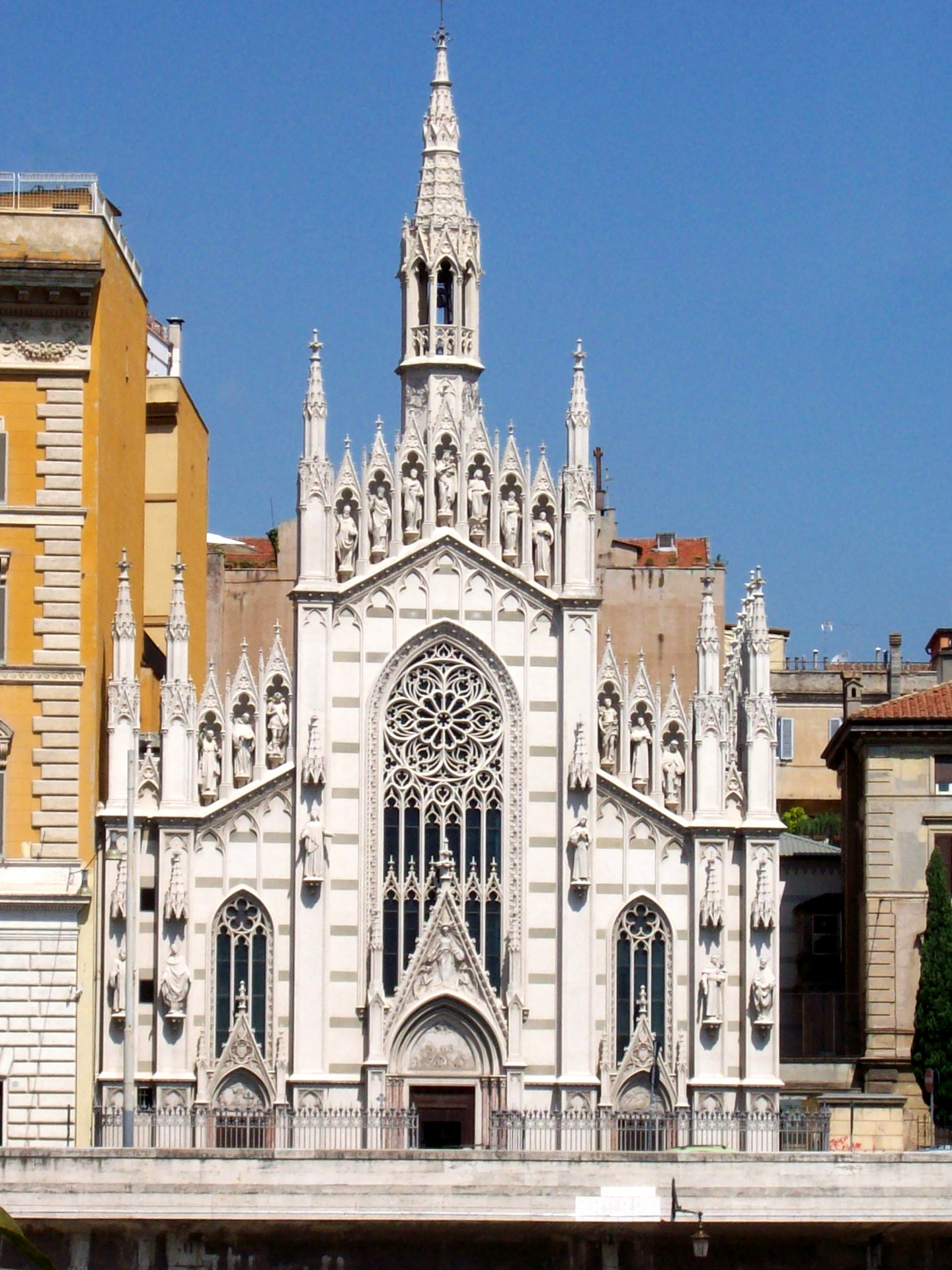
- Click on the map for a fullscreen view
- Established: after 1917
- Location: Rome, 12 Lungotevere Prati
- Coordinates: 41°54′15.08″N 12°28′20.37″E

The Museo delle Anime del Purgatorio (Italian for Museum of the Souls of Purgatory) is a museum of Rome (Italy), in 12 Lungotevere Prati, within the vestry of the Chiesa del Sacro Cuore del Suffragio.

== History ==
In 1897 a fire burned a chapel of the Chiesa del Sacro Cuore del Suffragio. The priest Victor Jouët saw on the wall behind the altar the image of a human face bearing a sad and melancholy expression, impressed by the flames. He believed that the soul of a deceased man, condemned to Purgatory, had tried to get in contact with living people.

This specific occurrence brought to the foundation of the museum. Victor Jouët decided to find other documents and statements about similar facts. The research proved to be more difficult than expected, nevertheless he searched out many materials, showing the following: the deceased people, compelled to pass a period in the afterlife reign of Purgatory in order to purify from their sins, tried to catch the attention of the people still alive, so as to ask them for prayers and suffrage masses and so facilitating their transition to Paradise.

== Collection ==
The collection of the museum is gathered into a single room of the vestry in the Chiesa del Sacro Cuore del Suffragio.

A single showcase contains about ten documents and photos, including:

- the imprint of three fingers left in 1871 on the prayers book of Maria Zaganti by deceased Palmira Rastelli;
- the photograph of an imprint impressed by deceased Mrs Leleux on the sleeve of his son Giuseppe during its appearance in 1789 in Wodecq, Belgium;
- the fire imprint left by a finger of Sister Maria di San Luigi Gonzaga, which appeared to Sister Maria del Sacro Cuore in 1894;
- the imprint on a book of Marguerite Demmerlé, in the Parish of Ellinghen, left by her mother-in-law in 1815, 30 years after her death.

== Bibliography ==
- Staccioli, Paola (June 1996). "Museo del purgatorio". I musei nascosti di Roma. Rome: Newton Compton Editori. pp. 52–53. ISBN 88-8183-417-0.
- Lavatelli, Ginevra (2004). Roma insolita e segreta. Tours: Edizioni Jonglez. p. 44. ISBN 2-915807-02-7.

| Preceded by Museo Civico di Zoologia | Landmarks of Rome; Museo delle anime del Purgatorio | Succeeded by Museo delle Mura |
