= Lungotevere Prati =

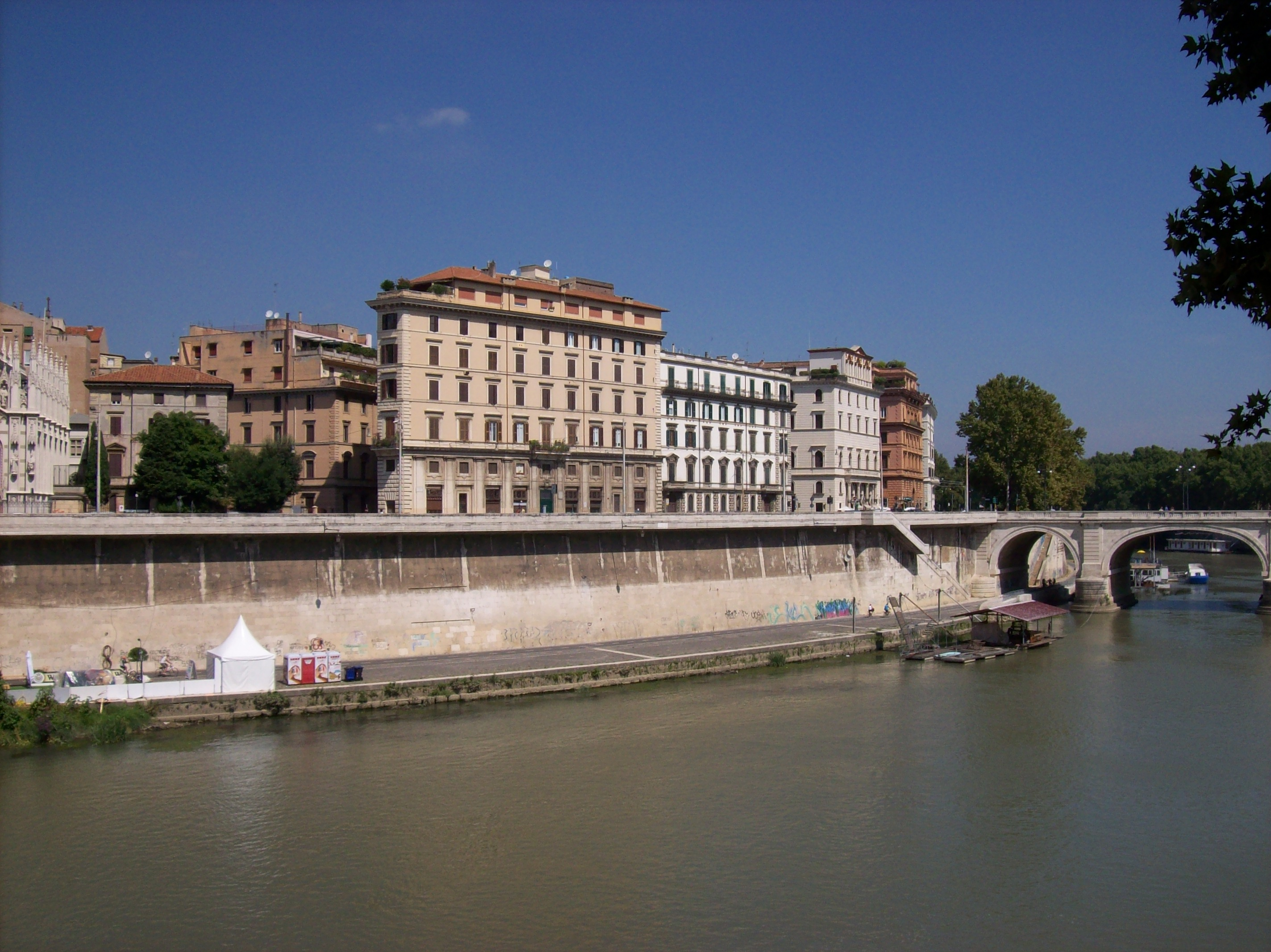
- Lungotevere Prati seen from the opposite bank of the Tiber
- Interactive map of Lungotevere Prati
- Namesake: Prati (from Latin prata)
- Location: Rome, Italy
- Quarter: Prati
- From: Via Ulpiano
- To: Via Vittoria Colonna

Lungotevere Prati is the stretch of Lungotevere that links Via Ulpiano to Via Vittoria Colonna in the rione Prati in Rome (Italy).

== Overview ==
The Lungotevere takes its name from the neighboring area, formerly called prata (Latin for "meadows") due to the presence of large green spaces mainly inhabited by peasants; it was established as per resolution dated July 20, 1887.

Along the Lungotevere rises the Neo-Gothic Chiesa del Sacro Cuore del Suffragio, built by Giuseppe Gualandi between 1894 and 1917.

== Bibliography ==
- Rendina, Claudio; Paradisi, Donatella (2004). Le strade di Roma. Volume terzo P-Z. Rome: Newton Compton Editori. ISBN 88-541-0210-5.
