= Museo Civico di Zoologia =

Museum in Rome, Italy

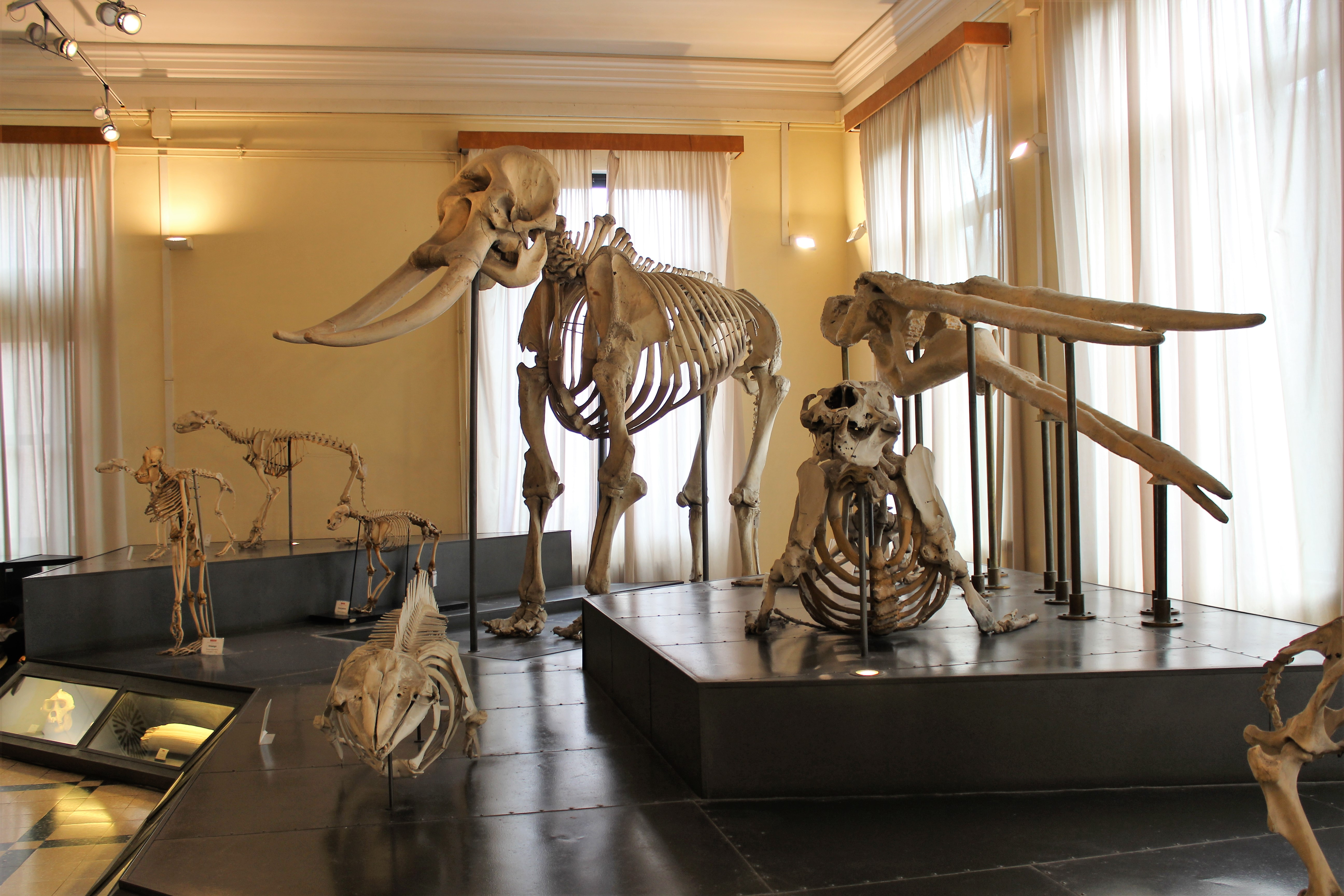
- Osteology Gallery in the Museo Civico di Zoologia
- Click on the map for a fullscreen view
- Established: 1932
- Location: Via Ulisse Aldrovandi, 18 Rome, Italy
- Coordinates: 41°55′09″N 12°29′18″E
- Website: www.museiincomuneroma.it

The Museo Civico di Zoologia is a natural history museum in Rome, central Italy. It is situated next to the Bioparc (Zoo) and can be entered by the Zoo or through the entrance on via Ulisse Aldrovandi. Founded in 1932, it is said to continue the natural history tradition of the Gabinetto di Zoologia dell'Università Pontificia and the collections date from 1792.

== Importance ==
It is recognized as an institute of national importance by the Ministero per la Università e la Ricerca Scientifica. There are collections of entomology, malacology, osteology, ornithology, herpetology, ichthyology and mammalogy. There are five million specimens in total( molluscs, insects, birds and mammals and fossils). The displays are modern, with over 1000 square metres of multi-sensorial or interactive stations exhibitions and three-dimensional reconstructions. A biodiversity display includes sections on the significance of sex in the animal world; adaptations in borderline environments and ecosystems. other displays are more traditional with two ornithology halls a gallery on "Arrigoni degli Oddi" and two halls of mammals.

The museum contains the zoological collections of Conte Arrigoni degli Oddi.

== Convention ==
The museum is the result of a convention made between the municipality of Rome and the Sapienza University of Rome . It is one of three centres, second in the university, conserves specimens of invertebrates and vertebrates including fish, amphibians and small mammals. It is at Museo di Zoologia, Università degli Studi di Roma "La Sapienza, Viale dell'Università 32, 00100 Roma. The third, at Via Catone, contains entomological collections retained by the university.

Preceded by Museo di Scultura Antica Giovanni Barracco	Landmarks of Rome; Museo Civico di Zoologia	Succeeded by Museo delle anime del Purgatorio
