= Crepereia Tryphaena =

Roman woman

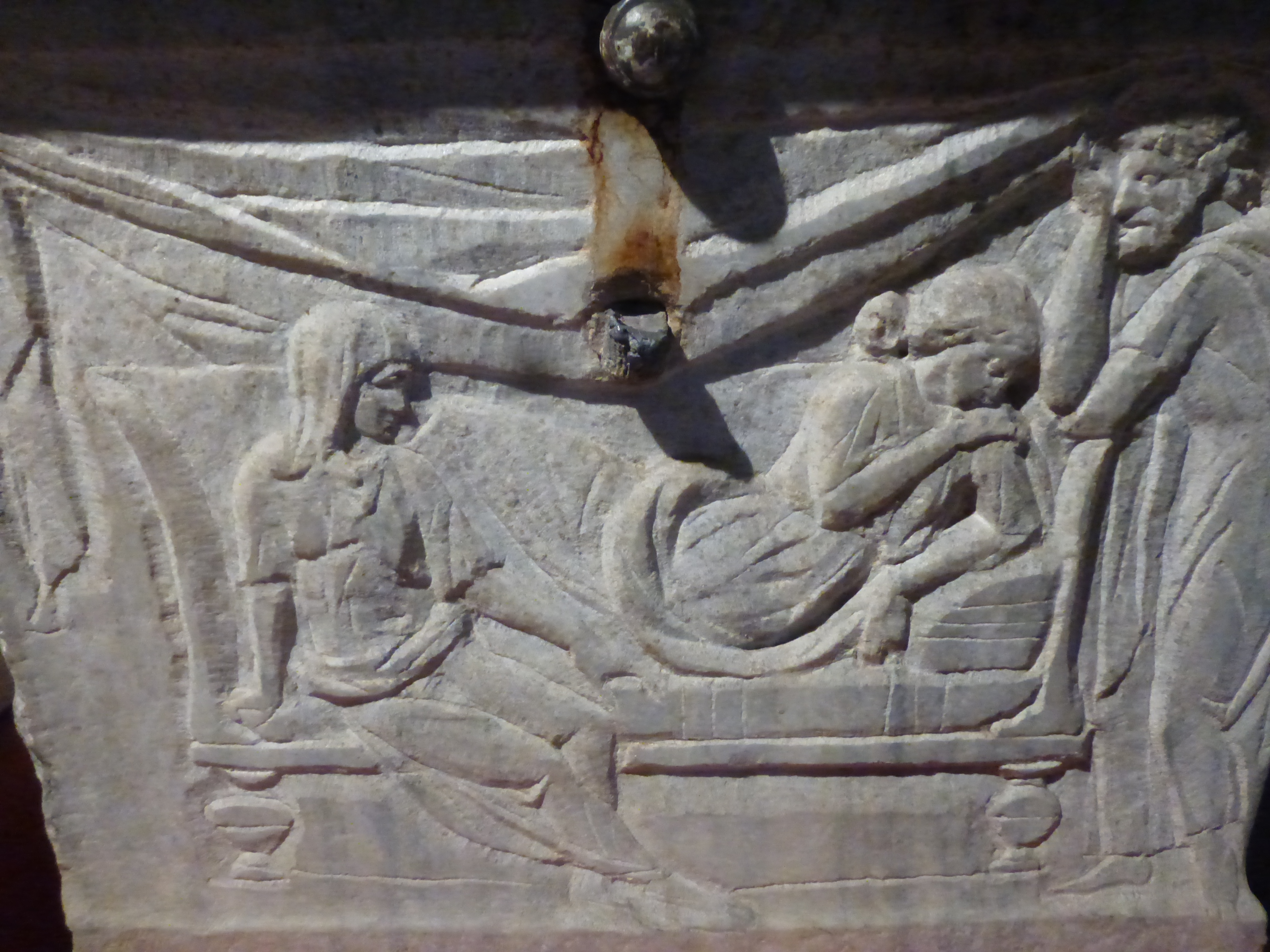
The sarcophagus of Tryphaena

Crepereia Tryphaena was a young Roman woman, presumably about 20 years old, whose sarcophagus was found during the excavation works started in 1889 for the foundations of the Palace of Justice and for the construction of the Umberto I bridge over the Tiber in Rome. Among the items found in her sarcophagus were pieces of a funeral outfit, including a sculpted doll.

== Discovery ==
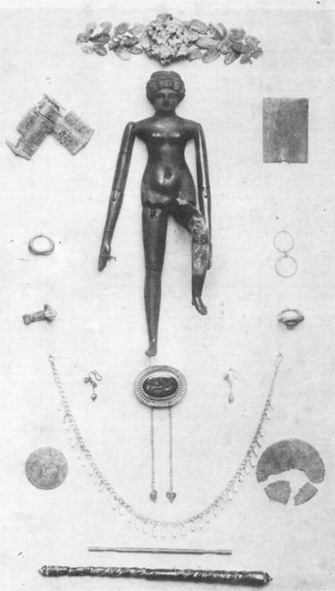
Excavation photograph of the doll's kit in Crepereia Tryphaena's sarcophagus, described by goldsmith and antiquarian Augusto Castellani

During the excavation, several archaeological finds came to light, including a group of five sarcophagi buried between the middle of the 2nd and the 3rd centuries AD; of these, two still sealed were named after members from the same family: Crepereia Tryphaena and Crepereius Euhodus. The two sarcophagi had been buried at the bottom of a well later filled with earth, and they were placed side by side and decorated only on two sides, as if they had been tombe bisome or double burial.

On the marble case of the sarcophagus dedicated to Crepereia Tryphaena was engraved a scene with a deep bas relief alluding to the girl's death. She is depicted as dormant on the funeral bed, with the head resting on her left shoulder. On the bed's side, near her feet, a veiled matrona is seated, staring at the deceased. At the bedside, a virile figure wearing a chlamys is posed in deep pain.

The funeral equipment, present only in the Tryphaena sarcophagus, included many gold ornaments; moreover, placed next to her skeleton there was an ivory doll, initially believed to be made of oak wood, of fine workmanship and with hinged limbs. To the Romans who on the morning of 12 January 1889 learned about this exceptional discovery near the Umberto I bridge, she resembled a river divinity. When the sarcophagus, which was still sealed, was opened, the young woman, submerged in the water coming from the nearby Tiber river, appeared as a nymph. Archaeologist Rodolfo Lanciani, present at the excavations, wrote:

Removing the lid, and glancing at the corpse through the crystal of the clear and fresh water, we were strangely surprised by the appearance of the skull, which still appeared to be covered by her thick and long hair waving on the water. The fame of such an admirable discovery quickly attracted crowds of onlookers from the nearby neighborhood, so that the exhumation of Crepereia Tryphaena was accomplished with most solemn honors, and the memory of it will remain long years in the Prati district. The hair phenomenon is easily explained: through the filtering water, bulbs of an aquatic plant that produced very long ebony filaments had penetrated the hollow of the sarcophagus, and these bulbs had preferably placed their barbicines on the skull. The skull was slightly turned towards the left shoulder and towards the kind doll figure ...

The intact skeleton of the girl, which at the moment of her death was about 20 years old, was still adorned with several jewels and a crown of myrtle leaves blocked by a barrette made with small silver flowers. At the time of her burial, Crepereia wore gold and pearl pendant earrings and a gold necklace with pendants formed by small beryl crystals. Her tunica was held by a gold brooch adorned with an engraved amethyst bezel.

Among Tryphaena's jewels, a ring was found on the finger of the young girl engraved with the word "Filetus"; this made poet Giovanni Pascoli imagine that it was the name of her missing promised spouse. The presence of the doll in the funeral outfit may suggest that she died on the eve of her wedding, not having had time to donate her toys to the gods in the "farewell to childhood" ceremony. Pascoli composed a poem in Latin which he presented on the occasion of the wedding of the daughter of the honourable Benzoni, at that time minister of public education and his friend and protegee in Rome:

Vitrea virgo sub aqua latebas
at comans summis adiantus undis
nabat. An nocti dederas opacae
spargere crinis?

Translation:

You hid, girl, in the transparent water,
and your fern hair swam on the wave.
Had you conceded to the dark night
the privilege of dissolving them?

=== Tryphaena's doll ===
The doll, 23 cm tall, is not a common toy but rather a "prestigious" object, a work of art, with a finely sculpted face, almost as if it were a portrait.

The technical skill of the craftsman who created it also stands out in the body with movable joints; legs and arms are connected to the trunk with small pins. This type of joint allows only anatomically correct movements to the limbs, and denotes an extremely high level of craftsmanship. It is possible that the doll had been designed to wear clothes, since - unlike its trunk - its hands, feet and head have been carved with extremely high detail. Archaeologist and Haaretz writer Terry Madenholm, wrote:

Although Crepereia’s doll isn’t portrayed as pregnant, the doll's rounded childbearing belly and the wide life-giving hips were to "prepare" Crepereia for the most valued role that a woman could have in the ancient world: that of being a mom. Not just any mom, but a respected mother: the doll’s elaborately carved hairstyle is an elegant reproduction of the one popularized by the fashion icon Faustina the Younger.

Near the doll were discovered the remains of an ivory casket also originally believed to be wood. Remounted over a perspex structure, it belonged to the doll's kit. On one of its thumbs, the doll had a key ring inserted of the type used by the Romans for jewelry boxes. Other toys found in the sarcophagus and part of the doll's kit were two silver mirrors and two tiny bone combs. The above-mentioned gold ring of the key type, another with a bezel, two tiny pierced pearls, part of earrings, a pearl and two glass paste beads, plus remains of golden spirals belonging possibly to a necklace were also part of the doll's kit.

== Origin of the family ==
Tryphaena has been identified as a girl who lived in the mid-2nd century AD. The terminus post quem for the burial can be obtained through the doll's hairstyle, coiffed according to a composite Roman fashion hairstyle with elements of the times of empress Faustina Major (r. 138–40) (complex joining on the nape of small braids gathering on the top of the head) and those of emperor Marcus Aurelius (r. 161–180) and empress Faustina Minor (r. 161–75) (parted hair on the forehead descending with swollen and soft undulations framing the face and partially covering the ears). A more precise dating for the death of the girl can be deduced by the style of the bas-relief carved on the short side of her sarcophagus, typical of the coloristic style of Roman sculpture in the years around 170.

The names of the deceased suggest a Greek origin of the family; it is unclear whether they were themselves liberti (freed slaves) or descendants of liberti. A connection with the imperial house seems plausible, since the parcel where the tomb was found – part of the Horti Domitiae in the Ager Vaticanus – had belonged to the imperial treasury since Nero's time. It is noteworthy that according to the epigraphic sources during the 2nd century AD several members of the gens Crepereia - to whom these liberti belonged - were active in the eastern part of the Roman Empire.

== Exhibition ==
After the discovery, the two sarcophagi of Tryphaena and Euhodus were exhibited until 1928 in the room named "dei sarcofagi" in the Museum of the Palazzo dei Conservatori, part of the Capitoline Museums. In 1929 they were moved to the newly created Antiquarium Comunale on the Caelian Hill; the two sarcophagi were exhibited without the covers, allowing visitors to see the skeletons and the objects of the Crepereia furnishings arranged "in the same way as they had been placed at the beginning".

In 1939, after the eviction and partial collapse of the Antiquarium, the two sarcophagi and the trousseau returned to the deposits of the Capitoline Museums and were exhibited only on special occasions; the jewels in Turin in 1961 on the occasion of the great exhibition on "Gold and silver of ancient Italy" for the hundredth anniversary of Italy's unity, and the whole outfit in an exhibition at Palazzo Caffarelli from 1967 to 1971. This was the first time when the funeral outfit was studied as a whole. The two sarcophagi with the outfit, together with the doll and its kit are now permanently displayed at the Centrale Montemartini museum (part of the Capitoline Museums) at the via Ostiense in Rome.

== Sources ==
- Lanciani, R. (1889). "Delle scoperte avvenute nei disterri del nuovo Palazzo di Giustizia". Bullettino della Commissione Archeologica Comunale di Roma. 3 (in Italian). Roma: Tip. della R. Accademia dei Lincei: 173–178, Plate VIII.
- Castellani, A. (1889). "Descrizione degli oggetti trovati nel sarcofago di Crepereja Trifena". Bullettino della Commissione Archeologica Comunale di Roma. 3 (in Italian). Roma: Tip. della R. Accademia dei Lincei: 178–180.
- Dolansky, Fanny (October 2012). "Playing with Gender: Girls, Dolls, and Adult Ideals in the Roman World". Classical Antiquity. 32 (2): 256–292. doi:10.1525/CA.2012.31.2.256.
- Sommella, Anna Mura; Talamo, Emilia, eds. (1983). Crepereia Tryphaena: un tesoro nascosto di 2000 anni fa Tesori nascosti (in Italian). Torino: Fabbri.
- Salza, Eugenia; Ricotti, Prina (1995). Giochi e giocattoli. Vita e costumi dei romani antichi (in Italian). Firenze: Quasar. ISBN 978-88-7097-084-5.
- Fittà, Marco (1997). Giochi e giocattoli nell'antichità (in Italian). Firenze: Leonardo Arte. ISBN 978-88-7813-641-0.
