= Guglielmo Calderini =

Italian architect (1837–1916)

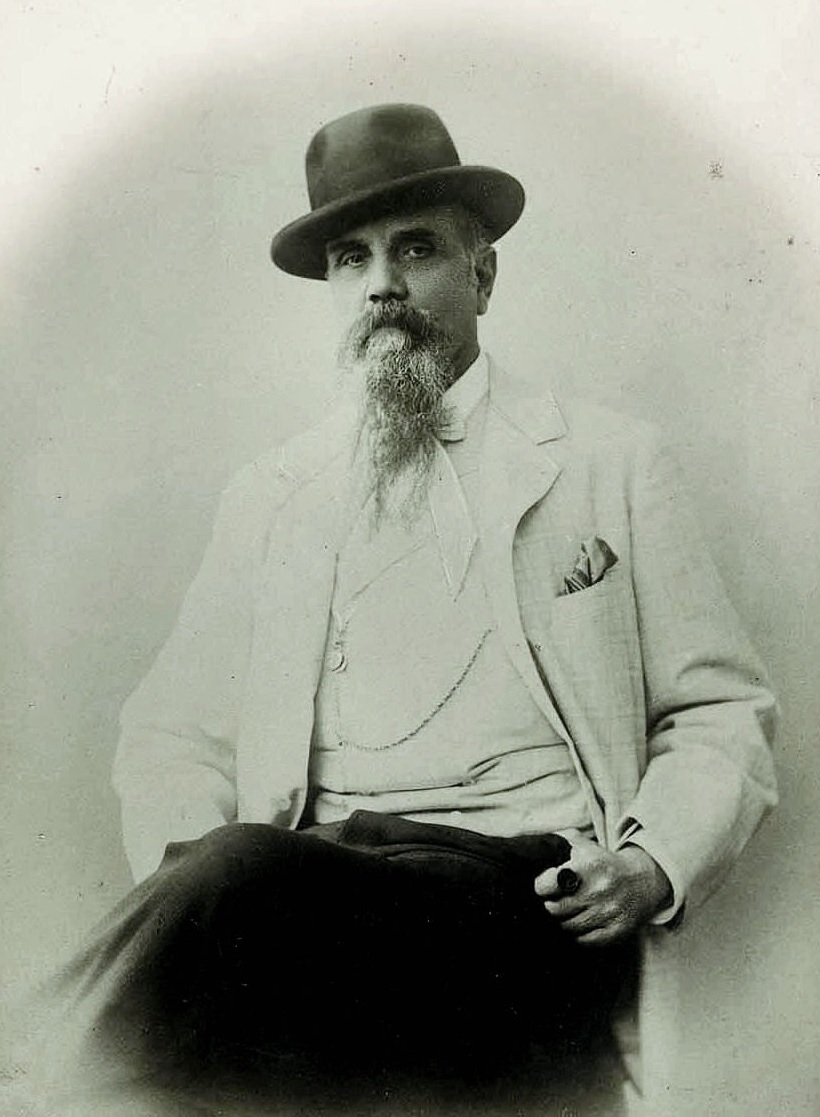
- Born: 3 March 1837; Perugia, Papal States
- Died: 12 February 1916 (aged 78); Rome, Kingdom of Italy
- Occupation(s): Architect, urban planner

Guglielmo Calderini (3 March 1837 – 12 February 1916) was an Italian architect and academic active between the late 19th and early 20th centuries.

== Life and career ==
Graduated in Rome, Calderini began his career at the Civil Engineering Office in Perugia before turning to teaching and academic architectural practice.

He took part in numerous national competitions, adopting an eclectic and classicist style. His major works include the façade of the Savona Cathedral (1879–86), the reconstruction of the portico of the Basilica of Saint Paul Outside the Walls in Rome, and above all the Palace of Justice in Rome (1888–1910), his most renowned project.

Calderini was also active in urban planning, drafting proposals for Rome (Piazza Colonna, Prati di Castello, Montecitorio) and Perugia (Monteluce Hospital, Palazzo Cesaroni). He taught at the Academy of Fine Arts in Perugia, the University of Pisa, and the University of Rome, and served as director of the Regional Office for the Conservation of Monuments, overseeing restorations such as the cloisters of the Archbasilica of Saint John Lateran and Saint Paul Outside the Walls.

== Sources ==
- Fedora Boco, ed. (1995). Guglielmo Calderini dai disegni dell'Accademia di belle arti di Perugia: un architetto nell'Italia in costruzione. Perugia: Accademia di belle arti.
- Giovanni Battista Milani, ed. (1918). Le opere architettoniche di Guglielmo Calderini. Milan: Bestetti e Tumminelli.
- Raffo Pani, Silvana (1973). "CALDERINI, Guglielmo". Dizionario Biografico degli Italiani. Vol. 16. Istituto dell'Enciclopedia Italiana.
