= Palace of Justice, Rome =

Palace of Justice
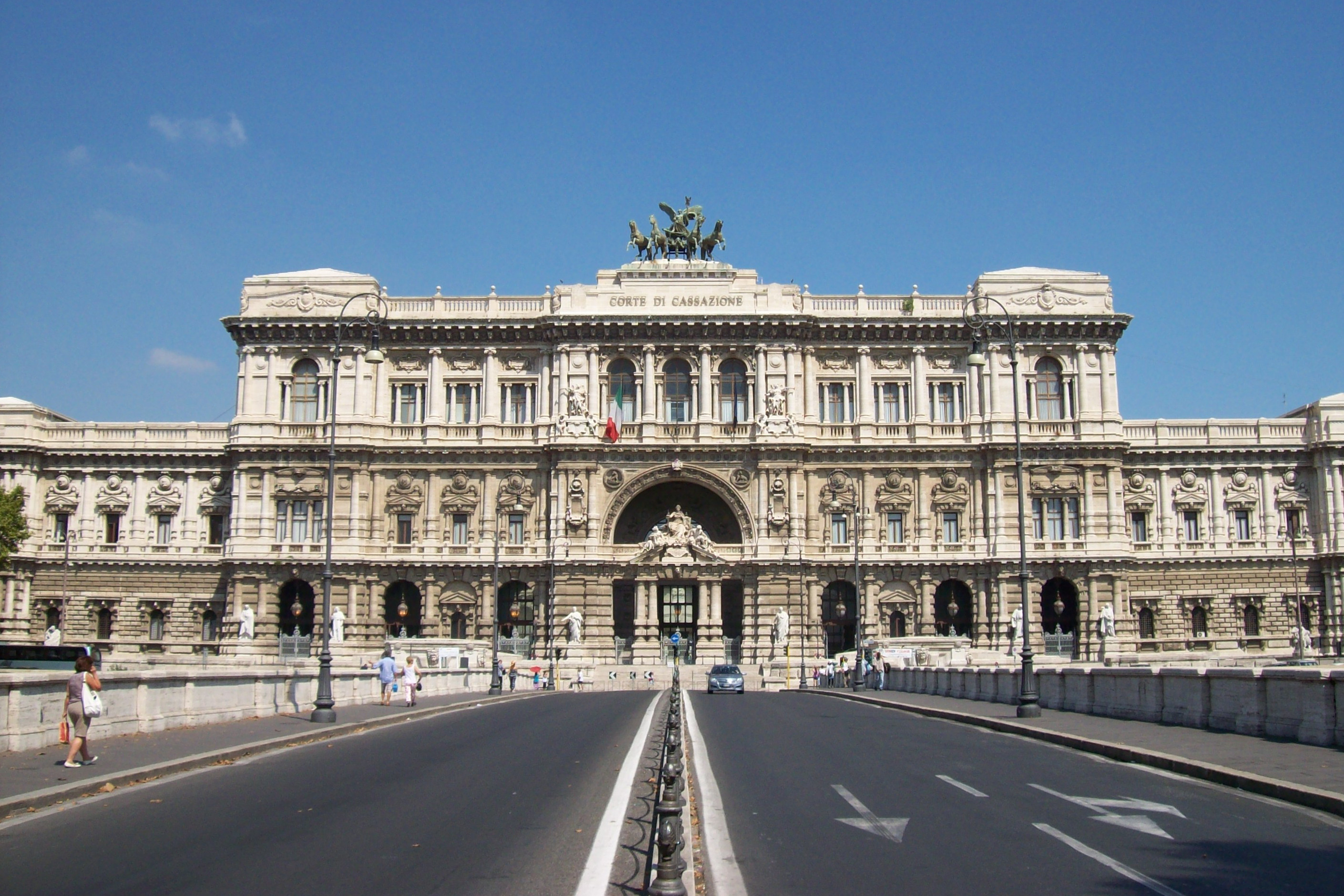
- The Palace of Justice seen from the Umberto I Bridge
- Click on the map for a fullscreen view

General information
- Location: Prati, Rome, Italy
- Coordinates: 41°54′15″N 12°28′13″E

Design and construction
- Architect: Guglielmo Calderini

The Palace of Justice (Italian: Palazzo di Giustizia), colloquially nicknamed il Palazzaccio ('the Awful Palace'), is the seat of the Supreme Court of Cassation and the Judicial Public Library of Italy. It is located in the Prati district of Rome, facing Piazza dei Tribunali, Via Triboniano, Piazza Cavour, and Via Ulpiano.

== History ==
Designed by the Perugia architect Guglielmo Calderini and built between 1888 and 1910, the Palace of Justice is considered one of the grandest of the new buildings which followed the proclamation of Rome as the capital city of the Kingdom of Italy. The foundation stone was laid on 14 March 1888 in the presence of Giuseppe Zanardelli, Minister of Justice and Keeper of the Great Seal, who had insisted on a prestigious location in the Prati district, where various other new court buildings were already going up.

The alluvial soil on which the building sits required a massive concrete platform to support the foundations. Despite this, instability problems developed after the Palace was completed, and settlement led to a need for a painstaking restoration project which was begun in 1970.

The excavations for the foundations unearthed several archaeological finds, including some sarcophagi. In one of these was found the skeleton of a young woman, Crepereia Tryphaena, together with a superbly crafted articulated ivory doll, now conserved in the Centrale Montemartini museum.

On 11 January 1911, twenty-two years after construction began, the building was officially opened in the presence of the King of Italy, Victor Emmanuel III.

The building's unusually large size, astonishing decorations, and long period of construction created the suspicion of corruption. In April 1912 a parliamentary commission was appointed to inquire into the matter and it presented its findings the following year. The affair gave rise to the building's popular and pejorative nickname of Palazzaccio.

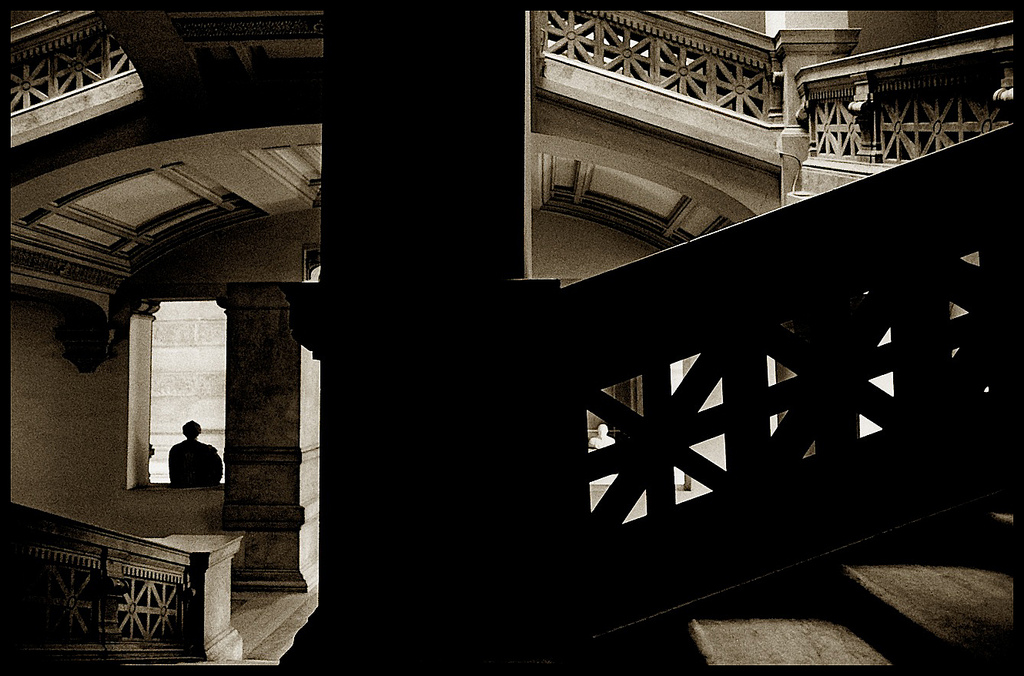

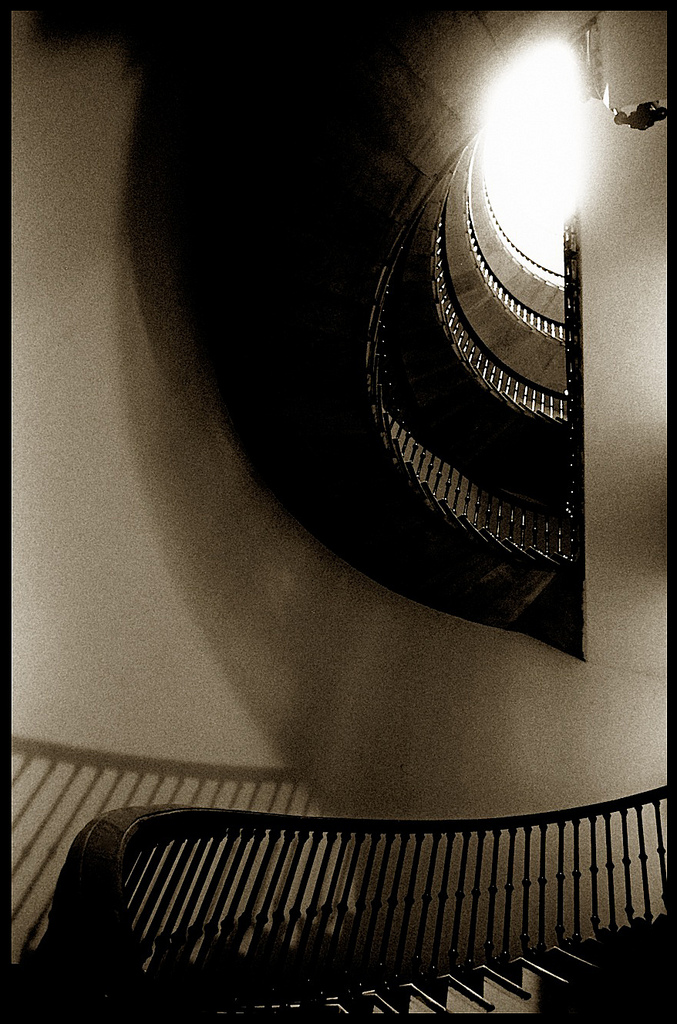

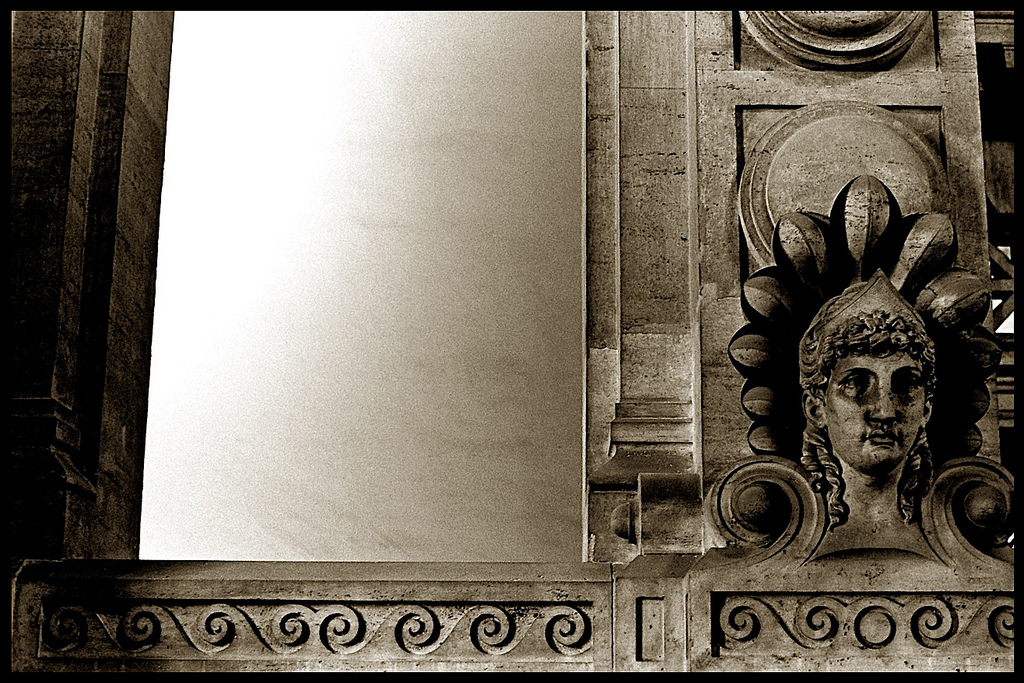

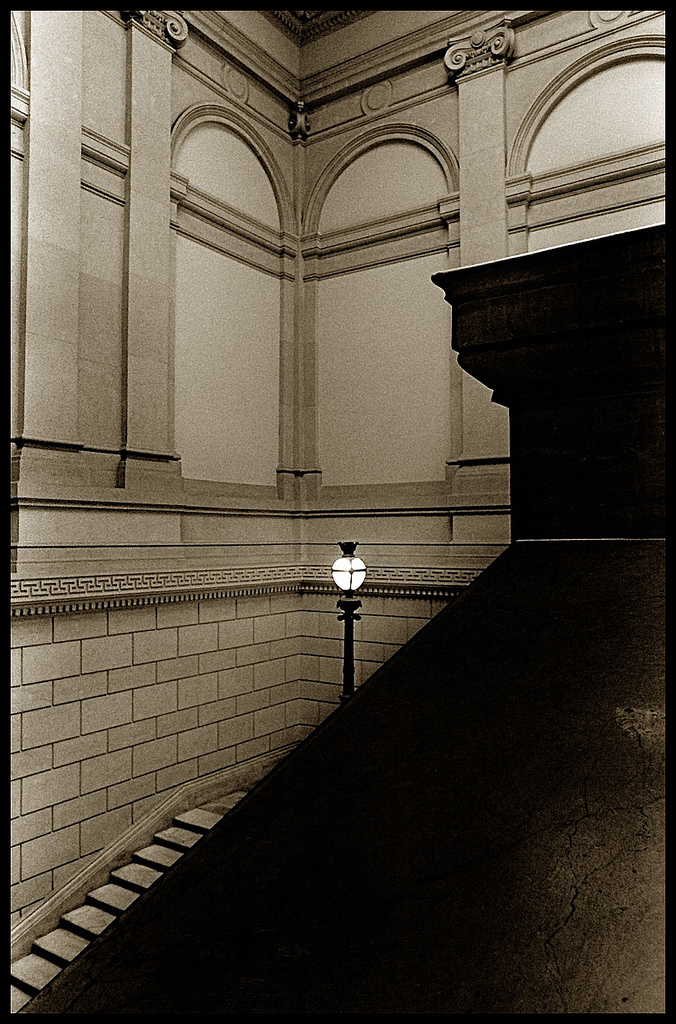

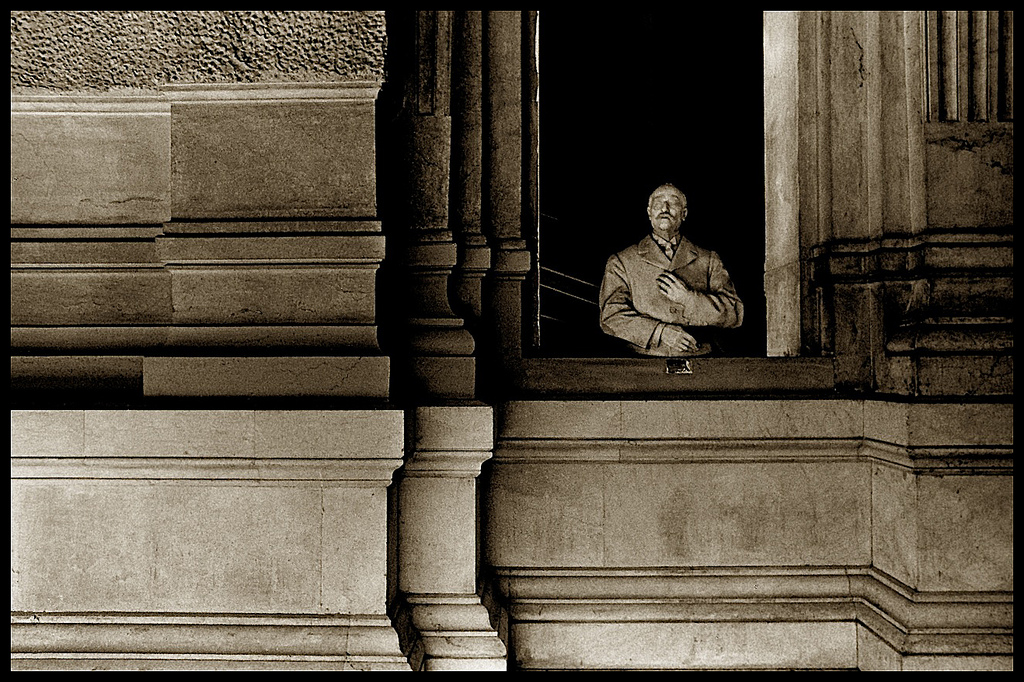

== Description ==
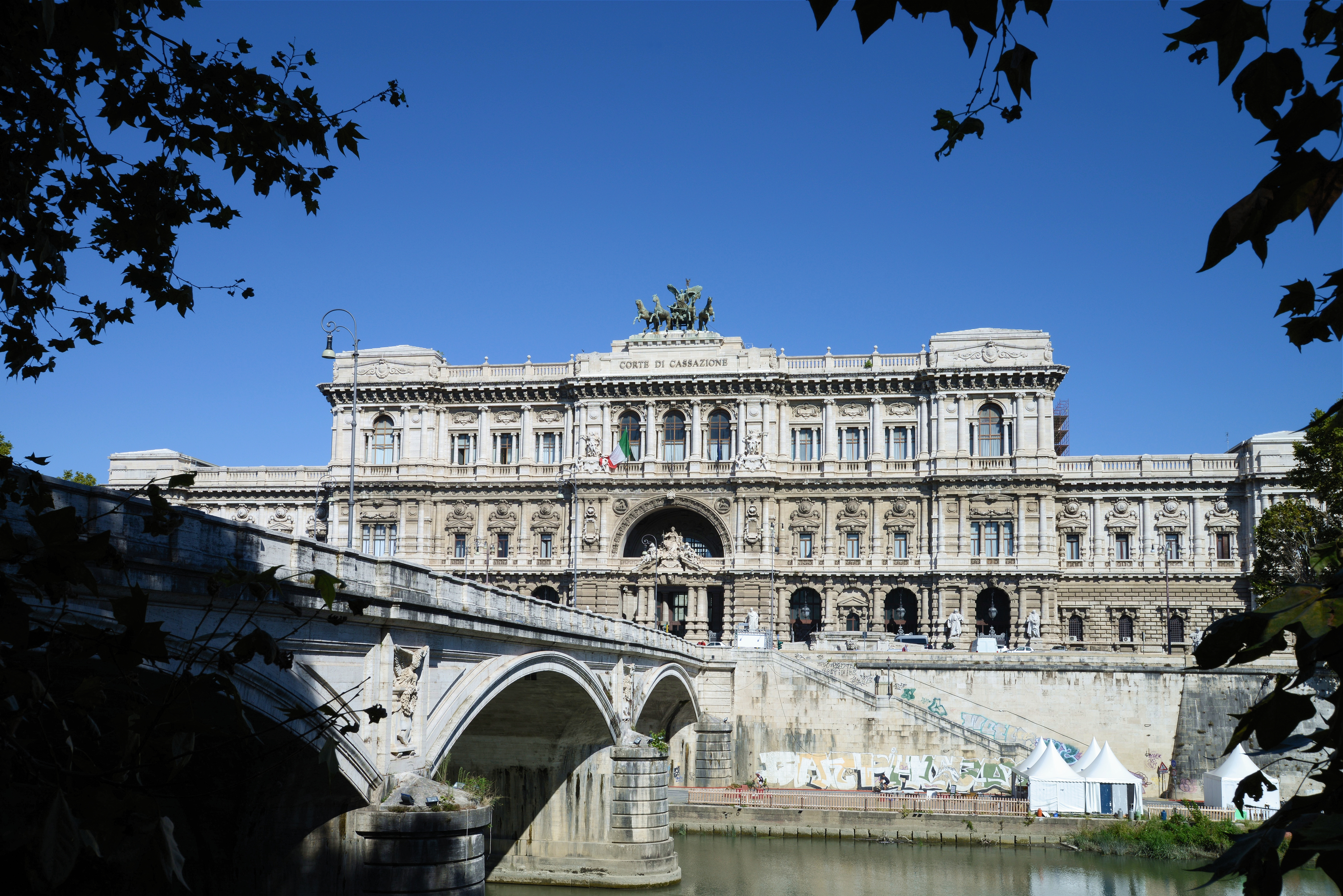
The Palace seen from the Tiber riverside

Inspired by late Renaissance and Baroque architecture, the building is 170 meters by 155 in size and is completely covered with Travertine limestone. Above the façade looking towards the River Tiber it is surmounted by a great bronze quadriga, set there in 1926, the work of the sculptor Ettore Ximenes from Palermo. Ten large statues of notable jurists adorn the ramps before the main façade, depicting (from right to left) Gaius, Herennius Modestinus, Gian Domenico Romagnosi, Bartolus de Saxoferrato, Papinian, Cicero, Giovanni Battista De Luca, Giambattista Vico, Salvius Julianus and Lucius Licinius Crassus. An additional four statues are located in the internal courtyard, showing Julius Paulus, Quintus Hortensius, Ulpian and Marcus Antistius Labeo. The upper part of the façade looking onto the Piazza Cavour is ornamented with a bronze coat of arms of the House of Savoy. Inside the Hall of the Supreme Court, also known as the Great Hall (or on Calderini's plans as the Aula Maxima) are several frescoes, begun by Cesare Maccari (1840–1919), who became paralysed in 1909 while the work was unfinished. It was continued until 1918 by Maccari's former student Paride Pascucci (1866–1954).

Preceded by Palazzo Malta	Landmarks of Rome; Palace of Justice, Rome	Succeeded by Palazzo Massimo alle Colonne
