= List of ecclesiastical basilicas in Rome =

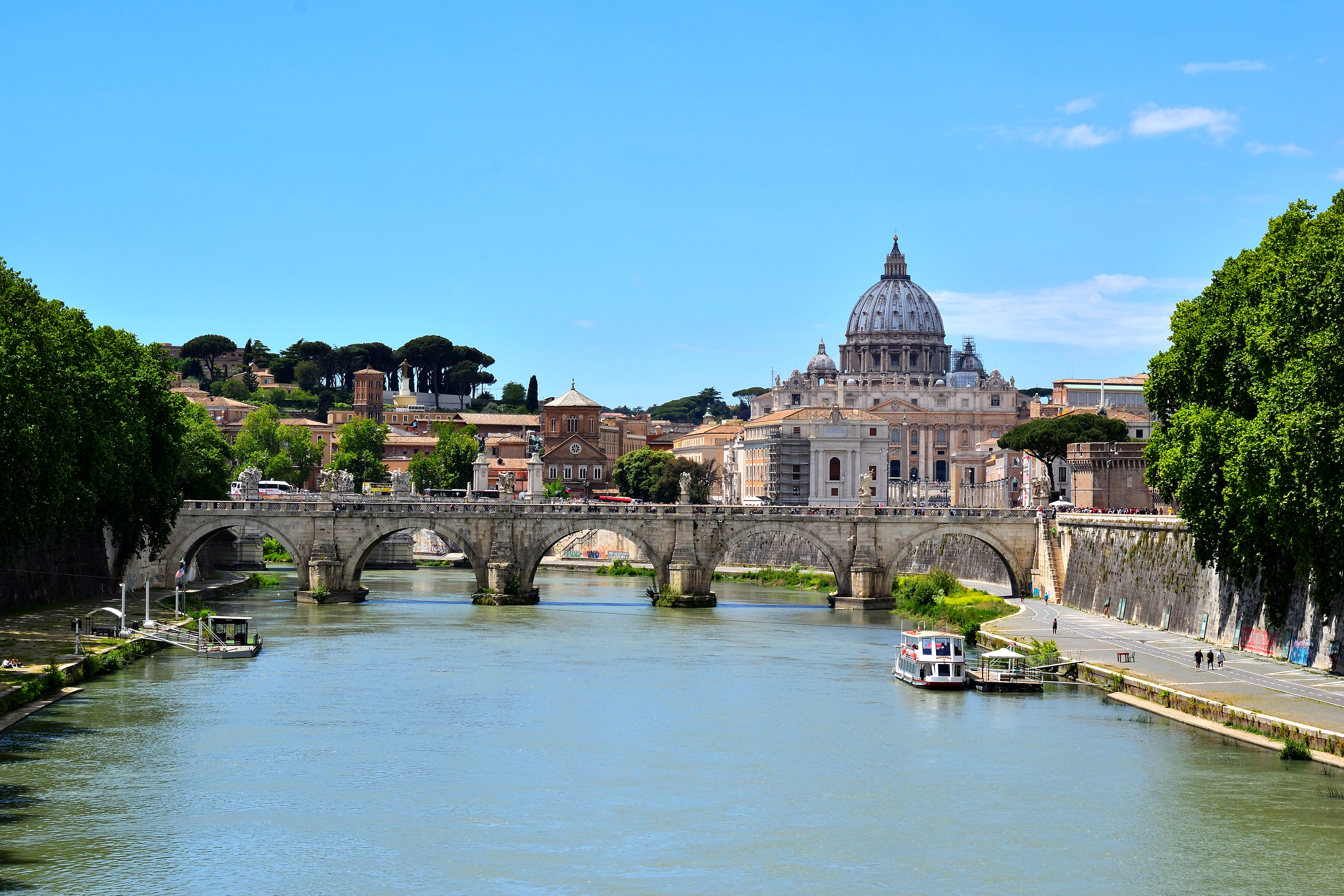
St. Peter's Basilica, viewed from the Tiber, the Vatican Hill in the back and Castel Sant'Angelo to the right, Rome. Both the basilica and the hill are part of the sovereign state of Vatican City, the Holy See of the Catholic Church.

The following is a list of Basilicas in Rome. An ecclesiastical basilica is a Roman Catholic church building which has been granted special status by the Pope. There are 66 such churches in Rome, more than any other city, (Note: The city with the next largest number after Rome is Buenos Aires, with 15 (See here)) and more than 125 of the 131 countries in the world that have basilicas. (Note: Only Germany (73), USA (74), Spain (108), Poland (125), France (169) and Italy itself (543) have more basilicas than the city of Rome. See here))

== Major Basilicas in Rome ==
There are four major basilicas of the Catholic Church: All four are in Rome, and are distinguished by their having a holy door and for being prescribed as destinations for visits as one of the conditions for gaining the Roman Jubilee. They are also signified by an Umbraculum (a baldachin resembling an umbrella, made of cloth of gold and red velvet) and a Tintinnabulum (a small bell mounted on a pole). The four are also designated Papal basilicas, so that only the Pope or his delegate may celebrate Mass at the high altar.

Basilica	Municipality	Year of creation	number (per source.)	Image
San Giovanni in Laterano	Municipio I	ancient	1	.
San Pietro in Vaticano	Vatican City	ancient	2	.
San Paolo fuori le Mura	Municipio VIII	ancient	3	.
Santa Maria Maggiore	Municipio I	ancient	4	.

== Minor papal basilicas ==
Several minor basilicas are also designated as papal basilicas; there is one such in Rome,

Basilica	Municipality	Year of creation	number (per source.)	Image
San Lorenzo fuori le Mura	Municipio II	ancient	5	.

== Minor basilicas ==
A minor basilica is a church designated as such by apostolic grant (or from immemorial custom) as an outstanding centre of pastoral and liturgical excellence. They are often also sites of pilgrimage. Minor basilicas are also marked by the tintinnabulum and umbraculum, though for a minor basilica this is of yellow and red silk.

Basilica	Municipality	Year of creation	number (per source.)
Nostra Signora di Guadalupe e San Filippo in Via Aurelia	Municipio XIII	1991	487
Sacro Cuore di Cristo Re	Municipio I	1965	393
Sacro Cuore di Gesù a Castro Pretorio	Municipio I	1921	187
Sacro Cuore Immacolato di Maria ai Parioli	Municipio II	1959	357
Sant'Agnese fuori le mura	Municipio II	ancient	12
Sant'Agostino in Campo Marzio	Municipio I	1999	521
Santi Ambrogio e Carlo al Corso	Municipio I	1929	227
Sant'Anastasia al Palatino	Municipio I	ancient	13
Sant'Andrea delle Fratte	Municipio I	1942	258
Sant'Andrea della Valle	Municipio I	1965	399
Sant'Antonio da Padova in Via Merulana	Municipio I	1931	232
Sant'Apollinare alle Terme	Municipio I	1984	466
Santi Apostoli Pietro e Paolo	Municipio IX	1967	403
Santa Balbina all'Aventino	Municipio I	ancient	14
San Bartolomeo Apostolo all'Isola	Municipio I	ancient	15
Santi Bonifacio e Alessio	Municipio I	ancient	16
San Camillo de Lellis	Municipio I	1965	392
Santa Cecilia in Trastevere	Municipio I	ancient	17
Santi Celso e Giuliano	Municipio I	ancient	18
San Clemente al Laterano	Municipio I	ancient	19
Santi Cosma e Damiano in Via Sacra	Municipio I	ancient	20
San Crisogono in Trastevere	Municipio I	ancient	21
Santa Croce in Gerusalemme	Municipio I	ancient	22
Santa Croce in Via Flaminia	Municipio II	1964	387
Santi Dodici Apostoli	Municipio I	ancient	23
San Eugenio	Municipio II	1951	306
San Eustachio	Municipio I	ancient	24
San Giovanni Battista dei Fiorentini	Municipio I	1918	181
San Giovanni Bosco	Municipio VII	1965	394
Santi Giovanni e Paolo al Celio	Municipio I	ancient	25
San Giuseppe al Trionfale	Municipio XIII	1970	404
San Lorenzo in Damaso	Municipio I	ancient	26
San Lorenzo in Lucina	Municipio I	1908	160
San Marco Evangelista al Campidoglio	Municipio I	ancient	27
Santa Maria degli Angeli e dei Martiri	Municipio I	1920	186
Santa Maria in Aracoeli	Municipio I	ancient	30
Santa Maria Ausiliatrice	Municipio VIII	1969	407
Santa Maria in Cosmedin	Municipio I	ancient	31
Santa Maria ad Martyres in Campo (Pantheon)	Municipio I	ancient	28
Santa Maria sopra Minerva	Municipio I	ancient	35
Santa Maria in Montesanto	Municipio I	1825	126
Santa Maria Nova (Santa Francesca Romana)	Municipio I	ancient	34
Santa Maria del Popolo	Municipio I	ancient	29
Santa Maria Regina degli Apostoli alla Montagnola	Municipio IX	1984	467
Santa Maria in Trastevere	Municipio I	ancient	32
Santa Maria in Via Lata	Municipio I	ancient	33
San Martino ai Monti	Municipio I	ancient	26
San Nicola in Carcere	Municipio I	ancient	37
San Pancrazio	Municipio XII	ancient	38
San Pietro in Vincoli	Municipio I	ancient	39
Santa Prassede all'Esquilino	Municipio I	ancient	40
Santa Pudenziana al Viminale	Municipio I	ancient	41
Santi Quattro Coronati al Laterano	Municipio I	ancient	42
San Saba	Municipio I	ancient	43
Santa Sabina all'Aventino	Municipio I	ancient	44
San Sebastiano fuori le mura	Municipio VIII	ancient	45
San Sisto Vecchio in Via Appia	Municipio I	ancient	46
Santa Sofia	Municipio XIII	1998	508
Santo Stefano Rotondo	Municipio I	ancient	47
Santa Teresa d'Avila	Municipio I	1951	309
Santi Vitale e Compagni Martiri in Fovea	Municipio I	ancient	48

== Sources ==
- List of all Minor Basilicas from GCatholic
