= Della Vittoria =

Q. XV Della Vittoria
- Quartiere of Rome
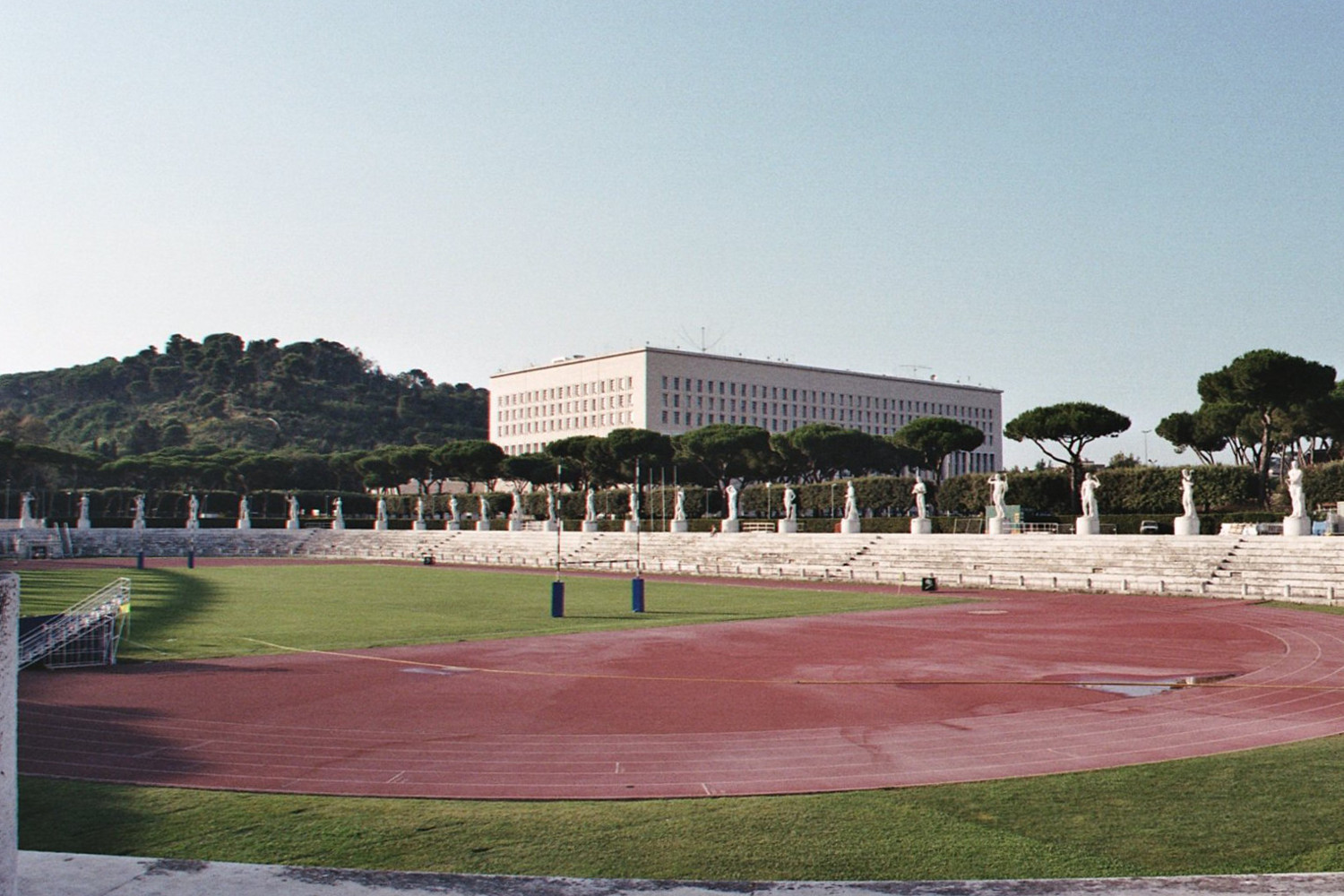
- Stadio dei Marmi overlooking the Ministry of Foreign Affairs

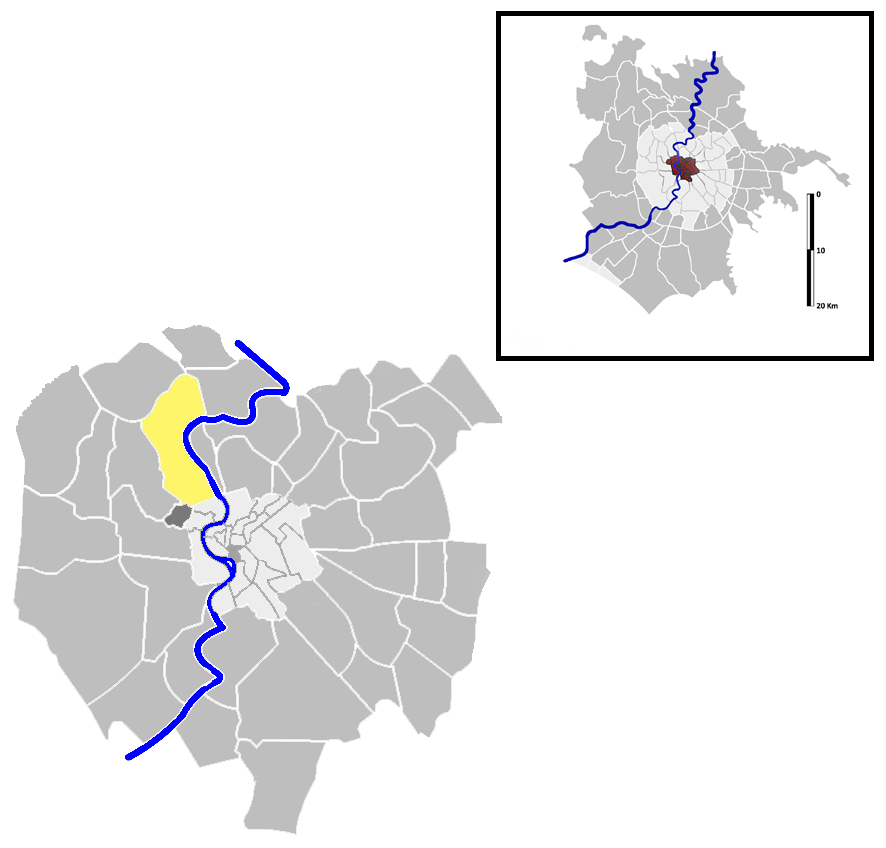
- Position of the quartiere within the city of Rome
- Country: Italy
- Region: Lazio
- Metropolitan City: Rome
- Comune: Rome
- Municipio: Municipio I Municipio XV
- Established: 20 August 1921

Area
  - Total: 2.38 sq mi (6.17 km^{2})

Population (2019)
  - Total: 35,404
- Time zone: UTC+1 (CET)
  - Summer (DST): UTC+2 (CEST)

Della Vittoria is the 15th quartiere of Rome, Italy, identified by the initials Q. XV. The toponym also indicates the urban zone 17B of Municipio I.
