= Democratic Party of Lazio (Italy) =

Regional branch of the Italian Democratic Party

The Democratic Party of Lazio (Italian: Partito Democratico del Lazio, PD Lazio) is one of the regional branches of the Italian Democratic Party (Partito Democratico) the major centre-left party in Italy. The Democratic Party of Lazio's regional secretary is Fabio Melilli elected in February 2014 by regional primary elections.

The Democratic Party of Lazio was founded on October 14, 2007 at the same time of Italian Democratic Party as a merger of various left-wing and centrist parties; its bulk was formed by the Democrats of the Left (heirs of the Italian Communist Party), Democracy is Freedom – The Daisy and Christian leftists, direct heirs of the late Christian Democracy's left.

== Leadership ==
The Secretary of the Democratic Party of Lazio is Fabio Melilli who was elected by the primaries on February 16, 2014 along with the regional assembly. On June 23, 2014, the Democratic Party of Lazio elected as its President Lorenza Bonaccorsi and as vice-presidents Caterina Rijllo and Paolo Acunzo.

=== Fabio Melilli, Secretary of the Democratic Party of Lazio ===
Fabio Melilli was born in Poggio Moiano, in the Rieti province of, in 1958. He is graduated in Law at the University of Rome “La Sapienza”. He was Director of ANCI the Association of Italian Municipalities and President of Ancitel, the computer services company of ANCI. He was a member of the National Committee for the Euro, created by the Italian Finance Minister for the start-up of the single European currency. He collaborates with Il Sole 24 Ore the most important Italian business newspaper, and he wrote several local finance essays. He was mayor of Poggio Moiano, President of the Rieti province and also president of the Union of Italian Provinces (UPI). He is member of the Italian Parliament for the Democratic Party and member of V Commission (Budget, Treasury and Planning).

=== Lorenza Bonaccorsi, president of the Democratic Party of Lazio Assembly ===
Lorenza Bonaccorsi was born in Rome on July 20, 1968 and she graduated from the State University of Milan with a degree in economic history with professor Giulio Sapelli. Since 2001 she has worked at the Auditorium "Parco della Musica in Rome" where she directed the communications department until 2006. From 2006 to 2008 she was head of the secretariat of Paolo Gentiloni, Minister of Communications of Prodi government. From 2008 to 2010 she was head of Institutional Relations and Relationship with the European Union for the Lazio Region. In 2010, she returned to work at the Auditorium of Rome as head of developing new magazines and new commercial products. Thanks to the “parlamentarie” - i.g the primaries for choosing the candidates members of Parliament for the Democratic Party - in 2013 she was elected at the Parliament in Lazio district. She is part of the IX Commission “Transport and Telecommunications” of the Italian Parliament. Since September 16, 2014, Lorenza is part of the National Secretariat of the Democratic Party led by Matteo Renzi.

=== Caterina Rijllo, vice president of the Democratic Party of Lazio Assembly ===
Rijllo Catherine was born in Catanzaro in 1985. She deals with Economy and Finance at the University of Rome - La Sapienza, where she earned a degree in Economics. She began her political activities in Catanzaro, where in 2010 she was elected national delegate of Young Democrats. In 2013, she moved to Rome, where she was elected secretary of the “Pigneto Prenestino” section of Democratic Party.

=== Paolo Acunzo, vice president of the Democratic Party of Lazio Assembly ===
Paolo Acunzo was born in Rome in 1971. He has two children, and he is responsible for international relations of one of the major Italian institutions in the field of research and innovation. He is active in the volunteer field and he has always been involved with different European issues. Particularly, he was Secretary of Rome and deputy General Secretary of the “Movimento Federalista Europeo”. In the 1990s he joined the PDS-DS and founded in Brussels the electoral committee for “Ulivo” the left-wing alliance and so he was elected into the Constituent Assembly of the National Democratic Party. He is a member of the “Aurelio – Cavallegeri” section of Democratic Party.
