= Lorenza Bonaccorsi =

Italian politician

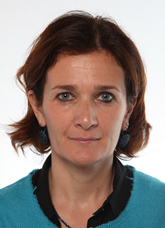

President of Municipio I of Rome
- Incumbent
- Assumed office 18 October 2021
- Preceded by: Sabrina Alfonsi

Member of the Chamber of Deputies
- In office 15 March 2013 – 22 March 2018
- Constituency: Rome

Personal details
- Born: 20 July 1968 (age 58) Rome, Italy
- Party: Democratic Party
- Education: University of Milan
- Profession: Politician

Lorenza Bonaccorsi (born July 20, 1968 in Rome) is an Italian politician.

She graduated in Economic History at the University of Milan. Since 2001 she has worked at the Auditorium "Parco della Musica in Rome" where she directed the communications department until 2006.

== Career ==
From 2006 to 2008 she was head of the secretariat of Paolo Gentiloni, Minister of Communications of Prodi government.

From 2008 to 2010 she was head of Institutional Relations and Relationship with the European Union for the Lazio Region.

In 2010, she returned to work at the Auditorium of Rome for developing new products and services.

=== Parliament election ===
Thanks to the “parlamentarie” – i.g the primaries for choosing the candidates members of Italian Parliament for the Democratic Party – in 2013 Lorenza Bonaccorsi was elected at the Italian Parliament in Lazio district.

She is part of the IX Commission “Transport and Telecommunications” of the Italian Parliament and since 2014 March 14 of the parliamentary Commission that oversees RAI, the Italian public TV.

=== Democratic Party of Lazio presidency ===
On June 23, 2014, the Democratic Party of Lazio elected as its President Lorenza Bonaccorsi.

=== National Secretariat of the Democratic Party ===
Since September 16, 2014, Lorenza is part of the National Secretariat of the Democratic Party led by Matteo Renzi.
