= Municipio I =

Coordinates: 41°53′35″N 12°28′58″E

Municipio I di Roma
- Municipio of Rome
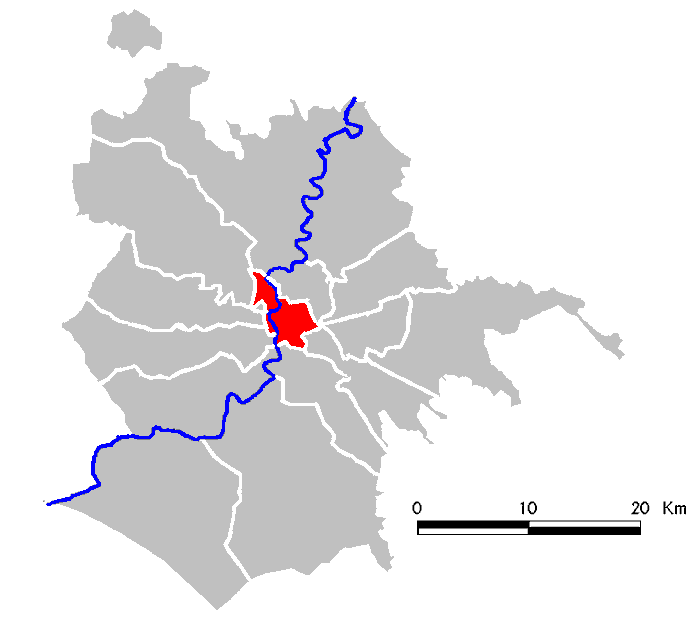
- Location of Municipio I of Rome
- Country: Italy
- Region: Lazio
- Comune: Rome
- Established: 19 January 2001; 11 March 2013 (resized)

Government
  - President: Lorenza Bonaccorsi (PD)

Area
  - Total: 7.69 sq mi (19.91 km^{2})

Population (2023)
  - Total: 165,435
  - Density: 24,300/sq mi (9,382/km^{2})
- Time zone: UTC+1 (CET)
  - Summer (DST): UTC+2 (CEST)
- Website: Municipio I of Rome

Municipio I is an administrative subdivision of the municipality of Rome, encompassing the centre of the city.

It was first created by the City Council of Rome on 19 January 2001 and has a president who is elected every five years. On 11 March 2013 its borders were modified and it was expanded with the incorporation of the abolished Municipio XVII. Since then, all 22 rioni of Rome (the city's historic districts) form part of Municipio I, alongside the quarters of Prati, Della Vittoria, and parts of Trionfale (including the Eroi urban zone).

== Subdivision ==
Municipio I is divided into 11 urban zones:

Urban zone	Population
1A. Historical Centre	23,693
1B. Trastevere	13,447
1C. Aventino	8,251
1D. Testaccio	7,671
1E. Esquilino	33,017
1F. XX Settembre	8,796
1G. Celio	3,857
1X. Archeological Zone	763
17A. Prati	17,381
17B. Della Vittoria	25,151
17C. Eroi	18,917
Not localized	4,491
Total	165,435

=== Rioni ===
As many cities in Italy, the historic centre of Rome is also subdivided into 22 historical rioni, medieval subdivisions which survives today.

Rione		Coat of arms	Population	Rione		Coat of arms	Population
1	Monti		11,956	12	Ripa		2,477
2	Trevi		2,063	13	Trastevere		12,962
3	Colonna		1,898	14	Borgo		2,698
4	Campo Marzio		5,470	15	Esquilino		21,263
5	Ponte		3,375	16	Ludovisi		1,546
6	Parione		2,283	17	Sallustiano		2,191
7	Regola		3,017	18	Castro Pretorio		5,228
8	Sant'Eustachio		1,839	19	Celio		2,439
9	Pigna		2,624	20	Testaccio		7,563
10	Campitelli		515	21	San Saba		3,366
11	Sant'Angelo		990	22	Prati		14,631

==== Gallery ====
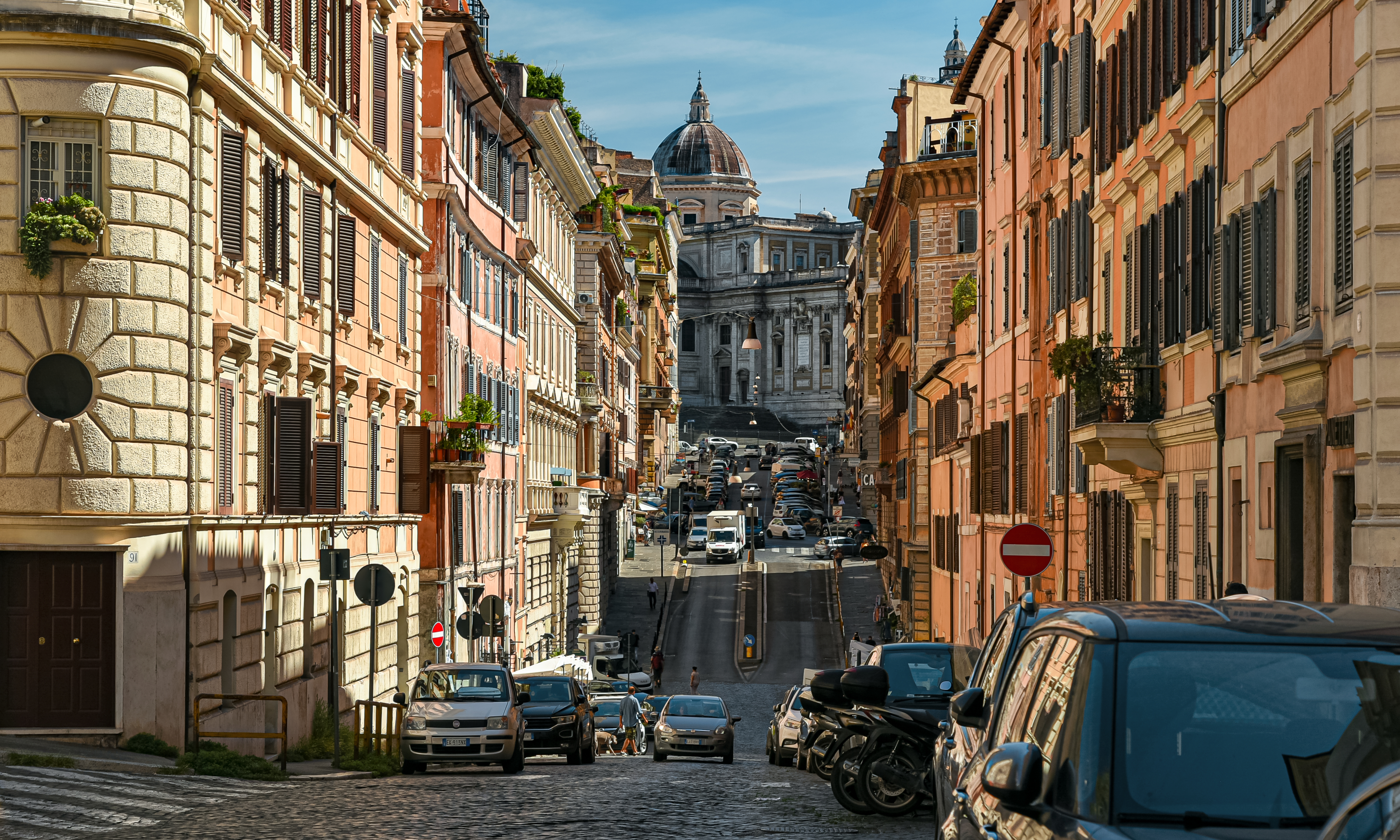
Monti

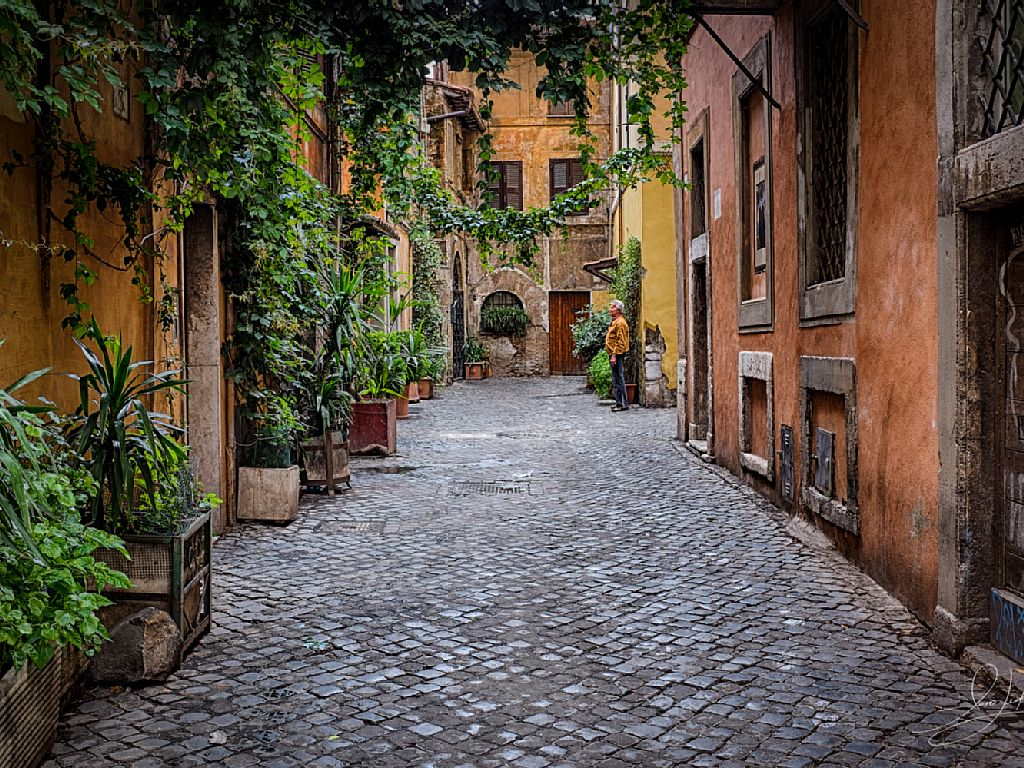
Trastevere

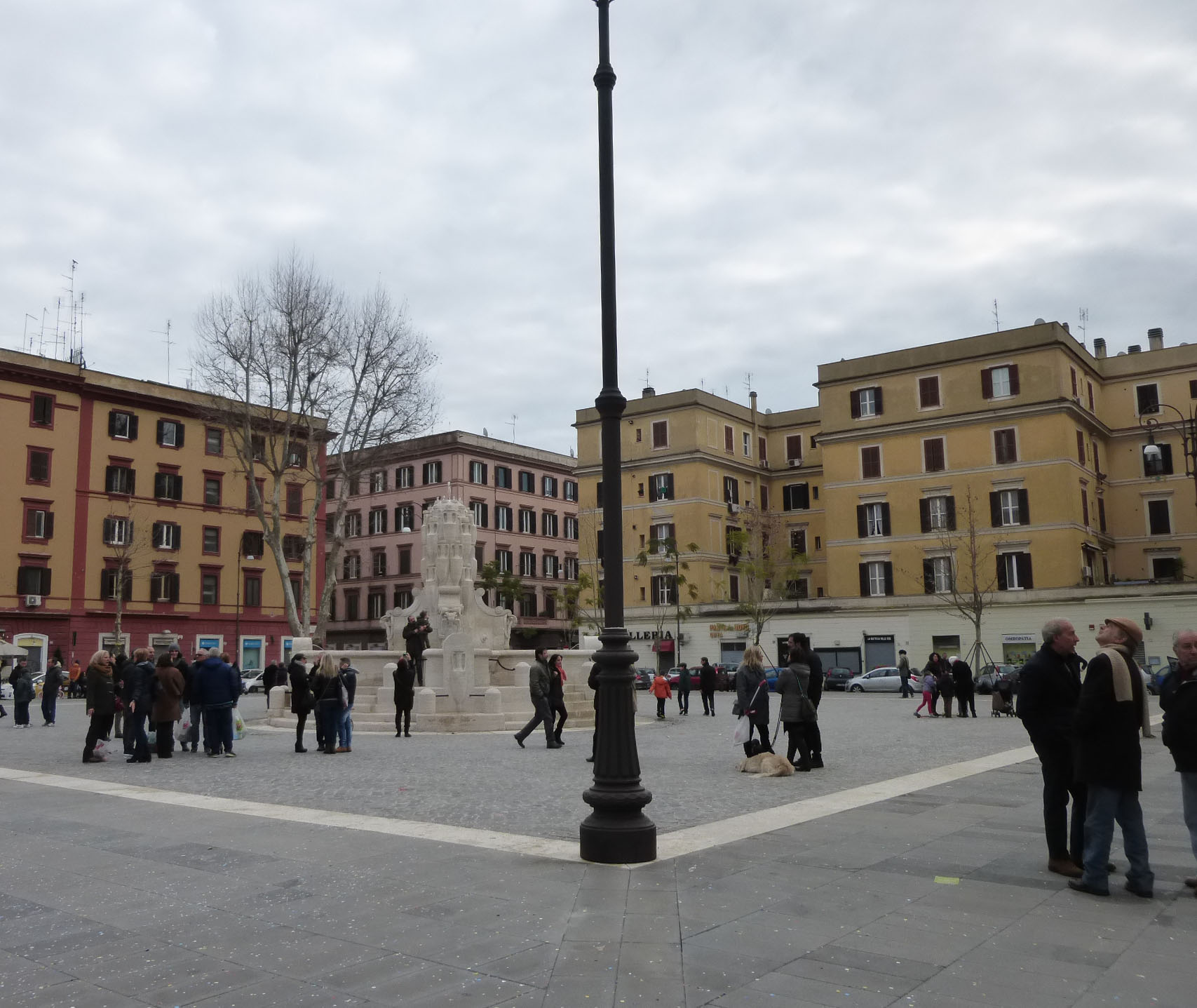
Testaccio

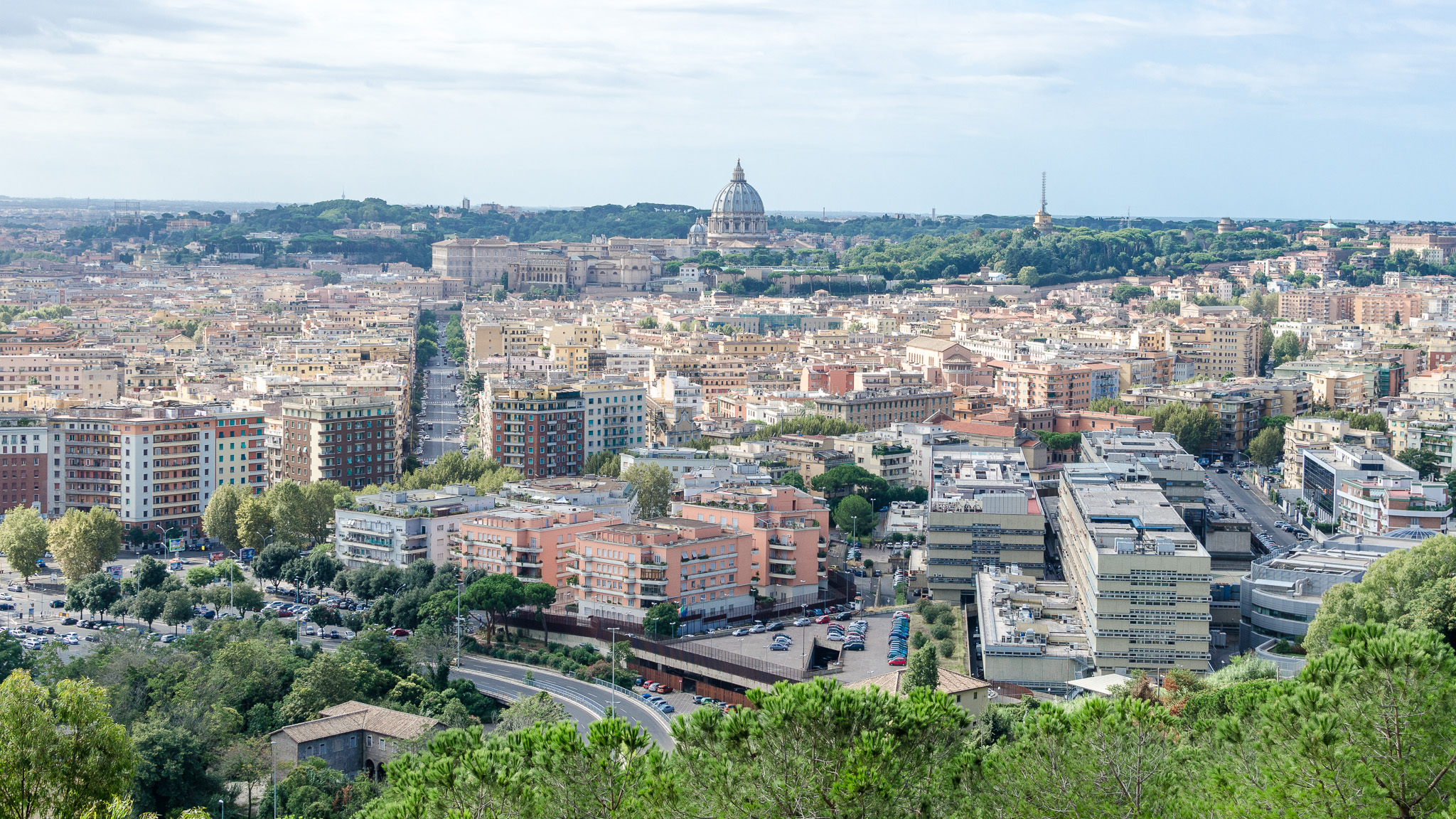
Prati

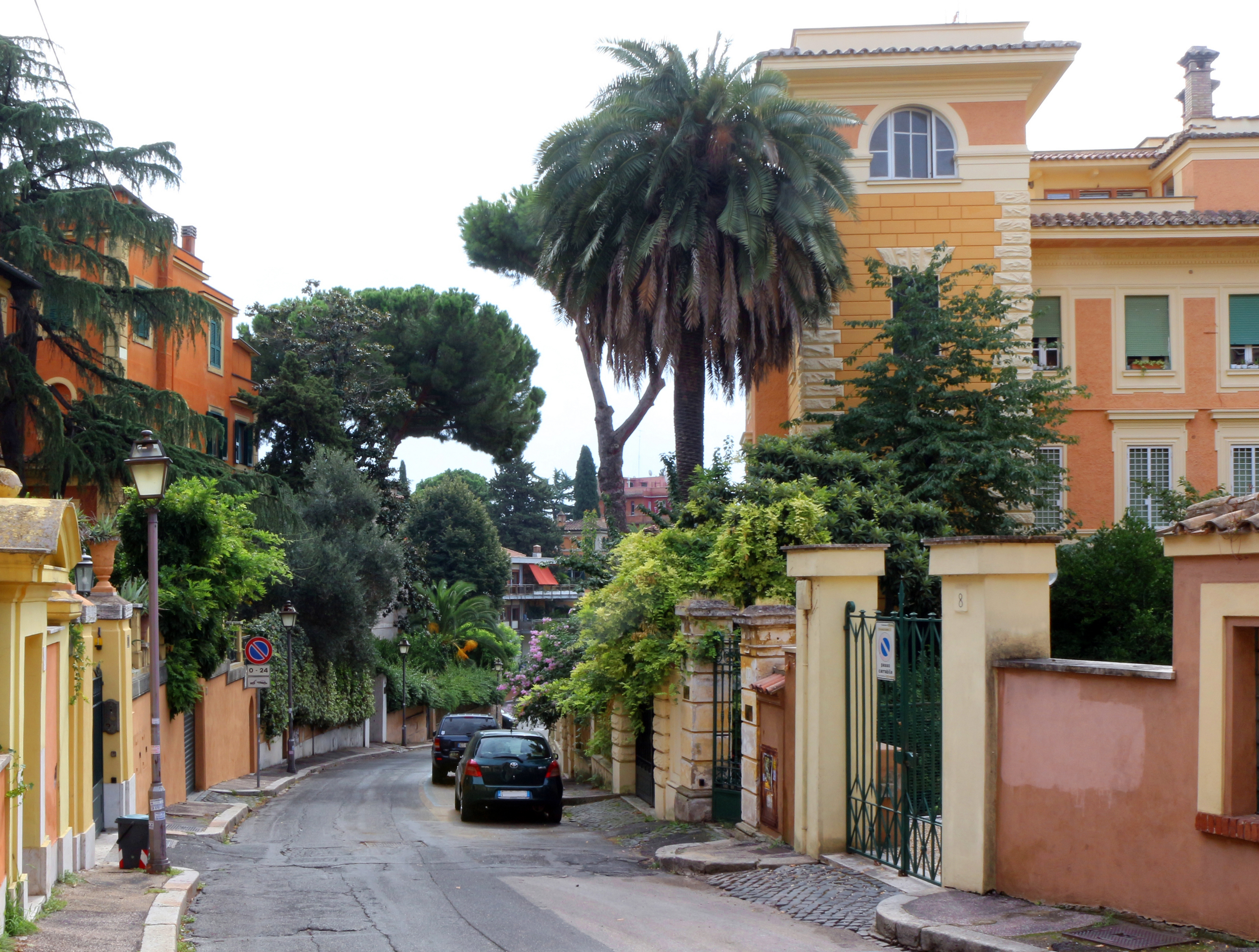
Ripa

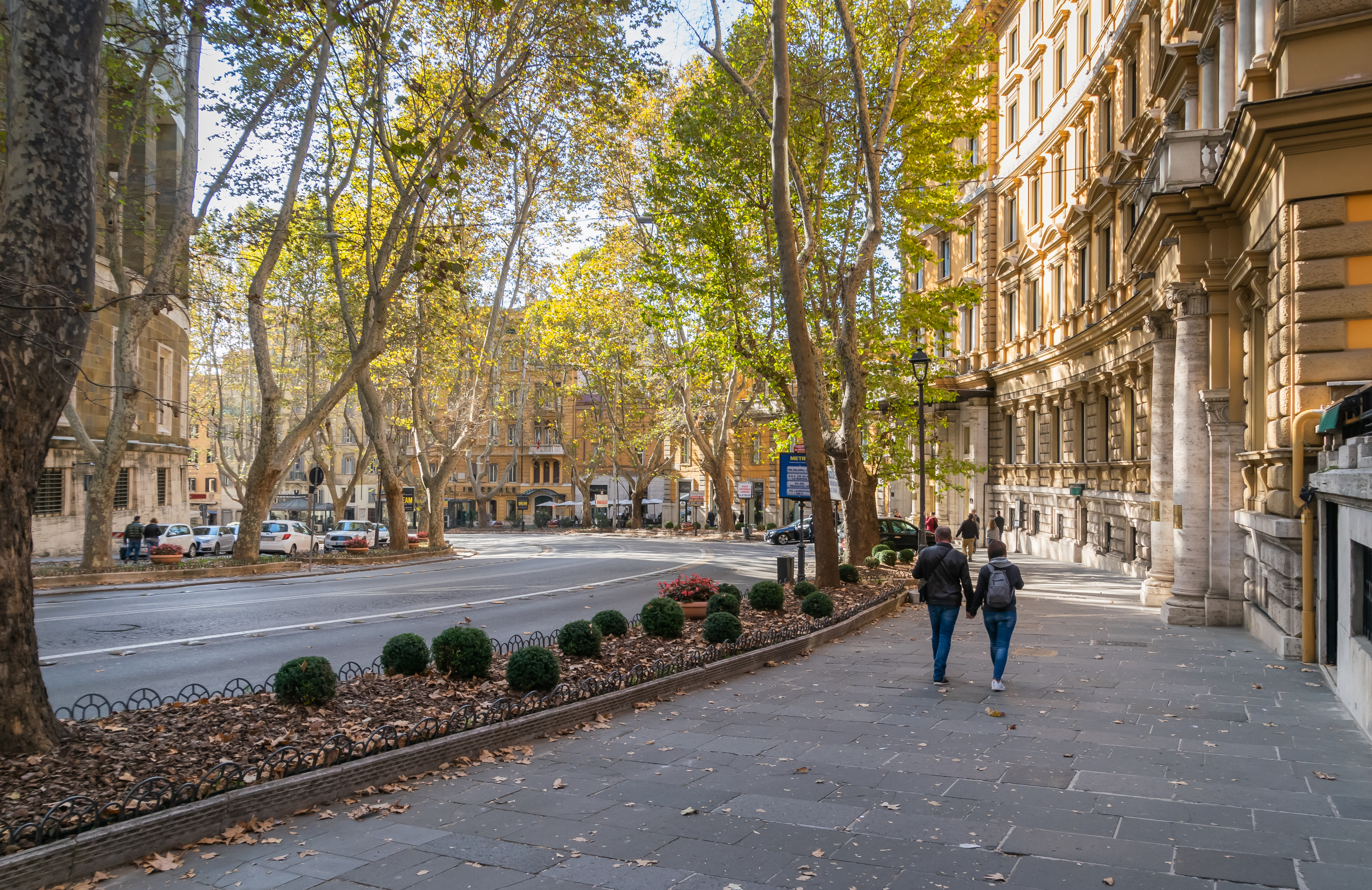
Ludovisi

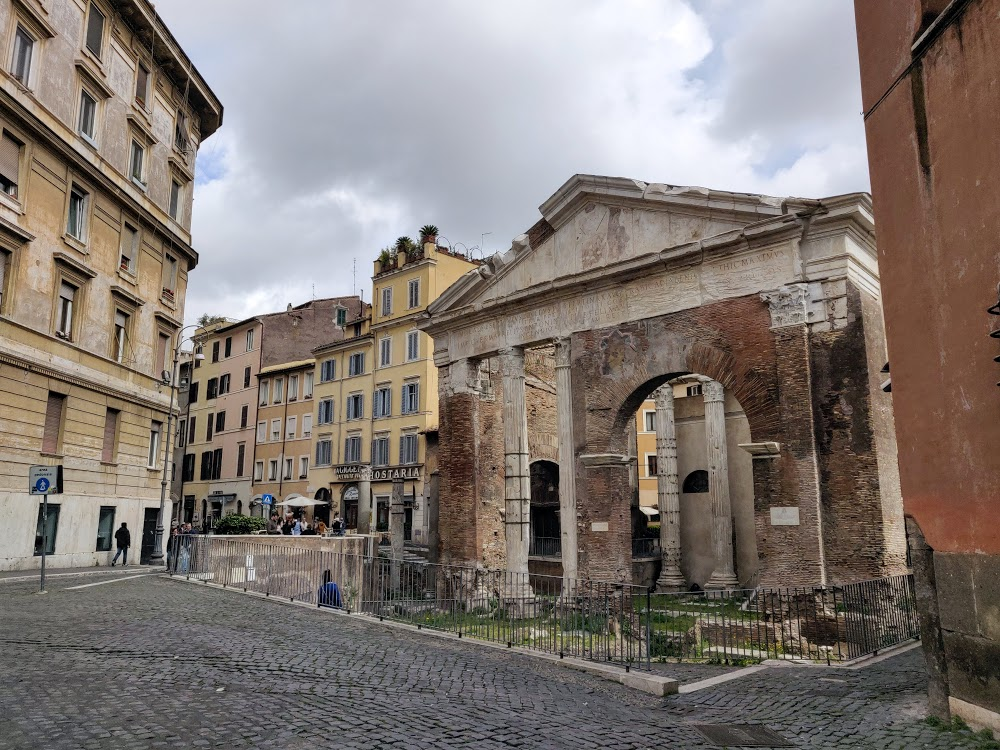
Sant'Angelo

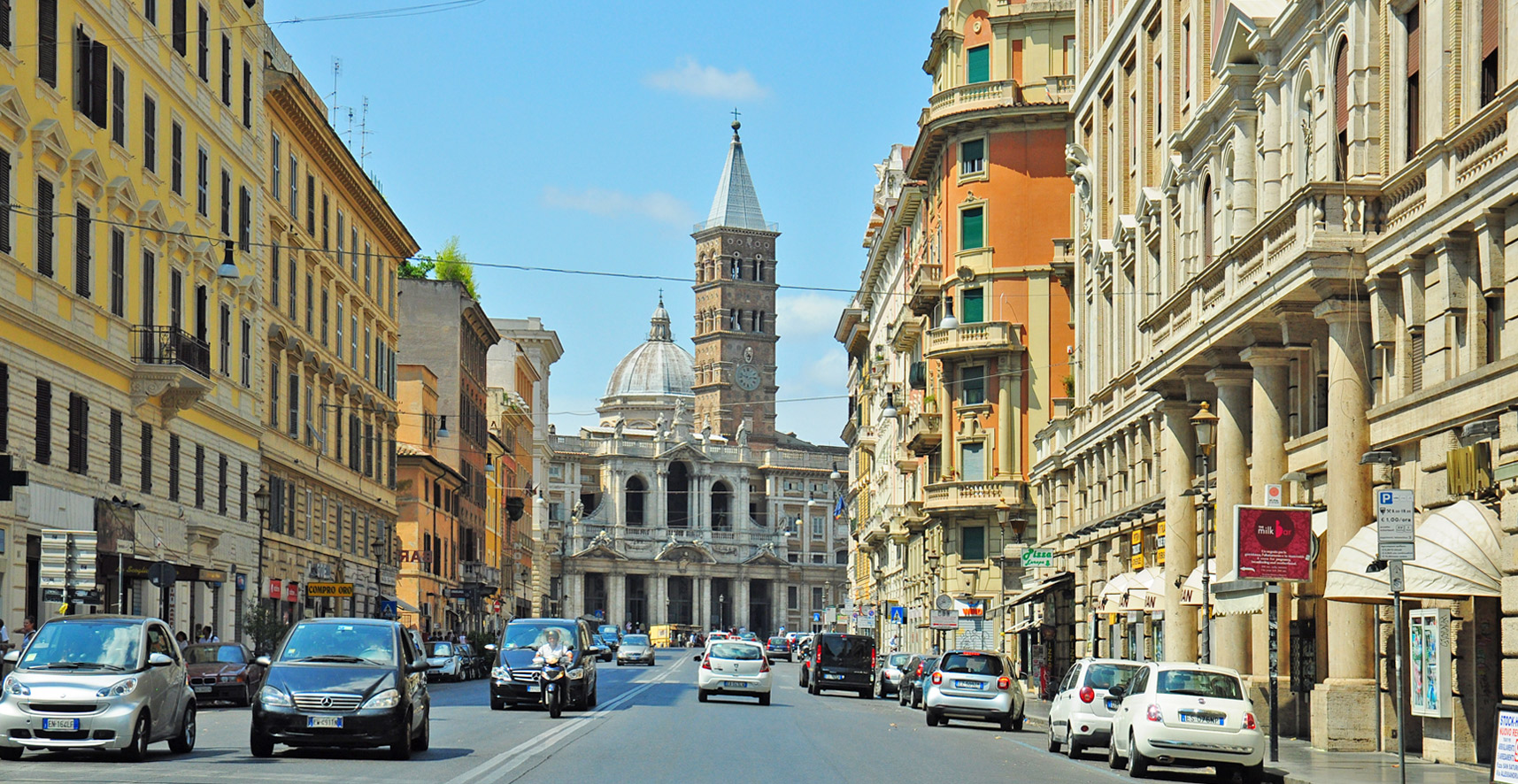
Esquilino

== Municipal government ==
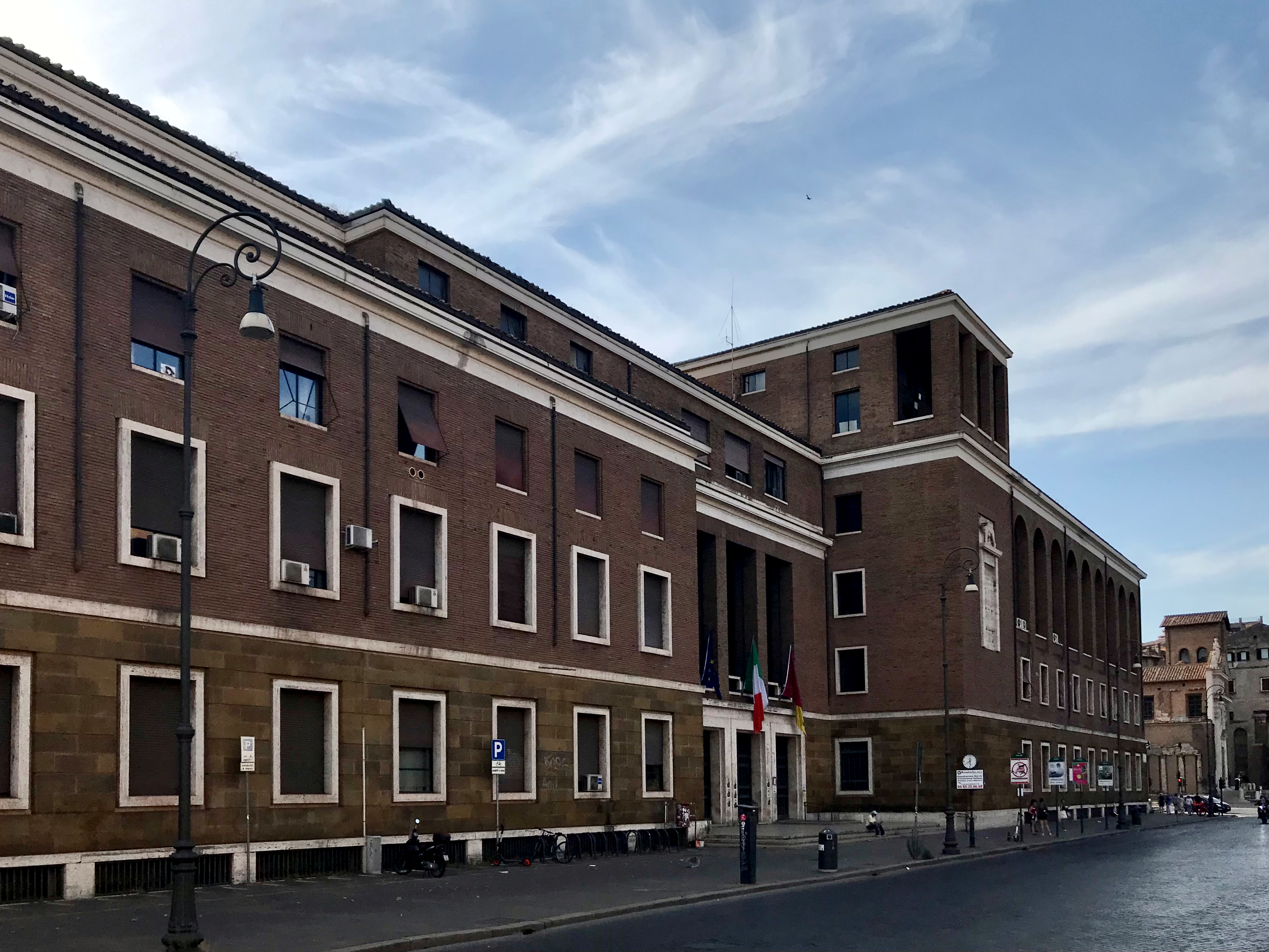
The seat of Municipio I in Via Petroselli.

The area has its own local authority called Consiglio di Municipio (Municipal Council), composed by a president and 25 members directly elected by citizens every five years. The council is responsible for most local services, such as schools, social services, waste collection, roads, parks, libraries and local commerce in the area, and manages funds (if any) provided by the city government for specific purposes, such as those intended to guarantee the right to education for poorer families.

The current president is Lorenza Bonaccorsi (PD). She was elected in the 2021 Rome municipal election together with the 25-member Municipal Council, whose composition is shown below:

Alliance or political party	Members	
Alliance or political party	2021–2027	
Centre-left (PD-SI-DemoS)	16	16 / 25
Centre-right (Lega-FdI)	5	5 / 25
Action (A)	3	3 / 25
Five Star Movement (M5S)	1	1 / 25

Here is a list of presidents of the Municipio I since 2001:

President	Party	Coalition	Term of office	
Giuseppe Lobefaro	DL	Centre-left	30 May 2001	15 April 2008
Orlando Corsetti	PD	Centre-left	15 April 2008	11 June 2013
Sabrina Alfonsi	PD	Centre-left	11 June 2013	18 October 2021
Lorenza Bonaccorsi	PD	Centre-left	18 October 2021	Incumbent

== Geography ==
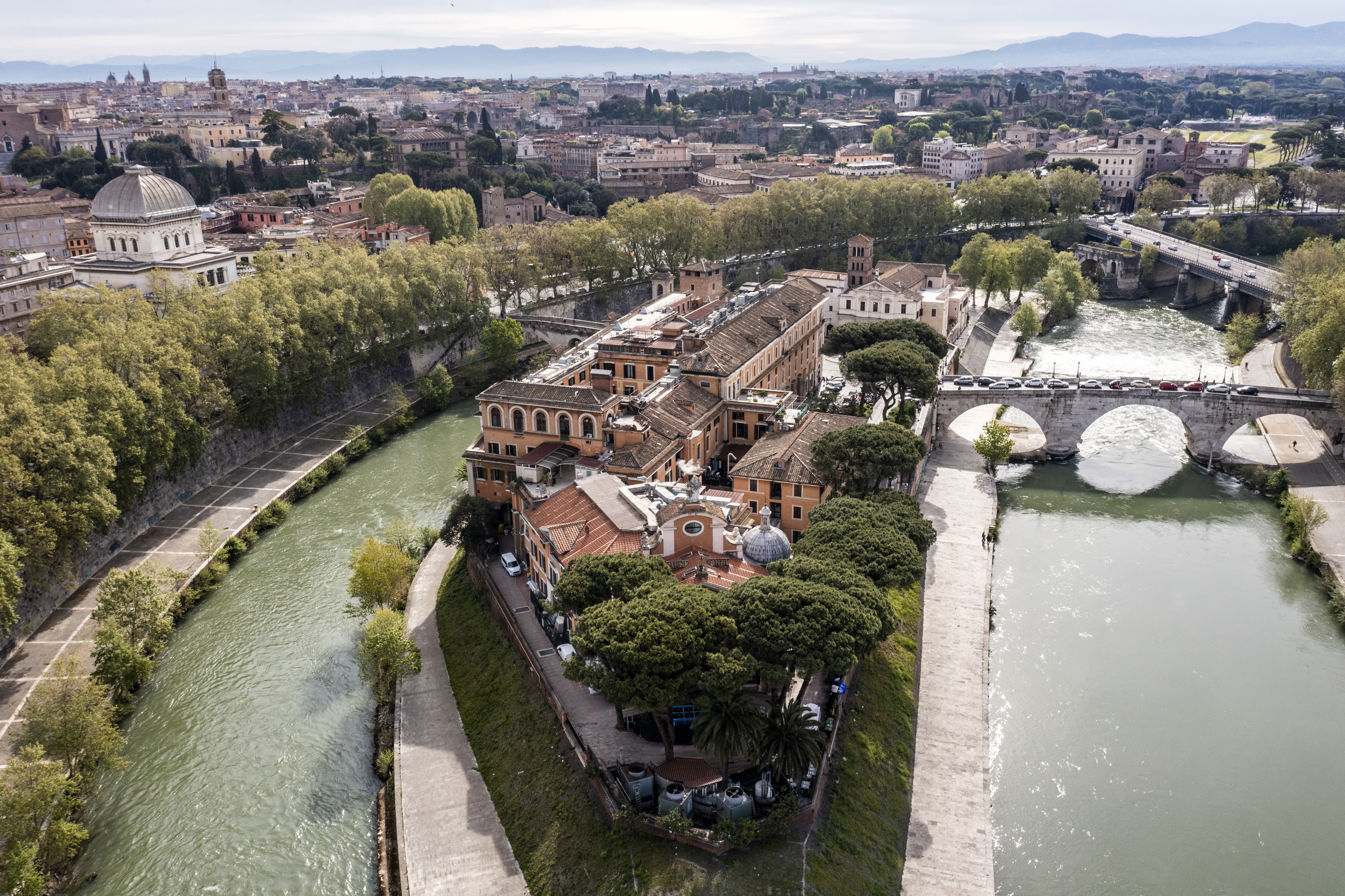
Tiber Island, which is part of rione Ripa.

The area of the municipality occupies the central districts of the city, including the entire historic center enclosed by the Aurelian Walls and the Janiculum walls. Crossed by the Tiber, this historic core is inscribed on UNESCO's World Heritage Site list. The quarters built across the river in the late 19th and early 20th centuries between the Vatican Hill and Monte Mario — specifically Prati, and parts of Della Vittoria and Trionfale — are also within its borders.

The ancient heart of the municipality features the historic seven hills (Palatine, Aventine, Capitoline, Quirinal, Viminal, Esquiline, and Caelian), alongside the Janiculum, the Pincian Hill, and the artificial hillocks of Monte Testaccio and Monte Giordano. The Tiber Island also rises along the urban stretch of the river.

=== Piazzas ===
As the historic core of Rome, Municipio I contains many of the world's most famous public squares, serving as vital cultural, political, and architectural landmarks:

==== Monumental and Historical Squares ====
- Piazza Navona – Built on the site of the 1st-century AD Stadium of Domitian, it is a masterpiece of Baroque architecture featuring Bernini's Fontana dei Quattro Fiumi.
- Piazza di Spagna – Famous for the Spanish Steps rising to the Trinità dei Monti church and Bernini's Fontana della Barcaccia.
- Piazza del Popolo – A grand neoclassical square designed by Giuseppe Valadier, marking the northern entrance to the historic center through the Porta del Popolo.
- Piazza Venezia – The central geographic hub of Rome, dominated by the massive Vittoriano (Altare della Patria).
- Piazza della Rotonda – The lively square located directly in front of the Pantheon, featuring a central renaissance fountain and an ancient Egyptian obelisk.
- Piazza del Campidoglio – Located atop the Capitoline Hill, this renaissance square was designed entirely by Michelangelo and serves as the seat of Rome's municipal government.
- Piazza Colonna – Named after the ancient Column of Marcus Aurelius, it is the heart of Italian political life, bordered by Palazzo Chigi (the official residence of the Prime Minister).

==== Cultural and Social Hubs ====
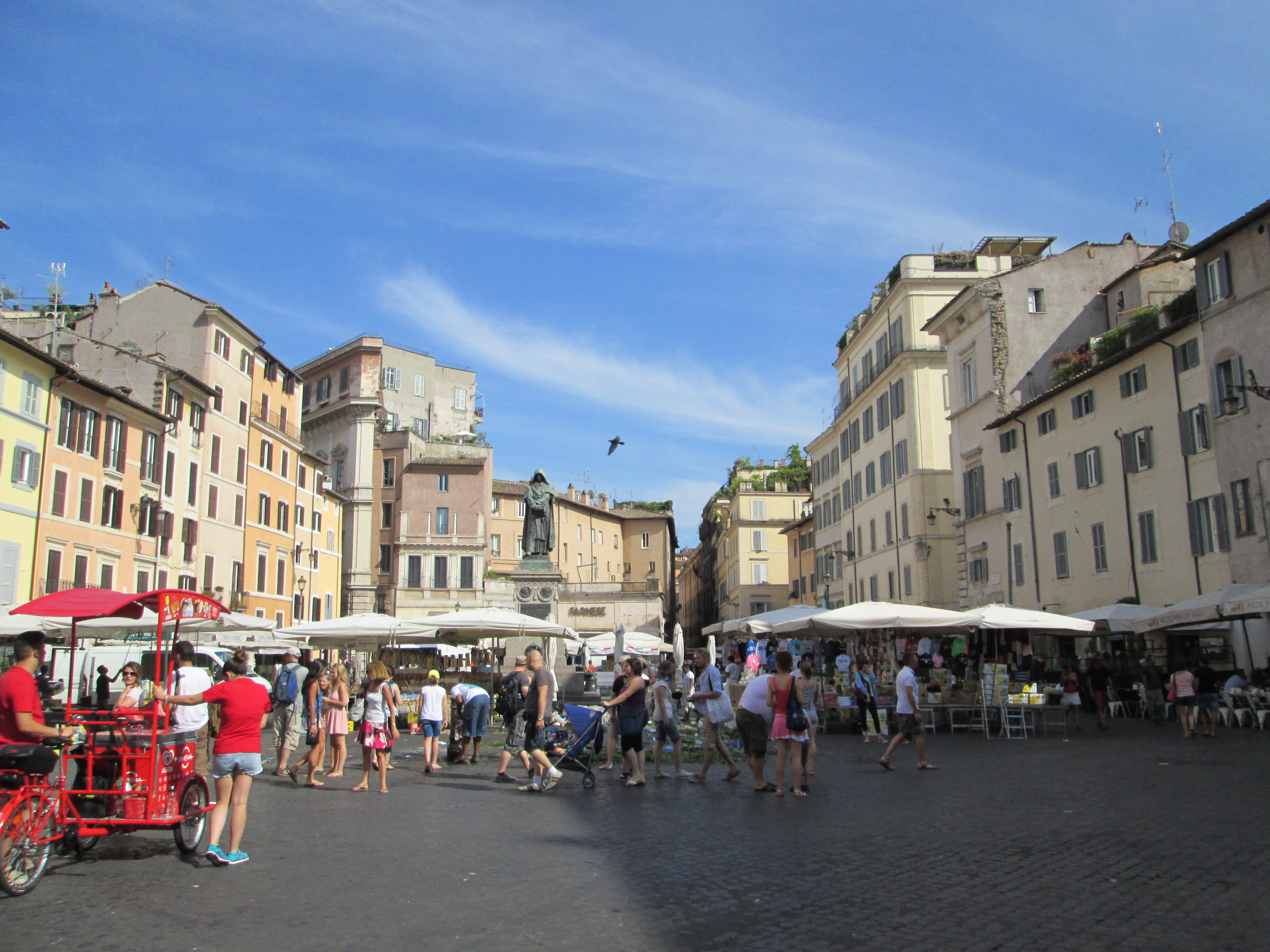
Daily morning market in Campo de' Fiori.

- Campo de' Fiori – A historic marketplace famous for its daily morning market and lively nightlife, centered around the bronze statue of philosopher Giordano Bruno.
- Piazza di Santa Maria in Trastevere – The social heart of the Trastevere rione, located in front of one of the city's oldest basilicas.
- Piazza del Quirinale – Located atop the Quirinal Hill, offering sweeping views of the city and hosting the Quirinal Palace, the official residence of the President of the Italian Republic.
- Piazza di Trevi – The compact, bustling square famed entirely for housing the iconic Trevi Fountain.
- Piazza Barberini – A major urban square featuring Bernini's Triton Fountain, bridging the historic center with the Via Veneto district.
- Piazza Cavour – A large, elegant square located in the Prati quarter (added to the municipio in 2013), dominated by the monumental Palace of Justice (Corte di Cassazione).

== Education ==
The municipio hosts a high concentration of prominent secondary education institutions, including some of the oldest and most prestigious licei in Italy:

=== Upper secondary schools ===
==== Licei ====
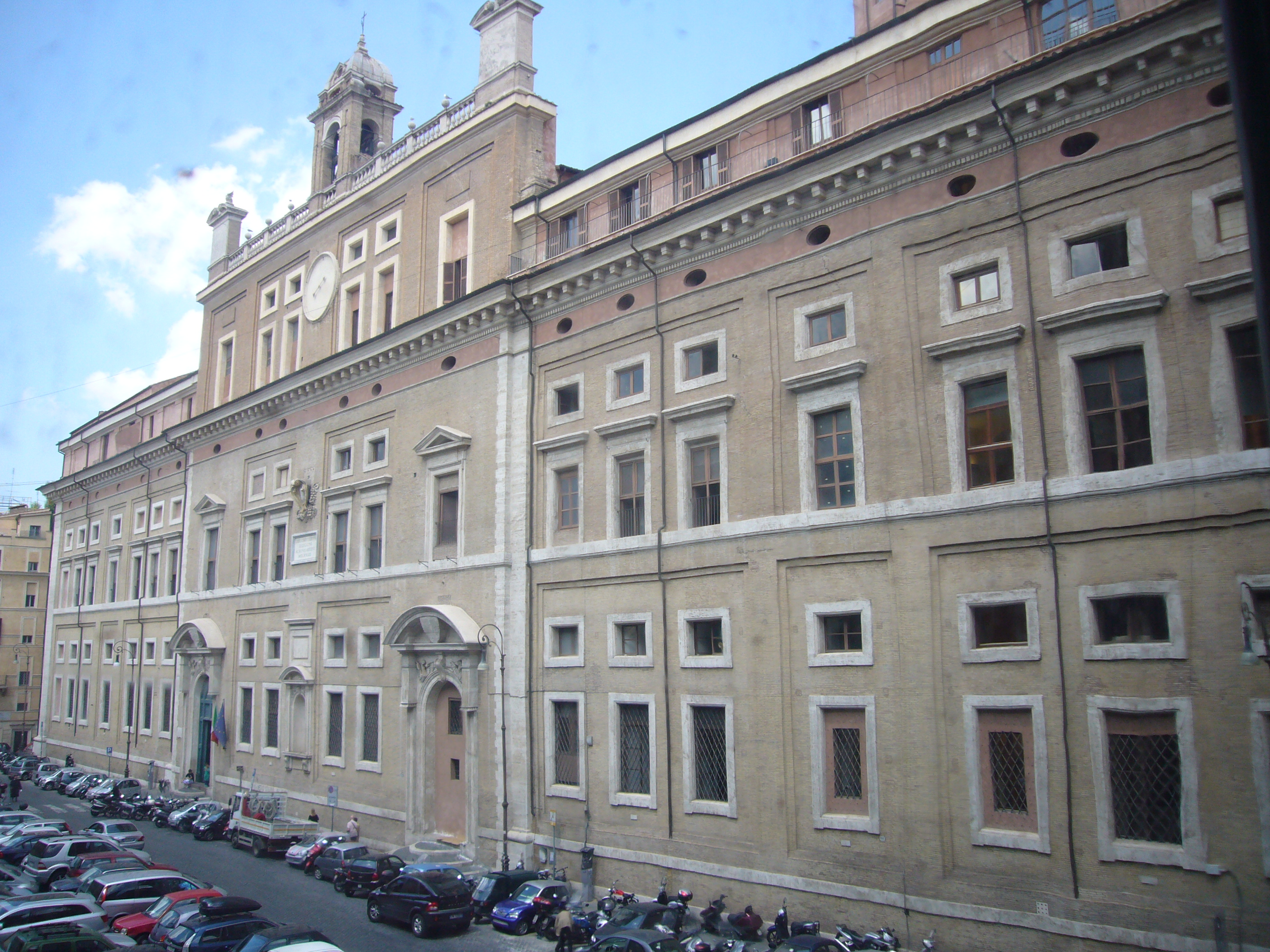
Ennio Quirino Visconti Liceo Ginnasio in Piazza del Collegio Romano.

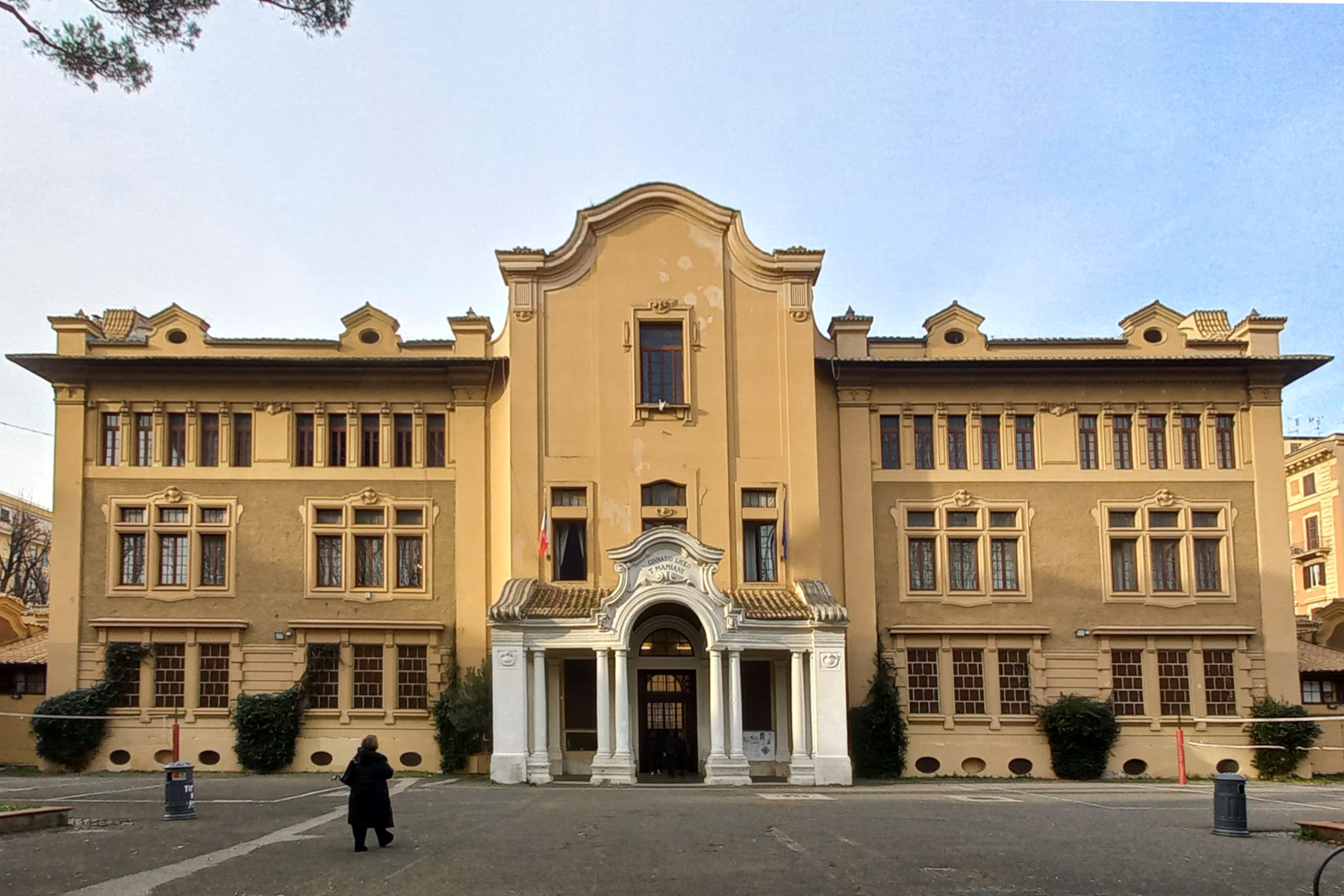
Liceo Ginnasio Terenzio Mamiani.

- Ennio Quirino Visconti Liceo Ginnasio – Located in Piazza del Collegio Romano, it is the oldest classical lyceum in Rome, established in 1871 inside the historic Collegio Romano building.
- Liceo classico Torquato Tasso – Located in Via Sicilia (Ludovisi rione), it is one of the city's most prestigious classical high schools.
- Liceo scientifico statale Camillo Cavour – Located in Via delle Carine (Monti rione), it was the first scientific high school established in Rome (1923).
- Liceo Ginnasio Statale Terenzio Mamiani – Located in Via delle Milizie.
- Liceo Ginnasio Statale Virgilio – Located in the historic Via Giulia, offering classical, scientific, and linguistic tracks.
- Liceo Classico Pilo Albertelli – Located in Via Daniele Manin, near the Basilica of Santa Maria Maggiore.
- Liceo Artistico Ripetta – Located in Via di Ripetta, a historic fine-arts high school tracing its origins back to the 19th century.
- Liceo Statale Niccolò Machiavelli – Headquartered in Piazza dell'Indipendenza, specializing in foreign languages and human sciences.
- Liceo Talete – Located in Via Federigo Enriques (Prati area), specializing in scientific studies.
- Convitto Nazionale Vittorio Emanuele II – Located in Piazza Monte Grappa, a historic boarding school complex hosting a classical lyceum and a scientific lyceum (including an international Chinese-language track).

==== Technical and Vocational Institutes ====
- ITIS Galileo Galilei – Located in Via Conte Verde (Esquilino rione), a major state industrial and technological institute.
- Istituto d'Istruzione Superior De Amicis - Cattaneo – Located in Via Luigi Galvani (Testaccio rione), offering vocational paths in craftsmanship, health-social services, and optics.
- Istituto Tecnico per il Turismo Cristoforo Colombo – Located in Via Panisperna (Monti rione), specializing in tourism and commercial industries.
- IISS Leonardo Da Vinci – Located in Via Cavour, offering economic, administrative, and technological curricula.

==== International and Private Schools ====
- St. Stephen's International School – A private, co-educational American international school located in Via Aventina.
- Liceo Spagnolo Cervantes – Located on the Janiculum hill (Via di Porta San Pancrazio), an international school administered directly by the Spanish Ministry of Education.
- Liceo Renzo Levi – Located in Via del Portico d'Ottavia within the historic Roman Ghetto, a private Jewish school offering scientific and linguistic high school tracks.

=== Higher education ===
The municipio contains a dense concentration of higher education institutions, ranging from major public university faculties to prestigious international pontifical universities and fine-arts academies:

==== Public and Private Universities ====
- Sapienza University of Rome – While the main campus (Città Universitaria) is in Municipio II, several historical faculties are based in Municipio I, including the Faculty of Architecture in Piazza Borghese and Via Ripetta, and the Faculty of Engineering in Via Eudossiana near San Pietro in Vincoli.
- Roma Tre University – The university operates its specialized School of Architecture inside the former slaughterhouse complex (Ex Mattatoio) in the Testaccio rione.
- Link Campus University – A private university headquartered in the historic complex of Casale San Pio V near the western boundary of the district.

==== Pontifical Universities ====
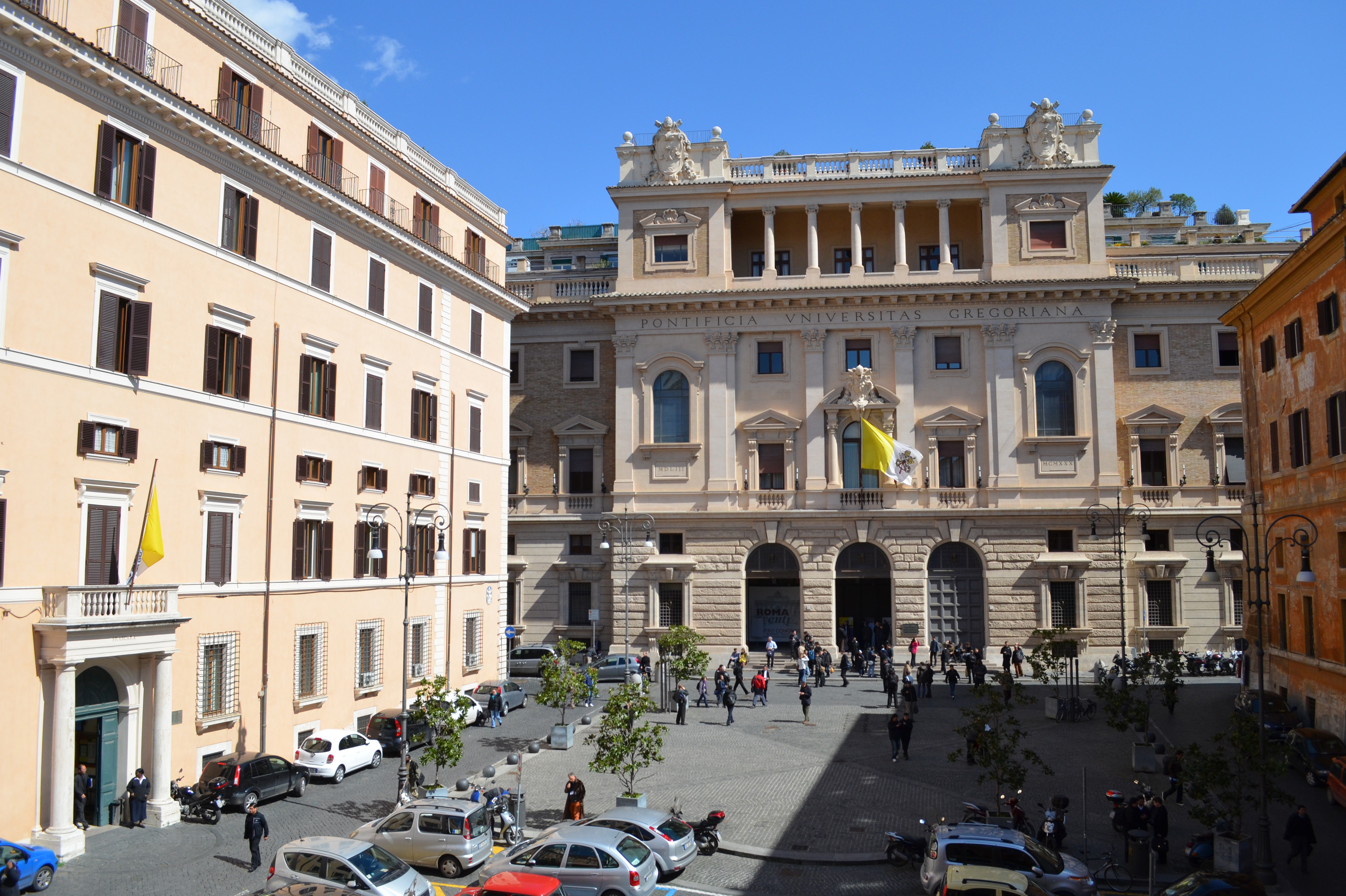
Pontifical Gregorian University in Piazza della Pilotta.

Due to its immediate proximity to the Vatican City, Municipio I hosts the headquarters of many world-renowned Catholic pontifical universities:

- Pontifical Gregorian University – Located in Piazza della Pilotta, it is the oldest Jesuit university in the world.
- Pontifical University of St. Thomas Aquinas (Angelicum) – Located in Largo Angelicum on the Quirinal Hill, run by the Dominican Order.
- Pontifical Urban University – Located on the Janiculum Hill, dedicated to training missionary clergy.
- Pontifical University of the Holy Cross – Located in Piazza di Sant'Apollinare, near Piazza Navona.
- Pontifical University Antonianum – Located in Via Merulana, managed by the Franciscan Friars Minor.

==== Academies of Fine Arts and Music (AFAM) ====
- Accademia di Belle Arti di Roma – Located in the historic Via di Ripetta, it is one of Italy's premier public academies of fine arts.
- Conservatorio di Santa Cecilia – Located in Via dei Greci, it is Rome's historic state music conservatory, occupying the premises of the former convent of the Ursulines.
- Accademia Nazionale d'Arte Drammatica Silvio D'Amico – Headquartered in Via Vincenzo Bellini, it maintains its historic study centers and theater halls within the central district.
- Istituto Superiore per le Industrie Artistiche (ISIA Roma) – Located in Piazza della Maddalena, specializing in industrial design.

== Culture ==
=== Libraries ===
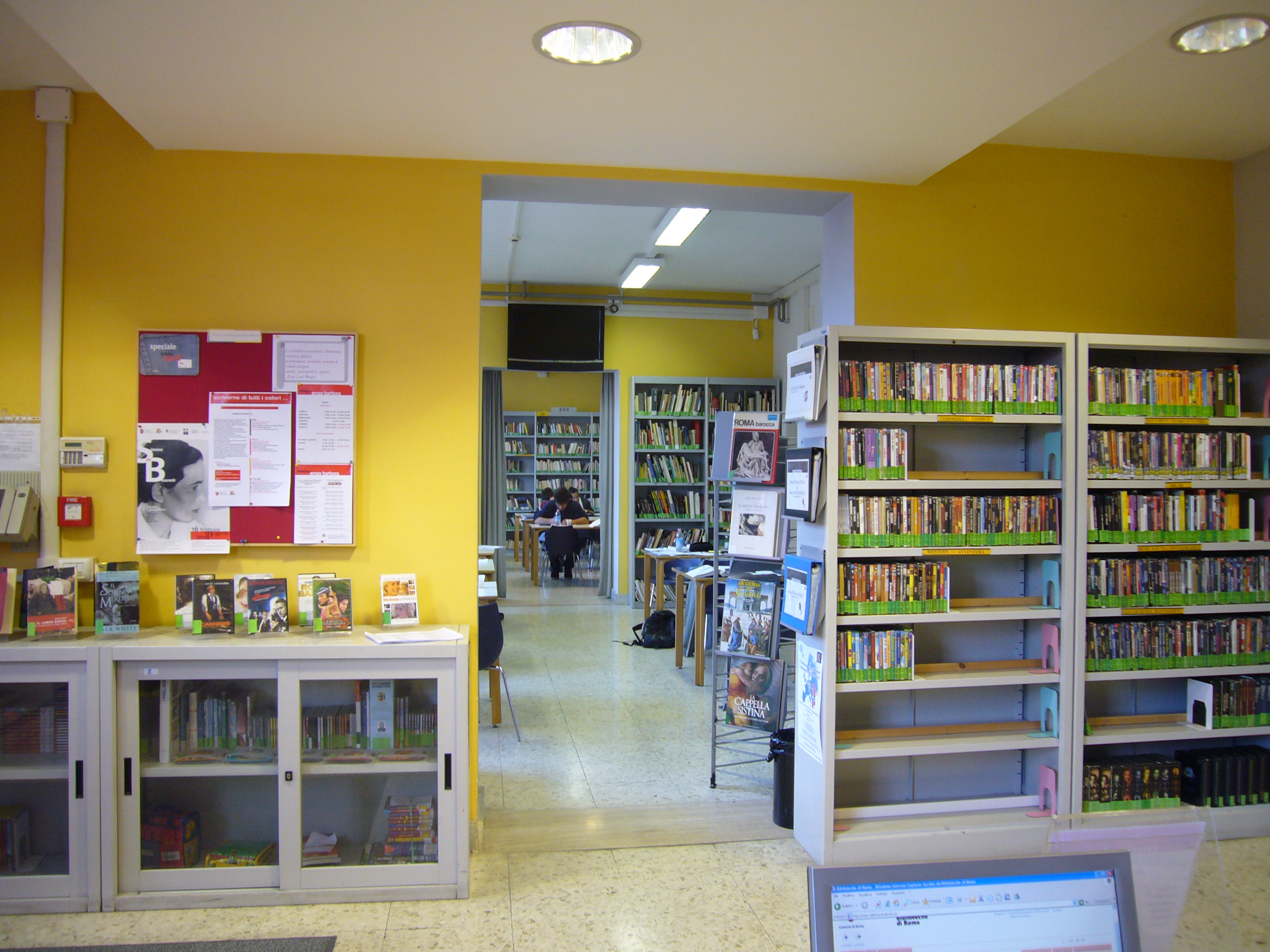
Enzo Tortora public library in Via Porta Portese.

Here is a list of public libraries run by the Municipal Council of Municipio I:

- Casa delle Letterature – Located in Piazza dell'Orologio, it is dedicated to 20th-century and contemporary literature.
- Casa della Memoria e della Storia – Located in Via di San Francesco di Sales (Trastevere), focused on the history of the 20th century, fascism, the resistance, and the liberation of Rome.
- Casa delle Traduzioni – Located in Via degli Avignonesi, it specializes in translation studies and promotes the translation of Italian literature abroad.
- Centrale Ragazzi – Located in Via di San Paolo alla Regola, it is the central public library specifically dedicated to children and young adults.
- Enzo Tortora – Located in Via di Porta Portese, a multifunctional cultural center and public library.
- Giordano Bruno – Located in Via Giordano Bruno (Prati district), serving the northern part of the municipal territory.
- Romana Sarti – Located in Piazza dell'Accademia di San Luca, specialized in art and architecture history.

=== Museums ===
The municipio hosts 103 museums (70 municipal museums and 33 State museums), including landmark institutions such as the Vittoriano, the Capitoline Museums, the Scuderie del Quirinale, the Palazzo delle Esposizioni, and the Museum of the Central Institute for the Pathology of Archives and Books (ICPAL), founded by Alfonso Gallo.

=== Cinemas ===
- Teatro Adriano (Piazza Cavour)
- Cinema Augustus (Corso Vittorio Emanuele II)
- Cinema Barberini (Piazza Barberini)
- Cinema Doria (Via Andrea Doria)
- Cinema Farnese (Piazza Campo de' Fiori)
- Cinema Fiamma (Via Bissolati)
- Cinema Filmstudio (Via degli orti D'Alibert)
- Cinema Giulio Cesare (Viale Giulio Cesare)

- Cinema Greenwich (Via Giovanni Battista Bodoni)
- Cinema Intrastevere(Vicolo Moroni)
- Cinema Nuovo Olimpia (Via in Lucina)
- Cinema Nuovo Sacher (Largo Ascianghi)
- Cinema Quattro Fontane (Via delle Quattro Fontane)
- Cinema Reale (Piazza Sidney Sonnino)
- Cinema Rivoli (Via Lombardia)
- Cinema Royal (Via Emanuele Filiberto)
- Warner Village Cinema Moderno (Piazza della Repubblica)

=== Theatres ===
- Teatro Ambra Jovinelli (Via Guglielmo Pepe)
- Teatro Anfitrione (Via di S. Saba)
- Teatro Argentina (Largo di Torre Argentina)
- Teatro Belli (Piazza di Sant'Apollonia)
- Teatro Brancaccio (Via Merulana)
- Teatro Centrale Roma (Via Celsa)
- Teatro Eliseo (Via Nazionale)
- Teatro Petrolini (Via Rubattino)

- Teatro Piccolo Jovinelli (Via Giovanni Giolitti)
- Teatro Quirino (Via delle Vergini)
- Teatro Rossini (Piazza S.Chiara)
- Teatro Sala Umberto (Via della Mercede)
- Teatro Sistina (Via Sistina)
- Teatro Valle (Via del Teatro Valle)
- Teatro Vittoria (Piazza di Santa Maria Liberatrice)

== Transport ==
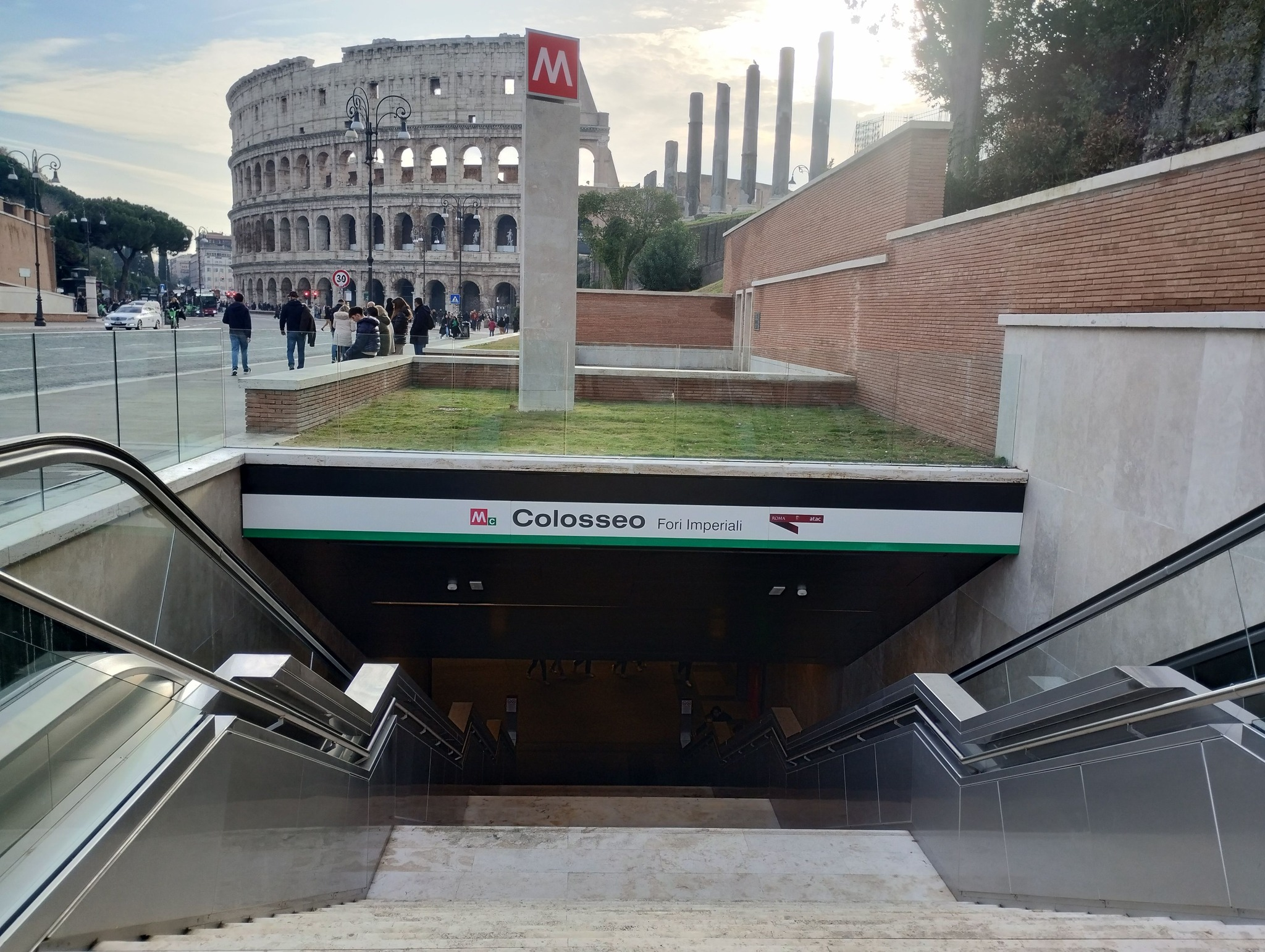
Line C Colosseo entrance.

Stations of Rome Metro in the Municipio I are:

- Cipro, Ottaviano, Lepanto, Flaminio, Spagna, Barberini, Repubblica, Termini, Vittorio Emanuele, Manzoni, San Giovanni;
- Castro Pretorio, Termini, Cavour, Colosseo, Circo Massimo, Piramide;
- Colosseo, San Giovanni.

Public transport is also ensured by numerous access points to the rail networks, as well as many buses, trolleybuses, and trams (including line 8 towards Gianicolense and lines 5 and 14 towards Via Prenestina).

The municipio hosts, or directly borders, Roma Termini railway station, the main railway hub in the city. Termini handles regional, national, and international connections, including the Rome–Naples high-speed railway. The district is also served by Roma Ostiense railway station, the central sections of Line A and Line B of the Rome Metro (which interchange at Termini), and the termini of two regional railways: the Rome–Lido and the Rome North lines. The former Rome–Giardinetti narrow-gauge railway also operated here until its definitive closure in view of its conversion into a modern tramway (Line G). Additionally, Roma Trastevere and Roma San Pietro railway stations are located just outside the borders and are easily accessible.

Roma Termini provides a direct rail link to Fiumicino Airport via the Leonardo Express non-stop service, as well as numerous dedicated airport bus lines serving both Fiumicino and Ciampino airports.

== Public parks and gardens ==
Despite its high urban density, Municipio I features some of Rome's most famous historic villas, public parks, and botanical gardens, offering significant green spaces within the ancient city center:

=== Historic Villas and Estate Gardens ===
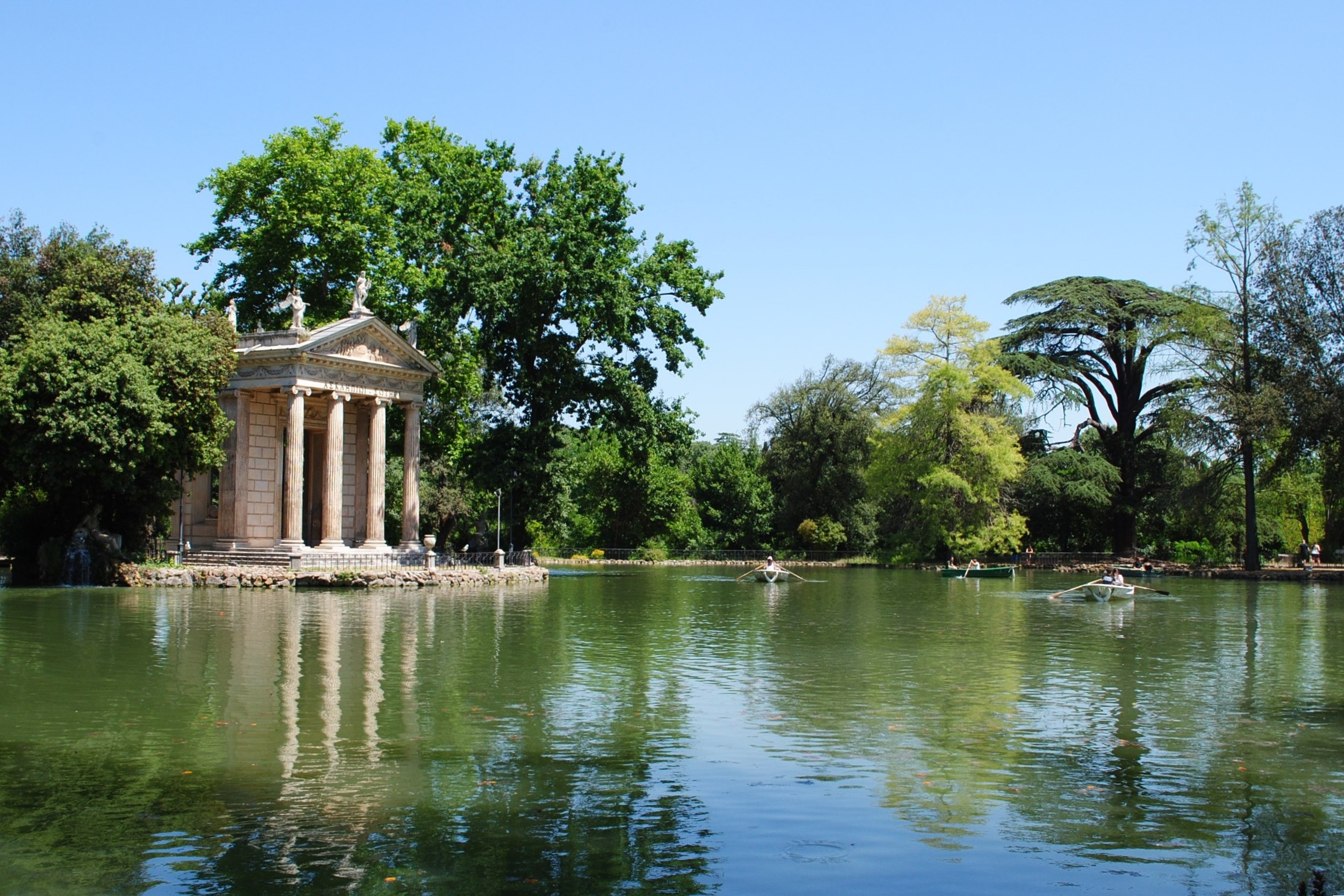
Villa Borghese public garden.

- Villa Borghese – A massive landscape garden containing a lake, temples, and fountains, originally developed by Cardinal Scipione Borghese in the 17th century. While parts of the park extend into Municipio II, its historic southern gates and monumental entrances border the historic center at Piazza del Popolo and Porta Pinciana.
- Villa Celimontana – Located atop the Caelian Hill, this historic villa park is famous for its lush gardens, ancient fountains, and an authentic Egyptian obelisk. It serves as a quiet neighborhood retreat next to the Colosseum.
- Parco del Colle Oppio – A public park situated on the Oppian Hill, offering direct views of the Colosseum. The park grounds directly overlay the ruins of Nero's Domus Aurea and the ancient Baths of Trajan.

=== Special Interest and Panoramic Gardens ===
- Giardino degli Aranci (Savello Park) – Located on the Aventine Hill, this walled public park is famous for its dense grove of bitter orange trees and a scenic terrace providing one of the most celebrated panoramic views of Rome and St. Peter's Basilica.
- Roseto Comunale – Rome's public rose garden, located on the slopes of the Aventine Hill overlooking the Circus Maximus. It hosts a vast collection of thousands of rose varieties from all over the world and opens to the public during the spring blooming season.
- Orto Botanico di Roma – The official Botanical Garden of Rome, managed by the Sapienza University of Rome. Located on the slopes of the Janiculum hill in the Trastevere rione, it occupies the former gardens of Palazzo Corsini and features historic greenhouses and a Japanese garden.
- Passeggiata del Gianicolo – A panoramic public promenade running along the crest of the Janiculum Hill. It is famous for its equestrian monument to Giuseppe Garibaldi, sweeping views of the Roman skyline, and the traditional daily noon cannon fire.

== Sports venues ==
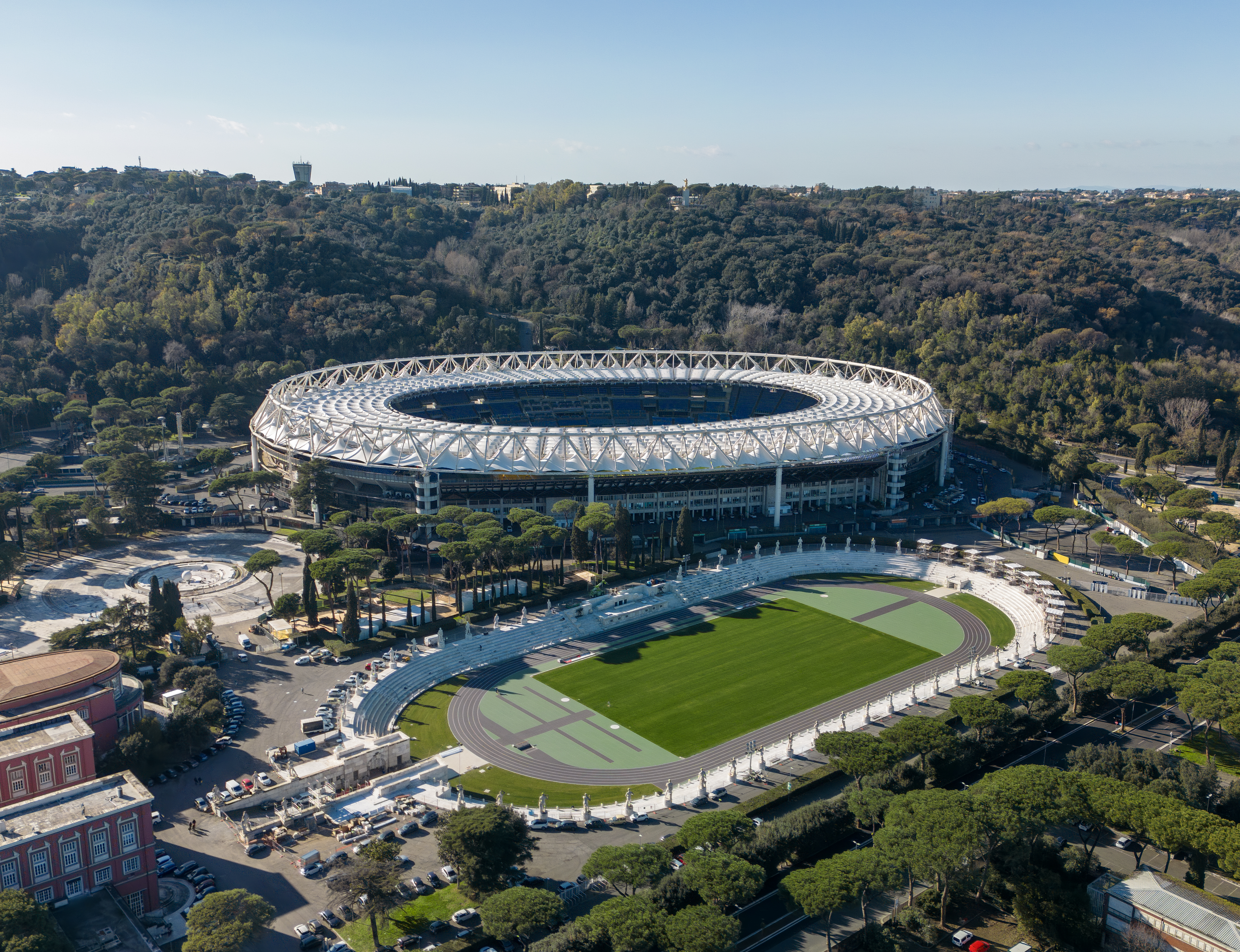
Stadio Olimpico and Stadio dei Marmi in Foro Italico sport complex.

Following the 2013 boundary expansion that incorporated the northern quarter of Della Vittoria, Municipio I hosts Rome's premier international sports district alongside several historic community complexes:

=== Foro Italico Complex ===
The Foro Italico is a world-class sports complex originally built between 1928 and 1938. It represents a major architectural landmark of Italian Rationalism and serves as the hub for elite athletic events:

- Stadio Olimpico – Rome's largest sports facility with a seating capacity of 70,634. It is the official home stadium for Serie A football clubs A.S. Roma and S.S. Lazio, and serves as the primary national venue for international rugby (such as the Six Nations Championship), athletics meets, and major music concerts.
- Stadio dei Marmi ("Pietro Mennea") – An athletics stadium famed for being encircled by 60 monumental white Carrara marble statues representing different sports disciplines. It includes a professional running track that features free public access for local residents.
- Stadio Centrale del Tennis – The primary tennis arena of the complex, hosting the prestigious Italian Open (Internazionali BNL d'Italia) as part of the ATP Tour Masters 1000 and WTA 1000 circuits.
- Stadio Nicola Pietrangeli – A historic tennis stadium lined with marble statues, widely considered one of the most scenic tennis courts in the world.
- Complesso Natatorio del Foro Italico – A historic swimming complex featuring indoor and outdoor Olympic-sized pools adorned with prominent mosaics. It hosted the swimming events for the 1960 Summer Olympics and multiple World Aquatics Championships.

=== Local and Municipal Sports Centers ===
- Stadio Nando Martellini – Located in Largo delle Vittime del Terrorismo inside the archaeological park of the Baths of Caracalla, it is a historic public athletics track heavily used by local running clubs.
- Roma Uno Centro Sportivo – Located in the Trastevere rione (Largo Ascianghi), it is a historic indoor sports center designed by prominent architect Luigi Moretti, hosting a public swimming pool and gymnastics facilities.
- Centro Sportivo Santa Maria – Located in Via Matteo Boiardo near San Giovanni in Laterano, a large multi-sport complex offering swimming pools, tennis courts, and football pitches serving the eastern core of the municipio.
