= Palazzo Corsini =

Palazzo Corsini may refer to:

- Palazzo Corsini, Florence
- Palazzo Corsini, Rome
